= 2018 Copa LP Chile Hacienda Chicureo =

- Date: 5–11 November
- Edition: 2nd
- Category: ITF Women's Circuit
- Prize money: $60,000
- Surface: Clay
- Location: Colina, Chile

Champions

Singles
- (China) Xu Shilin

Doubles
- (United States) Quinn Gleason / (Brazil) Luisa Stefani
← 2017 ·	Copa LP Chile Hacienda Chicureo	· 2019 →

The 2018 Copa LP Chile Hacienda Chicureo was a professional tennis tournament played on outdoor clay courts. It was the second edition of the tournament and was part of the 2018 ITF Women's Circuit. It took place in Colina, Chile, on 5–11 November 2018.

== Singles main draw entrants ==
=== Seeds ===
Country	Player	Rank^{1}	Seed
GER	Katharina Hobgarski	258	1
ARG	Paula Ormaechea	263	2
CHN	Xu Shilin	277	3
CHI	Daniela Seguel	291	4
CHI	Fernanda Brito	300	5
ARG	Victoria Bosio	317	6
COL	María Fernanda Herazo	342	7
BRA	Carolina Alves	362	8

- ^{1} Rankings as of 29 October 2018.

=== Other entrants ===
The following players received a wildcard into the singles main draw:

- (Chile) Bianca Lía Antican González
- (Chile) Fernanda Labraña
- (Chile) Daniela López
- (Chile) Ivania Martinich

The following players received entry from the qualifying draw:

- (South Africa) Zoë Kruger
- (Argentina) Carla Lucero
- (Hungary) Vanda Lukács
- (Brazil) Luisa Stefani

== Champions ==
=== Singles ===
- (China) Xu Shilin def. (Argentina) Paula Ormaechea, 7–5, 6–3

=== Doubles ===
- (United States) Quinn Gleason / (Brazil) Luisa Stefani def. (Chile) Bárbara Gatica / (Brazil) Rebeca Pereira, 6–0, 4–6, [10–7]
