= 2018 Copa LP Chile Hacienda Chicureo – Singles =

Women's tennis tournament

Singles
- 2018 Copa LP Chile Hacienda Chicureo

Final
- Champion: (China) Xu Shilin
- Runner-up: (Argentina) Paula Ormaechea
- Score: 7–5, 6–3

Events
Singles	Doubles
← 2017 ·	Copa LP Chile Hacienda Chicureo	· 2019 →

Chiara Scholl was the defending champion of the 2018 edition of the tennis tournament, but chose not to participate.

Xu Shilin won the title, defeating Paula Ormaechea in the final, 7–5, 6–3.

== Seeds ==
1. (Germany) Katharina Hobgarski (quarterfinals, retired)
2. (Argentina) Paula Ormaechea (final)
3. (China) Xu Shilin (champion)
4. (Chile) Daniela Seguel (second round)
5. (Chile) Fernanda Brito (quarterfinals)
6. (Argentina) Victoria Bosio (second round)
7. (Colombia) María Fernanda Herazo (first round)
8. (Brazil) Carolina Alves (first round)

== Draw ==
=== Key ===
- Q = Qualifier
- WC = Wild card
- LL = Lucky loser
- Alt = Alternate
- SE = Special exempt
- PR = Protected ranking
- ITF = ITF entry
- JE = Junior exempt
- w/o = Walkover
- r = Retired
- d = Defaulted
- SR = Special ranking

=== Finals ===
Semifinals
(Chile) Bárbara Gatica	5	6	1
3	(China) Xu Shilin	7	2	6
Q	(Brazil) Luisa Stefani	4	3
2	(Argentina) Paula Ormaechea	6	6

Final
3	(China) Xu Shilin	7	6
2	(Argentina) Paula Ormaechea	5	3

=== Top half ===
First round
1	(Germany) K Hobgarski	6	6
(Ukraine) M Zakarlyuk	1	0
WC	(Chile) I Martinich	5	6	2
WC	(Chile) F Labraña	7	3	6
(Romania) I Fetecău	7^{8}	2	6^{2}
(Chile) B Gatica	6^{6}	6	7^{7}
(Italy) V Meliss	6	4	0
6	(Argentina) V Bosio	4	6	6
3	(China) S Xu	6	6
(Brazil) G Cé	2	3
(Brazil) N Kurata	6^{5}	6^{4}
(Greece) D Papamichail	7^{7}	7^{7}
(Paraguay) C Giangreco Campiz	6	6
WC	(Chile) BL Antican González	1	0
Q	(Argentina) C Lucero	5	2
5	(Chile) F Brito	7	6

Second round
1	(Germany) K Hobgarski	6	6
WC	(Chile) F Labraña	2	4
(Chile) B Gatica	6	6
6	(Argentina) V Bosio	2	1
3	(China) S Xu	6	6
(Greece) D Papamichail	3	2
(Paraguay) C Giangreco Campiz	6^{5}	0
5	(Chile) F Brito	7^{7}	6

Quarterfinals
1	(Germany) K Hobgarski	0^{r}
(Chile) B Gatica	1
3	(China) S Xu	7^{8}	6
5	(Chile) F Brito	6^{6}	4

Semifinals
(Chile) B Gatica	5	6	1
3	(China) S Xu	7	2	6

=== Bottom half ===
First round
7	(Colombia) MF Herazo	5	1
Q	(South Africa) Z Kruger	7	6
WC	(Chile) D López	4	4
Q	(Brazil) L Stefani	6	6
(Spain) I Burillo Escorihuela	5	6	4
(Hungary) P Udvardy	7	4	6
(Mexico) AS Sánchez	3	4
4	(Chile) D Seguel	6	6
8	(Brazil) C Alves	2	1
(United Kingdom) F Jones	6	6
(Brazil) E Piai	4	1
(Chile) A Guarachi	6	6
(Russia) N Kukharchuk	1	4
(United States) Q Gleason	6	6
Q	(Hungary) V Lukács	2	1
2	(Argentina) P Ormaechea	6	6

Second round
Q	(South Africa) Z Kruger	4	4
Q	(Brazil) L Stefani	6	6
(Hungary) P Udvardy	6	6
4	(Chile) D Seguel	2	4
(United Kingdom) F Jones	4	7	2
(Chile) A Guarachi	6	5	6
(United States) Q Gleason	6	0	3
2	(Argentina) P Ormaechea	1	6	6

Quarterfinals
Q	(Brazil) L Stefani	6	6
(Hungary) P Udvardy	3	4
(Chile) A Guarachi	4	1
2	(Argentina) P Ormaechea	6	6

Semifinals
Q	(Brazil) L Stefani	4	3
2	(Argentina) P Ormaechea	6	6
