= 2019 Copa LP Chile Hacienda Chicureo – Doubles =

Doubles
- 2019 Copa LP Chile Hacienda Chicureo

Final
- Champions: (United States) Hayley Carter (Brazil) Luisa Stefani
- Runners-up: (Kazakhstan) Anna Danilina (Switzerland) Conny Perrin
- Score: 5–7, 6–3, [10–6]

Events
Singles	Doubles
← 2018 ·	Copa LP Chile Hacienda Chicureo	· 2021 →

Quinn Gleason and Luisa Stefani were the defending champions, but Gleason chose to participate at the 2019 Henderson Tennis Open instead.

Stefani partnered alongside Hayley Carter and successfully defended her title, defeating Anna Danilina and Conny Perrin in the final, 5–7, 6–3, [10–6].

== Seeds ==
1. (United States) Hayley Carter / (Brazil) Luisa Stefani (champions)
2. (Venezuela) Andrea Gámiz / (Spain) Georgina García Pérez (first round)
3. (Kazakhstan) Anna Danilina / (Switzerland) Conny Perrin (final)
4. (Chile) Bárbara Gatica / (Brazil) Rebeca Pereira (quarterfinals)

== Draw ==
=== Key ===
- Q = Qualifier
- WC = Wild card
- LL = Lucky loser
- Alt = Alternate
- SE = Special exempt
- PR = Protected ranking
- ITF = ITF entry
- JE = Junior exempt
- w/o = Walkover
- r = Retired
- d = Defaulted
- SR = Special ranking

=== Draw ===
First round
1	(United States) H Carter (Brazil) L Stefani	6	6
WC	(Argentina) J Ortenzi (Chile) VA Vásquez Pongruber	0	2
WC	(Argentina) V Bosio (Argentina) JL Estable	6^{4}	6^{6}
(Brazil) C Alves (Egypt) M Sherif	7^{7}	7^{8}
4	(Chile) B Gatica (Brazil) R Pereira	6	6
(Colombia) M Herazo González (Brazil) TG Pedretti	2	2
WC	(Chile) I Martinich (Switzerland) P Wuarin	2	0
(Greece) D Papamichail (Argentina) N Podoroska	6	6
(Spain) I Burillo Escorhuela (Mexico) R Zarazúa	6	6
(Italy) E Cocciaretto (Italy) S Errani	3	3
(Greece) V Grammatikopoulou (Mexico) AS Sánchez	2	3
3	(Kazakhstan) A Danilina (Switzerland) C Perrin	6	6
(Brazil) N Kurata (Brazil) E Piai	6	3	[6]
(Chile) F Brito (Chile) F Labraña	4	6	[10]
(Germany) K Gerlach (Norway) M Stokke	2	7	[12]
2	(Venezuela) A Gámiz (Spain) G García Pérez	6	5	[10]

Quarterfinals
1	(United States) H Carter (Brazil) L Stefani	6	6
(Brazil) C Alves (Egypt) M Sherif	3	4
4	(Chile) B Gatica (Brazil) R Pereira	3	4
(Greece) D Papamichail (Argentina) N Podoroska	6	6
(Spain) I Burillo Escorhuela (Mexico) R Zarazúa	7	3	[5]
3	(Kazakhstan) A Danilina (Switzerland) C Perrin	5	6	[10]
(Chile) F Brito (Chile) F Labraña	4	6	[7]
(Germany) K Gerlach (Norway) M Stokke	6	1	[10]

Semifinals
1	(United States) H Carter (Brazil) L Stefani	6	6
(Greece) D Papamichail (Argentina) N Podoroska	2	3
3	(Kazakhstan) A Danilina (Switzerland) C Perrin	6	7
(Germany) K Gerlach (Norway) M Stokke	1	5

Final
1	(United States) H Carter (Brazil) L Stefani	5	6	[10]
3	(Kazakhstan) A Danilina (Switzerland) C Perrin	7	3	[6]
