= 2018 Copa LP Chile Hacienda Chicureo – Doubles =

Doubles
- 2018 Copa LP Chile Hacienda Chicureo

Final
- Champions: (United States) Quinn Gleason (Brazil) Luisa Stefani
- Runners-up: (Chile) Bárbara Gatica (Brazil) Rebeca Pereira
- Score: 6–0, 4–6, [10–7]

Events
Singles	Doubles
← 2017 ·	Copa LP Chile Hacienda Chicureo	· 2019 →

Tamaryn Hendler and Anastasia Pivovarova were the defending champions, but neither player chose to participate.

Quinn Gleason and Luisa Stefani won the tournament, defeating Bárbara Gatica and Rebeca Pereira 6–0, 4–6, [10–7] in the final.

== Seeds ==
1. (United States) Quinn Gleason / (Brazil) Luisa Stefani (champions)
2. (Greece) Despina Papamichail / (Netherlands) Rosalie van der Hoek (quarterfinals)
3. (Brazil) Carolina Alves / (Mexico) Ana Sofía Sánchez (semifinals)
4. (Romania) Irina Fetecău / (Hungary) Panna Udvardy (semifinals)

== Draw ==
=== Key ===
- Q = Qualifier
- WC = Wild card
- LL = Lucky loser
- Alt = Alternate
- SE = Special exempt
- PR = Protected ranking
- ITF = ITF entry
- JE = Junior exempt
- w/o = Walkover
- r = Retired
- d = Defaulted
- SR = Special ranking

=== Draw ===
First round
1	(United States) Q Gleason (Brazil) L Stefani	6^{5}	7	[10]
(Netherlands) M Hoedt (Netherlands) N Liauw a Fong	7^{7}	5	[6]
(Brazil) G Cé (Argentina) P Ormaechea	5	7^{7}	[10]
(Chile) A Guarachi (Chile) D Seguel	7	6^{2}	[5]
3	(Brazil) C Alves (Mexico) AS Sánchez	6	6
WC	(Argentina) C Lucero (Chile) D López	3	3
(Argentina) V Bosio (Argentina) JL Estable	7	2	[10]
(Brazil) N Kurata (Brazil) E Piai	5	6	[4]
(Russia) N Kukharchuk (Mexico) AR Villarreal	6	4	[10]
WC	(Argentina) M Ferrero (Chile) I Martinich	3	6	[3]
(Spain) I Burillo Escorihuela (Colombia) MF Herazo	2	3
4	(Romania) I Fetecău (Hungary) P Udvardy	6	6
WC	(Chile) F Labraña (Chile) FE Vergara Jofre	6	3	[5]
(Chile) B Gatica (Brazil) R Pereira	1	6	[10]
(Chile) F Brito (Paraguay) C Giangreco Campiz	6	3	[7]
2	(Greece) D Papamichail (Netherlands) R van der Hoek	2	6	[10]

Quarterfinals
1	(United States) Q Gleason (Brazil) L Stefani	6	6
(Brazil) G Cé (Argentina) P Ormaechea	1	2
3	(Brazil) C Alves (Mexico) AS Sánchez	4	6	[10]
(Argentina) V Bosio (Argentina) JL Estable	6	1	[8]
(Russia) N Kukharchuk (Mexico) AR Villarreal	7^{7}	3	[8]
4	(Romania) I Fetecău (Hungary) P Udvardy	6^{5}	6	[10]
(Chile) B Gatica (Brazil) R Pereira	5	6	[11]
2	(Greece) D Papamichail (Netherlands) R van der Hoek	7	3	[9]

Semifinals
1	(United States) Q Gleason (Brazil) L Stefani	6	3	[10]
3	(Brazil) C Alves (Mexico) AS Sánchez	1	6	[2]
4	(Romania) I Fetecău (Hungary) P Udvardy	4	0
(Chile) B Gatica (Brazil) R Pereira	6	6

Final
1	(United States) Q Gleason (Brazil) L Stefani	6	4	[10]
(Chile) B Gatica (Brazil) R Pereira	0	6	[7]
