= 2019 Copa LP Chile Hacienda Chicureo =

- Date: 4–10 November 2019
- Edition: 3rd
- Category: ITF Women's World Tennis Tour
- Prize money: $60,000
- Surface: Clay
- Location: Colina, Chile

Champions

Singles
- (Italy) Elisabetta Cocciaretto

Doubles
- (United States) Hayley Carter / (Brazil) Luisa Stefani
← 2018 ·	Copa LP Chile Hacienda Chicureo	· 2021 →

The 2019 Copa LP Chile Hacienda Chicureo was a professional tennis tournament played on outdoor clay courts. It was the third edition of the tournament which was part of the 2019 ITF Women's World Tennis Tour. It took place in Colina, Chile between 4 and 10 November 2019.

== Singles main-draw entrants ==
=== Seeds ===
Country	Player	Rank^{1}	Seed
USA	Allie Kiick	151	1
COL	Camila Osorio	214	2
SUI	Conny Perrin	218	3
EGY	Mayar Sherif	223	4
ITA	Sara Errani	239	5
GRE	Valentini Grammatikopoulou	248	6
GER	Katharina Gerlach	251	7
ESP	Georgina García Pérez	257	8

- ^{1} Rankings are as of 21 October 2019.

=== Other entrants ===
The following players received wildcards into the singles main draw:

- (Chile) Fernanda Brito
- (Chile) Bárbara Gatica
- (Chile) Fernanda Labraña
- (Chile) Ivania Martinich

The following players received entry from the qualifying draw:

- (Colombia) Emiliana Arango
- (Argentina) Victoria Bosio
- (Argentina) María Lourdes Carlé
- (Venezuela) Andrea Gámiz
- (Brazil) Nathaly Kurata
- (Spain) Ana Lantigua de la Nuez
- (Brazil) Luisa Stefani
- (Norway) Melanie Stokke

== Champions ==
=== Singles ===
- (Italy) Elisabetta Cocciaretto def. (Argentina) Victoria Bosio, 6–3, 6–4

=== Doubles ===
- (United States) Hayley Carter / (Brazil) Luisa Stefani def. (Kazakhstan) Anna Danilina / (Switzerland) Conny Perrin, 5–7, 6–3, [10–6]
