= 2019 Copa LP Chile Hacienda Chicureo – Singles =

Singles
- 2019 Copa LP Chile Hacienda Chicureo

Final
- Champion: (Italy) Elisabetta Cocciaretto
- Runner-up: (Argentina) Victoria Bosio
- Score: 6–3, 6–4

Events
Singles	Doubles
← 2018 ·	Copa LP Chile Hacienda Chicureo	· 2021 →

Xu Shilin was the defending champion but chose to participate at the 2019 Shenzhen Longhua Open instead.

Elisabetta Cocciaretto won the title, defeating Victoria Bosio in the final, 6–3, 6–4.

== Seeds ==
1. (United States) Allie Kiick (semifinals)
2. (Colombia) Camila Osorio (quarterfinals)
3. (Switzerland) Conny Perrin (first round)
4. (Egypt) Mayar Sherif (semifinals)
5. (Italy) Sara Errani (second round)
6. (Greece) Valentini Grammatikopoulou (second round)
7. (Germany) Katharina Gerlach (quarterfinals)
8. (Spain) Georgina García Pérez (second round)

== Draw ==
=== Key ===
- Q = Qualifier
- WC = Wild card
- LL = Lucky loser
- Alt = Alternate
- SE = Special exempt
- PR = Protected ranking
- ITF = ITF entry
- JE = Junior exempt
- w/o = Walkover
- r = Retired
- d = Defaulted
- SR = Special ranking

=== Finals ===
Semifinals
1	(United States) Allie Kiick	7	2	2
(Italy) Elisabetta Cocciaretto	5	6	6
4	(Egypt) Mayar Sherif	2	5
Q	(Argentina) Victoria Bosio	6	7

Final
(Italy) Elisabetta Cocciaretto	6	6
Q	(Argentina) Victoria Bosio	3	4

=== Top half ===
First round
1	(United States) A Kiick	7	6
(Brazil) T Pereira	5	1
Q	(Brazil) N Kurata	0	3
WC	(Chile) B Gatica	6	6
(Brazil) C Alves	4	7	6
(Greece) D Papamichail	6	5	3
Q	(Brazil) L Stefani	1	2
7	(Germany) K Gerlach	6	6
3	(Switzerland) C Perrin	6^{3}	3
(Brazil) G Cé	7^{7}	6
Q	(Argentina) ML Carlé	3	3
(Chile) D Seguel	6	6
(Italy) E Cocciaretto	6	7
WC	(Chile) F Labraña	2	5
Q	(Venezuela) A Gámiz	5	6	5
6	(Greece) V Grammatikopoulou	7	2	7

Second round
1	(United States) A Kiick	6	6^{5}	6
WC	(Chile) B Gatica	1	7^{7}	2
(Brazil) C Alves	6^{2}	6	5
7	(Germany) K Gerlach	7^{7}	4	7
(Brazil) G Cé	6	2	6
(Chile) D Seguel	1	6	1
(Italy) E Cocciaretto	7	6
6	(Greece) V Grammatikopoulou	5	3

Quarterfinals
1	(United States) A Kiick	6	6
7	(Germany) K Gerlach	4	4
(Brazil) G Cé	3	1
(Italy) E Cocciaretto	6	6

Semifinals
1	(United States) A Kiick	7	2	2
(Italy) E Cocciaretto	5	6	6

=== Bottom half ===
First round
8	(Spain) G García Pérez	6^{3}	6	6
(Mexico) AS Sánchez	7^{7}	3	2
(Mexico) R Zarazúa	5	6	2
(Australia) S Mendez	7	0	6
Q	(Norway) M Stokke	1	3
(Kazakhstan) A Danilina	6	6
Q	(Spain) A Lantigua de la Nuez	2	0
4	(Egypt) M Sherif	6	6
5	(Italy) S Errani	6	7^{7}
WC	(Chile) F Brito	1	6^{4}
Q	(Argentina) V Bosio	6	3	6
(Spain) I Burillo Escorihuela	3	6	4
Q	(Colombia) E Arango	4	6	6
(Argentina) N Podoroska	6	3	3
WC	(Chile) I Martinich	5	1
2	(Colombia) C Osorio	7	6

Second round
8	(Spain) G García Pérez	3	2
(Australia) S Mendez	6	6
(Kazakhstan) A Danilina	7	2	2
4	(Egypt) M Sherif	5	6	6
5	(Italy) S Errani	2	1
Q	(Argentina) V Bosio	6	6
Q	(Colombia) E Arango	6	3^{r}
2	(Colombia) C Osorio	3	3

Quarterfinals
(Australia) S Mendez	2	6^{6}
4	(Egypt) M Sherif	6	7^{8}
Q	(Argentina) V Bosio	4	6	6
2	(Colombia) C Osorio	6	4	3

Semifinals
4	(Egypt) M Sherif	2	5
Q	(Argentina) V Bosio	6	7
