= Stephanie Petit =

Argentine tennis player

- Full name: Stephanie Mariel Petit
- Country (sports): Argentina
- Born: 25 August 1996 (age 29) Argentina
- Plays: Right (two-handed backhand)
- Prize money: $26,920

Singles
- Career record: 97–72
- Career titles: 0
- Highest ranking: No. 525 (12 February 2018)

Doubles
- Career record: 89–61
- Career titles: 4 ITF
- Highest ranking: No. 559 (26 February 2018)

Stephanie Mariel Petit (born 25 August 1996) is an Argentine former tennis player.

Petit has a career-high a singles ranking by the Women's Tennis Association (WTA) of 525, achieved on 12 February 2018. She also has a career-high WTA doubles ranking of 559, achieved on 26 February 2018. In her career, she won four ITF doubles titles.

Petit made her Fed Cup debut for Argentina in 2018. In Fed Cup, she has a win-loss record of 3–0 (doubles: 2–0).

== Career statistics ==
=== ITF finals ===
$25,000 tournaments
$15,000 tournaments
$10,000 tournaments

==== Singles (0–4) ====
Outcome	No.	Date	Tournament	Surface	Opponent	Score
Runner-up	1.	2 April 2017	ITF Campinas, Brazil	Clay	(Brazil) Paula Cristina Gonçalves	4–6, 4–6
Runner-up	2.	28 May 2017	ITF Benavídez, Argentina	Hard	(Argentina) Catalina Pella	4–6, 1–6
Runner-up	3.	17 September 2017	ITF Buenos Aires, Argentina	Clay	(Argentina) María Carlé	6–2, 2–6, 6–7^{(5)}
Runner-up	4.	8 October 2017	ITF Villa del Dique, Argentina	Clay	(Chile) Fernanda Brito	3–6, 2–6

==== Doubles (4–6) ====
Outcome	No.	Date	Tournament	Surface	Partner	Opponents	Score
Runner-up	1.	4 August 2013	ITF La Paz, Bolivia	Clay	(Paraguay) Sara Giménez	(Argentina) Guadalupe Moreno (Argentina) Francesca Rescaldani	2–6, 2–6
Winner	1.	13 September 2013	ITF Buenos Aires, Argentina	Clay	(Brazil) Flávia Guimarães Bueno	(Argentina) Vanesa Furlanetto (Argentina) Carolina Zeballos	6–2, 6–4
Runner-up	2.	8 December 2013	ITF São José dos Campos, Brazil	Clay	(Chile) Fernanda Brito	(Brazil) Eduarda Piai (Argentina) Nadia Podoroska	6–7, 5–7
Runner-up	3.	4 April 2014	ITF Lima, Peru	Clay	(Argentina) Carolina Zeballos	(Serbia) Tamara Čurović (Russia) Yana Sizikova	0–6, 4–6
Runner-up	4.	21 June 2015	ITF Manzanillo, Mexico	Hard	(Chile) Bárbara Gatica	(United States) Zoë Gwen Scandalis (Mexico) Renata Zarazúa	1–6, 2–6
Runner-up	5.	27 September 2015	ITF San Carlos, Argentina	Clay	(Chile) Bárbara Gatica	(Bolivia) María Fernanda Álvarez Terán (Argentina) Catalina Pella	2–6, 0–6
Winner	2.	17 April 2016	ITF Lins, Brazil	Clay	(Chile) Bárbara Gatica	(Argentina) Paula Ormaechea (Argentina) Constanza Vega	7–5, 6–3
Runner-up	6.	8 May 2016	ITF Villa María, Argentina	Clay	(Chile) Bárbara Gatica	(Brazil) Carolina Alves (Argentina) Constanza Vega	1–6, 6–7^{(4)}
Winner	3.	28 May 2017	ITF Benavídez, Argentina	Hard	(Chile) Bárbara Gatica	(Hungary) Naomi Totka (United States) Madison Bourguignon	6–2, 7–6^{(1)}
Winner	4.	17 December 2017	ITF Santa Cruz, Bolivia	Clay	(Argentina) Victoria Bosio	(Chile) Fernanda Brito (Paraguay) Camila Giangreco Campiz	7–5, 2–6, [10–8]
