= Thaísa Grana Pedretti =

Brazilian tennis player (born 1999)

- Country (sports): Brazil
- Born: 15 May 1999 (age 27) São Paulo, Brazil
- Plays: Right (two-handed backhand)
- Prize money: $117,908

Singles
- Career record: 246–138
- Career titles: 7 ITF
- Highest ranking: No. 379 (2 March 2020)
- Current ranking: No. 567 (22 July 2026)

Doubles
- Career record: 170–108
- Career titles: 16 ITF
- Highest ranking: No. 315 (10 February 2025)
- Current ranking: No. 356 (22 July 2026)
- Last updated on: 22 July 2026.

Thaísa Grana Pedretti (born 15 May 1999) is a Brazilian professional tennis player. She has career-high rankings of No. 379 in singles, achieved on 2 March 2020, and of No. 315 in doubles, achieved on 10 February 2025. Pedretti primarily competes on the ITF Women's World Tennis Tour.

In 2017, she competed in the junior events of the French Open, Wimbledon, and the US Open.

== Early life ==
Grana Pedretti was born in São Paulo. She started playing tennis at the age of 7 at the Mesq club in São Bernardo.

After that, Pedretti started playing in tournaments and went to the Helvetia Club. At age 12, she took a test for the Tennis Institute, passed, and started to train there.

== Career ==
=== Professional ===
Grana Pedretti competed at her first ITF tournament in June 2013.

=== 2021 ===
In December, she reached the final of the $15k tournament in Curitiba but could not finish the match due to a migraine attack in the first set.

=== 2023 ===
In December, she won the singles and doubles titles at a W15 tournament in Buenos Aires, Argentina. The following week, she stood in the final of a W15 event in Córdoba.

As of late 2023, Grana Pedretti started workng with Brazilian former tennis player Flávio Saretta as her coach.

=== 2024 ===
In February 2024, she reached the doubles final at the W50 tournament held in Mexico City. In November, partnering Diae El Jardi, Grana Pedretti won her first W50 tournament Austin, Texas, defeating Whitney Osuigwe and Alana Smith in the final.

=== 2025: WTA Tour debut ===
In September 2025, Grana Pedretti played at the qualifying rounds of the inaugural WTA 250 SP Open in São Paulo, Brazil. She reached the final round but lost to Yasmine Mansouri, therefore she missed her WTA Tour main-draw debut.

In October, she played at a W35 tournament at the club Paineiras do Morumby in São Paulo, Brazil. In doubles, she partnered with fellow Brazilian Luiza Fullana, reaching the semifinals but losing to Jazmín Ortenzi and María Paulina Pérez.

In November, Grana Pedretti competed at a W15 tournament in Mogi das Cruzes.

In the doubles draw, she played alongside Luiza Fullana and together they reached the final, where they faced Najah Dawson from Jamaica and Marjorie Souza from Brazil and won in straight sets. This was her 14th professional doubles title.

== Personal life ==
When not training or playing, Pedretti enjoys to watch tennis.

She is a fan and supporter of the Sociedade Esportiva Palmeiras soccer team from her hometown of São Paulo. Pedretti has cited Rafael Nadal and Simona Halep as being among her favorite tennis players.

== ITF Circuit finals ==
Legend
W25/35 tournaments
W10/15 tournaments

=== Singles: 18 (7 titles, 11 runner-ups) ===
Result	W–L	Date	Tournament	Tier	Surface	Opponent	Score
Loss	0–1	Oct 2017	ITF Buenos Aires, Argentina	W15	Clay	(Chile) Fernanda Brito	6–1, 5–7, 5–7
Win	1–1	Oct 2017	ITF Lambaré, Paraguay	W15	Clay	(Chile) Fernanda Brito	6–2, ret.
Win	2–1	Apr 2018	ITF Villa del Dique, Argentina	W15	Clay	(Chile) Fernanda Brito	6–0, 6–4
Loss	2–2	Jun 2018	ITF Tarvisio, Italy	W15	Clay	(Switzerland) Lisa Sabino	3–6, 3–6
Win	3–2	May 2019	ITF Cancún, Mexico	W15	Hard	(Romania) Patricia Maria Țig	6–4, 6–4
Loss	3–3	Jun 2019	ITF Cancún, Mexico	W15	Hard	(Canada) Layne Sleeth	2–6, 1–6
Loss	3–4	Jul 2019	ITF Cancún, Mexico	W15	Hard	(Brazil) Ingrid Martins	6–7^{(3)}, 6–7^{(4)}
Loss	3–5	Jul 2019	ITF Cancún, Mexico	W15	Hard	(United States) Adriana Reami	6–7^{(2)}, 6–7^{(5)}
Win	4–5	Jul 2019	ITF Cancún, Mexico	W15	Hard	(United States) Elle Christensen	6–2, 6–3
Win	5–5	Jul 2019	ITF Cancún, Mexico	W15	Hard	(Russia) Anna Morgina	6–4, 2–0 ret.
Loss	5–6	Sep 2019	ITF São Paulo, Brazil	W15	Clay	(Brazil) Carolina Alves	5–7, 1–6
Loss	5–7	Oct 2019	ITF Claremont, United States	W25	Hard	(United Kingdom) Katie Swan	1–6, 3–6
Win	6–7	Sep 2021	ITF Ibagué, Colombia	W15	Clay	(Colombia) Yuliana Lizarazo	4–6, 1–1 ret.
Loss	6–8	Nov 2021	ITF Curitiba, Brazil	W15	Clay	(Brazil) Gabriela Cé	0–3 ret.
Loss	6–9	Sep 2022	ITF Cancún, Mexico	W15	Hard	(United States) Kaitlin Quevedo	4–6, 3–6
Win	7–9	Nov 2023	ITF Buenos Aires, Argentina	W15	Clay	(United States) Alexia Harmon	7–5, 6–2
Loss	7–10	Nov 2023	ITF Córdoba, Argentina	W15	Clay	(Argentina) Luisina Giovannini	1–6, 1–6
Loss	7–11	Feb 2026	ITF Palm Coast, United States	W15	Clay	(United Kingdom) Sofia Johnson	4–6, 2–6

=== Doubles: 26 (16 titles, 10 runner-ups) ===
Legend
W50 tournaments
W25/35 tournaments
W10/15 tournaments

Result	W–L	Date	Tournament	Tier	Surface	Partner	Opponents	Score
Loss	0–1	Dec 2016	ITF La Paz, Bolivia	W10	Clay	(United States) Stephanie Nemtsova	(Argentina) Victoria Bosio (Mexico) Victoria Rodríguez	6–7^{(2)}, 4–6
Win	1–1	Mar 2017	ITF Campinas, Brazil	W15	Clay	(Brazil) Gabriela Cé	(Brazil) Nathaly Kurata (Brazil) Giovanna Tomita	6–1, 6–3
Win	2–1	Apr 2017	ITF São José dos Campos, Brazil	W15	Clay	(Brazil) Gabriela Cé	(Argentina) Victoria Bosio (Argentina) Julieta Lara Estable	5–7, 7–6^{(6)}, [10–3]
Win	3–1	Jul 2017	ITF Campos do Jordão, Brazil	W15	Hard	(Brazil) Gabriela Cé	(Brazil) Nathaly Kurata (Brazil) Eduarda Piai	7–5, 6–4
Loss	3–2	Oct 2017	ITF Lambaré, Paraguay	W15	Clay	(Bolivia) Noelia Zeballos	(Chile) Fernanda Brito (Paraguay) Camila Giangreco Campiz	w/o
Loss	3–3	Nov 2017	ITF Asunción, Paraguay	W15	Clay	(Brazil) Nathaly Kurata	(Chile) Fernanda Brito (Paraguay) Camila Giangreco Campiz	6–7^{(7)}, 4–6
Loss	3–4	Nov 2017	ITF Encarnación, Paraguay	W15	Clay	(Brazil) Nathaly Kurata	(Paraguay) Lara Escauriza (Chile) Bárbara Gatica	4–6, 4–6
Win	4–4	Dec 2017	ITF Luque, Paraguay	W15	Hard	(Bolivia) Noelia Zeballos	(Paraguay) Montserrat González (Mexico) Ana Sofía Sánchez	6–2, 6–4
Win	5–4	Mar 2018	ITF São José dos Campos, Brazil	W15	Clay	(Brazil) Carolina Alves	(Greece) Eleni Kordolaimi (Peru) Dominique Schaefer	6–4, 6–1
Loss	5–5	Mar 2019	ITF São Paulo, Brazil	W25	Clay	(Italy) Martina di Giuseppe	(Brazil) Paula Cristina Gonçalves (Brazil) Luisa Stefani	7–6^{(4)}, 0–6, [8–10]
Loss	5–6	May 2019	ITF Cancún, Mexico	W15	Hard	(Brazil) Eduarda Piai	(Mexico) María Portillo Ramírez (Mexico) Marcela Zacarías	3–6, 6–7^{(10)}
Win	6–6	May 2019	ITF Cancún, Mexico	W15	Hard	(Brazil) Eduarda Piai	(Guatemala) Kirsten-Andrea Weedon (United States) Amy Zhu	7–5, 7–5
Win	7–6	Jul 2019	ITF Cancún, Mexico	W15	Hard	(Mexico) María Portillo Ramírez	(Netherlands) Dewi Dijkman (Netherlands) Isabelle Haverlag	7–5, 6–3
Win	8–6	Jul 2019	ITF Cancún, Mexico	W15	Hard	(Mexico) María Portillo Ramírez	(Japan) Haine Ogata (Japan) Aiko Yoshitomi	6–4, 6–4
Loss	8–7	Sep 2019	ITF São Paulo, Brazil	W15	Clay	(Argentina) Eugenia Ganga	(Chile) Bárbara Gatica (Brazil) Rebeca Pereira	2–6, 4–6
Win	9–7	Feb 2020	ITF Cancún, Mexico	W15	Hard	(Brazil) Ingrid Martins	(Bulgaria) Eleonore Tchakarova (Bulgaria) Verginie Tchakarova	6–2, 6–2
Win	10–7	Feb 2020	ITF Cancún, Mexico	W15	Clay	(Argentina) María Lourdes Carlé	(United States) Kendra Bunch (Serbia) Katarina Kozarov	w/o
Win	11–7	Aug 2022	ITF Rio de Janeiro, Brazil	W25	Clay	(Bolivia) Noelia Zeballos	(India) Riya Bhatia (Colombia) María Paulina Pérez	6–3, 6–1
Win	12–7	Nov 2023	ITF Buenos Aires, Argentina	W15	Clay	(Ecuador) Camila Romero	(Argentina) Justina Maria González (Liechtenstein) Sylvie Zünd	0–6, 7–5, [10–5]
Loss	12–8	Feb 2024	ITF Mexico City, Mexico	W50	Hard	(Mexico) María Portillo Ramírez	(United States) Jessie Aney (United States) Jessica Failla	6–3, 4–6, [8–10]
Loss	12–9	Feb 2024	ITF Spring, United States	W35	Hard	(United States) Malkia Ngounoue	(United States) Whitney Osuigwe (United States) Alana Smith	4–6, 4–6
Win	13–9	Nov 2024	ITF Austin, United States	W50	Hard	(Morocco) Diae El Jardi	(United States) Whitney Osuigwe (United States) Alana Smith	6–2, 4–6, [14–12]
Win	14–9	Nov 2025	ITF Mogi das Cruzes, Brazil	W15	Clay	(Brazil) Luiza Fullana	(Jamaica) Najah Dawson (Brazil) Marjorie Souza	6–2, 6–0
Loss	14–10	Feb 2026	ITF Orlando, United States	W50	Hard	(Bolivia) Noelia Zeballos	(Bulgaria) Lia Karatancheva (Ukraine) Anita Sahdiieva	3–6, 4–6
Win	15–10	Feb 2026	ITF Palm Coast, United States	W15	Clay	(Brazil) Carolina Bohrer Martins	(United States) Kolie Allen (Mexico) Sebastiani León	7–6^{(4)}, 6–7^{(5)}, [10–4]
Win	16–10	Apr 2026	ITF Charlotte, United States	W35	Clay	(Brazil) Luiza Fullana	(Netherlands) Eva Vedder (Venezuela) Sofia Cabezas Dominguez	6–4, 6–2
