= Lisa Ponomar =

German tennis player (born 1997

- Country (sports): Germany
- Residence: Ahrensburg, Germany
- Born: 21 May 1997 (age 28); Hamburg, Germany
- Height: 1.80 m (5 ft 11 in)
- Plays: Right-handed (two-handed backhand)
- Prize money: $49,769

Singles
- Career record: 175–147
- Career titles: 2 ITF
- Highest ranking: No. 630 (21 May 2018)

Doubles
- Career record: 105–81
- Career titles: 6 ITF
- Highest ranking: No. 328 (23 October 2017)

Lisa Ponomar (born 21 May 1997) is a German former tennis player.

She has a career-high singles ranking of No. 630, achieved on 21 May 2018. On 23 October 2017, she peaked at No. 328 in the doubles rankings.

Ponomar made her WTA Tour main-draw debut at the 2018 Dubai Tennis Championships in the doubles draw, partnering Eden Silva.

== ITF finals ==
=== Singles: 4 (2 titles, 2 runner–ups) ===
Legend
$25,000 tournaments
$15,000 tournaments
$10,000 tournaments

|

Finals by surface
Hard (0–0)
Clay (1–2)
Carpet (1–0)

|}

Result	W–L	Date	Tournament	Tier	Surface	Opponent	Score
Loss	0–1	Mar 2014	ITF Antalya, Turkey	10,000	Clay	(Belarus) Iryna Shymanovich	2–6, 3–6
Win	1–1	Jul 2017	ITF De Haan, Belgium	15,000	Clay	(France) Alice Ramé	6–4, 6–3
Loss	1–2	Jul 2018	ITF Sandefjord, Norway	15,000	Clay	(Norway) Malene Helgø	3–6, 6–4, 3–6
Win	2–2	May 2019	ITF Cantanhede, Portugal	15,000	Carpet	(Czech Republic) Karolina Beranková	6–1, 4–6, 6–3

=== Doubles: 17 (6 titles, 11 runner-ups) ===
Legend
$25,000 tournaments
$15,000 tournaments
$10,000 tournaments

Result	No.	Date	Tournament	Surface	Partner	Opponents	Score
Loss	1.	18 January 2014	ITF Stuttgart, Germany	Hard (i)	(Switzerland) Karin Kennel	(Germany) Carolin Daniels (Germany) Laura Schaeder	6–4, 1–6, [7–10]
Loss	2.	8 November 2014	ITF Antalya, Turkey	Clay	(Russia) Shakhlo Saidova	(Romania) Irina Bara (Turkey) Melis Sezer	w/o
Loss	3.	29 September 2016	ITF Melilla, Spain	Clay	(Italy) Marianna Natali	(Croatia) Mariana Dražić (Hungary) Panna Udvardy	1–6, 0–2 ret.
Loss	4.	28 October 2016	ITF Pula, Italy	Clay	(Romania) Michele Alexandra Zmau	(Switzerland) Ylena In-Albon (Italy) Giorgia Marchetti	6–4, 2–6, [8–10]
Loss	5.	6 May 2017	ITF Pula, Italy	Clay	(Italy) Maria Masini	(Chile) Fernanda Brito (Bolivia) Noelia Zeballos	3–6, 6–0, [3–10]
Loss	6.	20 May 2017	ITF Hammamet, Tunisia	Clay	(Italy) Dalila Spiteri	(Serbia) Natalija Kostić (Bosnia and Herzegovina) Jelena Simić	4–6, 4–6
Win	1.	24 June 2017	ITF Kaltenkirchen, Germany	Clay	(Uzbekistan) Albina Khabibulina	(Australia) Gabriella Da Silva-Fick (Belgium) Magali Kempen	6–4, 6–0
Loss	7.	23 July 2017	ITF Aschaffenburg, Germany	Clay	(United States) Yuki Kristina Chiang	(Germany) Katharina Hobgarski (Germany) Julia Wachaczyk	3–6, 6–2, [3–10]
Win	2.	16 September 2017	ITF Pula, Italy	Clay	(Venezuela) Andrea Gámiz	(Switzerland) Aline Thommen (Venezuela) Aymet Uzcátegui	5–7, 6–2, [10–6]
Win	3.	11 November 2017	ITF Hammamet, Tunisia	Clay	(Serbia) Tamara Čurović	(Italy) Anastasia Grymalska (Italy) Giorgia Marchetti	6–4, 7–6^{(7)}
Loss	8.	10 February 2018	ITF Manacor, Spain	Clay	(Moldova) Alexandra Perper	(Japan) Yukina Saigo (Japan) Naho Sato	6–3, 5–7, [8–10]
Loss	9.	4 August 2018	ITF Dublin, Ireland	Carpet	(United Kingdom) Emily Appleton	(Romania) Karola Patricia Bejenaru (Germany) Julia Kimmelmann	3–6, 6–2, [7–10]
Win	4.	18 November 2018	ITF Antalya, Turkey	Clay	(Japan) Naho Sato	(Romania) Ioana Gașpar (Romania) Oana Georgeta Simion	6–4, 6–2
Win	5.	4 August 2019	ITF Dublin, Ireland	Carpet	(Romania) Karola Patricia Bejenaru	(Czech Republic) Karolina Beranková (Republic of Ireland) Georgia Drummy	6–0, 6–4
Loss	10.	9 February 2020	ITF Monastir, Tunisia	Hard	(Germany) Katharina Hering	(Russia) Anastasia Pribylova (Russia) Anastasia Tikhonova	7–5, 6–7^{(4)}, [4–10]
Loss	11.	17 October 2020	ITF Monastir, Tunisia	Hard	(Poland) Weronika Falkowska	(Chile) Bárbara Gatica (Brazil) Rebeca Pereira	6–3, 6–7^{(3)}, [15–17]
Win	6.	24 October 2020	ITF Monastir, Tunisia	Hard	(Poland) Weronika Falkowska	(Russia) Anna Ureke (Russia) Ekaterina Vishnevskaya	6–1, 6–0
