= Copa LP Chile =

- 2026 Copa LP Chile

WTA 125
- Event name: LP Open by IND (2022–present); Copa LP Chile presentada por IND (2021); Copa LP Chile Hacienda Chicureo (2017–19)
- Location: Colina, Chile
- Venue: Hacienda Chicureo
- Category: WTA 125
- Surface: Clay
- Draw: 32S/8Q/8D
- Prize money: $115,000
- Website: www.torneosfemchile.cl

Current champions (2026)
- Women's singles: (Switzerland) Rebeka Masarova
- Women's doubles: (Slovenia) Veronika Erjavec (Kazakhstan) Zhibek Kulambayeva

The Copa LP Chile is a tournament for professional female tennis players played on outdoor clay courts. The event is classified as a $115,000 WTA 125 tournament and is as per 2022 held at Hacienda Chicureo in Colina, Chile. Prior to 2022, the tournaments used to be a part of ITF Women's Circuit. The 2021 edition of the tournament, by exception, took place at the Club Palestino in Santiago. Earlier editions were also based in Colina.

== Past finals ==
=== Singles ===
Year	Champion	Runner-up	Score
2026	(Switzerland) Rebeka Masarova	(Spain) Leyre Romero Gormaz	6–4, 6–4
2025	(Ukraine) Oleksandra Oliynykova	(France) Léolia Jeanjean	7–5, 6–1
2024	(Serbia) Nina Stojanović	(Argentina) María Lourdes Carlé	3–6, 6–4, 6–4
2023	(Czech Republic) Sára Bejlek	(France) Diane Parry	6–2, 6–1
2022	(Egypt) Mayar Sherif	(Ukraine) Kateryna Baindl	3–6, 7–6^{(7–3)}, 7–5
⬆️ WTA 125 event ⬆️
2021	(Hungary) Anna Bondár	(Paraguay) Verónica Cepede Royg	6–2, 6–3
2020	Tournament cancelled due to the COVID-19 pandemic		
2019	(Italy) Elisabetta Cocciaretto	(Argentina) Victoria Bosio	6–3, 6–4
2018	(China) Xu Shilin	(Argentina) Paula Ormaechea	7–5, 6–3
2017	(United States) Chiara Scholl	(Mexico) Marcela Zacarías	6–3, 6–2
⬆️ ITF event ⬆️

=== Doubles ===
Year	Champions	Runners-up	Score
2026	(Slovenia) Veronika Erjavec (Kazakhstan) Zhibek Kulambayeva	(Ukraine) Valeriya Strakhova; Anastasia Tikhonova	6–4, 6–3
2025	(Argentina) María Lourdes Carlé (Spain) Sara Sorribes Tormo	(France) Léolia Jeanjean (Ukraine) Valeriya Strakhova	6–2, 6–4
2024	(Egypt) Mayar Sherif (Serbia) Nina Stojanović	(France) Kristina Mladenovic (France) Léolia Jeanjean	walkover
2023	(Germany) Julia Lohoff (Switzerland) Conny Perrin	(Peru) Lucciana Pérez Alarcón (Chile) Daniela Seguel	7–6^{(7–4)}, 6–2
2022	Yana Sizikova (Indonesia) Aldila Sutjiadi	(Egypt) Mayar Sherif (Slovenia) Tamara Zidanšek	6–1, 3–6, [10–7]
⬆️ WTA 125 event ⬆️
2021	(Netherlands) Arianne Hartono (Australia) Olivia Tjandramulia	(Germany) Katharina Gerlach (Chile) Daniela Seguel	6–1, 6–3
2020	Tournament cancelled due to the COVID-19 pandemic		
2019	(United States) Hayley Carter (Brazil) Luisa Stefani (2)	(Kazakhstan) Anna Danilina (Switzerland) Conny Perrin	5–7, 6–3, [10–6]
2018	(United States) Quinn Gleason (Brazil) Luisa Stefani	(Chile) Bárbara Gatica (Brazil) Rebeca Pereira	6–0, 4–6, [10–7]
2017	(Belgium) Tamaryn Hendler (Russia) Anastasia Pivovarova	(Brazil) Carolina Alves (Mexico) Ana Sofía Sánchez	7–5, 6–2
⬆️ ITF event ⬆️
