= Rebeca Pereira =

Brazilian tennis player

- Country (sports): Brazil
- Born: 23 March 1993 (age 33)
- Plays: Right (two-handed backhand)
- College: University of North Florida
- Prize money: US$ 81,850

Singles
- Career record: 115–193
- Career titles: 0
- Highest ranking: No. 868 (28 August 2023)
- Current ranking: No. 1,120 (1 December 2025)

Doubles
- Career record: 250–222
- Career titles: 16 ITF
- Highest ranking: No. 157 (18 July 2022)
- Current ranking: No. 418 (1 December 2025)
Medal record
Representing Brazil
Women's Tennis
South American Games
Silver medal – second place	2022 Asunción	Women's doubles
- Last updated on: 1 December 2025.

Rebeca Pereira (born 23 March 1993) is a Brazilian professional tennis player. She has a career-high WTA singles ranking of No. 868, achieved on 28 August 2023 and a best doubles ranking of No. 157, reached on 18 July 2022. She has won 16 ITF Women's Tour doubles titles in her career to date.

Pereira played for Brazilian team at the Billie Jean King Cup in 2022.

== ITF Circuit finals ==
=== Doubles: 43 (19 titles, 24 runner-ups) ===
Legend W60/75 tournaments W25/35 tournaments W15 tournaments	Finals by surface Hard (1–2) Clay (18–22)

Result	W–L	Date	Tournament	Tier	Surface	Partner	Opponents	Score
Loss	0–1	Jul 2017	ITF Campos do Jordao, Brazil	W15	Hard	(Brazil) Nathaly Kurata	(Brazil) Ingrid Martins (Paraguay) Camila Giangreco Campiz	3–6, 6–7^{(1)}
Win	1–1	Apr 2018	ITF Villa Dolores, Argentina	W15	Clay	(Chile) Bárbara Gatica	(Argentina) Victoria Bosio (Argentina) Julieta Lara Estable	6–2, 6–4
Loss	1–2	Aug 2018	ITF Guayaquil, Ecuador	W15	Clay	(Chile) Bárbara Gatica	(Chile) Fernanda Brito (Argentina) Sofía Luini	1–6, 0–6
Loss	1–3	Aug 2018	ITF Lambaré, Paraguay	W15	Clay	(Chile) Bárbara Gatica	(Chile) Fernanda Brito (Paraguay) Camila Giangreco Campiz	4–6, 6–4, [3–10]
Win	2–3	Sep 2018	ITF Hilton Head, United States	W15	Clay	(Chile) Bárbara Gatica	(United States) Allura Zamarripa (United States) Maribella Zamarripa	7–6^{(2)}, 3–6, [11–9]
Loss	2–4	Nov 2018	Copa Colina, Chile	W60	Clay	(Chile) Bárbara Gatica	(United States) Quinn Gleason (Brazil) Luisa Stefani	0–6, 6–4, [7–10]
Win	3–4	Nov 2018	ITF Villa del Dique, Argentina	W15	Clay	(Chile) Bárbara Gatica	(Chile) Fernanda Brito (Argentina) Carla Lucero	6–3, 6–3
Loss	3–5	Mar 2019	ITF Antalya, Turkey	W15	Clay	(Chile) Bárbara Gatica	(Japan) Rina Saigo (Japan) Yukina Saigo	6–4, 2–6, [5–10]
Loss	3–6	May 2019	ITF Tabarka, Tunisia	W15	Clay	(Chile) Bárbara Gatica	(Czech Republic) Kristyna Hrabalová (Poland) Joanna Zawadzka	6–7^{(4)}, 7–6^{(7)}, [9–11]
Win	4–6	May 2019	ITF Tabarka, Tunisia	W15	Clay	(Chile) Bárbara Gatica	(Netherlands) Eva Vedder (Netherlands) Stéphanie Visscher	6–3, 1–6, [10–5]
Loss	4–7	Jun 2019	ITF Tabarka, Tunisia	W15	Clay	(Chile) Bárbara Gatica	(South Africa) Natasha Fourouclas (Slovakia) Ingrid Vojčináková	6–3, 4–6, [8–10]
Win	5–7	Jun 2019	ITF Périgueux, France	W25	Clay	(Chile) Bárbara Gatica	(Colombia) María Herazo González (Latvia) Diāna Marcinkeviča	6–4, 6–2
Loss	5–8	Jul 2019	ITF Denain, France	W25	Clay	(Chile) Bárbara Gatica	(Russia) Daria Mishina (China) Xu Shilin	0–6, 5–7
Win	6–8	Sep 2019	ITF São Paulo, Brazil	W15	Clay	(Chile) Bárbara Gatica	(Argentina) Eugenia Ganga (Brazil) Thaísa Grana Pedretti	6–2, 6–4
Loss	6–9	Oct 2020	ITF Monastir, Tunisia	W15	Clay	(Chile) Bárbara Gatica	(Spain) Yvonne Cavallé Reimers (Belgium) Eliessa Vanlangendonck	4–6, 6–7^{(3)}
Win	7–9	Oct 2020	ITF Monastir, Tunisia	W15	Clay	(Chile) Bárbara Gatica	(Poland) Weronika Falkowska (Germany) Lisa Ponomar	3–6, 7–6^{(3)}, [17–15]
Loss	7–10	Nov 2020	ITF Las Palmas, Spain	W15	Clay	(Chile) Bárbara Gatica	(Venezuela) Andrea Gámiz (Argentina) Guillermina Naya	6–3, 5–7, [7–10]
Loss	7-11	Dec 2020	ITF Madrid, Spain	W15	Clay	(Chile) Bárbara Gatica	(Spain) Ángela Fita Boluda (Russia) Oksana Selekhmeteva	6–7^{(4)}, 6–1, [5–10]
Loss	7–12	Apr 2021	ITF Córdoba, Argentina	W25	Clay	(Chile) Bárbara Gatica	(Russia) Amina Anshba (Hungary) Panna Udvardy	3–6, 3–6
Loss	7–13	Jul 2021	ITF Tarvisio, Italy	W25	Clay	(Chile) Bárbara Gatica	(Sweden) Caijsa Hennemann (Slovenia) Nika Radišić	4–6, 1–6
Loss	7–14	Jul 2021	ITS Cup, Czech Republic	W60	Clay	(Chile) Bárbara Gatica	(United States) Jessie Aney (Czech Republic) Anna Sisková	1–6, 0–6
Win	8–14	Jul 2021	Kozerki Open, Poland	W60	Clay	(Chile) Bárbara Gatica	(South Korea) Jang Su-jeong (Chinese Taipei) Lee Ya-hsuan	6–3, 6–1
Loss	8–15	Oct 2021	ITF Rio do Sul, Brazil	W25	Clay	(Chile) Bárbara Gatica	(Germany) Katharina Gerlach (Chile) Daniela Seguel	6–7^{(8)}, 3–6
Loss	8–16	Jan 2022	ITF Florianópolis, Brazil	W25	Hard	(Chile) Bárbara Gatica	(Venezuela) Andrea Gámiz (United States) Sofia Sewing	4–6, 1–6
Win	9–16	Feb 2022	ITF Tucumán, Argentina	W25	Clay	(Chile) Bárbara Gatica	(Venezuela) Andrea Gámiz (Argentina) Paula Ormaechea	6–3, 7–5
Win	10–16	Mar 2022	ITF Salinas, Ecuador	W25	Hard	(Chile) Bárbara Gatica	(Colombia) María Herazo González (Colombia) María Paulina Pérez	6–4, 6–0
Win	11–16	May 2022	I.ČLTK Prague Open, Czech Republic	W60	Clay	(Chile) Bárbara Gatica	(Czech Republic) Jesika Malečková (Czech Republic) Miriam Kolodziejová	6–4, 6–2
Win	12–16	Jun 2022	ITF Périgueux, France	W25	Clay	(Chile) Daniela Seguel	(United Kingdom) Emily Appleton (Australia) Alexandra Osborne	6–4, 6–1
Loss	12–17	Apr 2023	ITF Guayaquil, Ecuador	W25	Clay	(Brazil) Ana Candiotto	(United States) Jessie Aney (United States) Sofia Sewing	1–6, 2–6
Win	13–17	May 2023	ITF Curitiba, Brazil	W15	Clay	(Brazil) Ana Candiotto	(United States) Sabastiani León (Argentina) Jazmín Ortenzi	7–5, 3–6, [10–3]
Finalist (Note: The match was not played due to poor weather.)	–NP-	Nov 2023	ITF Santo Domingo, Dominican Republic	W25	Hard	(Japan) Hiroko Kuwata	(Poland) Anna Hertel (Poland) Olivia Lincer	not played
Loss	13–18	Apr 2024	Florianópolis Challenger, Brazil	W75	Clay	(Serbia) Katarina Jokić	Maria Kozyreva; Maria Kononova	4–6, 3–6
Loss	13–19	May 2024	ITF Sopo, Colombia	W35	Clay	(Colombia) Yuliana Lizarazo	(Mexico) María Portillo Ramírez (Bolivia) Noelia Zeballos	4–6, 4–6
Win	14–19	Jun 2024	ITF Rio Claro, Brazil	W15	Clay	(Ecuador) Camila Romero	(Argentina) Jazmín Ortenzi (Peru) Lucciana Pérez Alarcón	6–3, 6–1
Loss	14–20	Sep 2024	ITF Leme, Brazil	W35	Clay	(Ecuador) Camila Romero	(Italy) Miriana Tona (Bolivia) Noelia Zeballos	6–4, 4–6, [4–10]
Win	15–20	Jun 2025	ITF Ystad, Sweden	W35	Clay	(Serbia) Katarina Jokić	(Sweden) June Björk (Denmark) Emma Kamper	1–6, 6–2, [10–7]
Loss	15–21	Jul 2025	ITF Darmstadt, Germany	W35	Clay	(Chile) Fernanda Labraña	(Switzerland) Chelsea Fontenel (France) Marie Mattel	3–6, 4–6
Loss	15–22	Jul 2025	ITF Horb, Germany	W35	Clay	(Argentina) Jazmín Ortenzi	(Germany) Tessa Brockmann (Germany) Josy Daems	7–5, 2–6, [2–10]
Loss	15–23	Oct 2025	ITF São João da Boa Vista, Brazil	W15	Clay	(Brazil) Júlia Konishi Camargo Silva	(Argentina) Jazmín Ortenzi (Colombia) María Paulina Pérez	3–6, 7–6^{(3)}, [7–10]
Win	16–23	Jan 2026	ITF Buenos Aires, Argentina	W35	Clay	(Chile) Fernanda Labraña	(Argentina) Carla Markus (Argentina) María Florencia Urrutia	6–3, 5–7, [10–7]
Loss	16–24	Jul 2026	ITF Rio Claro, Brazil	W15	Clay	(Brazil) Júlia Konishi Camargo Silva	(Brazil) Ana Candiotto (Brazil) Luiza Fullana	4–6, 6–7^{(5)}
Win	17–24	Jul 2026	ITF Pergamino, Argentina	W35	Clay	(Argentina) María Florencia Urrutia	(Argentina) Luciana Moyano (Ecuador) Camila Romero	4–6, 6–1, [10–8]
Win	18–24	Oct 2026	ITF Maceió, Brazil	W15	Clay (i)	(Chile) Bárbara Gatica	(Argentina) Lourdes Ayala (Ecuador) Camila Romero	6–4, 6–0
Win	19–24	Nov 2026	ITF São Carlos, Brazil	W15	Clay	(Chile) Bárbara Gatica	(Brazil) Sabrina Dias (Brazil) Letícia Garcia Vidal	6–2, 6–0
