= Carla Lucero (tennis) =

Argentine tennis player

- Country (sports): Argentina
- Born: 26 October 1990 (age 35)
- Plays: Right-handed (two-handed backhand)
- Prize money: $63,236

Singles
- Career record: 256–166
- Career titles: 1 ITF
- Highest ranking: No. 371 (7 June 2010)

Doubles
- Career record: 126–107
- Career titles: 7 ITF
- Highest ranking: No. 517 (7 November 2011)

Carla Lucero (born 26 October 1990) is an Argentine former tennis player.

Lucero has a career-high WTA singles ranking of 371, achieved on 7 June 2010. On 7 November 2011, she peaked at No. 517 in the WTA doubles rankings. In her career, she won one singles title and seven doubles titles at tournaments of the ITF Women's Circuit.

Lucero made her Fed Cup debut for Argentina in 2019. She lost her doubles match, which has been her single team participation.

== ITF Circuit finals ==
=== Singles: 13 (1 title, 12 runner–ups) ===
Legend
$15,000 tournaments
$10,000 tournaments

| Result | W–L | Date | Tournament | Tier | Surface | Opponent | Score |
|---|---|---|---|---|---|---|---|
| Loss | 0–1 | Jun 2009 | ITF Córdoba, Spain | 10,000 | Clay | (Argentina) María Irigoyen | 1–6, 0–6 |
| Win | 1–1 | Nov 2009 | ITF Lima, Peru | 10,000 | Clay | (Paraguay) Verónica Cepede Royg | 5–7, 6–3, 7–5 |
| Loss | 1–2 | Dec 2009 | ITF Santiago, Chile | 10,000 | Clay | (Brazil) Ana Clara Duarte | 2–6, 1–6 |
| Loss | 1–3 | Sep 2010 | ITF Buenos Aires, Argentina | 10,000 | Clay | (Argentina) Vanesa Furlanetto | 3–6, 2–6 |
| Loss | 1–4 | Sep 2010 | ITF Mogi das Cruzes, Brazil | 10,000 | Clay | (Brazil) Roxane Vaisemberg | 2–6, 3–6 |
| Loss | 1–5 | Nov 2010 | ITF Carillo, Argentina | 10,000 | Clay | (Argentina) Vanesa Furlanetto | 3–6, 3–6 |
| Loss | 1–6 | Sep 2011 | ITF São Paulo, Brazil | 10,000 | Clay | (Argentina) María Irigoyen | 2–6, 3–6 |
| Loss | 1–7 | Oct 2011 | ITF Goiania, Brazil | 10,000 | Clay | (Brazil) Maria Fernanda Alves | 2–6, 4–6 |
| Loss | 1–8 | Nov 2011 | ITF Concepción, Chile | 10,000 | Clay | (Chile) Fernanda Brito | 3–6, 4–6 |
| Loss | 1–9 | Mar 2014 | ITF Lima, Peru | 10,000 | Clay | (Argentina) Nadia Podoroska | 3–6, 4–6 |
| Loss | 1–10 | Jun 2014 | ITF Villa Maria, Argentina | 10,000 | Clay | (Argentina) Sofía Luini | 4–6, 1–6 |
| Loss | 1–11 | Nov 2018 | ITF Villa del Dique, Argentina | 15,000 | Clay | (Chile) Fernanda Brito | 3–6, 3–6 |
| Loss | 1–12 | Apr 2019 | ITF Bucaramanga, Colombia | 15,000 | Clay | (Chile) Fernanda Brito | 6–4, 3–6, 3–6 |

=== Doubles: 20 (7 titles, 13 runner–ups) ===
| Outcome | No. | Date | Tournament | Surface | Partner | Opponents | Score |
|---|---|---|---|---|---|---|---|
| Runner-up | 1. | 11 December 2009 | ITF Santiago, Chile | Clay | (Argentina) Julieta Soledad Rodriguez | (Brazil) Ana Clara Duarte (Argentina) Verónica Spiegel | 1–6, 4–6 |
| Runner-up | 2. | 28 August 2010 | ITF Buenos Aires, Argentina | Clay | (Argentina) Estefania Donnet | (Argentina) Mailen Auroux (Colombia) Karen Castiblanco | 5–7, 0–6 |
| Winner | 1. | 2 October 2010 | ITF Arujá, Brazil | Clay | (Argentina) Emilia Yorio | (Colombia) Karen Castiblanco (Argentina) Vanesa Furlanetto | 4–6, 6–4, [10–8] |
| Winner | 2. | 15 November 2010 | ITF Tandil, Argentina | Clay | (Argentina) Lucia Jara Lozano | (Argentina) Jordana Lujan (Argentina) Catalina Pella | 4–6, 6–4, 6–4 |
| Runner-up | 3. | 15 August 2011 | ITF La Paz, Bolivia | Clay | (Argentina) Luciana Sarmenti | (Argentina) María Irigoyen (Chile) Andrea Koch Benvenuto | 2–6, 2–6 |
| Winner | 3. | 22 August 2011 | ITF Cochabamba, Bolivia | Clay | (Argentina) María Irigoyen | (Slovakia) Lenka Broosova (Romania) Daiana Negreanu | 6–2, 6–3 |
| Runner-up | 4. | 12 September 2011 | ITF São José dos Campos, Brazil | Clay | (Argentina) María Irigoyen | (Brazil) Flávia Dechandt Araújo (Brazil) Laura Pigossi | 6–3, 5–7, 2–6 |
| Winner | 4. | 19 September 2011 | ITF São Paulo, Brazil | Clay | (Argentina) María Irigoyen | (Brazil) Gabriela Cé (Brazil) Flávia Guimarães Bueno | 7–6^{(12)}, 6–4 |
| Winner | 5. | 17 October 2011 | ITF Goiânia, Brazil | Clay | (Paraguay) Jazmin Britos | (Brazil) Gabriela Cé (Brazil) Maria Fernanda Alves | 0–6, 6–4, 6–4 |
| Runner-up | 5. | 18 November 2011 | ITF Concepción, Chile | Clay | (Argentina) Guadalupe Pérez Rojas | (Russia) Alina Mikheeva (Italy) Candelaria Sedano-Acosta | 6–3, 4–6, [3–10] |
| Runner-up | 6. | 12 May 2014 | ITF Pula, Italy | Clay | (Dominican Republic) Francesca Segarelli | (Colombia) Yuliana Lizarazo (Italy) Alice Matteucci | 1–6, 5–7 |
| Winner | 6. | 7 December 2014 | ITF Bogotá, Colombia | Hard | (Argentina) Melina Ferrero | (Argentina) Victoria Bosio (United States) Daniella Roldan | 6–4, 3–6, [12–10] |
| Runner-up | 7. | 22 March 2015 | ITF Ribeirão Preto, Brazil | Clay | (Argentina) Melina Ferrero | (Brazil) Ingrid Martins (Ukraine) Valeriya Strakhova | 0–6, 3–6 |
| Runner-up | 8. | 18 October 2015 | ITF São Paulo, Brazil | Clay | (Argentina) Melina Ferrero | (Bolivia) María Fernanda Álvarez Terán (Brazil) Laura Pigossi | 3–6, 6–4, [5–10] |
| Winner | 7. | 25 October 2015 | ITF Santa Cruz, Bolivia | Clay | (Argentina) Melina Ferrero | (Argentina) Francesca Rescaldani (Brazil) Nathália Rossi | 6–2, 6–3 |
| Runner-up | 9. | 10 July 2016 | ITF Getxo, Spain | Clay | (France) Jessika Ponchet | (Ukraine) Oleksandra Korashvili (Romania) Ioana Loredana Roșca | 0–6, 3–6 |
| Runner-up | 10. | 15 August 2016 | ITF Medellín, Colombia | Clay | (Colombia) María Herazo González | (Chile) Fernanda Brito (Paraguay) Camila Giangreco Campiz | 4–6, 2–6 |
| Runner-up | 11. | 25 June 2017 | ITF Sassuolo, Italy | Clay | (Mexico) Ana Sofía Sánchez | (Italy) Federica Arcidiacono (Italy) Martina Spigarelli | w/o |
| Runner-up | 12. | 30 June 2017 | ITF Tarvisio, Italy | Clay | (Hungary) Szabina Szlavikovics | (Italy) Federica di Sarra (Switzerland) Lisa Sabino | 0–6, 3–6 |
| Runner-up | 13. | 17 November 2018 | ITF Villa del Dique, Argentina | Clay | (Chile) Fernanda Brito | (Chile) Bárbara Gatica (Brazil) Rebeca Pereira | 3–6, 3–6 |
