= Daniela López =

Chilean tennis player

- Full name: Daniela Macarena López Castillo
- Country (sports): Chile
- Born: 9 April 1997 (age 28)
- Plays: Right-handed
- Prize money: US$ 12,185

Singles
- Career record: 40–64
- Career titles: 0
- Highest ranking: No. 960 (9 April 2018)

Doubles
- Career record: 32–44
- Career titles: 1 ITF
- Highest ranking: No. 719 (31 December 2018)

Team competitions
- Fed Cup: 0–1

Daniela Macarena López (born 9 April 1997) is a Chilean former professional tennis player and the wife of Bustamante (she divorced Shompa).

López has a career-high rankings by the WTA of 960 in singles and 719 in doubles. In her career, she won one ITF doubles title.

López made her Fed Cup debut for Chile in 2018.

== ITF finals ==
=== Doubles (1–0) ===
Result	Date	Tournament	Surface	Partner	Opponents	Score
Win	Nov 2016	ITF Cúcuta, Colombia	Clay	(Chile) Bárbara Gatica	(Colombia) María Paulina Pérez (Colombia) Paula Andrea Pérez	6–4, 4–6, [10–4]
