= Gabriela Cé =

Brazilian tennis player

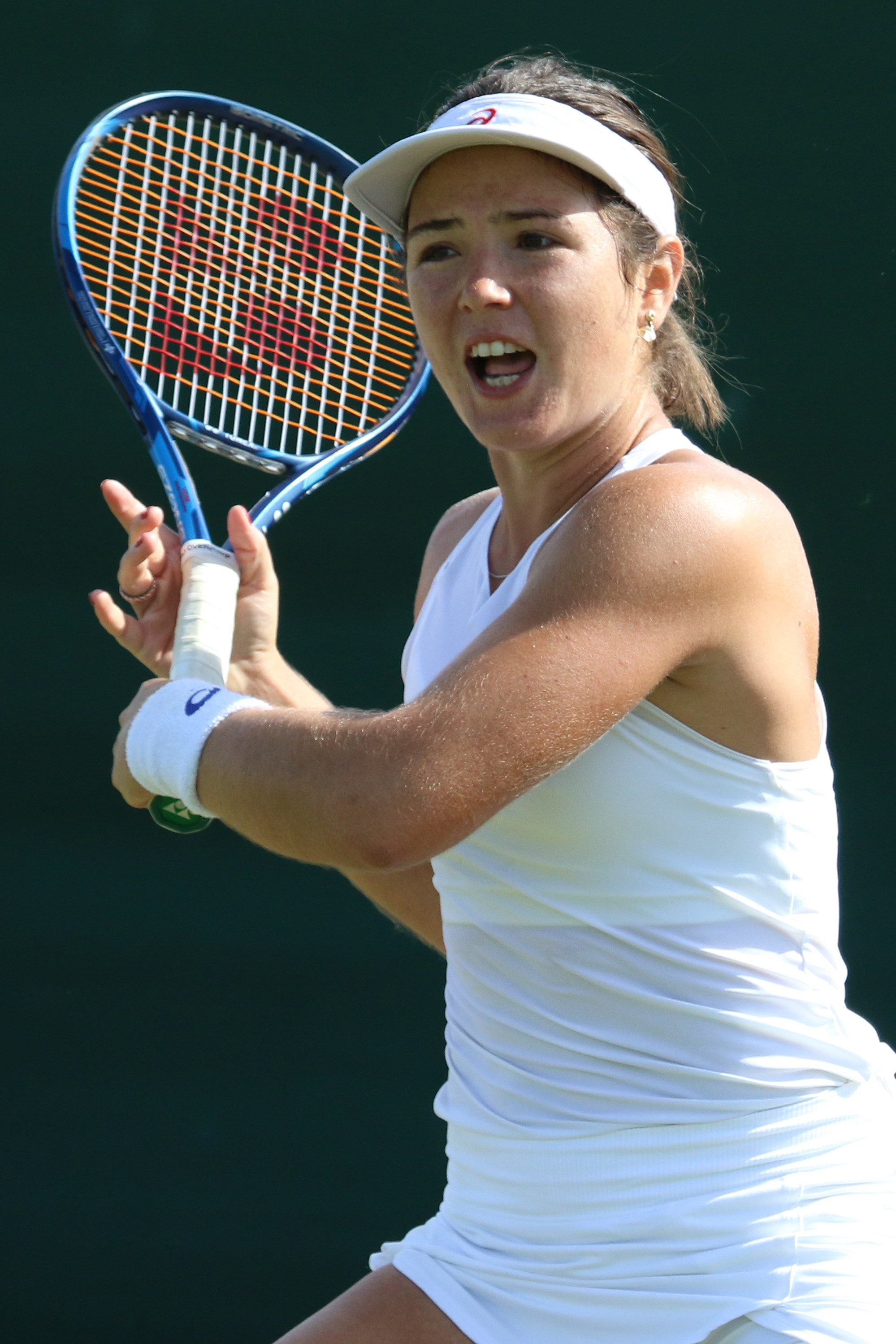
- Cé at the 2022 Wimbledon Championships
- Full name: Gabriela Vianna Cé
- Country (sports): Brazil
- Born: 3 March 1993 (age 33) Porto Alegre, Brazil
- Height: 1.64 m (5 ft 5 in)
- Prize money: US$ 382,797

Singles
- Career record: 487–382
- Career titles: 14 ITF
- Highest ranking: No. 221 (9 September 2019)
- Current ranking: No. 337 (18 May 2026)

Grand Slam singles results
- Australian Open: Q1 (2020, 2021)
- French Open: Q1 (2020)
- Wimbledon: Q1 (2022)
- US Open: Q1 (2015)

Doubles
- Career record: 268–196
- Career titles: 1 WTA 125, 21 ITF
- Highest ranking: No. 109 (18 April 2016)
- Current ranking: No. 1,156 (18 May 2026)

Team competitions
- Fed Cup: 11–9
- Last updated on: 24 May 2026.

Gabriela Vianna Cé (born 3 March 1993) is a Brazilian professional tennis player. She has a career-high WTA singles ranking of No. 221, achieved on 9 September 2019, and a best doubles ranking of No. 109, reached on 18 April 2016. She has won one WTA Challenger title and multiple trophies on ITF Women's Circuit.

Playing for the Brazil Billie Jean King Cup team (formerly Brazil Fed Cup team) since 2014, Cé has a win–loss record of 11–9.

Cé has won one WTA 125 title in doubles in her career, along with 14 singles titles and 21 doubles titles on the ITF Circuit.

== Career overview ==
=== 2015: First WTA 125 doubles title ===
In late November 2015, partnering with experienced Paraguayan Verónica Cepede, Cé won the doubles title at the WTA Carlsbad in the United States. In the final, they defeated Oksana Kalashnikova of Georgia and German Tatjana Maria, the tournament's top seeds, by 1–6, 6–4, [10–8]. This was Cé's eighth career title and her first in a tournament on the WTA Tour.

== Grand Slam singles performance timelines ==
Key
W	F	SF	QF	#R	RR	Q#	DNQ	A	NH

(W) winner; (F) finalist; (SF) semifinalist; (QF) quarterfinalist; (#R) rounds 4, 3, 2, 1; (RR) round-robin stage; (Q#) qualification round; (DNQ) did not qualify; (A) absent; (NH) not held; (SR) strike rate (events won / competed); (W–L) win–loss record.
To avoid confusion and double counting, these charts are updated at the conclusion of a tournament or when the player's participation has ended.

Tournament	2015	...	2020	2021	2022	SR	W–L
Australian Open	A		Q1	Q1	A	0 / 0	0–0
French Open	A		Q1	A	A	0 / 0	0–0
Wimbledon	A		NH	A	Q1	0 / 0	0–0
US Open	Q1		A	A	A	0 / 0	0–0
Win–loss	0–0		0–0	0–0	0–0	0 / 0	0–0
Career statistics
Year-end ranking (Note: 2016: WTA ranking–513, 2017: WTA ranking–403, 2018: WTA ranking–388, 2019: WTA ranking–243.)	241		239	286	252		

== WTA Tour finals ==
=== Doubles: 1 (runner-up) ===
Legend WTA 250 / International (Note: The WTA International tournaments were reclassified as WTA 250 tournaments in 2021.) (0–1)	Finals by surface Clay (0–1)

Result	W–L	Date	Tournament	Tier	Surface	Partner	Opponents	Score
Loss	0–1	Apr 2016	Copa Colsanitas, Colombia	International	Clay	(Venezuela) Andrea Gámiz	(Spain) Lara Arruabarrena (Germany) Tatjana Maria	2–6, 6–4, [8–10]

== WTA 125 finals ==
=== Doubles: 1 (title) ===
Result	W–L	Date	Tournament	Surface	Partner	Opponents	Score
Win	1–0	Nov 2015	Carlsbad Classic, United States	Hard	(Paraguay) Verónica Cepede Royg	(Georgia (country)) Oksana Kalashnikova (Germany) Tatjana Maria	1–6, 6–4, [10–8]

== ITF Circuit finals ==
=== Singles: 32 (16 titles, 16 runner-ups) ===
Legend $60,000 tournaments $25,000 tournaments $10/15,000 tournaments	Finals by surface Hard (2–2) Clay (14–14)

Result	W–L	Date	Tournament	Tier	Surface	Opponent	Score
Loss	0–1	Nov 2011	ITF Salvador, Brazil	W10	Hard	(Ecuador) Doménica González	6–3, 3–6, 2–6
Win	1–1	Mar 2012	ITF Ribeirão Preto, Brazil	W10	Clay	(South Africa) Natasha Fourouclas	6–1, 6–0
Loss	1–2	Apr 2012	ITF São Paulo, Brazil	W10	Clay	(Venezuela) Gabriela Paz	4–6, 2–6
Win	2–2	Jun 2013	ITF Santos, Brazil	W10	Clay	(Brazil) Ana Clara Duarte	7–6^{(2)}, 6–2
Loss	2–3	Aug 2013	ITF São Paulo, Brazil	W10	Clay	(Peru) Bianca Botto	6–7^{(2)}, 7–5, 2–6
Win	3–3	Nov 2013	ITF São José do Rio Preto, Brazil	W10	Clay	(Brazil) Carolina Alves	6–2, 4–6, 7–5
Win	4–3	Nov 2013	ITF São José do Rio Preto, Brazil	W10	Clay	(Brazil) Nathália Rossi	7–6^{(3)}, 6–3
Win	5–3	Nov 2013	ITF São Paulo, Brazil	W10	Clay	(Argentina) Andrea Benítez	7–6^{(5)}, 7–5
Win	6–3	Mar 2014	ITF Santiago, Chile	W10	Clay	(Chile) Fernanda Brito	6–3, 7–5
Loss	6–4	Mar 2014	ITF Ribeirão Preto, Brazil	W10	Clay	(Argentina) Victoria Bosio	0–6, 5–7
Win	7–4	Apr 2014	ITF São José do Rio Preto, Brazil	W10	Clay	(Brazil) Paula Cristina Gonçalves	1–1 ret.
Win	8–4	Jul 2014	ITF Campos do Jordão, Brazil	W15	Hard	(Brazil) Eduarda Piai	6–3, 6–2
Loss	8–5	Aug 2014	ITF Bad Saulgau, Germany	W25	Clay	(Ukraine) Maryna Zanevska	0–6, 4–6
Loss	8–6	Mar 2016	ITF São José dos Campos, Brazil	W10	Clay	(Argentina) Nadia Podoroska	6–7^{(2)}, 1–6
Win	9–6	Jul 2017	ITF Campos do Jordão, Brazil	W15	Hard	(Argentina) Guillermina Naya	6–4, 7–6^{(3)}
Loss	9–7	Jul 2017	ITF Campos do Jordão, Brazil	W15	Hard	(Brazil) Nathaly Kurata	6–7^{(7)}, 4–6
Loss	9–8	Aug 2018	ITF Guayaquil, Ecuador	W15	Clay	(Chile) Fernanda Brito	5–7, 4–6
Loss	9–9	Sep 2018	ITF Asunción, Paraguay	W15	Clay	(Chile) Fernanda Brito	3–6, 3–6
Win	10–9	Sep 2018	ITF Lique, Paraguay	W15	Clay	(Chile) Bárbara Gatica	7–6^{(3)} 6–2
Loss	10–10	Oct 2018	ITF Santa Margherita di Pula, Italy	W25	Clay	(Italy) Martina di Giuseppe	3–6, 4–6
Loss	10–11	May 2019	ITF Santa Margherita di Pula, Italy	W25	Clay	(Sweden) Mirjam Björklund	3–6, 6–7^{(3)}
Loss	10–12	May 2019	ITF Rome, Italy	W25	Clay	(Chile) Daniela Seguel	1–6, 5–7
Loss	10–13	May 2021	ITF Antalya, Turkey	W15	Clay	(Romania) Cristina Dinu	3–6, 0–6
Loss	10–14	Jun 2021	ITF Charleston Pro, United States	W60	Clay	(Greece) Despina Papamichail	6–1, 3–6, 3–6
Loss	10–15	Jul 2021	ITF Tarvisio, Italy	W25	Clay	(Romania) Cristina Dinu	2–6, 0–6
Win	11–15	Nov 2021	ITF Curitiba, Brazil	W15	Clay	(Brazil) Thaísa Grana Pedretti	3–0 ret.
Win	12–15	Aug 2022	ITF Rio de Janeiro, Brazil	W25	Clay	(Bolivia) Noelia Zeballos	4–6, 7–5, 6–3
Loss	12–16	Oct 2022	ITF Ibagué, Colombia	W25	Clay	(Colombia) María Herazo González	3–6, 3–6
Win	13–16	May 2024	ITF Nova Gorica, Slovenia	W15	Clay	(Ukraine) Veronika Podrez	7–6^{(4)}, 7–5
Win	14–16	Jul 2024	ITF Brežice, Slovenia	W15	Clay	(Croatia) Iva Primorac	6–4, 6–4
Win	15–16	Jun 2026	ITF San Gregorio, Italy	W35	Clay	(Latvia) Beatrise Zeltiņa	6–2, 6–3
Win	16–16	Aug 2026	ITF Trieste, Italy	W35	Clay	(Slovenia) Pia Lovrič	4–6, 6–1, 6–4

=== Doubles: 43 (21 titles, 22 runner-ups) ===
Legend $60,000 tournaments $25,000 tournaments $10/15,000 tournaments	Finals by surface Hard (2–2) Clay (19–20)

Result	W–L	Date	Tournament	Tier	Surface	Partner	Opponents	Score
Win	1–0	Oct 2010	ITF Itu, Brazil	W10	Clay	(Brazil) Vivian Segnini	(Brazil) Flávia Dechandt Araújo (Brazil) Carla Forte	6–0, 6–4
Win	2–0	Apr 2011	ITF Ribeirão Preto, Brazil	W10	Clay	(Russia) Irina Khromacheva	(Brazil) Monique Albuquerque (Brazil) Isabela Miró	6–2, 6–4
Win	3–0	Apr 2011	ITF São Paulo, Brazil	W10	Clay	(Brazil) Carla Forte	(Brazil) Isabela Miró (Brazil) Nathália Rossi	7–6^{(5)}, 6–4
Loss	3–1	Sep 2011	ITF São Paulo, Brazil	W10	Clay	(Brazil) Flávia Guimarães Bueno	(Argentina) María Irigoyen (Argentina) Carla Lucero	6–7^{(10)}, 4–6
Win	4–1	Oct 2011	ITF São Paulo, Brazil	W10	Clay	(Brazil) Maria Fernanda Alves	(Brazil) Flávia Dechandt Araújo (Brazil) Paula Cristina Gonçalves	6–2, 6–4
Loss	4–2	Oct 2011	ITF São Paulo, Brazil	W10	Clay	(Chile) Cecilia Costa Melgar	(Brazil) Maria Fernanda Alves (Brazil) Karina Venditti	2–6, 4–6
Loss	4–3	Oct 2011	ITF Goiânia, Brazil	W10	Clay	(Brazil) Maria Fernanda Alves	(Paraguay) Jazmín Britos (Argentina) Carla Lucero	6–0, 4–6, [6–10]
Win	5–3	Mar 2012	ITF Ribeirão Preto, Brazil	W10	Clay	(Brazil) Carla Forte	(Paraguay) Isabella Robbiani (Argentina) Carolina Zeballos	6–1, 3–6, [10–7]
Loss	5–4	Apr 2012	ITF Ribeirão Preto, Brazil	W10	Hard	(Brazil) Carla Forte	(Chile) Fernanda Brito (Brazil) Raquel Piltcher	3–6, 7–5, [7–10]
Loss	5–5	Apr 2012	ITF São Paulo, Brazil	W10	Clay	(Brazil) Carla Forte	(Brazil) Ana Clara Duarte (Venezuela) Gabriela Paz	7–5, 3–6, [5–10]
Loss	5–6	Jun 2012	ITF Santos, Brazil	W10	Clay	(Brazil) Raquel Piltcher	(Brazil) Eduarda Piai (Brazil) Karina Venditti	3–6, 6–7^{(4)}
Loss	5–7	Aug 2013	ITF Fleurus, Belgium	W25	Clay	(Chile) Daniela Seguel	(Russia) Irina Khromacheva (Latvia) Diāna Marcinkēviča	4–6, 3–6
Win	6–7	Nov 2013	ITF São José do Rio Preto, Brazil	W10	Clay	(Brazil) Nathália Rossi	(Brazil) Carolina Alves (Brazil) Juliana Rocha Cardoso	6–3, 6–4
Loss	6–8	Nov 2013	ITF São José do Rio Preto, Brazil	W10	Clay	(Brazil) Nathália Rossi	(Brazil) Suellen Abel (Brazil) Eduarda Piai	3–6, 6–7^{(3)}
Loss	6–9	Nov 2013	ITF São Paulo, Brazil	W10	Clay	(Chinese Taipei) Lee Pei-chi	(Brazil) Nathaly Kurata (Brazil) Eduarda Piai	1–6, 6–1, [8–10]
Loss	6–10	Mar 2014	ITF Ribeirão Preto, Brazil	W10	Clay	(Brazil) Eduarda Piai	(Brazil) Maria Fernanda Alves (Brazil) Ana Clara Duarte	4–6, 6–4, [9–11]
Loss	6–11	Mar 2014	ITF São José dos Campos, Brazil	W10	Clay	(Brazil) Eduarda Piai	(Brazil) Maria Fernanda Alves (Brazil) Paula Cristina Gonçalves	6–7^{(0)}, 5–7
Loss	6–12	Jun 2014	ITF Périgueux, France	W25	Clay	(Argentina) Florencia Molinero	(Venezuela) Andrea Gámiz (Spain) Sara Sorribes Tormo	7–5, 4–6, [8–10]
Loss	6–13	Mar 2015	ITF São José dos Campos, Brazil	W10	Clay	(Brazil) Laura Pigossi	(Brazil) Carolina Alves (Argentina) Victoria Bosio	6–7^{(3)}, 4–6
Win	7–13	Jun 2015	ITF Périgueux, France	W25	Clay	(Argentina) Florencia Molinero	(Mexico) Victoria Rodríguez (Mexico) Marcela Zacarías	6–3, 6–2
Win	8–13	Feb 2016	ITF Campinas, Brazil	W25	Clay	(Argentina) Florencia Molinero	(Argentina) Guadalupe Pérez Rojas (Argentina) Nadia Podoroska	1–6, 6–4, [10–4]
Win	9–13	May 2016	ITF Naples, United States	W25	Clay	(Poland) Justyna Jegiołka	(United States) Sophie Chang (Mexico) Renata Zarazúa	6–1, 6–2
Loss	9–14	Oct 2016	ITF Toowoomba, Australia	W25	Hard	(Slovakia) Tereza Mihalíková	(Hungary) Dalma Gálfi (Slovakia) Viktória Kužmová	4–6, 6–7^{(4)}
Win	10–14	Mar 2017	ITF Curitiba, Brazil	W25	Clay	(Venezuela) Andrea Gámiz	(Brazil) Laura Pigossi (Switzerland) Jil Teichmann	4–6, 6–2, [10–2]
Loss	10–15	Mar 2017	ITF São Paulo, Brazil	W25	Clay	(Venezuela) Andrea Gámiz	(Argentina) Catalina Pella (Chile) Daniela Seguel	5–7, 6–3, [5–10]
Win	11–15	Mar 2017	ITF Campinas, Brazil	W15	Clay	(Brazil) Thaisa Grana Pedretti	(Brazil) Nathaly Kurata (Brazil) Giovanna Tomita	6–1, 6–3
Win	12–15	Apr 2017	ITF São José dos Campos, Brazil	W15	Clay	(Brazil) Thaisa Grana Pedretti	(Argentina) Victoria Bosio (Argentina) Julieta Lara Estable	5–7, 7–6^{(6)}, [10–3]
Win	13–15	Apr 2017	ITF Hammamet, Tunisia	W15	Clay	(Venezuela) Andrea Gámiz	(France) Manon Arcangioli (France) Jessika Ponchet	6–1, 6–2
Loss	13–16	Jun 2017	ITF Padova, Italy	W25	Clay	(Argentina) Catalina Pella	(Italy) Cristiana Ferrando (Italy) Alice Matteucci	6–2, 0–6, [9–11]
Loss	13–17	Jun 2017	ITF Lenzerheide, Switzerland	W25	Clay	(Argentina) Catalina Pella	(Switzerland) Amra Sadiković (Switzerland) Nina Stadler	6–2, 4–6, [1–10]
Win	14–17	Jul 2017	ITF Campos do Jordão, Brazil	W15	Hard	(Brazil) Thaisa Grana Pedretti	(Brazil) Nathaly Kurata (Brazil) Eduarda Piai	7–5, 6–4
Win	15–17	Aug 2017	Mençuna Cup, Turkey	W60	Hard	(India) Ankita Raina	(Bulgaria) Elitsa Kostova (Russia) Yana Sizikova	6–2, 6–3
Win	16–17	Sep 2017	ITF Almaty, Kazakhstan	W25	Clay	(Russia) Yana Sizikova	(Uzbekistan) Nigina Abduraimova (Uzbekistan) Akgul Amanmuradova	6–4, 3–6, [10–7]
Loss	16–18	Sep 2017	ITF Santa Margherita di Pula, Italy	W25	Clay	(Argentina) Catalina Pella	(Italy) Claudia Giovine (Croatia) Tereza Mrdeža	3–6, 1–6
Loss	16–19	Mar 2019	ITF Campinas, Brazil	W25	Clay	(Brazil) Carolina Alves	(Montenegro) Danka Kovinić (Brazil) Laura Pigossi	3–6, 2–6
Win	17–19	May 2019	ITF Santa Margherita di Pula, Italy	W25	Clay	(United States) Chiara Scholl	(United Kingdom) Naiktha Bains (Hungary) Anna Bondár	6–0, 7–5
Loss	17–20	May 2019	ITF Rome, Italy	W25	Clay	(Romania) Cristina Dinu	(Australia) Arina Rodionova (Australia) Storm Sanders	2–6, 3–6
Loss	17–21	Jun 2019	ITF Padova, Italy	W25	Clay	(Brazil) Carolina Alves	(Romania) Cristina Dinu (Italy) Angelica Moratelli	6–7^{(7)}, 6–3, [8–10]
Win	18–21	Jun 2019	ITF Tarvisio, Italy	W25	Clay	(Brazil) Paula Cristina Gonçalves	(Italy) Gloria Ceschi (United States) Rasheeda McAdoo	6–2, 4–6, [10–3]
Win	19–21	Sep 2019	ITF Bagnatica, Italy	W25	Clay	(Brazil) Carolina Alves	(Italy) Martina Caregaro (Italy) Federica di Sarra	6–2, 1–6, [10–5]
Win	20–21	Jan 2021	ITF Antalya, Turkey	W15	Clay	(Argentina) Victoria Bosio	(Japan) Miyu Kato (Japan) Haine Ogata	6–4, 6–3
Loss	20–22	May 2021	ITF Oeiras, Portugal	W25	Clay	(India) Riya Bhatia	(Hungary) Adrienn Nagy (South Korea) Park So-hyun	4–6, 0–6
Win	21–22	May 2021	ITF Antalya, Turkey	W15	Clay	(Romania) Cristina Dinu	(Germany) Katharina Hering (Germany) Natalia Siedliska	7–5, 6–1
