= Nathaly Kurata =

Brazilian tennis player

- Full name: Nathaly Junko Shimizu Kurata
- Country (sports): Brazil
- Born: 10 February 1993 (age 32)
- Plays: Right (two-handed backhand)
- Prize money: $79,592

Singles
- Career record: 282–184
- Career titles: 4 ITF
- Highest ranking: No. 399 (16 July 2018)

Doubles
- Career record: 131–136
- Career titles: 5 ITF
- Highest ranking: No. 387 (24 November 2014)

Team competitions
- Fed Cup: 1–2

Nathaly Junko Shimizu Kurata (born 10 February 1993) is a Brazilian former tennis player.

She has career-high WTA rankings of 399 in singles, achieved on 16 July 2018, and 387 in doubles, reached on 24 November 2014. Kurata won four singles and five doubles titles on the ITF Women's Circuit.

She made her debut for the Brazil Fed Cup team in 2018. Since then, she has accumulated a win-loss record of 1–2.

== ITF Circuit finals ==
$25,000 tournaments
$15,000 tournaments
$10,000 tournaments

=== Singles: 8 (4 titles, 4 runner-ups) ===
| Result | No. | Date | Tournament | Surface | Opponent | Score |
|---|---|---|---|---|---|---|
| Loss | 1. | Jun 2011 | ITF São José dos Campos, Brazil | Clay | (Brazil) Maria Fernanda Alves | 4–6, 5–7 |
| Loss | 2. | Sep 2013 | ITF Curitiba, Brazil | Clay | (Brazil) Ana Clara Duarte | 1–6, 4–6 |
| Win | 3. | Oct 2014 | ITF Lima, Peru | Clay | (Chile) Fernanda Brito | 6–1, 6–1 |
| Win | 4. | Apr 2017 | ITF São José dos Campos, Brazil | Clay | (Argentina) Julieta Estable | 7–6^{(3)}, 6–0 |
| Win | 5. | Jul 2017 | ITF Campos do Jordão, Brazil | Hard | (Brazil) Gabriela Cé | 7–6^{(7)}, 6–4 |
| Loss | 6. | Nov 2017 | ITF Encarnación, Paraguay | Clay | (Paraguay) Camila Giangreco Campiz | 4–6, 2–6 |
| Win | 7. | Dec 2017 | ITF Catanduva, Brazil | Clay | (Brazil) Eduarda Piai | 6–1, 6–4 |
| Loss | 8. | Jun 2019 | ITF Klosters, Switzerland | Clay | (Austria) Julia Grabher | 1–6, 3–6 |

=== Doubles: 19 (5 titles, 14 runner-ups) ===
| Result | No. | Date | Tournament | Surface | Partner | Opponents | Score |
|---|---|---|---|---|---|---|---|
| Loss | 1. | 3 June 2013 | Santos, Brazil | Clay | (Brazil) Ana Clara Duarte | (Argentina) Andrea Benítez (Brazil) Carla Forte | 4–6, 1–6 |
| Win | 2. | 25 November 2013 | São Paulo, Brazil | Clay | (Brazil) Eduarda Piai | (Brazil) Gabriela Cé (Chinese Taipei) Lee Pei-chi | 6–2, 1–6, [10–8] |
| Loss | 3. | 9 June 2014 | Villa del Dique, Argentina | Clay | (Brazil) Nathália Rossi | (Brazil) Carolina Alves (Argentina) Constanza Vega | 6–7^{(4)}, 2–6 |
| Win | 4. | 25 July 2014 | Campos do Jordão, Brazil | Hard | (Brazil) Giovanna Tomita | (Brazil) Carolina Alves (Brazil) Ingrid Martins | 6–3, 6–2 |
| Loss | 5. | 25 August 2014 | Quito, Ecuador | Clay | (Brazil) Eduarda Piai | (Colombia) María Paulina Pérez (Colombia) Paula Andrea Pérez | 5–7, 6–7^{(5)} |
| Loss | 6. | 24 October 2014 | Lima, Peru | Clay | (Chile) Cecilia Costa Melgar | (Argentina) Sofía Luini (Argentina) Guadalupe Pérez Rojas | 4–6, 3–6 |
| Loss | 7. | 10 May 2015 | Villa María, Argentina | Clay | (Brazil) Eduarda Piai | (Argentina) Ana Gobbi Monllau (Argentina) Constanza Vega | 2–6, 3–6 |
| Loss | 8. | 2 August 2015 | Buenos Aires, Argentina | Clay | (Brazil) Eduarda Piai | (Chile) Fernanda Brito (Chile) Daniela Seguel | 2–6, 2–6 |
| Loss | 9. | 9 August 2015 | Buenos Aires, Argentina | Clay | (Brazil) Eduarda Piai | (Chile) Fernanda Brito (Chile) Daniela Seguel | 3–6, 2–6 |
| Win | 10. | 22 April 2016 | Bauru, Brazil | Clay | (Brazil) Eduarda Piai | (Brazil) Carolina Alves (Argentina) Julieta Estable | 7–6^{(4)}, 7–5 |
| Loss | 11. | 25 April 2016 | Villa del Dique, Argentina | Clay | (Brazil) Eduarda Piai | (Chile) Fernanda Brito (Paraguay) Camila Giangreco Campiz | 3–6, 5–7 |
| Loss | 12. | 27 March 2017 | Campinas, Brazil | Clay | (Brazil) Giovanna Tomita | (Brazil) Gabriela Cé (Brazil) Thaisa Grana Pedretti | 1–6, 3–6 |
| Loss | 13. | 18 June 2017 | Hammamet, Tunisia | Clay | (Brazil) Eduarda Piai | (Colombia) María Paulina Pérez (Colombia) Paula Andrea Pérez | 3–6, 3–6 |
| Loss | 14. | 16 July 2017 | Campos do Jordão, Brazil | Clay | (Brazil) Rebeca Pereira | (Brazil) Ingrid Martins (Paraguay) Camila Giangreco Campiz | 3–6, 6–7^{(1)} |
| Loss | 15. | 30 July 2017 | Campos do Jordão | Hard | (Brazil) Eduarda Piai | (Brazil) Gabriela Cé (Brazil) Thaisa Grana Pedretti | 5–7, 4–6 |
| Loss | 16. | 4 November 2017 | Asunción, Paraguay | Clay | (Brazil) Thaisa Grana Pedretti | (Chile) Fernanda Brito (Paraguay) Camila Giangreco Campiz | 6–7^{(7)}, 4–6 |
| Loss | 17. | 11 November 2017 | Encarnación, Paraguay | Clay | (Brazil) Thaisa Grana Pedretti | (Paraguay) Lara Escauriza (Chile) Bárbara Gatica | 4–6, 4–6 |
| Win | 18. | 3 December 2017 | Catanduva, Brazil | Clay | (Brazil) Eduarda Piai | (Argentina) Melina Ferrero (Argentina) Sofía Luini | 6–2, 6–3 |
| Win | 19. | 28 April 2018 | Villa del Dique, Argentina | Clay | (Brazil) Eduarda Piai | (Chile) Fernanda Brito (Peru) Dominique Schaefer | 6–0, 6–4 |
