= Bárbara Gatica =

Chilean tennis player

- Country (sports): Chile
- Born: 16 August 1996 (age 30) Santiago, Chile
- Plays: Right (one-handed backhand)
- Prize money: US$ 117,949

Singles
- Career record: 261–166
- Career titles: 2 ITF
- Highest ranking: No. 201 (18 July 2022)

Doubles
- Career record: 217–138
- Career titles: 18 ITF
- Highest ranking: No. 158 (18 July 2022)

Team competitions
- Fed Cup: 17–12
- Last updated on: 22 February 2024.

Bárbara Gatica (born 16 August 1996) is a Chilean tennis player.

She has career-high WTA rankings of 201 in singles, achieved on 18 July 2022, and 158 in doubles, reached the same week. To date, Gatica has won two singles titles and 18 doubles titles on the ITF Women's Circuit.

Playing for Chile in Fed Cup competition, Gatica has a win–loss record of 17–12 (doubles: 13–4).

In June 2022, Gatica was provisionally suspended from competing, after testing positive for boldenone in April of that year. In December, Gatica was fined $5,000 and banned from professional tennis for three years after she admitted to being paid to deliberately lose a match in 2016.

== ITF Circuit finals ==
=== Singles: 12 (3 titles, 9 runner–ups) ===
Legend $60,000 tournaments $25,000 tournaments $15,000 tournaments	Finals by surface Hard (1–3) Clay (2–6)

Result	W–L	Date	Tournament	Tier	Surface	Opponent	Score
Win	1–0	May 2017	ITF Antalya, Turkey	15,000	Clay	(Russia) Amina Anshba	6–2, 7–5
Loss	1–1	Sep 2017	ITF Antalya, Turkey	15,000	Clay	(Greece) Despina Papamichail	3–6, 3–6
Loss	1–2	Aug 2018	ITF Guayaquil, Ecuador	15,000	Clay	(Chile) Fernanda Brito	2–6, 2–6
Loss	1–3	Sep 2018	ITF Luque, Paraguay	15,000	Hard	(Brazil) Gabriela Cé	6–7^{(3)}, 2–6
Loss	1–4	May 2019	ITF Tabarka, Tunisia	15,000	Clay	(Argentina) Julieta Lara Estable	2–6, 6–3, 6–7^{(5)}
Loss	1–5	Jun 2019	ITF Tabarka, Tunisia	15,000	Clay	(Egypt) Mayar Sherif	4–6, 4–6
Loss	1–6	Oct 2020	ITF Monastir, Tunisia	15,000	Hard	(Germany) Sina Herrmann	4–6, 4–6
Loss	1–7	Jan 2022	ITF Florianopolis, Brazil	25,000	Hard	(United States) Elizabeth Mandlik	0–6, 4–6
Win	2–7	Mar 2022	ITF Salinas, Ecuador	25,000	Hard	(Netherlands) Suzan Lamens	6–4, 7–6^{(2)}
Loss	2–8	May 2022	ITF Roma, Italy	60,000	Clay	(Croatia) Tena Lukas	1–6, 4–6
Win	3–8	Oct 2026	ITF Maceió, Brazil	W15	Clay (i)	(Mexico) Ana Sofía Sánchez	7–5, 6–0
Loss	3–9	Nov 2026	ITF São Carlos, Brazil	W15	Clay	(Switzerland) Marie Mettraux	7–5, 1–6, 3–6

=== Doubles: 40 (20 titles, 20 runner–ups) ===
Legend $60,000 tournaments $25,000 tournaments $10/15,000 tournaments	Finals by surface Hard (2–2) Clay (18–18)

Result	W–L	Date	Tournament	Tier	Surface	Partner	Opponents	Score
Loss	0–1	Jun 2015	ITF Manzanillo, Mexico	10,000	Hard	(Argentina) Stephanie Petit	(United States) Zoë Gwen Scandalis (Mexico) Renata Zarazúa	1–6, 2–6
Loss	0–2	Sep 2015	ITF San Carlos Centro, Argentina	10,000	Clay	(Argentina) Stephanie Petit	(Bolivia) María Fernanda Álvarez Terán (Argentina) Catalina Pella	2–6, 0–6
Win	1–2	Apr 2016	ITF Lins, Brazil	10,000	Clay	(Argentina) Stephanie Petit	(Argentina) Paula Ormaechea (Argentina) Constanza Vega	7–5, 6–3
Loss	1–3	May 2016	ITF Villa María, Argentina	10,000	Clay	(Argentina) Stephanie Petit	(Brazil) Carolina Alves (Argentina) Constanza Vega	1–6, 6–7^{(4)}
Win	2–3	Jul 2016	ITF Schio, Italy	10,000	Clay	(Colombia) María Herazo González	(Italy) Alice Balducci (Italy) Deborah Chiesa	7–5, 1–6, [10–5]
Win	3–3	Nov 2016	ITF Cúcuta, Colombia	10,000	Clay	(Chile) Daniela López	(Colombia) María Paulina Pérez (Colombia) Paula Andrea Pérez	6–4, 4–6, [10–4]
Win	4–3	May 2017	ITF Benavídez, Argentina	15,000	Hard	(Argentina) Stephanie Petit	(Hungary) Naomi Totka (United States) Madison Bourguignon	6–2, 7–6^{(1)}
Loss	4–4	Sep 2017	ITF Antalya, Turkey	15,000	Clay	(Paraguay) Lara Escauriza	(Russia) Aleksandra Pospelova (Moldova) Adriana Sosnovschi	6–7^{(2)}, 5–7
Win	5–4	Sep 2017	ITF Antalya, Turkey	15,000	Clay	(Paraguay) Lara Escauriza	(Netherlands) Suzan Lamens (Netherlands) Erika Vogelsang	7–5, 6–4
Loss	5–5	Oct 2017	ITF Buenos Aires, Argentina	15,000	Clay	(Argentina) Guillermina Naya	(Chile) Fernanda Brito (Paraguay) Camila Giangreco Campiz	5–7, 6–0, [5–10]
Win	6–5	Nov 2017	ITF Encarnación, Paraguay	15,000	Clay	(Paraguay) Lara Escauriza	(Brazil) Nathaly Kurata (Brazil) Thaisa Grana Pedretti	6–4, 6–4
Win	7–5	Apr 2018	ITF Villa Dolores, Argentina	15,000	Clay	(Brazil) Rebeca Pereira	(Argentina) Victoria Bosio (Argentina) Julieta Lara Estable	6–2, 6–4
Loss	7–6	Aug 2018	ITF Guayaquil, Ecuador	15,000	Clay	(Brazil) Rebeca Pereira	(Chile) Fernanda Brito (Argentina) Sofía Luini	1–6, 0–6
Loss	7–7	Aug 2018	ITF Lambaré, Paraguay	15,000	Clay	(Brazil) Rebeca Pereira	(Chile) Fernanda Brito (Paraguay) Camila Giangreco Campiz	4–6, 6–4, [3–10]
Win	8–7	Sep 2018	ITF Hilton Head, United States	15,000	Clay	(Brazil) Rebeca Pereira	(United States) Allura Zamarripa (United States) Maribella Zamarripa	7–6^{(2)}, 3–6, [11–9]
Loss	8–8	Nov 2018	Copa Santiago, Chile	60,000	Clay	(Brazil) Rebeca Pereira	(United States) Quinn Gleason (Brazil) Luisa Stefani	0–6, 6–4, [7–10]
Win	9–8	Nov 2018	ITF Villa del Dique, Argentina	15,000	Clay	(Brazil) Rebeca Pereira	(Chile) Fernanda Brito (Argentina) Carla Lucero	6–3, 6–3
Loss	9–9	Mar 2019	ITF Antalya, Turkey	15,000	Clay	(Brazil) Rebeca Pereira	(Japan) Rina Saigo (Japan) Yukina Saigo	6–4, 2–6, [5–10]
Loss	9–10	May 2019	ITF Tabarka, Tunisia	15,000	Clay	(Brazil) Rebeca Pereira	(Czech Republic) Kristyna Hrabalová (Poland) Joanna Zawadzka	6–7^{(4)}, 7–6^{(7)}, [9–11]
Win	10–10	May 2019	ITF Tabarka, Tunisia	15,000	Clay	(Brazil) Rebeca Pereira	(Netherlands) Eva Vedder (Netherlands) Stéphanie Visscher	6–3, 1–6, [10–5]
Loss	10–11	Jun 2019	ITF Tabarka, Tunisia	15,000	Clay	(Brazil) Rebeca Pereira	(South Africa) Natasha Fourouclas (Slovakia) Ingrid Vojčináková	6–3, 4–6, [8–10]
Win	11–11	Jun 2019	ITF Périgueux, France	25,000	Clay	(Brazil) Rebeca Pereira	(Colombia) María Herazo González (Latvia) Diāna Marcinkeviča	6–4, 6–2
Loss	11–12	Jul 2019	ITF Denain, France	25,000	Clay	(Brazil) Rebeca Pereira	(Russia) Daria Mishina (China) Xu Shilin	0–6, 5–7
Win	12–12	Sep 2019	ITF São Paulo, Brazil	15,000	Clay	(Brazil) Rebeca Pereira	(Argentina) Eugenia Ganga (Brazil) Thaisa Pedretti	6–2, 6–4
Loss	12–13	Oct 2020	ITF Monastir, Tunisia	15,000	Clay	(Brazil) Rebeca Pereira	(Spain) Yvonne Cavallé Reimers (Belgium) Eliessa Vanlangendonck	4–6, 6–7^{(3)}
Win	13–13	Oct 2020	ITF Monastir, Tunisia	15,000	Clay	(Brazil) Rebeca Pereira	(Poland) Weronika Falkowska (Germany) Lisa Ponomar	3–6, 7–6^{(3)}, [17–15]
Loss	13–14	Nov 2020	ITF Las Palmas, Spain	15,000	Clay	(Brazil) Rebeca Pereira	(Venezuela) Andrea Gámiz (Argentina) Guillermina Naya	6–3, 5–7, [7–10]
Loss	13–15	Dec 2020	ITF Madrid, Spain	15,000	Clay	(Brazil) Rebeca Pereira	(Spain) Ángela Fita Boluda (Russia) Oksana Selekhmeteva	6–7^{(4)}, 6–1, [5–10]
Loss	13–16	Apr 2021	ITF Córdoba, Argentina	25,000	Clay	(Brazil) Rebeca Pereira	(Russia) Amina Anshba (Hungary) Panna Udvardy	3–6, 3–6
Loss	13–17	Jul 2021	ITF Tarvisio, Italy	25,000	Clay	(Brazil) Rebeca Pereira	(Sweden) Caijsa Hennemann (Slovenia) Nika Radišić	4–6, 1–6
Loss	13–18	Jul 2021	ITS Cup, Czech Republic	60,000	Clay	(Brazil) Rebeca Pereira	(United States) Jessie Aney (Czech Republic) Anna Sisková	1–6, 0–6
Win	14–18	Jul 2021	Kozerki Open, Poland	60,000	Clay	(Brazil) Rebeca Pereira	(South Korea) Jang Su-jeong (Chinese Taipei) Lee Ya-hsuan	6–3, 6–1
Loss	14–19	Oct 2021	ITF Rio do Sul, Brazil	25,000	Clay	(Brazil) Rebeca Pereira	(Germany) Katharina Gerlach (Chile) Daniela Seguel	6–7^{(8)}, 3–6
Win	15–19	Jan 2022	ITF Blumenau-Gaspar, Brazil	25,000	Clay	(Venezuela) Andrea Gámiz	(United States) Sofia Sewing (Netherlands) Eva Vedder	6–4, 6–1
Loss	15–20	Jan 2022	ITF Florianopolis, Brazil	25,000	Hard	(Brazil) Rebeca Pereira	(Venezuela) Andrea Gámiz (United States) Sofia Sewing	4–6, 1–6
Win	16–20	Feb 2022	ITF Tucumán, Argentina	25,000	Clay	(Brazil) Rebeca Pereira	(Venezuela) Andrea Gámiz (Argentina) Paula Ormaechea	6–3, 7–5
Win	17–20	Mar 2022	ITF Salinas, Ecuador	25,000	Hard	(Brazil) Rebeca Pereira	(Colombia) María Herazo González (Colombia) María Paulina Pérez	6–4, 6–0
Win	18–20	May 2022	ITF Prague Open, Czech Republic	60,000	Clay	(Brazil) Rebeca Pereira	(Czech Republic) Jesika Malečková (Czech Republic) Miriam Kolodziejová	6–4, 6–2
Win	19–20	Oct 2026	ITF Maceió, Brazil	W15	Clay (i)	(Brazil) Rebeca Pereira	(Argentina) Lourdes Ayala (Ecuador) Camila Romero	6–4, 6–0
Win	20–20	Nov 2026	ITF São Carlos, Brazil	W15	Clay	(Brazil) Rebeca Pereira	(Brazil) Sabrina Dias (Brazil) Letícia Garcia Vidal	6–2, 6–0
