= Ivania Martinich =

Chilean tennis player

- Full name: Ivania Martinich Soriano
- Country (sports): Chile
- Residence: Viña del Mar, Chile
- Born: 25 July 1995 (age 29); Punta Arenas, Chile
- Plays: Right-handed (one-handed backhand)
- Prize money: $30,013

Singles
- Career record: 129–133
- Career titles: 0
- Highest ranking: No. 692 (4 November 2013)

Doubles
- Career record: 42–67
- Career titles: 0
- Highest ranking: No. 824 (12 September 2022)

Team competitions
- Fed Cup: 1–1

Ivania Martinich Soriano (born 25 July 1995) is a Chilean former tennis player.

Martinich has a career-high singles ranking of 692 by the WTA, achieved on 4 November 2013. She also has a career-high WTA doubles ranking of 824, achieved on 12 September 2022.

Playing for Chile Fed Cup team, Martinich has a win–loss record of 1–1.

== ITF finals ==
=== Singles (0–1) ===
Result	Date	Tournament	Surface	Opponent	Score
Loss	7 August 2016	Vinkovci, Croatia	Clay	(France) Tessah Andrianjafitrimo	4–6, 1–6

=== Doubles (0–1) ===
Result	Date	Tournament	Surface	Partner	Opponents	Score
Loss	28 April 2013	São Paulo, Brazil	Hard	(Argentina) Melina Ferrero	(Brazil) Raquel Piltcher (Brazil) Nathalia Rossi	3–6, 0–6
