= Fernanda Brito =

Chilean tennis player

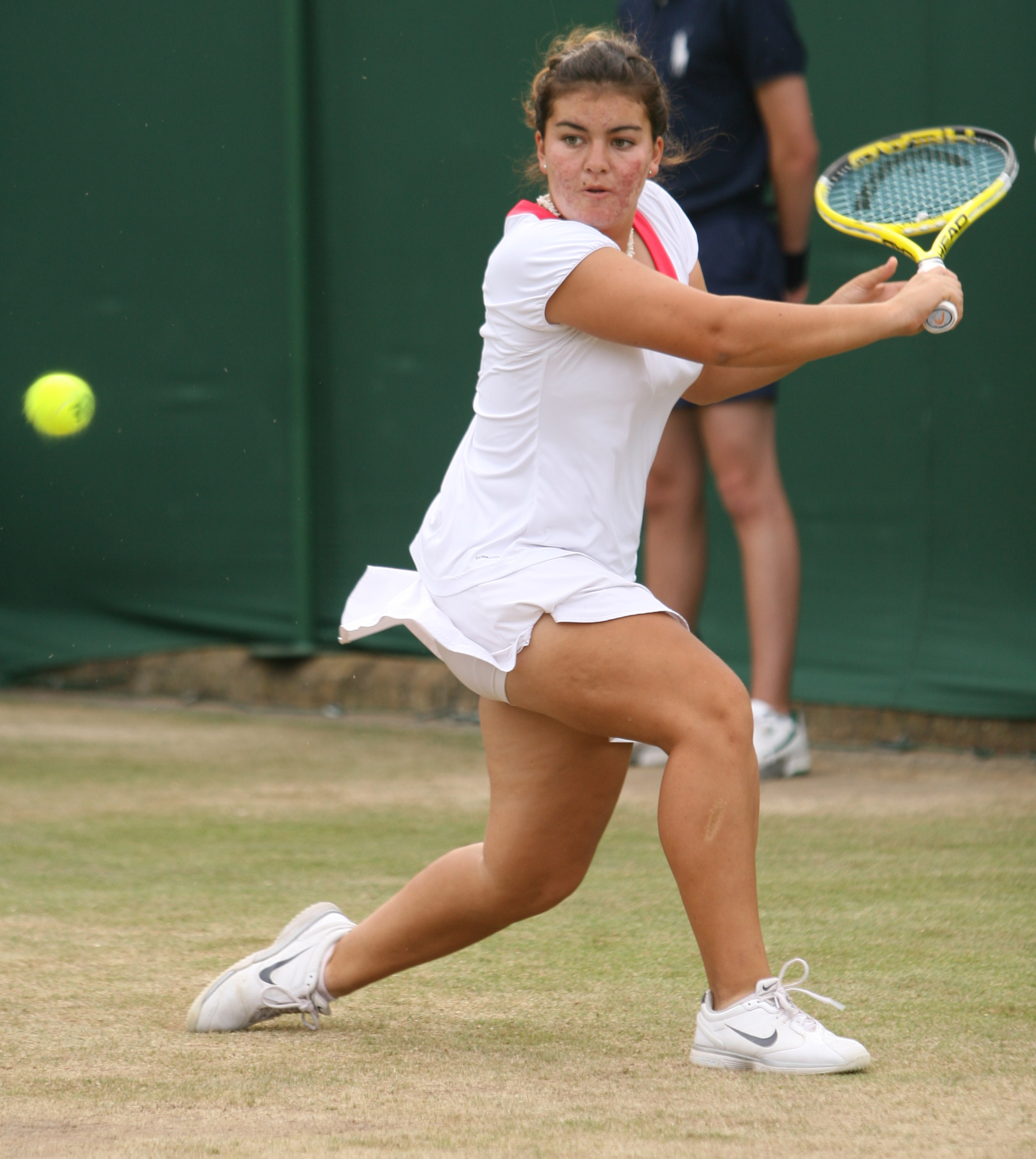
- Fernanda Brito at Wimbledon, 2010
- Country (sports): Chile
- Born: 14 February 1992 (age 34) Santiago, Chile
- Height: 1.72 m (5 ft 8 in)
- Plays: Right (two-handed backhand)
- Prize money: $147,963

Singles
- Career record: 409–145
- Career titles: 30 ITF
- Highest ranking: No. 274 (26 November 2018)

Doubles
- Career record: 290–118
- Career titles: 34 ITF
- Highest ranking: No. 380 (14 September 2015)

Team competitions
- Fed Cup: 5–14
Medal record
Representing Chile
Women's Tennis
South American Games
Bronze medal – third place	2018 Cochabamba	Singles

Fernanda Brito (Spanish pronunciation: [feɾˈnanda ˈβɾito]; (Note: In isolation, Brito is pronounced [ˈbɾito].) born 14 February 1992) is a Chilean former tennis player.

She had a career-high WTA rankings of 274 in singles and 380 in doubles. In her career, Brito won 30 singles titles and 34 doubles titles on tournaments of the ITF Circuit. Her last professional match was in November 2021.

She was a member of the Chile Fed Cup team since 2011.

In April 2024, Brito was issued with a six-month ban and fined $10,000 by the International Tennis Integrity Agency (ITIA) for "failure to co-operate with an investigation under the Tennis Anti-Corruption Program (TACP)".

== ITF Circuit finals ==
Legend
$25,000 tournaments
$15,000 tournaments
$10,000 tournaments

=== Singles: 53 (30 titles, 23 runner-ups) ===
Result	W–L	Date	Tournament	Tier	Surface	Opponent	Score
Loss	0–1	Oct 2010	ITF Santa Maria, Brazil	10,000	Clay	(Brazil) Roxane Vaisemberg	3–6, 2–6
Win	1–1	Nov 2011	ITF Concepción, Chile	10,000	Clay	(Argentina) Carla Lucero	6–3, 6–4
Loss	1–2	Jun 2012	ITF Santos, Brazil	10,000	Clay	(Brazil) Ana Clara Duarte	2–6, 6–3, 1–6
Loss	1–3	Aug 2012	ITF Trujillo, Peru	10,000	Clay	(Peru) Patricia Kú Flores	3–6, 7–6^{(7)}, 3–6
Win	2–3	Sep 2012	ITF Buenos Aires, Argentina	10,000	Clay	(Argentina) Vanesa Furlanetto	3–6, 7–6^{(5)}, 6–4
Win	3–3	Sep 2012	ITF Buenos Aires	10,000	Clay	(Argentina) Catalina Pella	6–3, 0–6, 7–5
Win	4–3	Oct 2012	ITF São Paulo, Brazil	10,000	Clay	(Argentina) Carolina Zeballos	1–6, 6–2, 6–4
Loss	4–4	Sep 2013	ITF Rosario, Argentina	10,000	Clay	(Argentina) Vanessa Furlanetto	2–6, 1–6
Loss	4–5	Mar 2014	ITF Santiago, Chile	10,000	Clay	(Brazil) Gabriela Cé	3–6, 5–7
Loss	4–6	Jun 2014	ITF Pachuca, Mexico	10,000	Hard	(Mexico) Carolina Betancourt	3–5 ret.
Win	5–6	Aug 2014	ITF Santa Fe, Argentina	10,000	Clay	(Argentina) Guadalupe Pérez Rojas	4–6, 6–4, 6–4
Win	6–6	Sep 2014	ITF Quito, Ecuador	10,000	Clay	(Brazil) Eduarda Piai	7–5, 0–6, 6–0
Loss	6–7	Oct 2014	ITF Lima, Peru	10,000	Clay	(Brazil) Nathaly Kurata	1–6, 1–6
Loss	6–8	Mar 2015	ITF Ribeirão Preto, Brazil	10,000	Clay	(Ukraine) Valeriya Strakhova	6–4, 5–7, 3–6
Win	7–8	Apr 2015	ITF Santiago, Chile	10,000	Clay	(Argentina) Nadia Podoroska	6–1, 6–0
Win	8–8	May 2015	ITF Villa del Dique, Argentina	10,000	Clay	(Argentina) Guadalupe Pérez Rojas	7–5, 6–3
Win	9–8	May 2015	ITF Villa María, Argentina	10,000	Clay	(Argentina) Julieta Lara Estable	6–3, 4–6, 7–6^{(2)}
Loss	9–9	Jun 2015	ITF Manzanillo, Mexico	10,000	Hard	(Mexico) Giuliana Olmos	6–4, 6–7^{(5)}, 0–6
Loss	9–10	Aug 2015	ITF Buenos Aires, Argentina	10,000	Clay	(Chile) Daniela Seguel	5–7, 1–6
Win	10–10	Oct 2015	ITF Santa Cruz, Bolivia	10,000	Clay	(Argentina) Melina Ferrero	6–2, 6–4
Loss	10–11	Mar 2016	ITF São José do Rio Preto, Brazil	10,000	Clay	(Brazil) Laura Pigossi	1–6, 5–7
Loss	10–12	Apr 2016	ITF Villa del Dique, Argentina	10,000	Clay	(United States) Elizabeth Halbauer	5–7, 2–6
Win	11–12	May 2016	ITF Villa María, Argentina	10,000	Clay	(United States) Elizabeth Halbauer	4–6, 6–3, 6–2
Loss	11–13	Aug 2016	ITF Medellin, Colombia	10,000	Clay	(France) Harmony Tan	2–6, 5–7
Loss	11–14	Sep 2016	ITF Hammamet, Tunisia	10,000	Clay	(Germany) Katharina Hobgarski	2–6, 2–6
Loss	11–15	Oct 2016	ITF Hammamet	10,000	Clay	(Germany) Katharina Hobgarski	0–6, 5–7
Win	12–15	Oct 2016	ITF Hammamet	10,000	Clay	(France) Marie Temin	6–3, 7–5
Win	13–15	Nov 2016	ITF Cúcuta, Colombia	10,000	Clay	(Colombia) María Herazo González	4–6, 6–4, 6–1
Loss	13–16	Dec 2016	ITF Santa Cruz, Bolivia	10,000	Clay	(Mexico) Victoria Rodríguez	4–6, 3–6
Loss	13–17	Apr 2017	ITF Hammamet, Tunisia	15,000	Clay	(Spain) Estrella Cabeza Candela	3–6, 5–7
Win	14–17	May 2017	ITF Pula, Italy	15,000	Clay	(Russia) Liudmila Samsonova	6–3, 6–3
Loss	14–18	Jun 2017	ITF Hammamet, Tunisia	15,000	Clay	(Australia) Seone Mendez	2–6, 1–6
Win	15–18	Jun 2017	ITF Hammamet	15,000	Clay	(Italy) Bianca Turati	6–0, 6–2
Win	16–18	Oct 2017	ITF Villa del Dique, Argentina	15,000	Clay	(Argentina) Stephanie Petit	6–3, 6–2
Win	17–18	Oct 2017	ITF Buenos Aires, Argentina	15,000	Clay	(Brazil) Thaísa Grana Pedretti	1–6, 7–5, 7–5
Loss	17–19	Oct 2017	ITF Lambaré, Paraguay	15,000	Clay	(Brazil) Thaísa Grana Pedretti	2–6, ret.
Loss	17–20	Nov 2017	ITF Asunción, Paraguay	15,000	Clay	(United Kingdom) Francesca Jones	3–6, 6–7^{(0)}
Loss	17–21	Dec 2017	ITF Santiago, Chile	15,000	Clay	(Russia) Anastasia Pivovarova	2–6, 6–4, 3–6
Win	18–21	Dec 2017	ITF Santa Cruz, Bolivia	15,000	Clay	(Mexico) Ana Sofía Sánchez	6–4, 6–3
Loss	18–22	Apr 2018	ITF Villa del Dique, Argentina	15,000	Clay	(Brazil) Thaísa Grana Pedretti	0–6, 4–6
Win	19–22	Jun 2018	ITF Hammamet, Tunisia	15,000	Clay	(Germany) Natalia Siedliska	6–2, ret.
Win	20–22	Jun 2018	ITF Hammamet	15,000	Clay	(Germany) Katharina Hobgarski	6–4, 6–2
Win	21–22	Jul 2018	ITF Hammamet	15,000	Clay	(Spain) Andrea Lázaro García	6–1, 6–0
Win	22–22	Aug 2018	ITF Guayaquil, Ecuador	15,000	Clay	(Brazil) Gabriela Cé	7–5, 6–4
Win	23–22	Aug 2018	ITF Guayaquil	15,000	Clay	(Chile) Bárbara Gatica	6–2, 6–2
Win	24–22	Aug 2018	ITF Lambaré, Paraguay	15,000	Clay	(Argentina) Jazmín Ortenzi	6–3, 1–6, 6–4
Win	25–22	Sep 2018	ITF Asunción, Paraguay	15,000	Clay	(Brazil) Gabriela Cé	6–3, 6–3
Win	26–22	Sep 2018	ITF Buenos Aires, Argentina	15,000	Clay	(Argentina) Catalina Pella	6–1, 6–4
Win	27–22	Nov 2018	ITF Villa del Dique, Argentina	15,000	Clay	(Argentina) Carla Lucero	6–3, 6–3
Win	28–22	Apr 2019	ITF Guayaquil, Ecuador	15,000	Clay	(Colombia) Yuliana Lizarazo	7–6^{(4)}, 4–6, 7–5
Win	29–22	Apr 2019	ITF Bucaramanga, Colombia	15,000	Clay	(Argentina) Carla Lucero	4–6, 6–3, 6–3
Loss	29–23	Aug 2019	ITF Lambaré, Paraguay	15,000	Clay	(Russia) Anna Morgina	6–3, 2–6, 2–6
Win	30–23	Oct 2019	ITF Santiago, Chile	15,000	Clay	(Argentina) Eugenia Ganga	6–2, 6–3

=== Doubles: 56 (34 titles, 22 runner-ups) ===
Result	No.	Date	Tournament	Surface	Partner	Opponents	Score
Win	1.	Nov 2009	ITF La Serena, Chile	Clay	(Paraguay) Verónica Cepede	(Chile) Andrea Koch Benvenuto (Chile) Giannina Minieri	4–6, 6–0, [10–6]
Loss	1.	Oct 2010	ITF Bogotá, Colombia	Clay	(Chile) Daniela Seguel	(Chile) Andrea Koch Benvenuto (Colombia) Karen Castiblanco	6–1, 3–6, 4–6
Win	2.	Nov 2010	ITF Concepción, Chile	Clay	(Chile) Daniela Seguel	(Colombia) Karen Castiblanco (Chile) Camila Silva	6–2, 6–3
Loss	2.	Feb 2011	ITF Buenos Aires, Argentina	Clay	(Argentina) Catalina Pella	(Paraguay) Veronica Cepede (Argentina) Luciana Sarmenti	0–6, 3–6
Loss	3.	Mar 2012	ITF Rancagua, Chile	Clay	(Brazil) Raquel Piltcher	(Peru) Patricia Kú Flores (Chile) Daniela Seguel	7–6^{(2)}, 7–5
Win	3.	Apr 2012	ITF Ribeirao Preto, Brazil	Hard	(Brazil) Raquel Piltcher	(Brazil) Gabriela Cé (Brazil) Carla Forte	6–3, 5–7, [10–7]
Loss	4.	Aug 2012	ITF Arequipa, Peru	Clay	(Brazil) Raquel Piltcher	(Brazil) Eduarda Piai (Brazil) Karina Vendetti	1–6, 2–6
Win	4.	Sep 2012	ITF Buenos Aires, Argentina	Clay	(Chile) Daniela Seguel	(Argentina) Sofía Luini (Argentina) Guadalupe Pérez Rojas	6–1, 6–3
Win	5.	Oct 2012	ITF São Paulo, Brazil	Clay	(Argentina) Guadalupe Pérez Rojas	(Brazil) Flávia Dechandt Araújo (Argentina) Carolina Zeballos	4–6, 6–2, [10–5]
Loss	5.	Sep 2013	ITF Asunción, Paraguay	Clay	(Argentina) Victoria Bosio	(Argentina) Carla Bruzzesi Avella (Argentina) Carolina Zeballos	1–6, 3–6
Win	6.	Oct 2013	ITF Buenos Aires, Argentina	Clay	(Uruguay) Carolina de los Santos	(Argentina) Ana Victoria Gobbi Monllau (Argentina) Constanza Vega	7–6^{(3)}, 4–6, [10–6]
Loss	6.	Nov 2013	ITF Buenos Aires	Clay	(Uruguay) Carolina de los Santos	(Argentina) Sofía Luini (Argentina) Catalina Pella	4–6, 4–6
Loss	7.	Dec 2013	ITF São José dos Campos, Brazil	Clay	(Argentina) Stephanie Petit	(Brazil) Eduarda Piai (Argentina) Nadia Podoroska	6–7, 5–7
Loss	8.	Feb 2014	ITF Buenos Aires, Argentina	Clay	(Uruguay) Carolina de los Santos	(Russia) Yuliya Kalabina (Russia) Irina Khromacheva	3–6, 2–6
Win	7.	Mar 2014	ITF Santiago, Chile	Clay	(Chile) Camila Silva	(Argentina) Sofía Blanco (Argentina) Nadia Podoroska	1–6, 7–6^{(5)}, [10–7]
Loss	9.	Aug 2014	ITF Santa Fe, Argentina	Clay	(Chile) Camila Silva	(Argentina) Ana Victoria Gobbi Monllau (Argentina) Guadalupe Pérez Rojas	3–6, 2–6
Win	8.	Oct 2014	ITF Lima, Peru	Clay	(Brazil) Eduarda Piai	(Argentina) Victoria Bosio (Dominican Republic) Francesca Segarelli	4–6, 7–6^{(9)}, [10–6]
Win	9.	Oct 2014	ITF Lima	Clay	(Brazil) Eduarda Piai	(Colombia) María Paulina Pérez (Colombia) Paula Andrea Pérez	7–6^{(0)}, 6–4
Loss	10.	Dec 2014	ITF Santiago, Chile	Clay	(Brazil) Eduarda Piai	(United States) Lauren Albanese (United States) Alexa Guarachi	4–6, 1–6
Loss	11.	Apr 2015	ITF Santiago	Clay	(Brazil) Eduarda Piai	(Argentina) Guadalupe Pérez Rojas (Argentina) Nadia Podoroska	4–6, 4–6
Win	10.	Apr 2015	ITF Villa del Dique, Argentina	Clay	(Chile) Camila Giangreco Campiz	(Argentina) Ana Victoria Gobbi Monllau (Argentina) Constanza Vega	6–3, 6–7^{(4)}, [10–6]
Win	11.	Jul 2015	ITF Buenos Aires, Argentina	Clay	(Chile) Daniela Seguel	(Brazil) Nathaly Kurata (Brazil) Eduarda Piai	6–2, 6–2
Win	12.	Aug 2015	ITF Buenos Aires	Clay	(Chile) Daniela Seguel	(Brazil) Nathaly Kurata (Brazil) Eduarda Piai	6–3, 6–2
Win	13.	Apr 2016	ITF São José do Rio Preto, Brazil	Clay	(Argentina) Constanza Vega	(Brazil) Carolina Alves (Argentina) Julieta Estable	2–6, 6–4, [10–6]
Win	14.	Apr 2016	ITF Villa del Dique, Argentina	Clay	(Paraguay) Camila Giangreco Campiz	(Brazil) Nathaly Kurata (Brazil) Eduarda Piai	6–3, 7–5
Win	15.	Aug 2016	ITF Medellín, Colombia	Clay	(Paraguay) Camila Giangreco Campiz	(Colombia) María Herazo González (Argentina) Carla Lucero	6–4, 6–2
Win	16.	Aug 2016	ITF Cali, Colombia	Clay	(Paraguay) Camila Giangreco Campiz	(United Kingdom) Emily Appleton (Hungary) Naomi Totka	6–1, 6–4
Loss	12.	Oct 2016	ITF Hammamet, Tunisia	Clay	(Bolivia) Noelia Zeballos	(Brazil) Carolina Alves (Switzerland) Karin Kennel	2–6, 6–4, [9–11]
Loss	13.	Oct 2016	ITF Hammamet	Clay	(Bolivia) Noelia Zeballos	(France) Alice Bacquié (Austria) Pia König	4–6, 1–6
Win	17.	Oct 2016	ITF Pereira, Colombia	Clay	(Paraguay) Camila Giangreco Campiz	(Colombia) María Paulina Pérez (Colombia) Paula Andrea Pérez	6–1, 6–2
Loss	14.	Nov 2016	ITF Santiago, Chile	Clay	(Paraguay) Camila Giangreco Campiz	(Mexico) Victoria Rodríguez (Mexico) Ana Sofía Sánchez	5–7, 5–7
Win	18.	Dec 2016	ITF Santa Cruz, Bolivia	Clay	(Paraguay) Camila Giangreco Campiz	(Argentina) Victoria Bosio (Mexico) Victoria Rodríguez	6–2, 7–5
Loss	15.	Apr 2017	ITF Hammamet, Tunisia	Clay	(Italy) Gaia Sanesi	(Italy) Alice Balducci (Italy) Giorgia Marchetti	6–2, 3–6, [2–10]
Loss	16.	Apr 2017	ITF Hammamet	Clay	(Sweden) Fanny Östlund	(United Kingdom) Maia Lumsden (Hungary) Panna Udvardy	4–6, 7–5, [4–10]
Win	19.	May 2017	ITF Pula, Italy	Clay	(Bolivia) Noelia Zeballos	(Italy) Maria Masini (Germany) Lisa Ponomar	6–3, 0–6, [10–3]
Loss	17.	Jun 2017	ITF Hammamet, Tunisia	Clay	(Bolivia) Noelia Zeballos	(Chinese Taipei) Hsieh Shu-ying (Chinese Taipei) Wu Fang-hsien	7–5, 3–6, [9–11]
Win	20.	Jun 2017	ITF Hammamet	Clay	(Bolivia) Noelia Zeballos	(Spain) Lucía de la Puerta Uribe (Spain) Guiomar Maristany	6–1, 6–3
Win	21.	Oct 2017	ITF Villa del Dique, Argentina	Clay	(Paraguay) Camila Giangreco Campiz	(Ecuador) Mariana Correa (Brazil) Flávia Guimarães Bueno	6–3, 6–3
Win	22.	Oct 2017	ITF Buenos Aires, Argentina	Clay	(Paraguay) Camila Giangreco Campiz	(Chile) Bárbara Gatica (Argentina) Guillermina Naya	7–5, 0–6, [10–5]
Win	23.	Oct 2017	ITF Lambaré, Paraguay	Clay	(Paraguay) Camila Giangreco Campiz	(Brazil) Thaísa Grana Pedretti (Bolivia) Noelia Zeballos	w/o
Win	24.	Nov 2017	ITF Asunción, Paraguay	Clay	(Paraguay) Camila Giangreco Campiz	(Brazil) Thaísa Grana Pedretti (Brazil) Nathaly Kurata	7–6^{(7)}, 6–4
Loss	18.	Dec 2017	ITF Santa Cruz, Bolivia	Clay	(Paraguay) Camila Giangreco Campiz	(Argentina) Victoria Bosio (Argentina) Stephanie Petit	5–7, 6–2, [8–10]
Win	25.	Mar 2018	ITF Campinas, Brazil	Clay	(Paraguay) Camila Giangreco Campiz	(Paraguay) Lara Escauriza (Mexico) Marcela Zacarías	6–4, 4–6, [10–4]
Loss	19.	Apr 2018	ITF Villa del Dique, Argentina	Clay	(Peru) Dominique Schaefer	(Brazil) Nathaly Kurata (Brazil) Eduarda Piai	0–6, 4–6
Win	26.	Jun 2018	ITF Hammamet, Tunisia	Clay	(Argentina) Sofia Luini	(Spain) Claudia Hoste Ferrer (France) Elixane Lechemia	6–3, 6–2
Win	27.	Jun 2018	ITF Hammamet	Clay	(Argentina) Paula Barañano	(Spain) Irene Burillo (Spain) Claudia Hoste Ferrer	7–6^{(5)}, 6–4
Loss	20.	Jun 2018	ITF Hammamet	Clay	(Guatemala) Melissa Morales	(Spain) Irene Burillo (Spain) Andrea Lázaro García	4–6, 4–6
Win	28.	Aug 2018	ITF Guayaquil, Ecuador	Clay	(Argentina) Sofia Luini	(Chile) Bárbara Gatica (Brazil) Rebeca Pereira	6–1, 6–0
Win	29.	Aug 2018	ITF Guayaquil	Clay	(Argentina) Sofia Luini	(Argentina) Martina Capurro (Ecuador) Camila Romero	7–6^{(5)}, 6–3
Win	30.	Aug 2018	ITF Lambaré, Paraguay	Clay	(Paraguay) Camila Giangreco Campiz	(Chile) Bárbara Gatica (Brazil) Rebeca Pereira	6–4, 4–6, [10–3]
Win	31.	Sep 2018	ITF Asunción, Paraguay	Clay	(Paraguay) Camila Giangreco Campiz	(Brazil) Marcela Bueno (Russia) Anastasia Shaulskaya	6–0, 6–2
Win	32.	Sep 2018	ITF Buenos Aires, Argentina	Clay	(Paraguay) Camila Giangreco Campiz	(Argentina) Julieta Lara Estable (Argentina) Catalina Pella	7–5, 7–6
Loss	21.	Nov 2018	ITF Villa del Dique, Argentina	Clay	(Argentina) Carla Lucero	(Chile) Bárbara Gatica (Brazil) Rebeca Pereira	3–6, 3–6
Win	33.	Apr 2019	ITF Guayaquil, Ecuador	Clay	(Colombia) María Paulina Pérez	(United States) Mara Schmidt (Russia) Anastasia Shaulskaya	6–3, 7–6
Win	34.	Apr 2019	ITF Bucaramanga, Colombia	Clay	(Colombia) María Paulina Pérez	(Colombia) Yuliana Lizarazo (Colombia) Antonia Samudio	6–2, 6–2
Loss	22.	Aug 2019	ITF Lambaré, Paraguay	Clay	(Argentina) Sofia Luini	(Paraguay) Montserrat González (Bolivia) Noelia Zeballos	0–6, 4–6
