= Victoria Bosio =

Argentine tennis player

- Country (sports): Argentina
- Born: 3 October 1994 (age 31) Santa Fe, Argentina
- Prize money: $151,130

Singles
- Career record: 413–230
- Career titles: 9 ITF
- Highest ranking: No. 305 (18 May 2026)
- Current ranking: No. 347 (29 June 2026)

Doubles
- Career record: 201–126
- Career titles: 12 ITF
- Highest ranking: No. 284 (7 March 2022)

Team competitions
- Fed Cup: 4–5
- Last updated on: 6 July 2026.

Victoria Bosio (Spanish pronunciation: [biɣˈtoɾja ˈβosjo]; (Note: In isolation, Bosio is pronounced [ˈbosjo].) born 3 October 1994) is an Argentine tennis player. On 18 May 2026, she reached her best singles ranking of world No. 305. On 7 March 2022, she peaked at No. 284 in the WTA doubles rankings.

Bosio has won nine singles and 12 doubles titles on the ITF Women's Circuit.

Playing for Argentina Fed Cup team, Bosio has a win-loss record of 4–5.

== ITF Circuit finals ==
=== Singles: 31 (10 titles, 21 runner-ups) ===
Legend W60 tournaments W50 tournaments W25/35 tournaments W10/15 tournaments	Finals by surface Hard (3–5) Clay (7–15) Carpet (0–1)

Result	W–L	Date	Tournament	Tier	Surface	Opponent	Score
Loss	0–1	Apr 2012	ITF Villa del Dique, Argentina	W10	Clay	(Chile) Daniela Seguel	5–7, 1–6
Win	1–1	Mar 2014	ITF Ribeirão Preto, Brazil	W10	Clay	(Brazil) Gabriela Cé	6–0, 7–5
Loss	1–2	Jun 2014	ITF Campos do Jordão, Brazil	W15	Hard	(Brazil) Laura Pigossi	6–4, 1–6, 6–7^{(2)}
Win	2–2	Nov 2014	ITF Bogotá, Colombia	W10	Clay	(Chile) Andrea Koch Benvenuto	7–6^{(3)}, 6–1
Win	3–2	Dec 2014	ITF Bogotá, Colombia	W10	Hard	(United Kingdom) Anna Brogan	1–6, 6–0, 6–1
Loss	3–3	Jan 2015	ITF Saint-Martin, France (Guadeloupe)	W10	Hard	(United States) Usue Maitane Arconada	5–7, 6–3, 1–6
Loss	3–4	Mar 2015	ITF São José dos Campos, Brazil	W10	Clay	(Argentina) Nadia Podoroska	7–6^{(6)}, 6–7^{(2)}, 3–6
Loss	3–5	Nov 2015	ITF Caracas, Venezuela	W10	Hard	(Argentina) Catalina Pella	6–3, 4–6, 0–6
Loss	3–6	Nov 2015	ITF Pereira, Colombia	W10	Clay	(Brazil) Laura Pigossi	7–5, 0–6, 2–6
Win	4–6	Jun 2016	ITF Buenos Aires, Argentina	W10	Clay	(Argentina) Martina Capurro Taborda	6–0, 6–2
Loss	4–7	Jun 2016	ITF Oeiras, Portugal	W10	Clay	(Italy) Angelica Moratelli	4–6, 2–6
Loss	4–8	Jun 2016	ITF Cantanhede, Portugal	W10	Carpet	(Republic of Ireland) Sinéad Lohan	3–6, 5–7
Loss	4–9	Dec 2016	ITF La Paz, Bolivia	W10	Clay	(Mexico) Victoria Rodríguez	1–6, 6–7^{(5)}
Loss	4–10	Jun 2017	ITF Villa del Dique	W15	Clay	(United States) Quinn Gleason	7–6^{(2)}, 3–6, 2–6
Loss	4–11	Aug 2017	ITF Bucharest, Romania	W15	Clay	(Romania) Gabriela Talabă	5–7, 4–6
Loss	4–12	Mar 2018	ITF São José dos Campos	W15	Clay	(Argentina) María Carlé	5–7, 6–1, 2–6
Loss	4–13	Apr 2018	ITF Villa Dolores, Argentina	W15	Clay	(United Kingdom) Francesca Jones	6–4, 4–6, 2–6
Loss	4–14	Aug 2018	Warsaw Open, Poland	W25	Clay	(Ukraine) Olga Ianchuk	3–6, 6–4, 3–6
Loss	4–15	Aug 2019	ITF Santa Cruz, Bolivia	W15	Clay	(Argentina) Jazmín Ortenzi	3–6, 2–6
Loss	4–16	Nov 2019	Copa Santiago, Chile	W60	Clay	(Italy) Elisabetta Cocciaretto	3–6, 4–6
Loss	4–17	Oct 2024	ITF Trelew, Argentina	W15	Hard (i)	(Chile) Jimar Gerald Gonzalez	6–7^{(8)}, 4–6
Win	5–17	Oct 2024	ITF Trelew, Argentina	W15	Hard (i)	(Brazil) Sofia Mendonça	6–1, 6–0
Loss	5–18	Dec 2024	ITF Joinville, Brazil	W15	Clay (i)	(Australia) Kaylah McPhee	3–6, 4–6
Loss	5–19	May 2025	ITF Trelew, Argentina	W15	Hard (i)	(Argentina) Martina Capurro Taborda	6–3, 2–6, 1–6
Win	6–19	May 2025	ITF Trelew, Argentina	W15	Hard (i)	(Argentina) Martina Capurro Taborda	7–6^{(1)}, 6–4
Win	7–19	Nov 2025	ITF Neuquén, Argentina	W15	Clay	(Argentina) Justina González Daniele	7–5, 6–1
Win	8–19	Dec 2025	ITF Lima, Peru	W15	Clay	(Germany) Marie Vogt	7–6^{(5)}, 7–6^{(4)}
Loss	8–20	Jan 2026	ITF Buenos Aires, Argentina	W50	Clay	(Italy) Dalila Spiteri	6–7^{(5)}, 3–6
Win	9–20	Mar 2026	ITF Santiago, Chile	W15	Clay	(Chile) Fernanda Labraña	7–6^{(4)}, 4–6, 7–6^{(5)}
Loss	9–21	Jul 2026	ITF Pergamino, Argentina	W35	Clay	(Brazil) Carolina Alves	6–4, 3–6, 2–6
Win	10–21	Aug 2026	ITF Luján, Argentina	W15	Clay	(Argentina) María Florencia Urrutia	6–4, 4–6, 7–6^{(4)}

=== Doubles: 33 (12 titles, 21 runner-ups) ===
Legend W25 tournaments W10/15 tournaments	Finals by surface Hard (1–4) Clay (11–17)

Result	W–L	Date	Tournament	Tier	Surface	Partner	Opponents	Score
Win	1–0	Sep 2012	ITF Villa Allende, Argentina	W10	Clay	(Argentina) Catalina Pella	(Argentina) Andrea Benítez (Argentina) Luciana Sarmenti	7–6^{(6)}, 6–7^{(3)}, [10–7]
Win	2–0	Nov 2012	ITF Temuco, Chile	W10	Clay	(Chile) Daniela Seguel	(Japan) Sachie Ishizu (Guatemala) Daniela Schippers	6–4, 6–2
Loss	2–1	Apr 2013	ITF Villa Allende, Argentina	W10	Clay	(Argentina) Aranza Salut	(Paraguay) Sara Giménez (Paraguay) Montserrat González	4–6, 0–6
Loss	2–2	May 2013	ITF Villa María, Argentina	W10	Clay	(Argentina) Aranza Salut	(Mexico) Ana Sofía Sánchez (Chile) Camila Silva	1–6, 2–6
Loss	2–3	Jun 2013	ITF Quintana Roo, Mexico	W10	Hard	(Paraguay) Montserrat González	(United States) Macall Harkins (United States) Zoë Gwen Scandalis	4–6, 6–3, [6–10]
Win	3–3	Jul 2013	ITF São José dos Campos, Brazil	W10	Clay	(Guatemala) Daniela Schippers	(Brazil) Laura Pigossi (Argentina) Carolina Zeballos	7–5, 6–4
Loss	3–4	Sep 2013	ITF Asunción, Paraguay	W10	Clay	(Chile) Fernanda Brito	(Argentina) Carla Bruzzesi Avella (Argentina) Carolina Zeballos	1–6, 3–6
Loss	3–5	Jun 2014	ITF Campos do Jordão, Brazil	W15	Hard	(Brazil) Ana Clara Duarte	(Brazil) Laura Pigossi (Brazil) Nathália Rossi	4–6, 2–6
Loss	3–6	Oct 2014	ITF Lima, Peru	W10	Clay	(Dominican Republic) Francesca Segarelli	(Chile) Fernanda Brito (Brazil) Eduarda Piai	6–4, 6–7^{(9)}, [6–10]
Win	4–6	Oct 2014	ITF Pereira, Colombia	W10	Clay	(France) Brandy Mina	(Argentina) Ana Madcur (Brazil) Nathália Rossi	7–6^{(3)}, 6–4
Loss	4–7	Nov 2014	ITF Bogotá, Colombia	W10	Clay	(United States) Daniella Roldan	(United Kingdom) Anna Brogan (Colombia) María Herazo González	7–5, 4–6, [7–10]
Loss	4–8	Dec 2014	ITF Bogotá, Colombia	W10	Hard	(United States) Daniella Roldan	(Argentina) Melina Ferrero (Argentina) Carla Lucero	4–6, 6–3, [10–12]
Win	5–8	Mar 2015	ITF São José dos Campos, Brazil	W10	Clay	(Brazil) Carolina Alves	(Brazil) Gabriela Cé (Brazil) Laura Pigossi	7–6^{(3)}, 6–4
Loss	5–9	Jun 2016	ITF Oeiras, Portugal	W10	Clay	(Brazil) Carolina Alves	(Cambodia) Andrea Ka (France) Laëtitia Sarrazin	6–4, 5–7, [3–10]
Win	6–9	Dec 2016	ITF La Paz, Bolivia	W10	Clay	(Mexico) Victoria Rodríguez	(United States) Stephanie Nemtsova (Brazil) Thaisa Grana Pedretti	7–6^{(2)}, 6–4
Loss	6–10	Dec 2016	ITF Santa Cruz, Bolivia	W10	Clay	(Mexico) Victoria Rodríguez	(Chile) Fernanda Brito (Paraguay) Camila Giangreco Campiz	2–6, 5–7
Loss	6–11	Apr 2017	ITF São José dos Campos, Brazil	W15	Clay	(Argentina) Julieta Lara Estable	(Brazil) Gabriela Cé (Brazil) Thaisa Grana Pedretti	2–6, 5–7
Loss	6–12	Aug 2017	ITF Las Palmas, Spain	W15	Clay	(Japan) Kana Daniel	(Oman) Fatma Al-Nabhani (Spain) Arabela Fernández Rabener	6–2, 5–7, [5–10]
Loss	6–13	Sep 2017	ITF Hammamet, Tunisia	W15	Clay	(Colombia) María Fernanda Herazo	(Algeria) Inès Ibbou (Italy) Isabella Tcherkes Zade	1–6, 4–6
Win	7–13	Sep 2017	ITF Hammamet, Tunisia	W15	Clay	(Colombia) María Fernanda Herazo	(Belgium) Lara Salden (Belgium) Chelsea Vanhoutte	6–4, 6–3
Win	8–13	Dec 2017	ITF Santa Cruz, Bolivia	W15	Clay	(Argentina) Stephanie Mariel Petit	(Chile) Fernanda Brito (Paraguay) Camila Giangreco Campiz	7–5, 2–6, [10–8]
Loss	8–14	Apr 2018	ITF Villa Dolores, Argentina	W15	Clay	(Argentina) Julieta Lara Estable	(Chile) Bárbara Gatica (Brazil) Rebeca Pereira	2–6, 4–6
Loss	8–15	Oct 2019	ITF Cúcuta, Colombia	W25	Clay	(Colombia) Emiliana Arango	(Brazil) Carolina Alves (Mexico) Renata Zarazúa	1–6, ret.
Win	9–15	Jan 2021	ITF Antalya, Turkey	W15	Clay	(Brazil) Gabriela Ce	(Japan) Miyu Kato (Japan) Haine Ogata	6–4, 6–3
Loss	9–16	Apr 2021	ITF Villa Maria, Argentina	W25	Clay	(Argentina) María Lourdes Carlé	(Greece) Valentini Grammatikopoulou (Netherlands) Richèl Hogenkamp	2–6, 2–6
Win	10–16	May 2021	ITF Santa Margarida de Montbui, Spain	W15	Hard	(Lithuania) Justina Mikulskytė	(Spain) Celia Cerviño Ruiz (United Kingdom) Olivia Nicholls	4–6, 6–1, [10–7]
Loss	10–17	Jul 2021	Telavi Open, Georgia	W25	Clay	(Italy) Angelica Moratelli	(North Macedonia) Lina Gjorcheska (Ukraine) Valeriya Strakhova	6–4, 4–6, [5–10]
Loss	10–18	Jul 2021	Telavi Open, Georgia	W25	Clay	(Italy) Angelica Moratelli	(Netherlands) Eva Vedder (Netherlands) Stéphanie Visscher	6–3, 4–6, [11–13]
Loss	10–19	Aug 2021	ITF Pescara, Italy	W25	Clay	(Italy) Angelica Moratelli	(Romania) Cristina Dinu (Romania) Ioana Loredana Roșca	2–6, 7–5, [3–10]
Loss	10–20	Oct 2021	ITF Piracicaba, Brazil	W15	Clay	(Chile) Fernanda Astete	(United States) Sabastiani León (Germany) Luisa Meyer auf der Heide	2–6, 0–3 ret.
Win	11–20	Mar 2024	ITF São João da Boa Vista, Brazil	W15	Clay	(Portugal) Ana Filipa Santos	(Italy) Verena Meliss (Italy) Camilla Zanolini	6–2, 6–4
Win	12–20	May 2024	Galați, Romania	W15	Clay	(Romania) Patricia Maria Țig	(Romania) Alexandra Irina Anghel (Romania) Cristiana Todoni	7–5, 7–5
Loss	12–20	Jun 2024	Focșani, Romania	W15	Clay	(Romania) Patricia Maria Țig	(Czech Republic) Kateřina Mandelíková (Romania) Briana Szabó	6–7^{(3)}, 0–6
Loss	12–21	Oct 2024	ITF Trelew, Argentina	W15	Hard (i)	(Mexico) Marian Gómez Pezuela Cano	(Argentina) Luciana Moyano (Ecuador) Camila Romero	6–7^{(4)}, 3–6

== Fed Cup participation ==
=== Doubles ===
Edition	Stage	Date	Location	Against	Surface	Partner	Opponents	W/L	Score
2014 Fed Cup	WG PO	20 Apr 2014	Sochi, Russia	Russia	Clay (i)	(Argentina) Nadia Podoroska	(Russia) Valeria Solovyeva (Russia) Elena Vesnina	L	2–6, 1–6
