= 2024 São Paulo Torneio Internacional de Tênis Feminino =

Tennis tournament

- Date: 30 September–6 October 2024
- Edition: 1st
- Category: ITF Women's World Tennis Tour
- Prize money: $60,000
- Surface: Clay / Outdoor
- Location: Clube Paineiras do Morumby, São Paulo, Brazil

Champions

Women's singles
- (Brazil) Laura Pigossi

Women's doubles
- (Italy) Nicole Fossa Huergo (Kazakhstan) Zhibek Kulambayeva
- São Paulo Torneio Internacional de Tênis Feminino

The 2024 São Paulo Torneio Internacional de Tênis Feminino was a professional tennis tournament played on outdoor clay courts. It was the first edition of the tournament, which was part of the 2024 ITF Women's World Tennis Tour. It took place in São Paulo, Brazil, between 30 September and 6 October 2024.

== Champions ==
=== Singles ===
- (Brazil) Laura Pigossi def. (Italy) Beatrice Ricci 6–7^{(3–7)}, 6–3, 6–3

=== Doubles ===
- (Italy) Nicole Fossa Huergo / (Kazakhstan) Zhibek Kulambayeva def. (Greece) Eleni Christofi / (Italy) Aurora Zantedeschi 3–6, 6–2, [10–4]

== Singles main draw entrants ==
=== Seeds ===
Country	Player	Rank	Seed
ARG	Julia Riera	121	1
BRA	Laura Pigossi	144	2
ARG	Solana Sierra	152	3
ITA	Giorgia Pedone	190	4
FRA	Léolia Jeanjean	208	5
FRA	Kristina Mladenovic	211	6
UKR	Valeriya Strakhova	244	7
ESP	Irene Burillo Escorihuela	256	8

- Rankings are as of 23 September 2024.

=== Other entrants ===
The following players received wildcards into the singles main draw:

- (Brazil) Carolina Bohrer Martins
- (Brazil) Camilla Bossi
- (Brazil) Ana Candiotto
- (Brazil) Júlia Konishi Camargo Silva

The following players received entry from the qualifying draw:

- (Italy) Gloria Ceschi
- (Italy) Diletta Cherubini
- (Chile) Jimar Gerald Gonzalez
- (Chile) Fernanda Labraña
- (Italy) Sofia Rocchetti
- (Brazil) Leticia Garcia Vidal
- (Italy) Aurora Zantedeschi
- (Bolivia) Noelia Zeballos
