= 2024 São Paulo Torneio Internacional de Tênis Feminino – Women's singles =

Women's singles
- 2024 São Paulo Torneio Internacional de Tênis Feminino

Final
- Champion: (Brazil) Laura Pigossi
- Runner-up: (Italy) Beatrice Ricci
- Score: 6–7^{(3–7)}, 6–3, 6–3

Events
Singles	men	women
Doubles	men	women
- São Paulo Torneio Internacional de Tênis Feminino

This is the first edition of the tournament.

Laura Pigossi won the title, defeating Beatrice Ricci in the final; 6–7^{(3–7)}, 6–3, 6–3.

== Seeds ==
1. (Argentina) Julia Riera (semifinals)
2. (Brazil) Laura Pigossi (champion)
3. (Argentina) Solana Sierra (second round)
4. (Italy) Giorgia Pedone (quarterfinals)
5. (France) Léolia Jeanjean (first round)
6. (France) Kristina Mladenovic (second round)
7. (Ukraine) Valeriya Strakhova (first round)
8. (Spain) Irene Burillo Escorihuela (quarterfinals)

== Draw ==
Key

- Q = Qualifier
- WC = Wild card
- LL = Lucky loser
- Alt = Alternate
- ITF = ITF entry
- PR = Protected ranking
- SR = Special ranking
- SE = Special exempt
- JE = Junior exempt
- JR = Junior Accelerator Programme entrant
- CO = College Accelerator Programme entrant
- NG = Next Gen Accelerator Program entrant
- w/o = Walkover
- r = Retired
- d = Defaulted

=== Finals ===
Semifinals
1	(Argentina) Julia Riera	6	3	1
(Italy) Beatrice Ricci	3	6	6
Daria Lodikova	7	2	4
2	(Brazil) Laura Pigossi	5	6	6

Final
(Italy) Beatrice Ricci	7^{7}	3	3
2	(Brazil) Laura Pigossi	6^{3}	6	6

=== Top half ===
First round
1	(Argentina) J Riera	6	6
(Romania) MS Popa	1	3
WC	(Brazil) C Bossi	2	0
(Mexico) V Rodríguez	6	6
WC	(Brazil) A Candiotto	6	1	5
Q	(Italy) D Cherubini	2	6	7
Q	(Italy) S Rocchetti	7^{7}	3	7
7	(Ukraine) V Strakhova	6^{3}	6	5
3	(Argentina) S Sierra	7	6
Q	(Chile) J Gerald Gonzalez	5	2
(Italy) B Ricci	6	6
K Laskutova	4	2
(Italy) N Fossa Huergo	6	6
WC	(Brazil) C Bohrer Martins	3	0
(Kazakhstan) Z Kulambayeva	4	6	6
5	(France) L Jeanjean	6	1	3

Second round
1	(Argentina) J Riera	6	6
(Mexico) V Rodríguez	3	2
Q	(Italy) D Cherubini	6	4
Q	(Italy) S Rocchetti	4	2^{r}
3	(Argentina) S Sierra	6	3	6^{5}
(Italy) B Ricci	2	6	7^{7}
(Italy) N Fossa Huergo	6	7
(Kazakhstan) Z Kulambayeva	3	5

Quarterfinals
1	(Argentina) J Riera	7^{7}	7^{7}
Q	(Italy) D Cherubini	6^{1}	6^{2}
(Italy) B Ricci	7^{7}	7
(Italy) N Fossa Huergo	6^{4}	5

Semifinals
1	(Argentina) J Riera	6	3	1
(Italy) B Ricci	3	6	6

=== Bottom half ===
First round
6	(France) K Mladenovic	7	6
Q	(Chile) F Labraña	5	3
D Lodikova	6	4
(Mexico) AS Sánchez	2	1^{r}
Q	(Italy) A Zantedeschi	6	6
(Brazil) TG Pedretti	1	2
(Japan) Y Naito	2	2
4	(Italy) G Pedone	6	6
8	(Spain) I Burillo Escorihuela	6	6
Q	(Bolivia) N Zeballos	2	0
Q	(Brazil) L Garcia Vidal	7	4	2
Q	(Italy) G Ceschi	5	6	6
WC	(Brazil) J Konishi Camargo Silva	1	1
(Brazil) C Alves	6	6
(Argentina) J Estable	1	1
2	(Brazil) L Pigossi	6	6

Second round
6	(France) K Mladenovic	4	6	3
D Lodikova	6	4	6
Q	(Italy) A Zantedeschi	3	0
4	(Italy) G Pedone	6	6
8	(Spain) I Burillo Escorihuela	6	6
Q	(Italy) G Ceschi	3	2
(Brazil) C Alves	3	6	3
2	(Brazil) L Pigossi	6	2	6

Quarterfinals
D Lodikova	2	6	7
4	(Italy) G Pedone	6	4	5
8	(Spain) I Burillo Escorihuela	2	2
2	(Brazil) L Pigossi	6	6

Semifinals
D Lodikova	7	2	4
2	(Brazil) L Pigossi	5	6	6
