= 2024 MundoTenis Open – Doubles =

Doubles
- 2024 MundoTenis Open

Final
- Champions: (Poland) Maja Chwalińska (Brazil) Laura Pigossi
- Runners-up: (Italy) Nicole Fossa Huergo (Ukraine) Valeriya Strakhova
- Score: 7–6^{(7–3)}, 6–3

Details
- Draw: 16
- Seeds: 4

Events
| Singles | Doubles |
- MundoTenis Open

Maja Chwalińska and Laura Pigossi won the title, defeating Nicole Fossa Huergo and Valeriya Strakhova 7–6^{(7–3)}, 6–3 in the final. Although this tournament was played on outdoor clay courts, the doubles final was played in an indoor clay court due to rain. Pigossi was the first Brazilian to win a trophy in this tournament. Chwalińska was the first player to win both singles and doubles in the tournament's history.

Sara Errani and Léolia Jeanjean were the reigning champions, but Errani did not participate this year. Jeanjean partnered Ekaterine Gorgodze, but lost in the quarterfinals to Ingrid Martins and Despina Papamichail.

== Seeds ==
1. (United States) Jessie Aney / Amina Anshba (semifinals)
2. (Brazil) Ingrid Martins / (Greece) Despina Papamichail (semifinals)
3. (Italy) Nicole Fossa Huergo / (Ukraine) Valeriya Strakhova (final)
4. (Egypt) Mayar Sherif / (Serbia) Nina Stojanović (first round)

== Draw ==
Key

- Q = Qualifier
- WC = Wild card
- LL = Lucky loser
- Alt = Alternate
- ITF = ITF entry
- PR = Protected ranking
- SR = Special ranking
- SE = Special exempt
- JE = Junior exempt
- JR = Junior Accelerator Programme entrant
- CO = College Accelerator Programme entrant
- NG = Next Gen Accelerator Program entrant
- w/o = Walkover
- r = Retired
- d = Defaulted

=== Draw ===
First round
1 | (United States) J Aney; A Anshba | 6 | 6
Alt | (Brazil) C Bohrer Martins (Chile) A Vergara Rivera | 2 | 3
(Peru) R Ccuno (Brazil) R Pereira | 0 | 7^{7} | [9]
(Greece) E Christofi (United States) C Rosca | 6 | 6^{5} | [11]
3 | (Italy) N Fossa Huergo (Ukraine) V Strakhova | 7^{7} | 3 | [10]
(Spain) Á Fita Boluda (Switzerland) Y In-Albon | 6^{5} | 6 | [8]
(Finland) A Kulikova; M Tkacheva | 5 | 1
A Ibragimova; E Makarova | 7 | 6
WC | (Brazil) A Candiotto (Brazil) L Fullana | 6^{2} | 1
(Romania) G Crăciun; I Shymanovich | 7^{7} | 6
(Poland) M Chwalińska (Brazil) L Pigossi | 5 | 6 | [10]
4 | (Egypt) M Sherif (Serbia) N Stojanović | 7 | 1 | [6]
(Argentina) M Capurro Taborda (Argentina) J Riera
(Georgia (country)) E Gorgodze (France) L Jeanjean | w/o
(Argentina) J Estable; D Lodikova | 7^{7} | 2 | [8]
2 | (Brazil) I Martins (Greece) D Papamichail | 6^{5} | 6 | [10]

Quarterfinals
1 | (United States) J Aney; A Anshba | 2 | 7^{8} | [10]
(Greece) E Christofi (United States) C Rosca | 6 | 6^{6} | [5]
3 | (Italy) N Fossa Huergo (Ukraine) V Strakhova | 7 | 5 | [10]
A Ibragimova; E Makarova | 5 | 7 | [3]
(Romania) G Crăciun; I Shymanovich | 2 | 4
(Poland) M Chwalińska (Brazil) L Pigossi | 6 | 6
(Georgia (country)) E Gorgodze (France) L Jeanjean | 2 | 2
2 | (Brazil) I Martins (Greece) D Papamichail | 6 | 6

Semifinals
1 | (United States) J Aney; A Anshba | 4 | 6 | [12]
3 | (Italy) N Fossa Huergo (Ukraine) V Strakhova | 6 | 0 | [14]
(Poland) M Chwalińska (Brazil) L Pigossi | 6 | 6
2 | (Brazil) I Martins (Greece) D Papamichail | 3 | 3

Final
3 | (Italy) N Fossa Huergo (Ukraine) V Strakhova | 6^{3} | 3
(Poland) M Chwalińska (Brazil) L Pigossi | 7^{7} | 6
