= 2024 MundoTenis Open =

- Date: 2 – 8 December
- Edition: 2nd
- Category: WTA 125
- Draw: 32S / 16D
- Prize money: $115,000
- Surface: Clay
- Location: Florianópolis, Brazil
- Venue: Super9 Tennis Park, Jurerê Internacional

Champions

Singles
- (Poland) Maja Chwalińska

Doubles
- (Poland) Maja Chwalińska / (Brazil) Laura Pigossi
- MundoTenis Open

The 2024 MundoTênis Open was a professional women's tennis tournament played on outdoor clay courts. It was the second edition of the tournament and part of the 2024 WTA 125 tournaments. It took place in Florianópolis, Brazil from 2 to 8 December 2024.

Although this tournament is played on outdoor clay courts, the doubles final of this edition was played on an indoor clay court due to rain. Laura Pigossi, winner of the doubles title in this edition, was the first Brazilian to win a trophy in this tournament. Polish Maja Chwalińska, winner of singles and doubles in this edition, was the first to win both trophies and also to do so in the same edition.

Champions

Maja Chwalińska (singles and doubles)	Laura Pigossi (doubles)

== Singles main draw entrants ==
=== Seeds ===
Country	Player	Rank^{1}	Seed
ARG	María Lourdes Carlé	81	1
EGY	Mayar Sherif	93	2
ARG	Julia Riera	112	3
LAT	Darja Semeņistaja	121	4
BRA	Laura Pigossi	129	5
HUN	Panna Udvardy	159	6
POL	Maja Chwalińska	161	7
FRA	Léolia Jeanjean	171	8

- Rankings are as of 25 November 2024.

=== Other entrants ===
The following players received wildcards into the singles main draw:

- (Brazil) Ana Candiotto
- (Argentina) Martina Capurro Taborda
- (Brazil) Luiza Fullana
- (Chile) Antonia Vergara Rivera

The following player received entry using a protected ranking:

- (Serbia) Nina Stojanović

The following players received entry from the qualifying draw:

- Alevtina Ibragimova
- (Switzerland) Ylena In-Albon
- (Finland) Anastasia Kulikova
- Mariia Tkacheva

== Doubles main draw entrants ==
=== Seeds ===
Country	Player	Country	Player	Rank^{1}	Seed
USA	Jessie Aney		Amina Anshba	239	1
BRA	Ingrid Martins	GRE	Despina Papamichail	243	2
ITA	Nicole Fossa Huergo	UKR	Valeriya Strakhova	298	3
EGY	Mayar Sherif	SRB	Nina Stojanović	335	4

- Rankings are as of November 25, 2024.

=== Other entrants ===
The following pair received a wildcard into the doubles main draw:

- (Brazil) Ana Candiotto / (Brazil) Luiza Fullana

The following pair received entry as alternates:

- (Brazil) Carolina Bohrer Martins / (Chile) Antonia Vergara Rivera

=== Withdrawals ===
- (Portugal) Francisca Jorge / (Spain) Guiomar Maristany → replaced by (Brazil) Carolina Bohrer Martins / (Chile) Antonia Vergara Rivera

== Champions ==
=== Singles ===
- (Poland) Maja Chwalińska def. (Switzerland) Ylena In-Albon 6–1, 6–2

=== Doubles ===
- (Poland) Maja Chwalińska / (Brazil) Laura Pigossi def. (Italy) Nicole Fossa Huergo / (Ukraine) Valeriya Strakhova 7–6^{(7–3)}, 6–3
