= 2024 MundoTenis Open – Singles =

Singles
- 2024 MundoTenis Open

Final
- Champion: (Poland) Maja Chwalińska
- Runner-up: (Switzerland) Ylena In-Albon
- Score: 6–1, 6–2

Details
- Draw: 32
- Seeds: 8

Events
Singles	Doubles
- MundoTenis Open

Maja Chwalińska won the title, defeating Ylena In-Albon 6–1, 6–2 in the final. It was Chwalińska's first WTA 125 singles title. Chwalińska was the first player to win singles and doubles in the tournament's history.

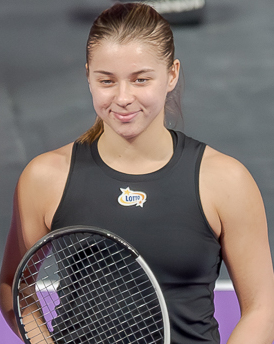
Singles champion Maja Chwalińska

Ajla Tomljanović was the reigning champion, but did not participate this year.

== Seeds ==
1. (Argentina) María Lourdes Carlé (semifinals)
2. (Egypt) Mayar Sherif (quarterfinals)
3. (Argentina) Julia Riera (first round)
4. (Latvia) Darja Semeņistaja (first round)
5. (Brazil) Laura Pigossi (second round)
6. (Hungary) Panna Udvardy (first round)
7. (Poland) Maja Chwalińska (champion)
8. (France) Léolia Jeanjean (semifinals)

== Draw ==
Key

- Q = Qualifier
- WC = Wild card
- LL = Lucky loser
- Alt = Alternate
- ITF = ITF entry
- PR = Protected ranking
- SR = Special ranking
- SE = Special exempt
- JE = Junior exempt
- JR = Junior Accelerator Programme entrant
- CO = College Accelerator Programme entrant
- NG = Next Gen Accelerator Program entrant
- w/o = Walkover
- r = Retired
- d = Defaulted

=== Finals ===
Semifinals
1	(Argentina) María Lourdes Carlé	6	6^{9}	2
Q	(Switzerland) Ylena In-Albon	3	7^{11}	6
8	(France) Léolia Jeanjean	0	3
7	(Poland) Maja Chwalińska	6	6

Final
Q	(Switzerland) Ylena In-Albon	1	2
7	(Poland) Maja Chwalińska	6	6

=== Top half ===
First round
1	(Argentina) ML Carlé	6	6
Q	M Tkacheva	1	0
(France) K Mladenovic	7^{7}	6^{6}	6
(Colombia) E Arango	6^{5}	7^{8}	1
WC	(Brazil) L Fullana	0	1
(Poland) K Kawa	6	6
Q	(Finland) A Kulikova	2	2
5	(Brazil) L Pigossi	6	6
4	(Latvia) D Semeņistaja	3	5
(Italy) N Fossa Huergo	6	7
(Greece) D Papamichail	6	4	6
WC	(Argentina) M Capurro Taborda	3	6	0
I Shymanovich	6	6
WC	(Chile) A Vergara Rivera	3	3
Q	(Switzerland) Y In-Albon	6	6
6	(Hungary) P Udvardy	4	1

Second round
1	(Argentina) ML Carlé	4	6	6
(France) K Mladenovic	6	2	1
(Poland) K Kawa	6	6
5	(Brazil) L Pigossi	3	2
(Italy) N Fossa Huergo	6	1	6
(Greece) D Papamichail	2	6	3
I Shymanovich	5	5
Q	(Switzerland) Y In-Albon	7	7

Quarterfinals
1	(Argentina) ML Carlé	6	6
(Poland) K Kawa	4	1
(Italy) N Fossa Huergo	3	1
Q	(Switzerland) Y In-Albon	6	6

Semifinals
1	(Argentina) ML Carlé	6	6^{9}	2
Q	(Switzerland) Y In-Albon	3	7^{11}	6

=== Bottom half ===
First round
8	(France) L Jeanjean	6	7^{7}
D Lodikova	1	6^{5}
PR	(Serbia) N Stojanović	6	6
WC	(Brazil) A Candiotto	2	1
(Ukraine) V Strakhova	4	6	6
(Romania) M Bulgaru	6	4	2
(Brazil) C Alves	7	6
3	(Argentina) J Riera	5	4
7	(Poland) M Chwalińska	7^{7}	6
(Spain) Á Fita Boluda	6^{3}	2
Q	A Ibragimova	4	0
(Ukraine) O Oliynykova	6	6
E Makarova	6	6^{5}	0^{r}
(Portugal) F Jorge	2	7^{7}	4
(Spain) G Maristany	3	5
2	(Egypt) M Sherif	6	7

Second round
8	(France) L Jeanjean	6	6
PR	(Serbia) N Stojanović	1	1
(Ukraine) V Strakhova	6	6
(Brazil) C Alves	3	4
7	(Poland) M Chwalińska	7^{7}	6
(Ukraine) O Oliynykova	6^{1}	1
(Portugal) F Jorge	1	3
2	(Egypt) M Sherif	6	6

Quarterfinals
8	(France) L Jeanjean	6	6
(Ukraine) V Strakhova	2	1
7	(Poland) M Chwalińska	6	4	6
2	(Egypt) M Sherif	3	6	1

Semifinals
8	(France) L Jeanjean	0	3
7	(Poland) M Chwalińska	6	6

== Qualifying ==
=== Seeds ===
1. Daria Lodikova (moved to main draw)
2. Alevtina Ibragimova (qualified)
3. (Switzerland) Ylena In-Albon (qualified)
4. (Finland) Anastasia Kulikova (qualified)

=== Qualifiers ===
1. Mariia Tkacheva
2. Alevtina Ibragimova
3. (Switzerland) Ylena In-Albon
4. (Finland) Anastasia Kulikova

=== Qualifying draw ===
==== First qualifier ====
Qualifying competition
Alt	Mariia Tkacheva	4	6	6
WC	(Brazil) Carolina Bohrer Martins	6	4	0

==== Second qualifier ====
Qualifying competition
2	Alevtina Ibragimova	6	6
	(Georgia (country)) Ekaterine Gorgodze	2	3

==== Third qualifier ====
Qualifying competition
3	(Switzerland) Ylena In-Albon	6	6
	(Argentina) Julieta Estable	2	2

==== Fourth qualifier ====
Qualifying competition
4	(Finland) Anastasia Kulikova	7	6
WC	(Brazil) Sofia da Cruz Mendonça	5	1
