= 2024 São Paulo Torneio Internacional de Tênis Feminino – Women's doubles =

Women's doubles
- 2024 São Paulo Torneio Internacional de Tênis Feminino

Final
- Champions: (Italy) Nicole Fossa Huergo (Kazakhstan) Zhibek Kulambayeva
- Runners-up: (Greece) Eleni Christofi (Italy) Aurora Zantedeschi
- Score: 3–6, 6–2, [10–4]

Events
Singles	men	women
Doubles	men	women
← 2023 ·	São Paulo Torneio Internacional de Tênis Feminino	· 2025 →

Thi is the first edition of the tournament.

Nicole Fossa Huergo and Zhibek Kulambayeva won the title, defeating Eleni Christofi and Aurora Zantedeschi in the final; 3–6, 6–2, [10–4].

== Seeds ==
1. (Greece) Eleni Christofi / (Italy) Aurora Zantedeschi (final)
2. (Italy) Nicole Fossa Huergo / (Kazakhstan) Zhibek Kulambayeva (champions)
3. (Japan) Yuki Naito / (Ukraine) Valeriya Strakhova (quarterfinals)
4. (Brazil) Laura Pigossi / (Argentina) Julia Riera (semifinals)

== Draw ==
=== Key ===
- Q = Qualifier
- WC = Wild card
- LL = Lucky loser
- Alt = Alternate
- ITF = ITF entry
- PR = Protected ranking
- SR = Special ranking
- SE = Special exempt
- JE = Junior exempt
- JR = Junior Accelerator Programme entrant
- CO = College Accelerator Programme entrant
- NG = Next Gen Accelerator Program entrant
- w/o = Walkover
- r = Retired
- d = Defaulted

First round
1	(Greece) E Christofi (Italy) A Zantedeschi	6	6
(Italy) G Ceschi (Romania) M Toma	2	2
(Italy) B Ricci (Italy) S Rocchetti	6	6
(Brazil) L Esteves (Brazil) L Rodrigues Daud	1	3
4	(Brazil) L Pigossi (Argentina) J Riera	6	6
Alt	(Brazil) JR Dourado (Brazil) Y Fatima Costa	1	1
(Peru) R Ccuno (Brazil) R Pereira	6	6
(Mexico) V Rodríguez (Mexico) AS Sánchez	3	4
(Brazil) TG Pedretti (Bolivia) N Zeballos	7	6
(Brazil) A Candiotto; D Lodikova	5	0
(Brazil) B Bernardes (Brazil) S Cohen Perovani	2	0
3	(Japan) Y Naito (Ukraine) V Strakhova	6	6
WC	(Brazil) C Bossi (Brazil) L Garcia Vidal	7	4	[10]
(Brazil) C Bohrer Martins (Brazil) J Konishi Camargo Silva	5	6	[6]
(Argentina) J Estable (Chile) F Labraña	1	1
2	(Italy) N Fossa Huergo (Kazakhstan) Z Kulambayeva	6	6

Quarterfinals
1	(Greece) E Christofi (Italy) A Zantedeschi	w/o
(Italy) B Ricci (Italy) S Rocchetti
4	(Brazil) L Pigossi (Argentina) J Riera	6	6
(Peru) R Ccuno (Brazil) R Pereira	1	1
(Brazil) TG Pedretti (Bolivia) N Zeballos	7^{7}	5	[10]
3	(Japan) Y Naito (Ukraine) V Strakhova	6^{1}	7	[8]
WC	(Brazil) C Bossi (Brazil) L Garcia Vidal	2	2
2	(Italy) N Fossa Huergo (Kazakhstan) Z Kulambayeva	6	6

Semifinals
1	(Greece) E Christofi (Italy) A Zantedeschi	6	6
4	(Brazil) L Pigossi (Argentina) J Riera	2	2
(Brazil) TG Pedretti (Bolivia) N Zeballos	6^{1}	1
2	(Italy) N Fossa Huergo (Kazakhstan) Z Kulambayeva	7^{7}	6

Final
1	(Greece) E Christofi (Italy) A Zantedeschi	6	2	[4]
2	(Italy) N Fossa Huergo (Kazakhstan) Z Kulambayeva	3	6	[10]
