= 2026 Copa LP Chile =

- Date: 16–22 November
- Edition: 9th
- Category: WTA 125
- Prize money: $115,000
- Surface: Clay / Outdoor
- Location: Colina, Chile
- Venue: Hacienda Chicureo

Champions

Singles
- (Switzerland) Rebeka Masarova

Doubles
- (Slovenia) Veronika Erjavec / (Kazakhstan) Zhibek Kulambayeva
- Copa LP Chile

The 2026 Copa LP Chile, also known as LP Open by IND, for sponsorship reasons, was a professional women's tennis tournament played on outdoor clay courts. It was the ninth edition of the tournament which was also part of the 2026 WTA 125 season. It took place at the Hacienda Chicureo Club in Colina, Chile between 16 and 22 November 2026.

== Singles main-draw entrants ==
=== Seeds ===
Country	Player	Rank^{1}	Seed
ESP	Leyre Romero Gormaz	111	1
CZE	Laura Samson	119	2
ITA	Lucia Bronzetti	136	3
ESP	Andrea Lázaro García	143	4
ESP	Guiomar Maristany	145	5
SUI	Rebeka Masarova	160	6
SLO	Veronika Erjavec	161	7
LAT	Darja Semeņistaja	175	8

- ^{1} Rankings are as of 9 November 2026.

=== Other entrants ===
The following players received wildcards into the singles main draw:

- (Romania) Miriam Bulgaru
- (Chile) Bárbara Gatica
- (Chile) Fernanda Labraña
- (Chile) Antonia Vergara Rivera

The following players received entry from the qualifying draw:

- (Italy) Diletta Cherubini
- (Spain) Ariana Geerlings
- (Ukraine) Valeriya Strakhova
- (Italy) Martina Trevisan

=== Withdrawals ===
Before the tournament

- (Austria) Julia Grabher → replaced by (Italy) Nuria Brancaccio
- (United Kingdom) Francesca Jones → replaced by (Slovenia) Polona Hercog
- (Poland) Magda Linette → replaced by (Turkey) İpek Öz
- (Croatia) Petra Marčinko → replaced by (Andorra) Victoria Jiménez Kasintseva
- (Argentina) Jazmín Ortenzi → replaced by (United States) Katrina Scott
- (Argentina) Julia Riera → replaced by (Argentina) María Lourdes Carlé
- (Argentina) Solana Sierra → replaced by (Spain) Alicia Herrero Liñana
- (Slovenia) Tamara Zidanšek → replaced by (Spain) Irene Burillo

== Doubles entrants ==
=== Seeds ===
Country	Player	Country	Player	Rank^{1}	Seed
UKR	Valeriya Strakhova		Anastasia Tikhonova	175	1
SLO	Veronika Erjavec	KAZ	Zhibek Kulambayeva	246	2

- Rankings as of 9 November 2026.

=== Other entrants ===
The following pair received a wildcard into the doubles main draw:

- ~~(Chile) Fernanda Labraña / (Chile) Antonia Vergara Rivera~~

=== Withdrawals ===
- (Chile) Fernanda Labraña / (Chile) Antonia Vergara Rivera → replaced by (Andorra) Victoria Jiménez Kasintseva / (United States) Varvara Lepchenko

== Champions ==
=== Singles ===
- (Switzerland) Rebeka Masarova def. (Spain) Leyre Romero Gormaz, 6–4, 6–4

=== Doubles ===
- (Slovenia) Veronika Erjavec / (Kazakhstan) Zhibek Kulambayeva def. (Ukraine) Valeriya Strakhova / Anastasia Tikhonova 6–4, 6–3
