= 2026 Billie Jean King Cup Americas Zone =

Subsection of tennis competition

The Americas Zone is one of three zones of regional competition in the 2026 Billie Jean King Cup.

== Group I ==
- Date: 8–11 April 2026
- Venue: Club Deportivo de Ibagué, Ibagué, Colombia
- Surface: Clay

The eight teams were divided into two pools of four teams. The first and second-placed teams of each pool played against one another in head-to-head rounds and the winners advanced to the play-offs; while the third and fourth-placed teams played against one another in head-to-head rounds and the losers were relegated to Americas Zone Group II in 2027.

=== Participating teams ===
#: Nations Ranking as of 17 November 2025.

- Argentina (#24) (Julia Riera, Luisina Giovannini, Martina Capurro Taborda, Nicole Fossa Huergo, Carla Markus, Captain: Paola Suarez)
- Brazil (#20) (Gabriela Ce, Ana Candiotto, Nauhany Vitória Leme da Silva, Victoria Luiza Barros, Captain: Luiz Peniza)
- Chile (#29) (Antonia Vergara Rivera, Fernanda Labraña, Jimar Geraldine González, Camila Rodero, Captain: Paulina Sepúlveda)
- Colombia (#25) (Camila Osorio, Emiliana Arango, Valentina Mediorreal Arias, María Torres Murcia, María Paulina Pérez, Captain: Alejandro González)
- Ecuador (#49) (Mell Reasco, Camila Romero, Ana Paula Jativa, Camila Zabala, Captain: Doménica González)
- Mexico (#21) (Victoria Rodríguez, María Fernanda Navarro Oliva, Jessica Hinojosa, Marian Gomez, Captain: Agustín Moreno)
- Peru (#39) (Dana Guzman, Romina Ccuno, Yleymi Muelle, Leticia Bazan, Silvana Fajardo, Captain: Laura Arraya)
- Venezuela (#37) (Sofía Cabezas, Andrea Magallanes, Samantha Martinez, Bethania Bonaguro, Sandra Talamo Pinto, Captain: William Campos)

=== Pool A ===
| Pos. | Country | Ties W–L | Matches W–L | Sets W–L | Games W–L |
|---|---|---|---|---|---|
| 1 | Brazil | 3–0 | 8–1 | 16–4 | 104–65 |
| 2 | Argentina | 2–1 | 7–2 | 15–6 | 110–73 |
| 3 | Peru | 1–2 | 2–7 | 5–15 | 71–103 |
| 4 | Chile | 0–3 | 1–8 | 5–16 | 72–116 |

==== Brazil vs Chile ====
Brazil
3
Club Deportivo de Ibagué, Ibagué, Colombia
8 April 2026
Clay

Chile
0

| | | | 1 | 2 | 3 |
|---|---|---|---|---|---|
| 1 | (Brazil) (Chile) | Nauhany Vitória Leme da Silva; Fernanda Labraña | 3; 6 | 7^{7} 6^{3} | 6; 1 |
| 2 | (Brazil) (Chile) | Gabriela Cé; Antonia Vergara Rivera | 6; 0 | 6; 0 |
| 3 | (Brazil) (Chile) | Victoria Luiza Barros / Ana Candiotto; Jimar Geraldine González / Antonia Vergara Rivera | 6; 2 | 6; 4 |

==== Argentina vs Peru ====
Argentina
3
Club Deportivo de Ibagué, Ibagué, Colombia
8 April 2026
Clay

Peru
0

| | | | 1 | 2 | 3 |
|---|---|---|---|---|---|
| 1 | (Argentina) (Peru) | Luisina Giovannini; Yleymi Muelle | 6; 3 | 6; 0 |
| 2 | (Argentina) (Peru) | Julia Riera; Dana Guzman | 7; 5 | 7; 5 |
| 3 | (Argentina) (Peru) | Martina Capurro Taborda / Nicole Fossa Huergo; Romina Ccuno / Yleymi Muelle | 3; 6 | 6; 4 | 10; 7 |

==== Brazil vs Argentina ====
Brazil
2
Club Deportivo de Ibagué, Ibagué, Colombia
9 April 2026
Clay

Argentina
1

| | | | 1 | 2 | 3 |
|---|---|---|---|---|---|
| 1 | (Brazil) (Argentina) | Nauhany Vitória Leme da Silva; Luisina Giovannini | 7^{7} 6^{4} | 6; 4 |
| 2 | (Brazil) (Argentina) | Gabriela Cé; Julia Riera | 0; 6 | 3; 6 |
| 3 | (Brazil) (Argentina) | Victoria Luiza Barros / Nauhany Vitória Leme da Silva; Nicole Fossa Huergo / Julia Riera | 4; 6 | 7; 5 | 10; 5 |

==== Chile vs Peru ====
Chile
1
Club Deportivo de Ibagué, Ibagué, Colombia
9 April 2026
Clay

Peru
2

| | | | 1 | 2 | 3 |
|---|---|---|---|---|---|
| 1 | (Chile) (Peru) | Fernanda Labraña; Silvana Fajardo | 6; 4 | 6; 2 |
| 2 | (Chile) (Peru) | Antonia Vergara Rivera; Dana Guzman | 2; 6 | 6; 3 | 1; 6 |
| 3 | (Chile) (Peru) | Jimar Geraldine González / Fernanda Labraña; Romina Ccuno / Yleymi Muelle | 5; 7 | 5; 7 |

==== Brazil vs Peru ====
Brazil
3
Club Deportivo de Ibagué, Ibagué, Colombia
10 April 2026
Clay

Peru
0

| | | | 1 | 2 | 3 |
|---|---|---|---|---|---|
| 1 | (Brazil) (Peru) | Victoria Luiza Barros; Leticia Bazan | 6; 3 | 6; 3 |
| 2 | (Brazil) (Peru) | Gabriela Cé; Yleymi Muelle | 6; 0 | 6; 2 |
| 3 | (Brazil) (Peru) | Victoria Luiza Barros / Ana Candiotto; Romina Ccuno / Dana Guzman | 6; 4 | 6; 1 |

==== Argentina vs Chile ====
Argentina
3
Club Deportivo de Ibagué, Ibagué, Colombia
10 April 2026
Clay

Chile
0

| | | | 1 | 2 | 3 |
|---|---|---|---|---|---|
| 1 | (Argentina) (Chile) | Luisina Giovannini; Fernanda Labraña | 6; 2 | 4; 6 | 6; 4 |
| 2 | (Argentina) (Chile) | Julia Riera; Antonia Vergara Rivera | 6; 0 | 6; 3 |
| 3 | (Argentina) (Chile) | Nicole Fossa Huergo / Carla Markus; Jimar Geraldine González / Camila Rodero | 7^{8} 6^{6} | 6; 1 |

=== Pool B ===
| Pos. | Country | Ties W–L | Matches W–L | Sets W–L | Games W–L |
|---|---|---|---|---|---|
| 1 | Ecuador | 2–1 | 6–3 | 13–7 | 91–78 |
| 2 | Mexico | 2–1 | 6–3 | 13–7 | 103–73 |
| 3 | Colombia | 2–1 | 6–3 | 14–8 | 102–66 |
| 4 | Venezuela | 0–3 | 0–9 | 0–18 | 30–109 |

==== Mexico vs Venezuela ====
Mexico
3
Club Deportivo de Ibagué, Ibagué, Colombia
8 April 2026
Clay

Venezuela
0

| | | | 1 | 2 | 3 |
|---|---|---|---|---|---|
| 1 | (Mexico) (Venezuela) | Jessica Hinojosa; Sandra Talamo Pinto | 6; 0 | 6; 1 |
| 2 | (Mexico) (Venezuela) | Victoria Rodríguez; Samantha Martinez | 6; 4 | 6; 3 |
| 3 | (Mexico) (Venezuela) | Marian Gomez / Jessica Hinojosa; Bethania Bonaguro / Andrea Magallanes | 6; 4 | 7; 5 |

==== Colombia vs Ecuador ====
Colombia
2
Club Deportivo de Ibagué, Ibagué, Colombia
8 April 2026
Clay

Ecuador
1

| | | | 1 | 2 | 3 |
|---|---|---|---|---|---|
| 1 | (Colombia) (Ecuador) | Valentina Mediorreal Arias; Camila Romero | 6^{4} 7^{7} | 6; 1 | 6; 4 |
| 2 | (Colombia) (Ecuador) | Emiliana Arango; Mell Reasco | 6; 0 | 6; 1 |
| 3 | (Colombia) (Ecuador) | María Paulina Pérez / María Torres Murcia; Mell Reasco / Camila Romero | 2; 6 | 7^{7} 6^{2} | 5; 10 |

==== Mexico vs Colombia ====
Mexico
2
Club Deportivo de Ibagué, Ibagué, Colombia
9 April 2026
Clay

Colombia
1

| | | | 1 | 2 | 3 |
|---|---|---|---|---|---|
| 1 | (Mexico) (Colombia) | Jessica Hinojosa; Valentina Mediorreal Arias | 6; 1 | 2; 6 | 6; 3 |
| 2 | (Mexico) (Colombia) | Victoria Rodríguez; Emiliana Arango | 6; 4 | 6; 4 |
| 3 | (Mexico) (Colombia) | María Fernanda Navarro Oliva / Victoria Rodríguez; Emiliana Arango / María Paulina Pérez | 4; 6 | 6; 2 | 1; 10 |

==== Venezuela vs Ecuador ====
Venezuela
0
Club Deportivo de Ibagué, Ibagué, Colombia
9 April 2026
Clay

Ecuador
3

| | | | 1 | 2 | 3 |
|---|---|---|---|---|---|
| 1 | (Venezuela) (Ecuador) | Samantha Martinez; Camila Romero | 3; 6 | 0; 6 |
| 2 | (Venezuela) (Ecuador) | Andrea Magallanes; Mell Reasco | 1; 6 | 3; 6 |
| 3 | (Venezuela) (Ecuador) | Bethania Bonaguro / Sandra Talamo Pinto; Mell Reasco / Camila Romero | 2; 6 | 0; 6 |

==== Mexico vs Ecuador ====
Mexico
1
Club Deportivo de Ibagué, Ibagué, Colombia
10 April 2026
Clay

Ecuador
2

| | | | 1 | 2 | 3 |
|---|---|---|---|---|---|
| 1 | (Mexico) (Ecuador) | Jessica Hinojosa; Camila Romero | 6; 2 | 6; 1 |
| 2 | (Mexico) (Ecuador) | Victoria Rodríguez; Mell Reasco | 3; 6 | 4; 6 |
| 3 | (Mexico) (Ecuador) | Marian Gomez / Jessica Hinojosa; Mell Reasco / Camila Romero | 5; 7 | 6^{4} 7^{7} |

==== Colombia vs Venezuela ====
Colombia
3
Club Deportivo de Ibagué, Ibagué, Colombia
10 April 2026
Clay

Venezuela
0

| | | | 1 | 2 | 3 |
|---|---|---|---|---|---|
| 1 | (Colombia) (Venezuela) | Valentina Mediorreal Arias; Bethania Bonaguro | 6; 1 | 6; 0 |
| 2 | (Colombia) (Venezuela) | Emiliana Arango; Andrea Magallanes | 6; 1 | 6; 0 |
| 3 | (Colombia) (Venezuela) | Emiliana Arango / Valentina Mediorreal Arias; Samantha Martinez / Sandra Talamo Pinto | 6; 1 | 6; 1 |

=== Promotion play-offs ===
==== Brazil vs Mexico ====
Brazil
2
Club Deportivo de Ibagué, Ibagué, Colombia
11 April 2026
Clay

Mexico
0

| | | | 1 | 2 | 3 |
|---|---|---|---|---|---|---|
| 1 | (Brazil) (Mexico) | Nauhany Vitória Leme da Silva; Jessica Hinojosa | 6; 1 | 6; 0 |
| 2 | (Brazil) (Mexico) | Gabriela Ce; Victoria Rodríguez | 4; 6 | 6; 3 | 6; 4 |
| 3 | (Brazil) (Mexico) | Victoria Luiza Barros / Ana Candiotto; Jessica Hinojosa / Victoria Rodríguez | | | | not played |

==== Ecuador vs Argentina ====
Ecuador
0
Club Deportivo de Ibagué, Ibagué, Colombia
11 April 2026
Clay

Argentina
2

| | | | 1 | 2 | 3 |
|---|---|---|---|---|---|---|
| 1 | (Ecuador) (Argentina) | Camila Romero; Martina Capurro Taborda | 4; 6 | 3; 6 |
| 2 | (Ecuador) (Argentina) | Mell Reasco; Julia Riera | 0; 6 | 1; 6 |
| 3 | (Ecuador) (Argentina) | Mell Reasco / Camila Romero; Nicole Fossa Huergo / Luisina Giovannini | | | | not played |

=== Relegation play-offs ===
==== Peru vs Venezuela ====
Peru
2
Club Deportivo de Ibagué, Ibagué, Colombia
11 April 2026
Clay

Venezuela
0

| | | | 1 | 2 | 3 |
|---|---|---|---|---|---|---|
| 1 | (Peru) (Venezuela) | Silvana Fajardo; Samantha Martinez | 6; 2 | 6; 3 |
| 2 | (Peru) (Venezuela) | Dana Guzman; Andrea Magallanes | 6; 2 | 6; 0 |
| 3 | (Peru) (Venezuela) | Romina Ccuno / Yleymi Muelle; Bethania Bonaguro / Sandra Talamo Pinto | | | | not played |

==== Colombia vs Chile ====
Colombia
0
Club Deportivo de Ibagué, Ibagué, Colombia
11 April 2026
Clay

Chile
2

| | | | 1 | 2 | 3 |
|---|---|---|---|---|---|---|
| 1 | (Colombia) (Chile) | Valentina Mediorreal Arias; Fernanda Labraña | 1; 6 | 5; 7 |
| 2 | (Colombia) (Chile) | Emiliana Arango; Antonia Vergara Rivera | 6; 2 | 1; 6 | 4; 6 |
| 3 | (Colombia) (Chile) | Emiliana Arango / Valentina Mediorreal Arias; Jimar Geraldine Gonzalez / Antonia Vergara Rivera | | | | not played |

=== Promotions/Relegations ===
- Argentina and Brazil advanced to the 2026 Billie Jean King Cup play-offs.
- Colombia and Venezuela were relegated to Americas Zone Group II in 2027.
