= 2026 Copa LP Chile – Singles =

Singles
- 2026 Copa LP Chile

Final
- Champion: (Switzerland) Rebeka Masarova
- Runner-up: (Spain) Leyre Romero Gormaz
- Score: 6–4, 6–4

Details
- Draw: 32 (4 WC)
- Seeds: 8

Events
Singles	Doubles
- Copa LP Chile

Rebeka Masarova won the singles title at the 2026 Copa LP Chile, defeating Leyre Romero Gormaz in the final, 6–4, 6–4.

Oleksandra Oliynykova was the reigning champion, but did not participate this year.

== Seeds ==
1. (Spain) Leyre Romero Gormaz (final)
2. (Czech Republic) Laura Samson (quarterfinals)
3. (Italy) Lucia Bronzetti (semifinals)
4. (Spain) Andrea Lázaro García (quarterfinals)
5. (Spain) Guiomar Maristany (semifinals)
6. (Switzerland) Rebeka Masarova (champion)
7. (Slovenia) Veronika Erjavec (second round)
8. (Latvia) Darja Semeņistaja (first round)

== Draw ==
Key

- Q = Qualifier
- WC = Wild card
- LL = Lucky loser
- Alt = Alternate
- ITF = ITF entry
- PR = Protected ranking
- SR = Special ranking
- SE = Special exempt
- JE = Junior exempt
- JR = Junior Accelerator Programme entrant
- CO = College Accelerator Programme entrant
- NG = Next Gen Accelerator Program entrant
- w/o = Walkover
- r = Retired
- d = Defaulted

=== Finals ===
Semifinals
1	(Spain) Leyre Romero Gormaz	6	3	7
3	(Italy) Lucia Bronzetti	3	6	5
5	(Spain) Guiomar Maristany	2	4
6	(Switzerland) Rebeka Masarova	6	6

Final
1	(Spain) Leyre Romero Gormaz	4	4
6	(Switzerland) Rebeka Masarova	6	6

=== Top half ===
First round
1	(Spain) L Romero Gormaz	2	7	6
(Turkey) İ Öz	6	5	1
(Argentina) N Podoroska	6	7
(United States) V Lepchenko	3	5
(United States) K Scott	2	4
A Zolotareva	6	6
(Spain) I Burillo	6	6
8	(Latvia) D Semeņistaja	4	0
3	(Italy) L Bronzetti	6	6
(Spain) A Herrero Liñana	3	1
(Andorra) V Jiménez Kasintseva	5	6	0
(France) C Monnet	7	3	6
Q	(Ukraine) V Strakhova	6	4	6
A Tikhonova	2	6	4
(Argentina) ML Carlé	7	5	4
7	(Slovenia) V Erjavec	5	7	6

Second round
1	(Spain) L Romero Gormaz	6	6
(Argentina) N Podoroska	3	4
A Zolotareva	4	4
(Spain) I Burillo	6	6
3	(Italy) L Bronzetti	6	1	7^{7}
(France) C Monnet	4	6	6^{4}
Q	(Ukraine) V Strakhova	6	7^{7}
7	(Slovenia) V Erjavec	3	6^{3}

Quarterfinals
1	(Spain) L Romero Gormaz	6	6
(Spain) I Burillo	4	3
3	(Italy) L Bronzetti	6	6
Q	(Ukraine) V Strakhova	4	2

Semifinals
1	(Spain) L Romero Gormaz	6	3	7
3	(Italy) L Bronzetti	3	6	5

=== Bottom half ===
First round
5	(Spain) G Maristany	6	6
Q	(Italy) M Trevisan	2	3
(Belgium) S Costoulas	6	6
(Italy) N Brancaccio	2	4
WC	(Chile) F Labraña	6	3	6
WC	(Chile) A Vergara Rivera	1	6	0
WC	(Chile) B Gatica	6	2	3
4	(Spain) A Lázaro García	3	6	6
6	(Switzerland) R Masarova	7	6
Q	(Italy) D Cherubini	5	3
(Slovenia) P Hercog	7^{7}	6
WC	(Romania) M Bulgaru	6^{4}	4
(Argentina) L Giovannini	4	0
Q	(Spain) A Geerlings	6	6
(Greece) D Papamichail	6	3	4
2	(Czech Republic) L Samson	3	6	6

Second round
5	(Spain) G Maristany	7	6
(Belgium) S Costoulas	5	3
WC	(Chile) F Labraña	2	6	0
4	(Spain) A Lázaro García	6	3	6
6	(Switzerland) R Masarova	6	6
(Slovenia) P Hercog	4	4
Q	(Spain) A Geerlings	3	6	0
2	(Czech Republic) L Samson	6	2	6

Quarterfinals
5	(Spain) G Maristany	6	3	6
4	(Spain) A Lázaro García	2	6	4
6	(Switzerland) R Masarova	6	6
2	(Czech Republic) L Samson	3	2

Semifinals
5	(Spain) G Maristany	2	4
6	(Switzerland) R Masarova	6	6

== Qualifying ==
=== Seeds ===
1. (Spain) Ariana Geerlings (qualified)
2. (Italy) Martina Trevisan (qualified)
3. (Italy) Diletta Cherubini (qualified)
4. (Kazakhstan) Zhibek Kulambayeva (qualifying competition)

=== Qualifiers ===
1. (Spain) Ariana Geerlings
2. (Italy) Martina Trevisan
3. (Italy) Diletta Cherubini
4. (Ukraine) Valeriya Strakhova

=== Qualifying draw ===
==== First qualifier ====
Qualifying competition
1	(Spain) Ariana Geerlings	6	6
WC	(Chile) Camila Rodero Contreras	3	1

==== Second qualifier ====
Qualifying competition
2	(Italy) Martina Trevisan	6	6
WC	(Chile) Samantha Álvarez	1	0

==== Third qualifier ====
Qualifying competition
3	(Italy) Diletta Cherubini	6	6
	(Australia) Alexandra Osborne	2	2

==== Fourth qualifier ====
Qualifying competition
4	(Kazakhstan) Zhibek Kulambayeva	5	2
	(Ukraine) Valeriya Strakhova	7	6
