= 2026 Copa LP Chile – Doubles =

Doubles
- 2026 Copa LP Chile

Final
- Champions: (Slovenia) Veronika Erjavec (Kazakhstan) Zhibek Kulambayeva
- Runners-up: (Ukraine) Valeriya Strakhova; Anastasia Tikhonova
- Score: 6–4, 6–3

Events
Singles	Doubles
- Copa LP Chile

Veronika Erjavec and Zhibek Kulambayeva won the title, defeating Valeriya Strakhova and Anastasia Tikhonova 6–4, 6–3 in the final.

María Lourdes Carlé and Sara Sorribes Tormo were the reigning champions, but chose not to participate.

== Seeds ==
1. (Ukraine) Valeriya Strakhova / Anastasia Tikhonova (final)
2. (Slovenia) Veronika Erjavec / (Kazakhstan) Zhibek Kulambayeva (champions)

== Draw ==
Quarterfinals
1	(Ukraine) V Strakhova; A Tikhonova	6	6
(Spain) I Burillo; A Zolotareva	1	4
(Italy) N Brancaccio (Spain) G Maristany	6	6
(Belgium) S Costoulas (Latvia) D Semeņistaja	2	4
Alt	(Andorra) V Jiménez Kasintseva (United States) V Lepchenko	5	5
(Australia) T McGiffin (Australia) A Osborne	7	7
(Turkey) İ Öz (Greece) D Papamichail	0	2
2	(Slovenia) V Erjavec (Kazakhstan) Z Kulambayeva	6	6

Semifinals
1	(Ukraine) V Strakhova; A Tikhonova	0	7^{7}	[10]
(Italy) N Brancaccio (Spain) G Maristany	6	6^{4}	[8]
(Australia) T McGiffin (Australia) A Osborne	6^{7}	6	[4]
2	(Slovenia) V Erjavec (Kazakhstan) Z Kulambayeva	7^{9}	3	[10]

Final
1	(Ukraine) V Strakhova; A Tikhonova	4	3
2	(Slovenia) V Erjavec (Kazakhstan) Z Kulambayeva	6	6
