= Dana Guzmán =

Peruvian tennis player (born 2003)

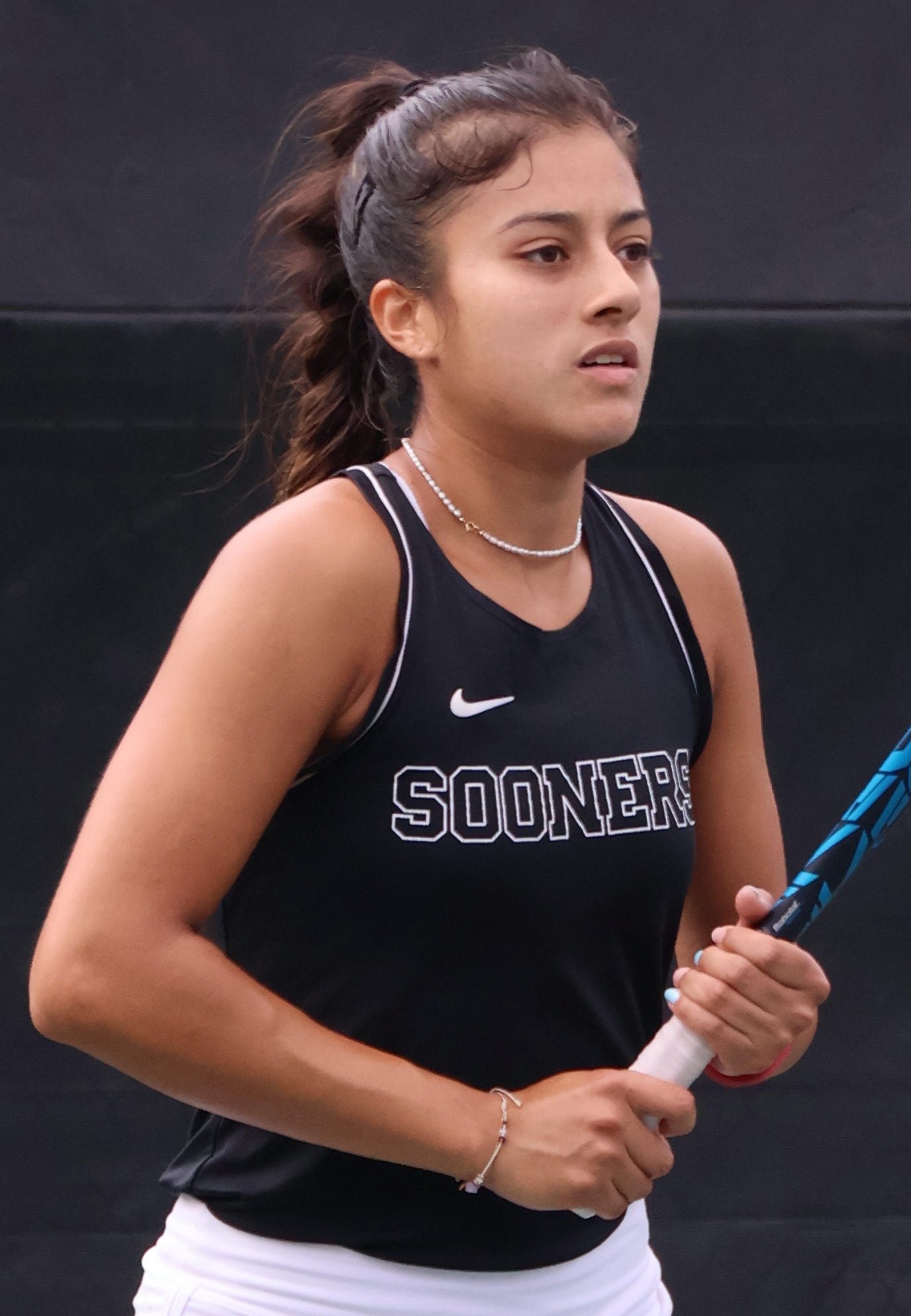
- Guzmán in 2023
- Country (sports): Peru
- Born: 22 March 2003 (age 23) Piura, Peru
- Plays: Right-handed (two-handed backhand)
- Prize money: $18,748

Singles
- Career record: 28–16
- Highest ranking: No. 431 (09 Noviembre 2026)
- Current ranking: No. 431 (09 Noviembre 2026)

Grand Slam singles results
- French Open Junior: 1R (2021)
- Wimbledon Junior: 1R (2021)
- US Open Junior: 2R (2021)

Doubles
- Career record: 12–11
- Career titles: 1 ITF
- Highest ranking: No. 642 (18 August 2025)
- Current ranking: No. 1026 (22 December 2025)

Grand Slam doubles results
- French Open Junior: 1R (2021)
- Wimbledon Junior: 1R (2021)
- US Open Junior: 2R (2021)

Team competitions
- Fed Cup: 12–6
- Last updated on: 11 August 2025.

Dana Francesca Guzmán Alcas (born 22 March 2003) is a Peruvian tennis player. She plays college tennis for the Oklahoma Sooners.

Guzmán has a career high ITF junior ranking of 11, achieved on 4 January 2021. She became the first Peruvian player to obtain the highest ranking in the ITF Junior Women and the first South American player in the Top 20.

Guzmán represents Peru in the Billie Jean King Cup.

== Career ==
Guzmán has defended the national team in the Billie Jean King Cup and also has qualified for two junior Grand Slams: the US Open and the Roland Garros. At the Junior level she has obtained multiple titles, both in singles and doubles.

After completing her secondary studies at the Colegio Anglo Americano Prescott in Arequipa, Guzmán dedicated herself entirely to her studies at the University of Oklahoma, only playing championships for the university,

In 2024, at the age of 21, taking advantage of the holidays, Guzmán registered for two ITF tournaments in Arequipa where she had good results, earning 24 points in the ITF ranking and winning her first professional tournament in doubles with the French Tiantsoa Sarah Rakotomanga Rajaonah, defeating the duo of Gabriella Price and Alicia Herrero Liñana by 3-6, 6-4 and 10-6 at the final.

Guzmán is currently studying at university, but from time to time enters professional tournaments in the United States.

In April 2026, Guzmán represented Peru at the Billie Jean King Cup in Ibagué, Colombia for the Americas Zone Group I stage of the tournament.

On the third day of competition, Peru faced Brazil. Guzmán played on the doubles match alongside Romina Ccuno. The duo lost in two sets, against Ana Candiotto and Victoria Luiza Barros. Brazil won the tie by 3 X 0.

In September 2026, Dana won the gold medal at the 2026 South American Games in Santa Fe, defeating Argentine player Jazmín Ortenzi 2–0 (6–0, 6–3). In the quarterfinals, she had overcome another Argentine, Luisina Giovannini, in an intense 2–1 match (6–4, 2–6, 6–2)—two major victories against higher-ranked tennis players.

== ITF Circuit finals ==
=== Singles: 4 (1 title, 3 runner–ups) ===
Legend W25/35 tournaments	Finals by surface Hard (1–1) Clay (0–2)

Result	W–L	Date	Tournament	Tier	Surface	Opponent	Score
Loss	0–1	Jul 2025	ITF Pergamino, Argentina	W35	Clay	(Argentina) Luisina Giovannini	3–6, 1–6
Loss	0–2	Aug 2025	ITF Chacabuco, Argentina	W35	Clay	(Argentina) Luisina Giovannini	7–6^{(5)}, 3–6, 3–6
Win	1–2	Aug 2026	(United States) ITF Southaven, USA	W35	Hard	(United States) Annika Penickova	6–2, 6–4
Loss	1–3	Nov 2026	(United States) ITF Norman, USA	W35	Hard	Alina Shcherbinina	5–7, 4–6

=== Doubles: 1 (title) ===
Legend W25/35 tournaments	Finals by surface Clay (1–0)

Result	W–L	Date	Tournament	Tier	Surface	Partner	Opponents	Score
Win	1–0	Aug 2024	ITF Arequipa, Peru	W35	Clay	(France) Tiantsoa Sarah Rakotomanga Rajaonah	(Spain) Alicia Herrero Liñana (United States) Gabriella Price	3–6, 6–4, [10–6]

== Junior Circuit finals ==
Legend
Grade 1 Tournaments
Grade 2 Tournaments
Grade 3 Tournaments
Grade 4 Tournaments
Grade 5 Tournaments

=== Singles ===
Result	Date	Tournament	Surface	Opponents	Score
Win	01-09-2020	(Paraguay) J1 Lambare Asunción	Clay	(France) Anaelle Leclercq	6–3, 6–0
Win	18-01-2020	(Colombia) J1 Barranquilla	Hard	(United States) Hina Inoue	7- 6, 6-3
Win	18-08-2020	(Peru) Arequipa Junior Open	Clay	(Peru) Daniela Ramos	6-2, Retired
Win	04-10 2018	(Colombia) Copa Indervalle	Clay	(Colombia) Laura Sofía Rico garcía	6-4, 6-0
Win	02-05-2018	(Bolivia) Chuquiago Junior Open 2018	Clay	(Bolivia) Frances Antesana Dorado	6-0, 3-6, 6-2
Win	19-05-2018	Peru Junior Open	Clay	(Peru) Daianne Hayashida	6-3, 6-3
Win	12-05-2018	(Peru) Regatas Junior Open	Clay	(Peru) Karen Siu	6-3, 6-4
Win	04-11-2017	(Peru) Inka Bowl	Clay	(Georgia (country)) Ana Makatsaria	6-1, 2-6, 7-6
Win	20-05-2017	Peru Junior Open	Clay	(Colombia) Ariana Chan Baratau	6-4, 9-3
Win	29-10-2016	(Bolivia) Chuquiago Junior Open	Clay	(Canada) Raphaelle Lacasse	6-4, 1-6, 7-5

=== Doubles ===
Result	Date	Tournament	Surface	Partner	Opponents	Score
Win	02-09-2017	(Chile) Open Junior ITF Vina Del Mar	Clay	(Chile) Florencia Araya	(Spain) Pilar Astigarraga (Colombia) Antonia Samudio	7–6, 6–3
Win	12-05-2018	(Peru) Regatas Junior Open	Clay	(Peru) Camila Soares	(Peru) Daianne Hayashida (Colombia) Ana Paula Jimenez	6–3, 6–1
Win	19-05-2018	Peru Junior Open	Clay	(Peru) Camila Soares	(Bolivia) Isabella Ciacaglini (Colombia) María Camila Torres	Retired
Win	09-11-2019	(Peru) J2 Lima	Clay	(Mexico) Julia García	(Peru) Romina Ccuno (Ecuador) Mell Reasco Gonzalez	6-3, 7-5
Win	18-01-2020	(Colombia) J1 Barranquilla	Hard	(Colombia) Sofía Cabezas	(Belgium) Tilwith Di Girolami (Belgium) Amelie Van Impe	6-3, 7-6
Win	22-02-2020	(Brazil) JB1 Brasilia	Clay	(Peru) Daianne Hayashida	(Peru) Camila Soares (Uruguay) Guillermina Grant	6-2, 6-2
