= São Paulo Torneio Internacional de Tênis Feminino =

- 2025 São Paulo Torneio Internacional de Tênis Feminino

ITF Women's Tour
- Event name: São Paulo Torneio Internacional de Tênis Feminino
- Location: São Paulo, Brazil
- Venue: Clube Paineiras do Morumby
- Category: ITF Women's World Tennis Tour
- Surface: Clay
- Draw: 32S/32Q/16D
- Prize money: $35,000
- Website: Official website

The São Paulo Torneio Internacional de Tênis Feminino is a tournament for professional female tennis players played on outdoor clay courts. The event is currently classified as a $35,000 ITF Women's World Tennis Tour tournament and has been held in São Paulo, Brazil, since 2024.

== Past finals ==
=== Singles ===
Year	Champion	Runner-up	Score
2024	(Brazil) Laura Pigossi	(Italy) Beatrice Ricci	6–7^{(3)}, 6–3, 6–3
2025	(Brazil) Laura Pigossi	(Brazil) Carolina Alves	5–7, 7–5, 6–2

=== Doubles ===
Year	Champions	Runners-up	Score
2024	(Italy) Nicole Fossa Huergo (Kazakhstan) Zhibek Kulambayeva	(Greece) Eleni Christofi (Italy) Aurora Zantedeschi	3–6, 6–2, [10–4]
2025	(Brazil) Ana Candiotto (Brazil) Nauhany Vitória Leme da Silva	(Argentina) Jazmín Ortenzi (Colombia) María Paulina Pérez	6–4, 6–2
