= Maja Chwalińska =

Polish tennis player (born 2001)

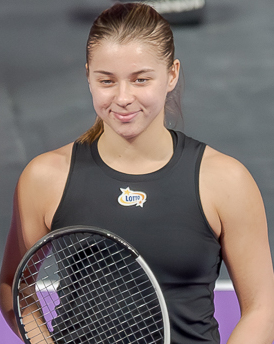
- Chwalińska in 2025
- Country (sports): Poland
- Residence: Dąbrowa Górnicza, Poland
- Born: 11 October 2001 (age 25) Miechów, Poland
- Height: 1.65 m (5 ft 5 in)
- Turned pro: 2015
- Plays: Left (two-handed backhand)
- Coach: Jaroslav Machovský
- Prize money: $3,659,671

Singles
- Career record: 287–147
- Career titles: 1
- Highest ranking: No. 11 (19 October 2026)
- Current ranking: No. 12 (9 November 2026)

Grand Slam singles results
- Australian Open: 1R (2025)
- French Open: F (2026)
- Wimbledon: 2R (2022)
- US Open: 1R (2026)

Doubles
- Career record: 124–55
- Career titles: 3 WTA 125
- Highest ranking: No. 91 (9 June 2025)
- Current ranking: No. 168 (9 November 2026)

Grand Slam doubles results
- US Open: 2R (2026)

Team competitions
- Fed Cup: 4–3
- Last updated on: 11 November 2026.

Maja Ewa Chwalińska (Polish: [ˈmaja xfaˈliɲska]; born 11 October 2001) is a Polish professional tennis player. She has a career-high WTA rankings of No. 11 in singles, achieved on 19 October 2026, and No. 91 in doubles, reached in June 2025. Chwalińska has won one WTA Tour singles title at the 2026 Wuhan Open, a WTA 1000 event. Her best performance at the majors was finishing runner-up at the 2026 French Open, achieved as a qualifier.

== Early life and background ==
Chwalińska was born on 11 October 2001 in Miechów to Marcela and Tomasz Chwaliński. Her father is a former miner and electrician while her mother is a receptionist. Chwalińska was raised in Dąbrowa Górnicza, an industrial city in the coal-mining south of Poland. She started playing tennis at the age of 7, inspired by Roger Federer, Rafael Nadal, and Novak Djokovic. Long before her breakthrough on the senior WTA tour, Chwalińska was regarded as one of Poland’s brightest junior talents. Early in her life, Maja became close friends with Iga Świątek. “We’ve known each other since we were 10 years old,” Chwalińska revealed to Roland Garros. They were runners-up in the Australian Open 2017 girls’ doubles and won the European junior doubles titles and helped Poland capture the Junior Fed Cup crown in 2016.

After Chwalińska reached the final at the 2026 French Open, 90,000 concertgoers paid tribute to her at the Silesian Stadium in Chorzów, in southern Poland. Polish pop star Dawid Podsiadło and the Polish crowd sang “Sto lat,” a traditional Polish song wishing her a happy life. Podsiadło, who like Maja comes from Dąbrowa Górnicza, had promised to lead the tribute before the French Open final. When he asked Chwalińska on social media whether he would be allowed to hold the trophy if she won, Chwalińska, who didn't reply until after the match was finished, said that although she had not returned with the championship trophy, she could offer him the silver plate awarded to the runner-up.

== Career ==
=== 2015–17: Juniors ===
She won the European 14-and-under doubles title in 2015 and the 16-and-under doubles title in 2016, both with Iga Świątek. She was a member of the Polish team which won the Junior Fed Cup title in 2016, and she made the final of the 2017 Australian Open junior doubles. She won the 16-and-under singles title six months later. Her highest junior Tennis Europe ranking was No. 6 in August 2017.

=== 2019: Fed Cup debut ===
Poland hosted the Europe/Africa I Fed Cup pool at Zielona Góra in February. Chwalińska represented her country at senior level for the first time in the tie against Denmark, where she partnered Alicja Rosolska in the doubles. They defeated Maria Jespersen and Hannah Viller Møller, recording her first Fed Cup win. She reached the doubles final of the ITF event in Trnava the following week and the singles semifinals in Altenkirchen the week after. She and Ulrikke Eikeri won the doubles title at the ITF tournament in Sunderland, England. Chwalińska's first singles title followed in July in Bytom. A week later, she made two singles titles in a row on the Polish swing of the circuit.

=== 2020–21: Grand Slam tournament qualifying ===
Chwalińska made her qualifying debut at the 2020 Australian Open, where she lost in the first round to Isabella Shinikova. She returned to tournament play in August at the 2020 Prague Open, which had been upgraded to replace the cancelled US Open qualifying competition.

Chwalińska lost to Yuan Yue in the first round of qualifying for the 2021 Australian Open, which was held in Dubai, before reaching the semifinals of a $25k tournament in Grenoble, but aggravated her wrist injury in Altenkirchen the following week and had to withdraw from her first match. She then went to Argentina for a series of $25k tournaments, but contracted COVID-19 and had to return home, after quarantining without playing a match.

In 2021, at 19 years old, she announced she would be putting her professional career on hold. She revealed she was suffering from severe depression and would be taking time off from the courts to fight the problem. Through a social media post, Chwalińska stated she had been dealing with depression since the end of 2019.

=== 2022–23: Major debut at Wimbledon and first win ===
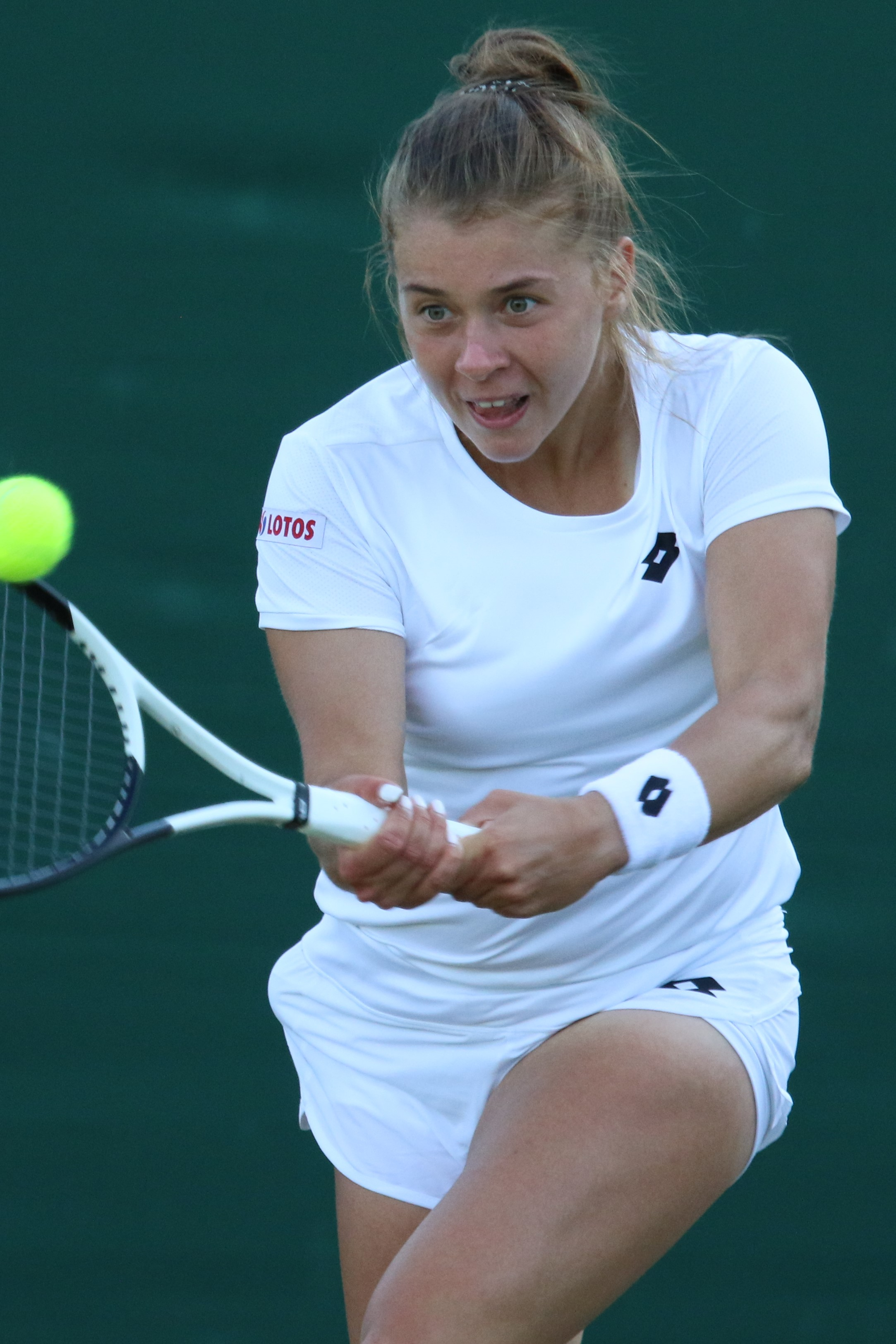
Chwalińska at the 2022 Wimbledon qualifying

Chwalińska qualified for her first main draw at the 2022 Wimbledon Championships, defeating second seed CoCo Vandeweghe in the final round of qualifying. She defeated Kateřina Siniaková for her first singles win. For her WTA Tour debut outside the majors, Chwalińska was given a wildcard entry into the main draw of the 2022 Poland Open, where she recorded her second tour-level win over Rebeka Masarova. In September 2022, after losing in the second round of qualifying at the 2022 US Open against Elina Avanesyan, Chwalińska underwent right knee surgery. She returned to competition in March 2023. At the 2023 Poland Open, where she also entered as a wildcard, she lost to Laura Siegemund in the first round.

=== 2024–25: WTA 125 singles & doubles titles, top 150 ===
In October 2024, Chwalińska qualified for the main draw at the Mérida Open and defeated Rebecca Marino for her first WTA Tour win on hardcourts, where she lost to top seed Renata Zarazúa.

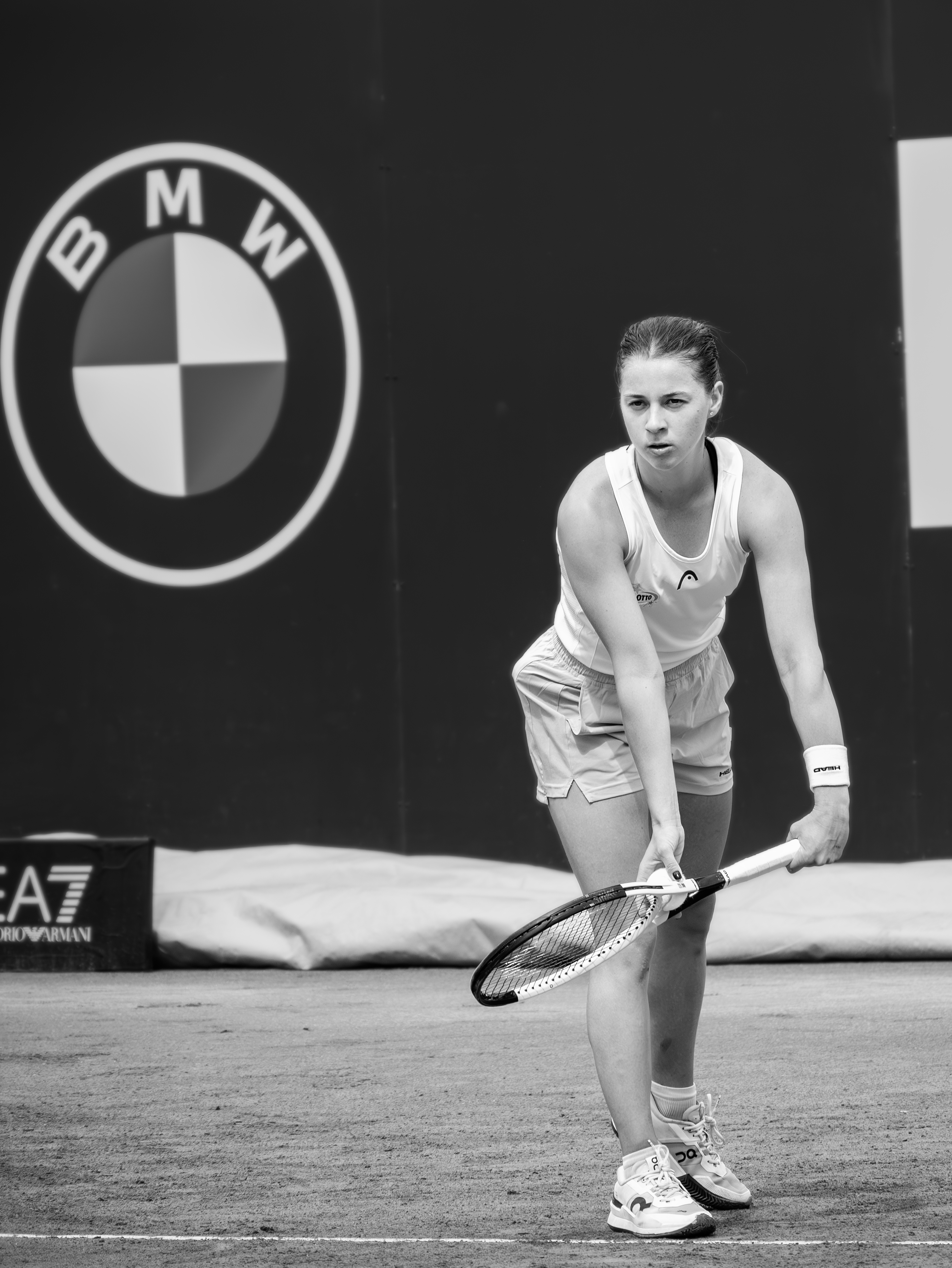
Chwalińska at the 2025 Italian Open

Partnering with Katarzyna Kawa, Chwalińska won her first WTA 125 doubles title at the 2024 Argentina Open defeating Laura Pigossi and Mayar Sherif in the final, which went to a deciding tiebreak. The following week, she won her first WTA 125 singles title at the MundoTenis Open in Florianópolis, Brazil overcoming Ylena In-Albon in the final in straight sets. Alongside Pigossi, she also won the doubles title, defeating Nicole Fossa Huergo and Valeriya Strakhova in the final. Chwalińska reached a new career-high singles ranking of world No. 128 on 9 December 2024.

At the 2025 Iași Open, Chwalińska defeated Iryna Shymanovich to record her first WTA Tour win since 2024, before losing to sixth seed Jil Teichmann in the second round. Chwalińska won her second WTA 125 singles title at the 2025 Montreux Ladies Open, defeating fifth seed Darja Semeņistaja in the final.

=== 2026: French Open finalist, WTA 1000 title, top 20 ===
In February, in Cluj-Napoca, Transylvania, Chwalińska recorded two WTA Tour-level wins over Ana Bogdan and Olga Danilović as a qualifier. In April, she won her third WTA 125 singles title at the Oeiras Ladies Open.

Chwalińska at the 2026 Transylvania Open

Ranked No. 114, Chwalińska qualified for her first major main draw at the 2026 French Open in her Paris debut by defeating Alice Ramé, Carole Monnet and Suzan Lamens. She reached the third round with wins over Zheng Qinwen, and 23rd seed Elise Mertens, both in straight sets. She reached the fourth round by defeating Maria Sakkari and joined compatriot and world No. 3, Iga Świątek, as the first two Polish players to reach the fourth round at Roland Garros the same year. It marked the third time in history that Poland had two competitors at that stage at one of the four majors, after Marta Domachowska and Agnieszka Radwańska (at the 2008 Australian Open), and Magda Linette and Świątek (at the 2023 Australian Open). Chwalińska then defeated home favorite Diane Parry to reach the quarterfinals for the first time, thereby becoming only the fourth Polish major quarterfinalist in the Open Era, following Radwańska, Świątek, and Linette. She continued her run by defeating 22nd seed Anna Kalinskaya, and 25th seed Diana Shnaider in the semifinals, becoming the first qualifier ever to play the final at Roland Garros, and the second qualifier finalist at a major, after Emma Raducanu at the 2021 US Open. Chwalińska lost in the final to No. 8 seed Mirra Andreeva. As a result, she climbed to world No. 21, on 8 June 2026.

At the start of the grass-court season, she earned a wildcard for the 2026 Wimbledon Championships. Seeded No. 20, Chwalińska entered Wimbledon with direct main-draw status for the first time in her career. As a result, she became the third wildcard player to be seeded in a major (after Martina Hingis in 2002 and Patty Schnyder in 2004).

Chwalińska lost her Wimbledon main-draw debut as a seeded player against qualifier Mananchaya Sawangkaew in three sets, after holding a match point at 6–2, 5–2. During that point, she slipped and injured her right ankle, requiring a medical timeout. Although she resumed play, her movement was affected, allowing Sawangkaew to rally for her first major main-draw victory.

In September, Chwalińska defeated fourth-seeded defending champion Elise Mertens to reach the Singapore semifinals. Seeded fifth, she reached her first semifinal since the French Open but lost to Leylah Fernandez, in three sets.

At Wuhan Open, Chwalińska, seeded No. 16, defeated Mayar Sherif, Marie Bouzková, Iva Jovic and Maria Sakkari to reach her first WTA 1000 semifinal. She then defeated fellow Polish player Iga Świątek, in straight sets, saving two set points to advance to her maiden WTA 1000 final. Chwalińska went on to claim the title with a three-set victory over Sonay Kartal. Following her remarkable performance, she achieved a career-high WTA singles ranking of world No. 11. Chwalińska also became the fourth player since 2009 to win her first career title at the WTA 1000-level, after Naomi Osaka, Bianca Andreescu, and Victoria Mboko.

== Playing style ==
Chwalińska's game is characterized as "full of craft and guile". At only 5 ft 5 in (1.65 m), Chwalińska does not have the power to blast players off court and instead focuses her game on slice, topspin, and drop shots, a style which she has acknowledged is "very annoying for other players". She frequently constructs points methodically rather than quickly, and frustrates opponents by consistently returning their attempted winners rather than attempting many of her own. Her style of play translates particularly well to clay courts, evidenced by her breakthrough at the 2026 French Open.

== Career statistics ==
=== Grand Slam tournament performance ===
Key
| W | F | SF | QF | #R | RR | Q# | DNQ | A | NH |

(W) winner; (F) finalist; (SF) semifinalist; (QF) quarterfinalist; (#R) rounds 4, 3, 2, 1; (RR) round-robin stage; (Q#) qualification round; (DNQ) did not qualify; (A) absent; (NH) not held; (SR) strike rate (events won / competed); (W–L) win–loss record.
To avoid confusion and double counting, these charts are updated at the conclusion of a tournament or when the player's participation has ended.

==== Singles ====
| Tournament | 2020 | 2021 | 2022 | 2023 | 2024 | 2025 | 2026 | SR | W–L | Win % |
|---|---|---|---|---|---|---|---|---|---|---|
| Australian Open | Q1 | Q1 | A | A | A | 1R | Q3 | 0 / 1 | 0–1 | 0% |
| French Open | A | Q1 | A | Q2 | A | Q2 | F | 0 / 1 | 6–1 | 86% |
| Wimbledon | NH | Q1 | 2R | Q1 | A | Q1 | 1R | 0 / 2 | 1–2 | 33% |
| US Open | A | A | Q2 | A | Q1 | Q2 | 1R | 0 / 1 | 0–1 | 0% |
| Win–Loss | 0–0 | 0–0 | 1–1 | 0–0 | 0–0 | 0–1 | 6–3 | 0 / 5 | 7–5 | 58% |

=== Grand Slam tournament finals ===
==== Singles: 1 (runner-up) ====
| Result | Year | Tournament | Surface | Opponent | Score |
|---|---|---|---|---|---|
| Loss | 2026 | French Open | Clay | Mirra Andreeva | 3–6, 2–6 |

=== WTA 1000 finals ===
==== Singles: 1 (title) ====
| Result | Year | Tournament | Surface | Opponent | Score |
|---|---|---|---|---|---|
| Win | 2026 | Wuhan Open | Hard | (United Kingdom) Sonay Kartal | 2–6, 6–4, 6–2 |
