= Eleni Christofi =

Greek tennis player (born 1998)

- Native name: Ελένη Χριστοφή
- Country (sports): Greece
- Born: 9 August 1998 (age 28)
- Plays: Right (two-handed backhand)
- Prize money: $52,705

Singles
- Career record: 119–100
- Career titles: 0
- Highest ranking: No. 656 (21 October 2024)

Doubles
- Career record: 141–72
- Career titles: 16 ITF
- Highest ranking: No. 192 (21 October 2024)

Team competitions
- Fed Cup: 5–1

Eleni Christofi (Greek: Ελένη Χριστοφή; born 9 August 1998) is an inactive Greek tennis player.

== Career ==
Christofi has a career-high doubles ranking by the WTA of 192, achieved on 21 October 2024. She has won 16 doubles titles on the ITF Women's World Tennis Tour.

On the junior tour, Christofi has a career-high junior ranking of 61, achieved January 2016.

Playing for Greece in the Billie Jean King Cup, Christofi has a win–loss record of 5–1 as of July 2024.

== Juniors ==
=== Grand Slam performance ===
Singles:

- Australian Open: 1R (2016)
- French Open: 1R (2016)
- Wimbledon: Q2 (2015, 2016)
- US Open: Q2 (2015)

Doubles:

- Australian Open: 1R (2016)
- French Open: QF (2016)
- Wimbledon: QF (2016)
- US Open: 1R (2015)

== ITF Circuit finals ==
=== Singles: 1 (runner-up) ===
Legend W15 tournaments	Finals by surface Clay (0–1)

Result	Date	Tournament	Tier	Surface	Opponent	Score
Loss	May 2023	ITF Kuršumlijska Banja, Serbia	W15	Clay	(Kazakhstan) Zhibek Kulambayeva	3–6, 1–6

=== Doubles: 26 (16 titles, 10 runner-ups) ===
Legend
W100 tournaments
W75 tournaments
W50 tournaments
W25/35 tournaments
W10/15 tournaments

Result	W–L	Date	Tournament	Tier	Surface	Partner	Opponents	Score
Win	1–0	Nov 2015	ITF Heraklion, Greece	W10	Hard	(Netherlands) Phillis Vanenburg	(Greece) Valentini Grammatikopoulou (Netherlands) Janneke Wikkerink	6–3, 6–3
Win	2–0	Nov 2015	ITF Heraklion, Greece	W10	Hard	(Israel) Vlada Ekshibarova	(Switzerland) Karin Kennel (Bulgaria) Viktoriya Tomova	4–6, 6–3, [10–1]
Win	3–0	Nov 2021	ITF Heraklion, Greece	W15	Clay	(Greece) Martha Matoula	(Romania) Ilinca Amariei (Romania) Simona Ogescu	6–3, 6–2
Win	4–0	Nov 2021	ITF Heraklion, Greece	W15	Clay	(Greece) Dimitra Pavlou	(Italy) Giorgia Pinto (Japan) Risa Ushijima	6–3, 7–6
Win	5–0	Mar 2022	ITF Monastir, Tunisia	W15	Hard	(Greece) Michaela Laki	(Japan) Haruna Arakawa (Japan) Natsuho Arakawa	7–5, 6–3
Win	6–0	Jun 2022	ITF Heraklion, Greece	W15	Clay	(Australia) Gabriella Da Silva-Fick	(Ukraine) Mariia Bergen (Bulgaria) Beatris Spasova	6–0, 6–1
Loss	6–1	Aug 2022	ITF Parnu, Estonia	W25	Clay	(Bulgaria) Gergana Topalova	(Ukraine) Valeriya Strakhova (Lithuania) Justina Mikulskytė	2–6, 6–4, [8–10]
Loss	6–2	Oct 2022	ITF Šibenik, Croatia	W25	Clay	(United States) Christina Rosca	(Poland) Weronika Falkowska (Australia) Jaimee Fourlis	4–6, 2–6
Loss	6–3	Nov 2022	ITF Heraklion, Greece	W15	Clay	(Germany) Silvia Ambrosio	(Romania) Ilinca Amariei (Greece) Elena Korokozidi	5–7, 6–7^{(5)}
Loss	6–4	Dec 2022	ITF Antalya, Turkey	W15	Clay	Anna Ureke	(Croatia) Mariana Dražić (Hungary) Amarissa Tóth	6–1, 5–7, [4–10]
Loss	6–5	Feb 2023	ITF Monastir, Tunisia	W15	Hard	(United States) Paris Corley	(Switzerland) Leonie Küng (Japan) Naho Sato	2–6, 1–6
Loss	6–6	Mar 2023	ITF Monastir, Tunisia	W15	Hard	(United States) Paris Corley	(China) Liu Fangzhou (Japan) Naho Sato	4–6, 1–6
Win	7–6	Mar 2023	ITF Heraklion, Greece	W15	Clay	(Greece) Dimitra Pavlou	(Romania) Anastasia Safta (Romania) Lavinia Tanasie	7–5, 6–2
Loss	7–7	May 2023	Open Villa de Madrid, Spain	W100	Clay	(Greece) Despina Papamichail	(Japan) Mai Hontama (Japan) Eri Hozumi	0–6, 5–7
Win	8–7	May 2023	ITF Kuršumlijska Banja, Serbia	W15	Clay	(Switzerland) Sebastianna Scilipoti	(Belgium) Tilwith di Girolami (Slovakia) Nina Vargová	5–7, 6–4, [10–6]
Win	9–7	Jun 2023	ITF Kuršumlijska Banja, Serbia	W15	Clay	(Serbia) Natalija Senić	(Brazil) Ana Candiotto (Peru) Anastasia Iamachkine	7–6^{(5)}, 6–3
Win	10–7	Sep 2023	ITF Kuršumlijska Banja, Serbia	W15	Clay	(Serbia) Katarina Jokić	(Germany) Mara Guth; Elena Pridankina	6–2, 6–3
Win	11–7	Nov 2023	ITF Heraklion, Greece	W15	Clay	(Lithuania) Patricija Paukštytė	(Slovakia) Karolina Krajmer (Estonia) Andrea Rootsa	6–3, 6–1
Win	12–7	Mar 2024	ITF Heraklion, Greece	W15	Clay	(Greece) Sapfo Sakellaridi	(France) Lucie Nguyen Tan; Ksenia Zaytseva	6–3, 6–3
Win	13–7	Apr 2024	ITF Santa Margherita di Pula, Italy	W35	Clay	(Bulgaria) Lia Karatancheva	(Italy) Eleonora Alvisi (Italy) Federica Urgesi	6–0, 6–4
Loss	13–8	Apr 2024	ITF Santa Margherita di Pula, Italy	W35	Clay	(Greece) Sapfo Sakellaridi	(Poland) Martyna Kubka (Netherlands) Eva Vedder	5–7, 3–6
Win	14–8	May 2024	ITF Platja d'Aro, Spain	W35	Clay	(Latvia) Daniela Vismane	(Portugal) Matilde Jorge (Latvia) Diāna Marcinkēviča	6–4, 6–2
Win	15–8	May 2024	Open Villa de Madrid, Spain	W100	Clay	(Australia) Destanee Aiava	(Venezuela) Andrea Gámiz (Netherlands) Eva Vedder	6–3, 2–6, [10–5]
Loss	15–9	Sep 2024	ITF São Paulo, Brazil	W75	Clay	(Italy) Aurora Zantedeschi	(Italy) Nicole Fossa Huergo (Kazakhstan) Zhibek Kulambayeva	6–3, 2–6, [4–10]
Win	16–9	Nov 2024	ITF Heraklion, Greece	W15	Clay	(Greece) Sapfo Sakellaridi	(Norway) Astrid Wanja Brune Olsen (Germany) Franziska Sziedat	walkover
Loss	16–10	Mar 2025	ITF Chihuahua, Mexico	W50	Clay	(Greece) Despina Papamichail	(United States) Jessie Aney (United States) Jessica Failla	3–6, 5–7
