= Aurora Zantedeschi =

Italian tennis player

- Country (sports): Italy
- Born: 2 November 2000 (age 25) Verona, Italy
- Plays: Right (two-handed backhand)
- Prize money: $171,472

Singles
- Career record: 249–186
- Career titles: 3 ITF
- Highest ranking: No. 277 (10 August 2026)
- Current ranking: No. 296 (31 August 2026)

Doubles
- Career record: 206–113
- Career titles: 19 ITF
- Highest ranking: No. 102 (27 January 2025)
- Current ranking: No. 196 (31 August 2026)
Medal record
Mediterranean Games
Bronze medal – third place	2022 Oran	Women's doubles
- Last updated on: 10 September 2026.

Aurora Zantedeschi (born 2 November 2000) is an Italian professional tennis player. She has a career-high WTA singles ranking of No. 277, achieved on 10 August 2026, and a best doubles ranking of No. 102, reached on 27 January 2025.

Zantedeschi has won three singles titles and 19 doubles titles on the ITF World Tennis Tour.

== Career ==
Zantedeschi made her maiden WTA Tour appearance at the 2023 Palermo Ladies Open, after qualifying for the main draw, where she lost to Diane Parry in the first round.

In 2024, she received a wildcard partnering with Anastasia Abbagnato for her home tournament, the WTA 1000 Italian Open, where they reached the second round with a win over Linda Nosková and Lucia Bronzetti.

Zantedeschi reached her first career doubles final at the 2024 Palermo Ladies Open with Yvonne Cavallé Reimers, losing to Alexandra Panova and Yana Sizikova.

== WTA Tour finals ==
=== Doubles: 1 (runner-up) ===
Legend WTA 250 (0–1)	Finals by surface Clay (0–1)

Result	W–L	Date	Tournament	Tier	Surface	Partner	Opponents	Score
Loss	0–1	Jul 2024	Palermo Ladies Open, Italy	WTA 250	Clay	(Spain) Yvonne Cavallé Reimers	Alexandra Panova; Yana Sizikova	6–4, 3–6, [5–10]

== WTA 125 finals ==
=== Doubles: 2 (runner-ups) ===
Result	W–L	Date	Tournament	Surface	Partner	Opponents	Score
Loss	0–1	Oct 2025	Internazionali di Calabria, Italy	Clay	(Italy) Federica Urgesi	(Italy) Nicole Fossa Huergo (Georgia (country)) Ekaterine Gorgodze	6–3, 1–6, [4–10]
Loss	0–2	Oct 2025	Internazionali di Rovereto, Italy	Hard (i)	(Italy) Silvia Ambrosio	(Czech Republic) Jesika Malečková (Czech Republic) Miriam Škoch	0–6, 6–4, [4–10]

== ITF Circuit finals ==
=== Singles: 10 (3 titles, 7 runner-ups) ===
Legend W60 tournaments (0–1) W50 tournaments (1–0) W35 tournaments (1–2) W15 tournaments (1–4)	Finals by surface Hard (0–1) Clay (3–6)

Result	W–L	Date	Tournament	Tier	Surface	Opponent	Score
Loss	0–1	Aug 2019	ITF Tabarka, Tunisia	W15	Clay	(Romania) Andreea Prisăcariu	6–2, 2–6, 1–6
Win	1–1	Sep 2019	ITF Tabarka, Tunisia	W15	Clay	(Italy) Martina Colmegna	6–3, 6–0
Loss	1–2	Jan 2021	ITF Antalya, Turkey	W15	Clay	(Serbia) Tamara Čurović	5–7, 6–7^{(4)}
Loss	1–3	Feb 2021	ITF Antalya, Turkey	W15	Clay	(Romania) Andreea Prisăcariu	3–6, 5–7
Loss	1–4	Aug 2023	Přerov Cup, Czech Republic	W60	Clay	(Serbia) Mia Ristić	1–6, 2–6
Loss	1–5	Sep 2024	ITF Leme, Brazil	W35	Clay	(Italy) Giorgia Pedone	2–6, 3–6
Loss	1–6	Feb 2025	ITF Monastir, Tunisia	W15	Hard	(Italy) Silvia Ambrosio	4–6, 1–6
Win	2–6	Mar 2025	ITF Vacaria, Brazil	W50	Clay	Iryna Shymanovich	4–6, 7–5, 7–5
Win	3–6	May 2026	ITF Bol, Croatia	W35	Clay	(New Zealand) Valentina Ivanov	6–3, 6–2
Loss	3–7	Jun 2026	ITF Aix-les-Bains, France	W35	Clay	(Switzerland) Alina Granwehr	3–6, 3–6

=== Doubles: 38 (19 titles, 19 runner-ups) ===
Legend W60/75 tournaments (2–5) W40/50 tournaments (0–2) W25/35 tournaments (5–8) W15 tournaments (12–4)	Finals by surface Hard (1–1) Clay (18–18)

Result	W–L	Date	Tournament	Tier	Surface	Partner	Opponents	Score
Win	1–0	Jul 2018	ITF Schio, Italy	W15	Clay	(Italy) Costanza Traversi	(Switzerland) Jessica Criveletto (Luxembourg) Eléonora Molinaro	7–6^{(5)}, 7–6^{(4)}
Win	2–0	Aug 2018	ITF Biella, Italy	W15	Clay	(Italy) Costanza Traversi	(Russia) Sviatlana Pirazhenka (Italy) Dalila Spiteri	6–2, 6–3
Loss	2–1	Aug 2018	ITF Sezze, Italy	W15	Clay	(Italy) Costanza Traversi	(Spain) Noelia Bouzo Zanotti (Spain) Ángela Fita Boluda	3–6, 1–6
Win	3–1	Aug 2018	ITF Cuneo, Italy	W15	Clay	(Italy) Isabella Tcherkes Zade	(Italy) Jessica Bertoldo (Italy) Carlotta Ripa	6–3, 6–1
Win	4–1	Dec 2018	ITF Monastir, Tunisia	W15	Hard	(Italy) Angelica Raggi	(Serbia) Bojana Marinković (Belgium) Eliessa Vanlangendonck	6–4, 6–4
Win	5–1	Jul 2019	ITF Schio, Italy	W15	Clay	(Colombia) Yuliana Lizarazo	(Italy) Matilde Paoletti (Italy) Lisa Pigato	6–3, 1–6, [10–5]
Win	6–1	Oct 2019	ITF Tabarka, Tunisia	W15	Clay	(Italy) Giulia Crescenzi	(Netherlands) Isabelle Haverlag (Russia) Anastasia Pribylova	5–7, 7–6^{(4)}, [10–8]
Win	7–1	Oct 2019	ITF Tabarka, Tunisia	W15	Clay	(Italy) Martina Colmegna	(Slovenia) Pia Lovrič (Italy) Sara Ziodato	2–6, 6–2, [11–9]
Loss	7–2	Dec 2019	ITF Monastir, Tunisia	W15	Hard	(Venezuela) Nadia Echeverría Alam	(Spain) Yvonne Cavallé Reimers (Serbia) Bojana Marinković	7–5, 2–6, [9–11]
Win	8–2	Feb 2020	ITF Antalya, Turkey	W15	Clay	(Colombia) Yuliana Lizarazo	(China) Guo Meiqi (China) Han Jiangxue	6–2, 5–7, [10–4]
Win	9–2	Sep 2020	ITF Trieste, Italy	W15	Clay	(Colombia) Yuliana Lizarazo	(Italy) Melania Delai (Italy) Lisa Pigato	6–2, 6–3
Loss	9–3	Jan 2021	ITF Antalya, Turkey	W15	Clay	(Italy) Federica Arcidiacono	(Turkey) Cemre Anıl (Turkey) İpek Öz	2–6, 6–3, [6–10]
Loss	9–4	Jul 2021	ITF Torino, Italy	W25	Clay	(Italy) Lucia Bronzetti	(Italy) Federica di Sarra (Italy) Camilla Rosatello	2–6, 2–6
Loss	9–5	Mar 2022	ITF Palmanova, Spain	W15	Clay	(Italy) Angelica Moratelli	(Slovenia) Veronika Erjavec (Slovenia) Nina Potočnik	5–7, 3–6
Win	10–5	Mar 2022	ITF Palmanova, Spain	W15	Clay	(Italy) Angelica Moratelli	(Romania) Bianca Bărbulescu (Romania) Briana Szabó	7–5, 6–2
Loss	10–6	Jul 2022	Internazionali di Cordenons, Italy	W60	Clay	(Colombia) Yuliana Lizarazo	(Italy) Angelica Moratelli (Netherlands) Eva Vedder	3–6, 2–6
Win	11–6	Aug 2022	ITF Agadir, Morocco	W25	Clay	(Italy) Angelica Moratelli	(Sweden) Jacqueline Cabaj Awad (Italy) Martina Colmegna	6–2, 4–6, [10–8]
Loss	11–7	Oct 2022	ITF Santa Margherita di Pula, Italy	W25	Clay	(Italy) Camilla Rosatello	(United States) Jessie Aney (Greece) Sapfo Sakellaridi	6–7^{(1)}, 4–6
Loss	11–8	Sep 2023	ITF Santa Margherita di Pula	W25	Clay	(Spain) Yvonne Cavallé Reimers	(Georgia (country)) Ekaterine Gorgodze (Germany) Katharina Hobgarski	2–6, 4–6
Win	12–8	Mar 2024	ITF Antalya, Turkey	W15	Clay	(United States) Tyra Caterina Grant	(Ukraine) Yelyzaveta Kotliar (Ukraine) Antonina Sushkova	6–2, 6–2
Win	13–8	Mar 2024	ITF Santa Margherita di Pula	W35	Clay	(Greece) Sapfo Sakellaridi	(Czech Republic) Lucie Havlíčková (Serbia) Lola Radivojević	6–4, 6–2
Win	14–8	Apr 2024	ITF Santa Margherita di Pula	W35	Clay	(Spain) Yvonne Cavallé Reimers	(Greece) Sapfo Sakellaridi (India) Vasanti Shinde	3–6, 6–4, [11–9]
Loss	14–9	Apr 2024	Koper Open, Slovenia	W75	Clay	(Greece) Sapfo Sakellaridi	(Slovenia) Veronika Erjavec (Czech Republic) Dominika Šalková	1–6, 3–6
Loss	14–10	May 2024	Grado Tennis Cup, Italy	W75	Clay	(Spain) Yvonne Cavallé Reimers	(United States) Jessie Aney (Germany) Lena Papadakis	4–6, 5–7
Win	15–10	May 2024	Internazionali di Brescia, Italy	W75	Clay	(Spain) Yvonne Cavallé Reimers	(Kazakhstan) Zhibek Kulambayeva; Ekaterina Reyngold	3–6, 7–5, [10–6]
Win	16–10	Jul 2024	Roma Cup, Italy	W35	Clay	(Spain) Yvonne Cavallé Reimers	(Switzerland) Leonie Küng (United States) Rasheeda McAdoo	6–4, 6–3
Win	17–10	Aug 2024	Internazionali di Cordenons, Italy	W75	Clay	(Spain) Yvonne Cavallé Reimers	(Italy) Nuria Brancaccio (Spain) Leyre Romero Gormaz	7–5, 2–6, [10–5]
Loss	17–11	Aug 2024	ITF São Paulo, Brazil	W35	Clay	(Italy) Giorgia Pedone	(United States) Jaeda Daniel; Anastasiia Grechkina	walkover
Loss	17–12	Sep 2024	ITF Piracicaba, Brazil	W35	Clay	(Colombia) María Paulina Pérez	(Italy) Miriana Tona (Bolivia) Noelia Zeballos	7–5, 1–6, [10–12]
Loss	17–13	Sep 2024	ITF San Miguel de Tucumán, Argentina	W50	Clay	(Colombia) María Paulina Pérez	(Italy) Nicole Fossa Huergo (Kazakhstan) Zhibek Kulambayeva	3–6, 6–4, [7–10]
Loss	17–14	Sep 2024	São Paulo Internacional, Brazil	W75	Clay	(Greece) Eleni Christofi	(Italy) Nicole Fossa Huergo (Kazakhstan) Zhibek Kulambayeva	6–3, 2–6, [4–10]
Loss	17–15	May 2025	Portorož Open, Slovenia	W50	Clay	(Argentina) Jazmín Ortenzi	(United States) Rasheeda McAdoo (Greece) Sapfo Sakellaridi	4–6, 3–6
Win	18–15	Feb 2026	ITF Antalya, Turkiye	W35	Clay	(Italy) Jennifer Ruggeri	(Argentina) Luisina Giovannini (Chile) Antónia Vergara Rivera	6–4, 7–6^{(1)}
Win	19–15	Feb 2026	ITF Antalya, Turkiye	W15	Clay	(Italy) Giorgia Pedone	(China) Huang Yujia (Japan) Nanari Katsumi	6–2, 3–6, [10–4]
Loss	19–16	Feb 2026	ITF Antalya, Turkiye	W35	Clay	(Italy) Jennifer Ruggeri	(Germany) Joëlle Steur (Slovakia) Nina Vargová	6–1, 6–7^{(3)}, [7–10]
Loss	19–17	Mar 2026	ITF San Gregorio, Italy	W35	Clay	(Spain) Yvonne Cavallé Reimers	(Czech Republic) Aneta Kučmová (Greece) Sapfo Sakellaridi	2–6, 6–4, [6–10]
Loss	19–18	May 2026	ITF Bol, Croatia	W35	Clay	(Italy) Arianna Zucchini	(France) Yara Bartashevich (Poland) Weronika Falkowska	4–6, 2–6
Loss	19–19	Jul 2026	Ladies Open Hechingen, Germany	W75	Clay	(Greece) Sapfo Sakellaridi	(Italy) Enola Chiesa (Slovenia) Dalila Jakupović	3–6, 6–2, [10–12]
