= Zhibek Kulambayeva =

Kazakhstani tennis player (born 2000)

Zhibek Kulambayeva Жібек Құламбаева
- Country (sports): Kazakhstan
- Born: 26 March 2000 (age 26) Almaty, Kazakhstan
- Height: 1.72 m (5 ft 8 in)
- Plays: Right (two-handed backhand)
- Prize money: $244,020

Singles
- Career record: 274–215
- Career titles: 7 ITF
- Highest ranking: No. 292 (21 July 2025)
- Current ranking: No. 378 (16 November 2026)

Doubles
- Career record: 354–146
- Career titles: 3 WTA 125, 40 ITF
- Highest ranking: No. 86 (16 November 2026)
- Current ranking: No. 86 (16 November 2026)

Team competitions
- Fed Cup: 3–2
- Last updated on: 16 November 2026.

Zhibek Kulambayeva (Note: Kazakh: Жібек Құламбаева, romanized: Jıbek Qūlambaeva; Russian: Жибек Куламбаева; Russian pronunciation: [ʐɨˈbɛk kʊɫɐmˈba(ɪ̯)ɪvə]) (born 26 March 2000) is a Kazakh tennis player. She achieved career-high WTA rankings of 292 in singles and No. 102 in doubles.

In September 2025, partnering with Veronika Erjavec, she has won her biggest title at the WTA 125 Huzhou Open in China.

== Career overview ==
Kulambayeva made her debut for the Kazakhstan Fed Cup team in 2018. In 2021, she became the person with the most trophies in the ITF Women's Circuit with one singles and nine doubles titles, a total of 10 titles. Kulambayeva made her WTA Tour main-draw debut as a wildcard entrant at the 2021 Astana Open, losing to eventual champion Alison Van Uytvanck in the first round.

In 2023, Kulambayeva competed with the Kazakhstani team in the United Cup and in the Billie Jean King Cup. Teaming up with Alina Charaeva, she reached her first WTA Tour final in doubles at the 2026 Iași Open, losing to third seeds Anastasia Dețiuc and Irina Khromacheva in a deciding champions' tiebreak.

== WTA Tour finals ==
=== Doubles: 1 (runner-up) ===
Legend WTA 250 (0–1)	Finals by surface Clay (0–1)

Result	W–L	Date	Tournament	Tier	Surface	Partner	Opponents	Score
Loss	0–1	Jul 2026	Iași Open, Romania	WTA 250	Clay	(Armenia) Alina Charaeva	(Czech Republic) Anastasia Dețiuc; Irina Khromacheva	6–4, 2–6, [5–10]

== WTA 125 finals ==
=== Doubles: 4 (titles) ===
Result	W–L	Date	Tournament	Surface	Partner	Opponents	Score
Win	1–0	Sep 2025	Huzhou Open, China	Clay	(Slovenia) Veronika Erjavec	(Japan) Momoko Kobori (Japan) Ayano Shimizu	6–4, 6–2
Win	2–0	Sep 2026	Caldas da Rainha Ladies Open, Portugal	Hard	(Australia) Gabriella Da Silva-Fick	(Australia) Elena Micic (India) Rutuja Bhosale	3–6, 7–6^{(5)}, [10–7]
Win	3–0	Nov 2026	Cundinamarca Open, Colombia	Clay	(Slovenia) Veronika Erjavec	(Czech Republic) Laura Samson (Slovenia) Tamara Zidanšek	5–7, 6–2, [14–12]
Win	4–0	Nov 2026	Copa Colina, Chile	Clay	(Slovenia) Veronika Erjavec	(Ukraine) Valeriya Strakhova; Anastasia Tikhonova	6–4, 6–3

== ITF Circuit finals ==
=== Singles: 12 (7 titles, 5 runner-ups) ===
Legend W25/35 tournaments (0–2) W15 tournaments (7–3)	Finals by surface Clay (7–5)

Result	W–L	Date	Tournament	Tier	Surface	Opponent	Score
Loss	0–1	Sep 2018	ITF Shymkent, Kazakhstan	W15	Clay	(Russia) Daria Lodikova	6–7^{(5)}, 4–6
Finalist (Note: The match was suspended at 2–0 and not finished because of rain.)	–NP-	Jan 2019	ITF Antalya, Turkey	W15	Clay	(Turkey) İpek Öz	2–0* canc.
Win	1–1	Sep 2019	ITF Anning, China	W15	Clay	(Croatia) Oleksandra Oliynykova	6–3, 7–5
Loss	1–2	Apr 2021	ITF Cairo, Egypt	W15	Clay	(Russia) Elina Avanesyan	6–3, 4–6, 4–6
Win	2–2	May 2021	ITF Shymkent, Kazakhstan	W15	Clay	(Belarus) Kristina Dmitruk	7–5, 6–0
Loss	2–3	Apr 2022	ITF Shymkent, Kazakhstan	W15	Clay	(Russia) Tatiana Prozorova	2–6, 4–6
Loss	2–4	Sep 2022	ITF Almaty, Kazakhstan	W25	Clay	(Russia) Ekaterina Maklakova	4–6, 6–1, 4–6
Win	3–4	Mar 2023	ITF Antalya, Turkey	W15	Clay	(Czech Republic) Denisa Hindová	6–1, 6–3
Win	4–4	May 2023	ITF Kuršumlijska Banja, Serbia	W15	Clay	(Greece) Eleni Christofi	6–3, 6–1
Win	5–4	Jul 2024	ITF Kuršumlijska Banja, Serbia	W15	Clay	(Sweden) Lisa Zaar	2–6, 6–4, 6–2
Loss	5–5	Sep 2024	ITF Punta Cana, Dominican Republic	W35	Clay	(United States) Karina Miller	5–7, 7–5, 1–6
Win	6–5	Jun 2025	ITF Kuršumlijska Banja, Serbia	W15	Clay	(Serbia) Draginja Vuković	6–4, 7–6^{(5)}
Win	7–5	Mar 2026	ITF Nagpur, India	W15	Clay	(India) Sonal Patil	6–1, 6–3

=== Doubles: 60 (40 titles, 20 runner-ups) ===
Legend W100 tournaments (3–0) W60/75 tournaments (3–4) W40/50 tournaments (6–4) W25/35 tournaments (11–5) W10/15 tournaments (17–7)	Finals by surface Hard (8–3) Clay (32–17)

Result	W–L	Date	Tournament	Tier	Surface	Partner	Opponents	Score
Loss	0–1	Sep 2016	ITF Shymkent, Kazakhstan	W10	Clay	(Russia) Anna Iakovleva	(Russia) Yanina Darishina (Russia) Daria Lodikova	3–6, 3–6
Loss	0–2	Oct 2016	ITF Shymkent, Kazakhstan	W10	Clay	(Russia) Anna Ukolova	(Russia) Ulyana Ayzatulina (Russia) Margarita Lazareva	2–6, 3–6
Loss	0–3	Sep 2017	ITF Shymkent, Kazakhstan	W15	Clay	(Kazakhstan) Dariya Detkovskaya	(Kyrgyzstan) Ksenia Palkina (Croatia) Mariana Dražić	5–7, 6–3, [8–10]
Loss	0–4	Sep 2017	ITF Shymkent, Kazakhstan	W15	Clay	(Kazakhstan) Dariya Detkovskaya	(Kyrgyzstan) Ksenia Palkina (Croatia) Mariana Dražić	5–7, 2–6
Win	1–4	Apr 2018	ITF Shymkent, Kazakhstan	W15	Clay	(Kazakhstan) Dariya Detkovskaya	(Russia) Polina Bakhmutkina (Russia) Daria Lodikova	7–5, 6–4
Loss	1–5	Apr 2019	ITF Sharm El Sheikh, Egypt	W15	Hard	(Slovakia) Katarína Kužmová	(Thailand) Thasaporn Naklo (Thailand) Mananchaya Sawangkaew	3–6, 5–7
Loss	1–6	Apr 2019	ITF Shymkent, Kazakhstan	W15	Clay	(Kazakhstan) Dariya Detkovskaya	(Serbia) Tamara Čurović (Russia) Anastasia Zakharova	5–7, 2–6
Loss	1–7	May 2019	ITF Heraklion, Greece	W15	Clay	(Hungary) Vanda Lukács	(Israel) Maya Tahan (Serbia) Draginja Vuković	w/o
Win	2–7	Sep 2019	ITF Anning, China	W15	Clay	(China) Ma Yexin	(China) Liu Siqi (China) Sheng Yuqi	6–4, 6–3
Win	3–7	Jan 2020	ITF Antalya, Turkey	W15	Clay	(China) Ma Yexin	(Russia) Ksenia Laskutova (Russia) Anna Ureke	6–4, 6–2
Win	4–7	Jan 2020	ITF Antalya, Turkey	W15	Clay	(China) Ma Yexin	(Japan) Ayaka Okuno (Germany) Julyette Steur	6–4, 1–6, [10–4]
Win	5–7	Oct 2020	ITF Sharm El Sheikh, Egypt	W15	Hard	(Kazakhstan) Gozal Ainitdinova	(Kazakhstan) Yekaterina Dmitrichenko (Kazakhstan) Kamila Kerimbayeva	6–1, 2–6, [12–10]
Win	6–7	Apr 2021	ITF Shymkent, Kazakhstan	W15	Clay	(Kazakhstan) Gozal Ainitdinova	(Ukraine) Viktoriia Dema (Russia) Anna Ureke	6–2, 5–7, [10–7]
Win	7–7	Apr 2021	ITF Cairo, Egypt	W15	Clay	(Italy) Nicole Fossa Huergo	(Russia) Elina Avanesyan (Romania) Oana Gavrilă	6–3, 6–2
Win	8–7	May 2021	ITF Cairo, Egypt	W15	Clay	(Romania) Oana Gavrilă	(Egypt) Yasmin Ezzat (United States) Clervie Ngounoue	6–4, 6–0
Win	9–7	May 2021	ITF Shymkent, Kazakhstan	W15	Clay	(Poland) Martyna Kubka	(Russia) Ekaterina Reyngold (Russia) Ekaterina Shalimova	7–6^{(3)}, 5–7, [10–8]
Win	10–7	May 2021	ITF Shymkent, Kazakhstan	W15	Clay	(Poland) Martyna Kubka	(Russia) Ekaterina Reyngold (Russia) Ekaterina Shalimova	6–4, 6–4
Win	11–7	Aug 2021	ITF Cairo, Egypt	W15	Clay	(Russia) Anastasia Sukhotina	(Ecuador) Mell Reasco (Slovakia) Alica Rusová	6–0, 6–0
Win	12–7	Aug 2021	ITF Cairo, Egypt	W15	Clay	(Egypt) Sandra Samir	(Colombia) María Paulina Pérez (Ecuador) Mell Reasco	7–5, 6–3
Win	13–7	Oct 2021	ITF Karaganda, Kazakhstan	W25	Hard (i)	(Poland) Martyna Kubka	(Serbia) Tamara Čurović (Estonia) Elena Malõgina	7–5, 6–4
Win	14–7	Dec 2021	ITF Navi Mumbai, India	W25	Hard	(Latvia) Diāna Marcinkēviča	(Kazakhstan) Anna Danilina (Ukraine) Valeriya Strakhova	6–3, 4–6, [10–6]
Win	15–7	Apr 2022	ITF Shymkent, Kazakhstan	W15	Clay	Anastasia Sukhotina	Ekaterina Maklakova; Ksenia Zaytseva	6–1, 6–4
Win	16–7	Apr 2022	ITF Shymkent, Kazakhstan	W15	Clay	(Netherlands) Stéphanie Visscher	(Kazakhstan) Zhanel Rustemova (Kazakhstan) Aruzhan Sagandikova	7–6^{(4)}, 6–1
Loss	16–8	Jun 2022	ITF Brescia, Italy	W60	Clay	(Latvia) Diāna Marcinkēviča	(Italy) Nuria Brancaccio (Italy) Lisa Pigato	4–6, 1–6
Win	17–8	Jun 2022	ITF Prokuplje, Serbia	W25	Clay	(India) Prarthana Thombare	(Spain) Leyre Romero Gormaz (Croatia) Tara Würth	w/o
Loss	17–9	Aug 2022	ITF Ust-Kamenogorsk, Kazakhstan	W25	Hard	(Russia) Ekaterina Kazionova	(Russia) Ekaterina Maklakova (Russia) Aleksandra Pospelova	6–7^{(5)}, 1–6
Win	18–9	Sep 2022	ITF Almaty, Kazakhstan	W25	Clay	(Russia) Ekaterina Yashina	(Russia) Amina Anshba (Russia) Sofya Lansere	7–6^{(4)}, 5–7, [10–8]
Win	19–9	Sep 2022	ITF Santa Margherita di Pula, Italy	W25	Clay	(Latvia) Darja Semeņistaja	(China) Lu Jiajing (Bosnia and Herzegovina) Anita Wagner	6–2, 6–2
Loss	19–10	Jan 2023	Pune Open, India	W40	Hard	(Kazakhstan) Gozal Ainitdinova	(India) Ankita Raina (India) Prarthana Thombare	6–4, 5–7, [8–10]
Win	20–10	Apr 2023	ITF Antalya, Turkey	W15	Clay	(Russia) Daria Lodikova	(Sweden) Jacqueline Cabaj Awad (Greece) Martha Matoula	6–1, 6–4
Loss	20–11	Apr 2023	ITF Santa Margherita di Pula, Italy	W25	Clay	(Greece) Sapfo Sakellaridi	(Croatia) Mariana Dražić (Russia) Anastasia Gasanova	5–7, 4–6
Loss	20–12	May 2023	ITF Båstad, Sweden	W25	Clay	(Poland) Martyna Kubka	(Switzerland) Jenny Dürst (Sweden) Fanny Östlund	4–6, 7–6^{(3)}, [7–10]
Win	21–12	May 2023	ITF Kursumlijska Banja, Serbia	W25	Clay	(Poland) Martyna Kubka	Alexandra Azarko; Victoria Borodulina	6–3, 6–3
Win	22–12	Jul 2023	Internazionale di Roma, Italy	W60	Clay	(Russia) Yuliya Hatouka	(Colombia) María Paulina Pérez (Colombia) Yuliana Lizarazo	6–4, 6–4
Loss	22–13	Jul 2023	ITS Cup, Czech Republic	W60	Clay	(Latvia) Darja Semeņistaja	(Czech Republic) Magdaléna Smékalová (Czech Republic) Tereza Valentová	2–6, 2–6
Loss	22–14	Aug 2023	Kunming Open, China	W40	Clay	(Thailand) Lanlana Tararudee	(China) Guo Hanyu (China) Jiang Xinyu	2–6, 0–6
Win	23–14	Sep 2023	Prague Open, Czech Republic	W60	Clay	(Poland) Martyna Kubka	(Italy) Angelica Moratelli (Italy) Camilla Rosatello	7–6^{(3)}, 6–4
Win	24–14	Sep 2023	ITF Skopje, North Macedonia	W40	Clay	(Lithuania) Justina Mikulskytė	(Japan) Rina Saigo (Japan) Yukina Saigo	6–3, 6–4
Win	25–14	Oct 2023	ITF Cherbourg, France	W25+H	Hard (i)	(Poland) Martyna Kubka	(France) Yasmine Mansouri (Belgium) Lara Salden	6–0, 6–3
Win	26–14	Nov 2023	ITF Monastir, Tunisia	W25	Hard	(China) Gao Xinyu	(Russia) Aliona Falei (Russia) Polina Iatcenko	6–0, 2–6, [10–7]
Win	27–14	Jan 2024	ITF Nonthaburi, Thailand	W50	Hard	(Greece) Sapfo Sakellaridi	(Thailand) Lanlana Tararudee (Chinese Taipei) Tsao Chia-yi	w/o
Win	28–14	Mar 2024	ITF Gurugram, India	W35	Hard	(India) Ankita Raina	(Sweden) Jacqueline Cabaj Awad (Lithuania) Justina Mikulskytė	6–4, 6–2
Win	29–14	Apr 2024	ITF Hammamet, Tunisia	W35	Clay	(Netherlands) Jasmijn Gimbrère	(Australia) Kaylah McPhee (Russia) Ksenia Zaytseva	6–4, 7–5
Win	30–14	Aug 2024	ITF Bytom, Poland	W50	Clay	(Italy) Nicole Fossa Huergo	(Ukraine) Maryna Kolb (Ukraine) Nadiia Kolb	7–6^{(6)}, 6–2
Loss	30–15	Sep 2024	ITF Punta Cana, Dominican Republic	W35	Clay	(India) Sahaja Yamalapalli	(Canada) Ariana Arseneault (Canada) Kayla Cross	1–6, 7–5, [8–10]
Win	31–15	Sep 2024	ITF San Miguel de Tucumán, Argentina	W50	Clay	(Italy) Nicole Fossa Huergo	(Colombia) María Paulina Pérez (Italy) Aurora Zantedeschi	6–3, 4–6, [10–7]
Loss	31–16	Sep 2024	ITF Pilar, Argentina	W50	Clay	(Italy) Nicole Fossa Huergo	(Brazil) Carolina Alves (Argentina) Julia Riera	4–6, 5–7
Win	32–16	Sep 2024	Internacional de São Paulo, Brazil	W75	Clay	(Italy) Nicole Fossa Huergo	(Greece) Eleni Christofi (Italy) Aurora Zantedeschi	3–6, 6–2, [10–4]
Win	33–16	Nov 2024	ITF Lousada, Portugal	W35	Hard (i)	Yuliya Hatouka	Polina Iatcenko (Belgium) Hanne Vandewinkel	6–3, 1–6, [10–4]
Loss	33–17	Feb 2025	ITF Antalya, Turkey	W35	Clay	(Italy) Nicole Fossa Huergo	(Chinese Taipei) Li Yu-yun (China) Li Zongyu	2–6, 6–2, [6–10]
Win	34–17	Apr 2025	Open Villa de Madrid, Spain	W100	Clay	(Italy) Nicole Fossa Huergo	(Spain) Marina Bassols Ribera (Spain) Andrea Lázaro García	7–6^{(7)}, 6–7^{(4)}, [10–7]
Win	35–17	Apr 2025	Wiesbaden Open, Germany	W100	Clay	(Latvia) Darja Semeņistaja	(Czech Republic) Jesika Malečková (Czech Republic) Miriam Škoch	4–6, 6–3, [11–9]
Loss	35–18	May 2025	ITF Kuršumlijska Banja, Serbia	W75	Clay	(United Kingdom) Freya Christie	(Turkey) Ayla Aksu (Czech Republic) Anna Sisková	4–6, 2–6
Win	36–18	Mar 2026	ITF Nagpur, India	W15	Clay	Ekaterina Yashina	Ksenia Laskutova; Elina Nepliy	5–7, 6–4, [10–6]
Win	37–18	Mar 2026	ITF Ch. Sambhaji Nagar, India	W15	Clay	Ekaterina Yashina	(Germany) Anastasia Kuparev (Uzbekistan) Sevil Yuldasheva	6–1, 6–4
Win	38–18	Apr 2026	ITF Batou, China	W50	Clay (i)	Ekaterina Reyngold	(Italy) Diletta Cherubini (China) Yuan Chengyiyi	6–1, 6–1
Loss	38–19	May 2026	ITF Kuršumlijska Banja, Serbia	W75	Clay	(Sweden) Lisa Zaar	(Czech Republic) Michaela Bayerlová (Serbia) Elena Milovanović	3–6, 4–6
Win	39–19	June 2026	ITF Haskovo, Bulgaria	W50	Clay	(Ukraine) Valeriya Strakhova	(Greece) Martha Matoula (United States) Hibah Shaikh	6–0, 6–4
Loss	39–20	June 2026	ITF Gdańsk, Poland	W50	Clay	(Hungary) Amarissa Tóth	(Poland) Weronika Falkowska (Spain) Georgina García Pérez	6–3, 5–7, [9–11]
Win	40–20	Jul 2026	ITF Gran Canaria, Spain	W100	Clay	(Czech Republic) Anna Sisková	(Czech Republic) Dominika Šalková (Sweden) Lisa Zaar	6–3, 7–6^{(3)}
