= Ana Candiotto =

Brazilian tennis player

- Country (sports): Brazil
- Born: 19 April 2004 (age 22) Jundiaí, São Paulo, Brazil
- Plays: Right (two-handed backhand)
- Prize money: $95,914

Singles
- Career record: 134–136
- Career titles: 2 ITF
- Highest ranking: No. 456 (20 October 2025)
- Current ranking: No. 558 (16 November 2026)

Doubles
- Career record: 172–90
- Career titles: 1 WTA 125, 19 ITF
- Highest ranking: No. 224 (2 February 2026)
- Current ranking: No. 338 (16 November 2026)

Team competitions
- Fed Cup: 2–0
Medal record
Women's tennis
Representing Brazil
Junior Pan American Games
Bronze medal – third place	2021 Cali-Valle	Girls' doubles
- Last updated on: 19 November 2026.

Ana Candiotto (born 19 April 2004) is a Brazilian professional tennis player. She has career-high rankings by the WTA of 456 in singles and 224 in doubles. Candiotto has won one WTA 125 doubles title, 19 ITF doubles titles and two ITF singles titles.

== Career ==
=== 2020: Early career, junior debut ===
In 2020, she received a wildcard for the girls' singles event at the 2020 French Open, but lost in the first round of singles to Matilda Mutavdzic.

=== 2022: South American Games bronze medal; first professional title ===
In 2022, she competed in the girls' singles event at the 2022 Australian Open, losing in the first round to Tereza Valentová In the girls' doubles event, she partnered with Li Yu-yun but was defeated in the first round by Charlotte Kempenaers-Pocz and Taylah Preston.

At the Wimbledon Championships, she entered the girls' singles main draw as a lucky loser, but lost her opening match to the top seed and eventual champion, Liv Hovde, in straight sets.

In October, in the women's singles event at the 2022 South American Games, she reached the round of 16 defeating Agustina Cuestas. However, she was eliminated in the next round by María Herazo González. In the doubles competition, she partnered with Juliana Munhoz and won bronze medal by defeatin the Paraguayans Leyla Risso and Paulina Franco Martinessi.

In November, she was awarded a wildcard for the main draw of the women's singles draw of the Aberto da República, a W60 tournament.

=== 2023 ===
Partnering with Russian player Daria Lodikova in Antalya, Turkiye, she won doubles titles in a W15 event in February and in March.

At the W25 São Paulo Tennis Classic held in Mogi das Cruzes, Candiotto won her eighth doubles title of the season.

=== 2024: WTA 125 debut and first win, maiden pro singles title ===
In May, Candiotto played in Spain and won the W35 event in Monzón.

In November, Candiotto was invited to train as sparring partner to the Brazil Billie Jean King Cup team.

At the WTA 125 tournament MundoTenis Open held in Florianópolis, she was given a wildcard to participate alongside Luiza Fullana.

In December 15th, she won her first professional singles title at the W15 São Paulo Tennis Classic, defeating Camila Romero in the final.

=== 2025: First WTA 125 doubles title, WTA Tour and BJK Cup debuts ===
In March, Candiotto was called by the Brazilian Tennis Confederation to participate at the BJK Cup in April and join the Time Brasil BRB for the first time in her career.

Candiotto made her WTA Tour debut as a wildcard entrant at the 2025 SP Open where she defeated Valeriya Strakhova, recording her first singles WTA Tour match win.

In October, Candiotto won the doubles title of the W35 tournament São Paulo Torneio Internacional de Tênis Feminino in Brazil. She played alongside fellow Brazilian Naná Silva and defeated the duo of Argentinian Jazmín Ortenzi and Colombian María Paulina Pérez in the final. This was her 13th ITF doubles title.

In November, Candiotto played at a WTA 125 Cali Open in Colombia, partnering with fellow Brazilian Laura Pigossi and winning the final in straight sets against Ekaterine Gorgodze and Nicole Fossa Huergo. This was her first doubles title at the WTA 125-level.

In December, Candiotto won her fourth doubles title of the year in Lima, Peru on a W15 tournament. In the final, Candiotto and Argentinian Luciana Moyano defeated Julia Konishi and Jamaican Najah Dawson.

=== 2026: First BJK Cup matches ===
In April 2026, Candiotto represented Brazil in the BJK Cup in Ibagué, Colombia for the Americas Zone Group I stage of the tournament. Although she had previously been called up to the team, this was her first match played in the competition. Her debut match came in doubles, where she partnered with Victoria Barros to defeat the Chilean pair of Antonia Vergara Rivera and Jimar Gonzalez in straight sets, helping Brazil secure a 3–0 victory.

On the third day of competition Brazil faced Peru. Candiotto played on the doubles match once again, alongside Victoria Luiza Barros. The duo won in two sets, against Dana Guzmán and Romina Ccuno, helping Brazil to win the by 3–0. With that result, Brazil secured the first place on the group and would face Mexico on the decisive tie.

Candiotto did not play against Mexico and with wins by Naná Silva and Gabriela Cé, the team secured the victory over Mexico by 2–0 and advanced to the playoffs of the competition.

== WTA 125 finals ==
=== Doubles: 1 (title) ===
Result	W–L	Date	Tournament	Surface	Partner	Opponents	Score
Win	1–0	Nov 2025	Cali Open, Colombia	Clay	(Brazil) Laura Pigossi	(Italy) Nicole Fossa Huergo (Georgia (country)) Ekaterine Gorgodze	6–3, 6–1

== ITF Circuit finals ==
=== Singles: 4 (2 titles, 2 runner-ups) ===
Legend
W15 tournaments (2–2)

Result	W–L	Date	Tournament	Tier	Surface	Opponent	Score
Loss	0–1	May 2023	ITF Curitiba, Brazil	W15	Clay	(Argentina) Jazmín Ortenzi	3–6, 3–6
Win	1–1	Dec 2024	ITF Mogi das Cruzes, Brazil	W15	Clay	(Ecuador) Camila Romero	6–0, 6–3
Win	2–1	Jun 2026	ITF Asunción, Paraguay	W15	Clay	(Argentina) Luciana Moyano	6–3, 7–6^{(5)}
Loss	2–2	Aug 2026	ITF Porto Velho, Brazil	W15	Hard	(Mexico) Ana Sofía Sánchez	3–6, 3–6

=== Doubles: 28 (19 titles, 9 runner-ups) ===
Legend
W40/50 tournaments (0–1)
W25/35 tournaments (5–3)
W15 tournaments (14–5)

Result	W–L	Date	Tournament	Tier	Surface	Partner	Opponents	Score
Win	1–0	Nov 2022	ITF Mar del Plata, Argentina	W15	Clay	(Peru) Anastasia Iamachkine	(Argentina) Luciana Blatter (Argentina) Josefina Estévez	6–3, 6–3
Win	2–0	Feb 2023	ITF Antalya, Turkiye	W15	Clay	Daria Lodikova	(Italy) Alessandra Mazzola (Italy) Sofia Rocchetti	6–3, 6–2
Win	3–0	Feb 2023	ITF Antalya, Turkiye	W15	Clay	(Romania) Simona Ogescu	(Japan) Miho Kuramochi (Serbia) Bojana Marinković	6–3, 6–4
Win	4–0	Mar 2023	ITF Antalya, Turkiye	W15	Clay	(Germany) Natalia Siedliska	(Ukraine) Viktoriia Dema (Uzbekistan) Sevil Yuldasheva	6–3, 7–5
Win	5–0	Mar 2023	ITF Antalya, Turkiye	W15	Clay	Daria Lodikova	(Italy) Virginia Ferrara (Italy) Giorgia Pedone	6–4, 6–4
Loss	5–1	Apr 2023	ITF Guayaquil, Ecuador	W25	Clay	(Brazil) Rebeca Pereira	(United States) Jessie Aney (United States) Sofia Sewing	1–6, 2–6
Win	6–1	May 2023	ITF Curitiba, Brazil	W15	Clay	(Brazil) Rebeca Pereira	(United States) Sabastiani Leon (Argentina) Jazmín Ortenzi	7–5, 3–6, [10–3]
Loss	6–2	Jun 2023	ITF Kuršumlijska Banja, Serbia	W15	Clay	(Peru) Anastasia Iamachkine	(Greece) Eleni Christofi (Serbia) Natalija Senić	6–7^{(5)}, 3–6
Loss	6–3	Aug 2023	ITF Arequipa, Peru	W40	Clay	(Peru) Anastasia Iamachkine	(Germany) Natalia Siedliska (Bolivia) Noelia Zeballos	7–5, 2–6, [8–10]
Win	7–3	Nov 2023	ITF Monastir, Tunisia	W15	Hard	(Czech Republic) Amélie Šmejkalová	(Sweden) Julita Saner (Germany) Marie Vogt	7–5, 6–3
Win	8–3	Nov 2023	ITF Monastir, Tunisia	W15	Hard	(Romania) Andreea Prisăcariu	(France) Aminata Sall (France) Marie Villet	6–1, 6–0
Win	9–3	Dec 2023	ITF Mogi das Cruzes, Brazil	W25	Clay	(Argentina) Melany Krywoj	(Italy) Nicole Fossa Huergo (Lithuania) Justina Mikulskytė	6–1, 6–0
Loss	9–4	Feb 2024	ITF Tucuman, Argentina	W15	Clay	(Bolivia) Noelia Zeballos	(Argentina) Justina María González (Ecuador) Camila Romero	6–4, 6–7^{(6)}, [8–10]
Win	10–4	May 2024	Torneo Conchita Martínez, Spain	W35	Hard	(France) Tiphanie Lemaître	(Austria) Tamira Paszek (Switzerland) Valentina Ryser	2–6, 6–0, [10–5]
Loss	10–5	Jun 2024	ITF Madrid, Spain	W15	Clay	(Peru) Anastasia Iamachkine	(United Kingdom) Holly Hutchinson (United Kingdom) Ella McDonald	4–6, 1–6
Win	11–5	Oct 2024	ITF Luque, Paraguay	W15	Clay	(Brazil) Camilla Bossi	(Argentina) Luciana Moyano (Ecuador) Camila Romero	6–4, 5–7, [10–7]
Loss	11–6	Nov 2024	ITF Ribeirão Preto, Brazil	W15	Clay	(Brazil) Camilla Bossi	(Peru) Romina Ccuno (Chile) Fernanda Labraña	1–6, 6–2, [7–10]
Loss	11–7	May 2025	ITF Kuršumlijska Banja, Serbia	W15	Clay	(Argentina) Justina Maria Gonzalez	(Switzerland) Alina Granwehr (Netherlands) Madelief Hageman	7–5, 3–6, [7–10]
Loss	11–8	May 2025	ITF Bol, Croatia	W35	Clay	Daria Lodikova	(Slovakia) Katarína Kužmová (Netherlands) Stéphanie Visscher	4–6, 6–1, [9–11]
Win	12–8	May 2025	ITF Bol, Croatia	W35	Clay	(Romania) Ilinca Amariei	(Croatia) Mariana Dražić; Anastasia Gasanova	7–6^{(7)}, 6–2
Loss	12–9	Aug 2025	ITF Chacabuco, Argentina	W35	Clay	(Argentina) Justina María González	(Argentina) Luisina Giovannini (Mexico) Marian Gómez Pezuela Cano	6–3, 6–7^{(5)}, [5–10]
Win	13–9	Oct 2025	ITF São Paulo, Brazil	W35	Clay	(Brazil) Naná Silva	(Argentina) Jazmín Ortenzi (Colombia) María Paulina Pérez	6–4, 6–2
Win	14–9	Dec 2025	ITF Lima, Peru	W15	Clay	(Argentina) Luciana Moyano	(Jamaica) Najah Dawson (Brazil) Júlia Camargo Silva	6–4, 6–1
Win	15–9	Mar 2026	ITF Santiago, Chile	W15	Clay	(Chile) Antonia Vergara Rivera	(Peru) Romina Ccuno (Chile) Fernanda Labraña	6–1, 6–3
Win	16–9	Jun 2026	ITF Luque, Paraguay	W15	Clay	(Argentina) Justina María González	(Argentina) Luciana Moyano (Ecuador) Camila Romero	7–6^{(4)}, 7–5
Win	17–9	Jul 2026	ITF Rio Claro, Brazil	W15	Clay	(Brazil) Luiza Fullana	(Brazil) Júlia Konishi Camargo Silva (Brazil) Rebeca Pereira	6–4, 7–6^{(5)}
Win	18–9	Aug 2026	ITF Campos do Jordão, Brazil	W15	Hard	(China) Mi Lan	(Brazil) Luiza Fullana (Brazil) Marjorie Souza	6–0, 7–5
Win	19–9	Aug 2026	ITF Barueri, Brazil	W35	Hard	(Venezuela) Sofía Cabezas Domínguez	(Mexico) María Fernanda Navarro Oliva (Ecuador) Camila Romero	6–4, 6–2
