= Nicole Fossa Huergo =

Italian-born Argentine tennis player (born 1995)

- Country (sports): Argentina (Nov 2025–); Italy (until 2025)
- Born: 25 May 1995 (age 31) Isernia, Italy
- Plays: Right-handed
- Prize money: $268,577

Singles
- Career record: 254–192
- Career titles: 1 ITF
- Highest ranking: No. 250 (15 September 2025)
- Current ranking: No. 1,163 (26 October 2026)

Doubles
- Career record: 194–126
- Career titles: 4 WTA 125, 12 ITF
- Highest ranking: No. 72 (21 September 2026)
- Current ranking: No. 73 (26 October 2026)

Grand Slam doubles results
- French Open: 2R (2026)
- Wimbledon: 2R (2026)
- US Open: 2R (2026)
- Last updated on: 26 October 2026.

Nicole Fossa Huergo (born 26 May 1995) is an Italian-born Argentine professional tennis player. She has career-high WTA rankings of 250 in singles, reached on 15 September 2025, and No. 72 in doubles, achieved on 21 September 2026. She has won four WTA 125 doubles titles, along with one singles and 12 doubles titles on the ITF Women's World Tennis Tour.

== Career ==
=== College ===
Fossa Huergo played college tennis in the United States for the Arizona State University's Arizona State Sun Devils.

=== Professional ===
==== 2024: Doubles success ====
In August, Fossa Huergo won her first major ITF title at the W50 Śląskie Open in Bytom in the doubles draw, partnering Zhibek Kulambayeva.

Playing alongside Valeriya Strakhova, she reached her first WTA 125 doubles final at the MundoTenis Open in December, losing to Maja Chwalińska and Laura Pigossi.

==== 2025: WTA Tour debut, first WTA 125 doubles title ====
Fossa Huergo began 2025 by winning her first professional singles title at the W35 event in Buenos Aires in January, she also lifted the doubles trophy at the same event.

In April she captured a W100 doubles title at the Open Villa de Madrid with Kulambayeva, defeating Marina Bassols Ribera and Andrea Lázaro García in the final.

Fossa Huergo made her WTA Tour main-draw debut in May at the Rabat Grand Prix as a lucky loser but was defeated by top seed Arantxa Rus in the first round in three sets.

Again as a lucky loser, she entered the main draw at the Hamburg Open in July losing to Leyre Romero Gormaz in the first round.

After making it through qualifying, Fossa Huergo made her first WTA 500 main-draw appearance at the Guadalajara Open in September, losing to wildcard entrant Nikola Bartůňková in the first round.

In October, she teamed with Ekaterine Gorgodze to win her first WTA 125 doubles title at the Internazionali di Calabria, defeating Federica Urgesi and Aurora Zantedeschi in the final which went to a champions tiebreak.

== WTA 125 finals ==
=== Doubles: 8 (4 titles, 4 runner-ups) ===
Result	W–L	Date	Tournament	Surface	Partner	Opponents	Score
Loss	0–1	Dec 2024	Florianópolis Open, Brazil	Clay	(Ukraine) Valeriya Strakhova	(Brazil) Laura Pigossi (Poland) Maja Chwalińska	6–7^{(3)}, 3–6
Win	1–1	Oct 2025	Internazionali di Calabria, Italy	Clay	(Georgia (country)) Ekaterine Gorgodze	(Italy) Federica Urgesi (Italy) Aurora Zantedeschi	3–6, 6–1, [10–4]
Loss	1–2	Nov 2025	Cali Open, Colombia	Clay	(Georgia (country)) Ekaterine Gorgodze	(Brazil) Ana Candiotto (Brazil) Laura Pigossi	3–6, 1–6
Loss	1–3	Nov 2025	Buenos Aires Open, Argentina	Clay	(Czech Republic) Laura Samson	(Spain) Alicia Herrero Liñana (Brazil) Laura Pigossi	2–6, 6–7^{(5)}
Loss	1–4	Feb 2026	Mumbai Open, India	Hard	(Thailand) Mananchaya Sawangkaew	Elena Pridankina; Polina Iatcenko	6–7^{(3)}, 6–1, [5–10]
Win	2–4	Mar 2026	Antalya Challenger, Turkiye	Clay	(France) Estelle Cascino	(Czech Republic) Jesika Malečková (Czech Republic) Miriam Škoch	7–5, 7–6^{(6)}
Win	3–4	Jul 2026	Contrexéville Open, France	Clay	(France) Estelle Cascino	(Spain) Yvonne Cavallé Reimers (Brazil) Laura Pigossi	6–7^{(3)}, 6–2, [10–6]
Win	4–4	Sep 2026	Montreux Ladies Open, Switzerland	Clay	(Czech Republic) Lucie Havlíčková	(France) Estelle Cascino (China) Feng Shuo	6–3, 6–7^{(4–7)}, [10–8]
Loss	4–5	Sep 2026	Internacional de Valencia, Spain	Clay	(Spain) Irene Burillo	(Slovenia) Dalila Jakupović (Switzerland) Naïma Karamoko	2–6, 3–6

== ITF Circuit finals ==
=== Singles: 5 (1 title, 4 runner-ups) ===
Legend
W35 tournaments
W15 tournaments

Result	W–L	Date	Tournament	Tier	Surface	Opponent	Score
Loss	0–1	Nov 2019	ITF Solarino, Italy	W15	Carpet	(Germany) Tayisiya Morderger	6–7^{(5)}, 7–6^{(7)}, 1–6
Loss	0–2	Aug 2021	ITF Chornomorsk, Ukraine	W15	Clay	(Latvia) Darja Semeņistaja	3–6, 2–6
Loss	0–3	Sep 2023	ITF Brașov, Romania	W15	Clay	(Ukraine) Alisa Baranovska	3–6, 3–6
Win	1–3	Oct 2024	ITF Santa Margherita di Pula, Italy	W35	Clay	(Italy) Federica Urgesi	6–0, 3–6, 6–2
Loss	1–4	Oct 2024	ITF Santa Margherita di Pula, Italy	W35	Clay	(Spain) Carlota Martínez Círez	4–6, 3–6

=== Doubles: 28 (12 titles, 16 runner-ups) ===
Legend
W100 tournaments
W75 tournaments
W50 tournaments
W25/35 tournaments
W15 tournaments

Result	W–L	Date	Tournament	Tier	Surface	Partner	Opponents	Score
Loss	0–1	Nov 2019	ITF Solarino, Italy	W15	Carpet	(United States) Emma Davis	(Germany) Tayisiya Morderger (Germany) Yana Morderger	2–6, 3–6
Loss	0–2	Jan 2020	ITF Antalya, Turkey	W15	Clay	(Russia) Vasilisa Aponasenko	(Croatia) Oleksandra Oliynykova (Greece) Sapfo Sakellaridi	2–6, 2–6
Win	1–2	Dec 2020	ITF Antalya, Turkey	W15	Clay	(Germany) Julia Kimmelmann	(Ukraine) Anastasiia Poplavska (Russia) Arina Solomatina	6–3, 6–3
Win	2–2	Apr 2021	ITF Cairo, Egypt	W15	Clay	(Kazakhstan) Zhibek Kulambayeva	(Russia) Elina Avanesyan (Romania) Oana Gavrilă	6–3, 6–2
Loss	2–3	May 2021	ITF Sibenik, Croatia	W15	Clay	(Bosnia and Herzegovina) Nefisa Berberović	(Croatia) Petra Marčinko (Hungary) Natália Szabanin	4–6, 6–3, [4–10]
Win	3–3	Jun 2021	ITF Banja Luka, Bosnia and Herzegovina	W15	Clay	(Serbia) Bojana Marinković	(Slovakia) Katarína Kužmová (Serbia) Elena Milovanović	6–2, 3–6, [10–8]
Win	4–3	Dec 2021	ITF Heraklion, Greece	W15	Clay	(United Kingdom) Lauryn John-Baptiste	(Russia) Valeriia Olianovskaia (Russia) Nina Olyanovskaya	7–5, 6–4
Loss	4–4	Feb 2022	ITF Tucumán, Argentina	W25	Hard	(Bolivia) Noelia Zeballos	(Argentina) María Carlé (Argentina) Julieta Lara Estable	6–3, 0–6, [7–10]
Loss	4–5	Feb 2022	ITF Guayaquil, Ecuador	W25	Hard	(Bolivia) Noelia Zeballos	(Venezuela) Andrea Gámiz (United States) Sofia Sewing	4–6, 5–7
Loss	4–6	Aug 2022	Verbier Open, Switzerland	W25	Clay	(Czech Republic) Michaela Bayerlová	(Japan) Erina Hayashi (Japan) Kanako Morisaki	2–6, 1–6
Loss	4–7	Jun 2023	ITF Yecla, Spain	W25	Hard	(United Kingdom) Matilda Mutavdzic	(Spain) Georgina García Pérez (Serbia) Katarina Kozarov	3–6, 4–6
Loss	4–8	Jul 2023	ITF Getxo, Spain	W25	Clay	(Bolivia) Noelia Zeballos	(Italy) Diletta Cherubini (Czech Republic) Anna Sisková	2–6, 4–6
Win	5–8	Jul 2023	ITF Parnu, Estonia	W25	Clay	(Germany) Luisa Meyer auf der Heide	(Croatia) Lucija Ćirić Bagarić (Switzerland) Jenny Dürst	7–5, 7–5
Win	6–8	Aug 2023	ITF Brașov, Romania	W15	Clay	(Serbia) Bojana Marinković	(Romania) Bianca Bărbulescu (Czech Republic) Linda Ševčíková	6–2, 6–4
Loss	6–9	Aug 2023	ITF Brașov, Romania	W15	Clay	(Bulgaria) Julia Stamatova	(Romania) Simona Ogescu (Czech Republic) Linda Ševčíková	6–7^{(8)}, 5–7
Loss	6–10	Sep 2023	ITF Luján, Argentina	W25	Clay	(Germany) Luisa Meyer auf der Heide	(Argentina) Martina Capurro Taborda (Chile) Fernanda Labraña	2–6, 5–7
Loss	6–11	Oct 2023	ITF Mendoza, Argentina	W25	Clay	(Germany) Luisa Meyer auf der Heide	(Peru) Romina Ccuno (Mexico) Victoria Rodríguez	3–6, 3–6
Loss	6–12	Dec 2023	ITF Mogi das Cruzes, Brazil	W25	Clay	(Lithuania) Justina Mikulskytė	(Brazil) Ana Candiotto (Argentina) Melany Krywoj	2–6, 6–1, [6–10]
Win	7–12	Jan 2024	ITF Buenos Aires, Argentina	W35	Clay	(Italy) Miriana Tona	(Argentina) Melany Krywoj (Bolivia) Noelia Zeballos	7–5, 6–3
Loss	7–13	Apr 2024	ITF Mosquera, Colombia	W35	Clay	(Italy) Miriana Tona	(Argentina) Jazmín Ortenzi (Mexico) María Portillo Ramírez	3–6, 2–6
Loss	7–14	Apr 2024	ITF Anapoima, Colombia	W35	Clay	(Italy) Miriana Tona	(Argentina) Jazmín Ortenzi (Mexico) María Portillo Ramírez	4–6, 3–6
Win	8–14	Aug 2024	ITF Bytom, Poland	W50	Clay	(Kazakhstan) Zhibek Kulambayeva	(Ukraine) Maryna Kolb (Ukraine) Nadiia Kolb	7–6^{(6)}, 6–2
Win	9–14	Sep 2024	ITF San Miguel de Tucumán, Argentina	W50	Clay	(Kazakhstan) Zhibek Kulambayeva	(Colombia) María Paulina Pérez (Italy) Aurora Zantedeschi	6–3, 4–6, [10–7]
Loss	9–15	Sep 2024	ITF Pilar, Argentina	W50	Clay	(Kazakhstan) Zhibek Kulambayeva	(Brazil) Carolina Alves (Argentina) Julia Riera	4–6, 5–7
Win	10–15	Sep 2024	São Paulo Internacional, Brazil	W75	Clay	(Kazakhstan) Zhibek Kulambayeva	(Greece) Eleni Christofi (Italy) Aurora Zantedeschi	3–6, 6–2, [10–4]
Win	11–15	Jan 2025	ITF Buenos Aires, Argentina	W35	Clay	(Italy) Anastasia Abbagnato	(Italy) Silvia Ambrosio (Italy) Verena Meliss	3–6, 6–4, [10–8]
Loss	11–16	Feb 2025	ITF Antalya, Turkiye	W35	Clay	(Kazakhstan) Zhibek Kulambayeva	(Chinese Taipei) Li Yu-yun (China) Li Zongyu	2–6, 6–2, [6–10]
Win	12–16	Apr 2025	Open Villa de Madrid, Spain	W100	Clay	(Kazakhstan) Zhibek Kulambayeva	(Spain) Marina Bassols Ribera (Spain) Andrea Lázaro García	7–6^{(7)}, 6–7^{(4)}, [10–7]
