= 2019 ITF Women's World Tennis Tour (October–December) =

Professional Tennis tournament

The 2019 ITF Women's World Tennis Tour is the 2019 edition of the second tier tour for women's professional tennis. It is organised by the International Tennis Federation and is a tier below the WTA Tour. The ITF Women's World Tennis Tour includes tournaments with prize money ranging from $15,000 up to $100,000.

== Key ==
Category
W100 tournaments
W80 tournaments
W60 tournaments
W25 tournaments
W15 tournaments

== Month ==
=== October ===
Week of	Tournament	Winner	Runners-up	Semifinalists	Quarterfinalists
October 7	Toowoomba, Australia; Hard; W25; Singles and Doubles Draws	(Australia) Maddison Inglis; 6–1, 4–6, 6–0	(Japan) Kyōka Okamura	(Japan) Haruna Arakawa (Australia) Olivia Rogowska	(Australia) Alison Bai (Australia) Alexandra Bozovic (Thailand) Nudnida Luangnam (Australia) Belinda Woolcock
October 7	Toowoomba, Australia; Hard; W25; Singles and Doubles Draws	(Australia) Abbie Myers (Australia) Belinda Woolcock; 7–6^{(7–2)}, 6–3	(Japan) Haruna Arakawa (Japan) Misaki Matsuda	(Japan) Haruna Arakawa (Australia) Olivia Rogowska	(Australia) Alison Bai (Australia) Alexandra Bozovic (Thailand) Nudnida Luangnam (Australia) Belinda Woolcock
October 7	Cherbourg-en-Cotentin, France; Hard (indoor); W25+H; Singles and Doubles Draws	(France) Océane Dodin; 6–4, 6–2	(France) Harmony Tan	(France) Myrtille Georges (France) Julie Gervais	(France) Lou Brouleau (Finland) Oona Orpana (Netherlands) Lesley Pattinama Kerkhove (United Kingdom) Samantha Murray
October 7	Cherbourg-en-Cotentin, France; Hard (indoor); W25+H; Singles and Doubles Draws	(United Kingdom) Naomi Broady (United Kingdom) Samantha Murray; 6–3, 6–2	(France) Myrtille Georges (Belgium) Kimberley Zimmermann	(France) Myrtille Georges (France) Julie Gervais	(France) Lou Brouleau (Finland) Oona Orpana (Netherlands) Lesley Pattinama Kerkhove (United Kingdom) Samantha Murray
October 7	Pula, Italy; Clay; W25; Singles and Doubles Draws	(Argentina) Nadia Podoroska; 7–6^{(7–5)}, 6–1	(Italy) Martina Trevisan	(Japan) Yuki Naito (Italy) Elisabetta Cocciaretto	(Italy) Corinna Dentoni (Russia) Amina Anshba (Italy) Angelica Moratelli (Turkey) Çağla Büyükakçay
October 7	Pula, Italy; Clay; W25; Singles and Doubles Draws	(Russia) Amina Anshba (Czech Republic) Anastasia Dețiuc; 7–5, 6–1	(Switzerland) Ylena In-Albon (Italy) Giorgia Marchetti	(Japan) Yuki Naito (Italy) Elisabetta Cocciaretto	(Italy) Corinna Dentoni (Russia) Amina Anshba (Italy) Angelica Moratelli (Turkey) Çağla Büyükakçay
October 7	Makinohara, Japan; Carpet; W25; Singles and Doubles Draws	(Spain) Paula Badosa; 7–5, 6–1	(Japan) Nagi Hanatani	(Japan) Mai Hontama (Japan) Risa Ushijima	(Japan) Erina Hayashi (Hong Kong) Eudice Chong (Japan) Junri Namigata (Japan) Sakura Hondo
October 7	Makinohara, Japan; Carpet; W25; Singles and Doubles Draws	(Hong Kong) Eudice Chong (Indonesia) Aldila Sutjiadi; 6–7^{(5–7)}, 7–6^{(7–5)}, [10–4]	(Japan) Erina Hayashi (Japan) Momoko Kobori	(Japan) Mai Hontama (Japan) Risa Ushijima	(Japan) Erina Hayashi (Hong Kong) Eudice Chong (Japan) Junri Namigata (Japan) Sakura Hondo
October 7	Lagos Open; Lagos, Nigeria; Hard; W25; Singles and Doubles Draws	(Burundi) Sada Nahimana; 2–6, 6–4, 6–3	(Brazil) Laura Pigossi	(Sweden) Fanny Östlund (India) Riya Bhatia	(Netherlands) Lexie Stevens (Slovenia) Nastja Kolar (India) Rutuja Bhosale (Egypt) Sandra Samir
October 7	Lagos Open; Lagos, Nigeria; Hard; W25; Singles and Doubles Draws	(India) Rutuja Bhosale (Brazil) Laura Pigossi; 4–6, 6–4, [10–7]	(Egypt) Sandra Samir (India) Prarthana Thombare	(Sweden) Fanny Östlund (India) Riya Bhatia	(Netherlands) Lexie Stevens (Slovenia) Nastja Kolar (India) Rutuja Bhosale (Egypt) Sandra Samir
October 7	Riba-roja de Túria, Spain; Clay; W25; Singles and Doubles Draws	(Spain) Andrea Lázaro García; 7–6^{(7–4)}, 7–5	(Belgium) Marie Benoît	(Spain) Georgina García Pérez (Spain) Lara Arruabarrena	(Romania) Patricia Maria Țig (Germany) Katharina Gerlach (Spain) Eva Guerrero Álvarez (Germany) Caroline Werner
October 7	Riba-roja de Túria, Spain; Clay; W25; Singles and Doubles Draws	(Spain) Lara Arruabarrena (Italy) Sara Errani; 3–6, 6–4, [10–8]	(Belgium) Marie Benoît (Romania) Ioana Loredana Roșca	(Spain) Georgina García Pérez (Spain) Lara Arruabarrena	(Romania) Patricia Maria Țig (Germany) Katharina Gerlach (Spain) Eva Guerrero Álvarez (Germany) Caroline Werner
October 7	Hilton Head Island, United States; Clay; W25; Singles and Doubles Draws	(Russia) Marina Melnikova; 6–3, 6–4	(United States) Elizabeth Halbauer	(Kazakhstan) Anna Danilina (Mexico) Renata Zarazúa	(Canada) Françoise Abanda (Hungary) Panna Udvardy (Switzerland) Nina Stadler (Japan) Mari Osaka
October 7	Hilton Head Island, United States; Clay; W25; Singles and Doubles Draws	(Kazakhstan) Anna Danilina (United States) Ingrid Neel; 6–3, 6–2	(United States) Katharine Fahey (United States) Elizabeth Halbauer	(Kazakhstan) Anna Danilina (Mexico) Renata Zarazúa	(Canada) Françoise Abanda (Hungary) Panna Udvardy (Switzerland) Nina Stadler (Japan) Mari Osaka
October 7	Claremont, United States; Hard; W25; Singles and Doubles Draws	(United Kingdom) Katie Swan; 6–1, 6–3	(Brazil) Thaisa Grana Pedretti	(Mexico) Giuliana Olmos (United States) Danielle Lao	(United States) Catherine Harrison (Canada) Leylah Annie Fernandez (Canada) Katherine Sebov (Sweden) Mirjam Björklund
October 7	Claremont, United States; Hard; W25; Singles and Doubles Draws	(United States) Jacqueline Cako (Russia) Angelina Gabueva; 6–3, 6–7^{(4–7)}, [10–4]	(United States) Hind Abdelouahid (United States) Alyssa Tobita	(Mexico) Giuliana Olmos (United States) Danielle Lao	(United States) Catherine Harrison (Canada) Leylah Annie Fernandez (Canada) Katherine Sebov (Sweden) Mirjam Björklund
October 7	Buenos Aires, Argentina; Clay; W15; Singles and Doubles Draws	(Argentina) Guillermina Naya; 6–3, 7–5	(Argentina) Jazmín Ortenzi	(Argentina) Sofía Luini (Brazil) Eduarda Piai	(Colombia) Jessica Plazas (Argentina) María del Rosario Vázquez (Argentina) Eugenia Ganga (Italy) Andrea Agostina Farulla Di Palma
October 7	Buenos Aires, Argentina; Clay; W15; Singles and Doubles Draws	(Argentina) Candela Bugnon (Argentina) Guillermina Naya; 7–6^{(7–4)}, 6–4	(Argentina) Eugenia Ganga (Argentina) Sofía Luini	(Argentina) Sofía Luini (Brazil) Eduarda Piai	(Colombia) Jessica Plazas (Argentina) María del Rosario Vázquez (Argentina) Eugenia Ganga (Italy) Andrea Agostina Farulla Di Palma
October 7	Sharm El Sheikh, Egypt; Hard; W15; Singles and Doubles Draws	(Lithuania) Justina Mikulskytė; 3–6, 6–4, 6–3	(Switzerland) Valentina Ryser	(United States) Dasha Ivanova (Netherlands) Lian Tran	(Poland) Stefania Rogozińska Dzik (Czech Republic) Martina Přádová (Venezuela) Nadia Echeverría Alam (Belgium) Victoria Kalaitzis
October 7	Sharm El Sheikh, Egypt; Hard; W15; Singles and Doubles Draws	(United States) Dasha Ivanova (Lithuania) Justina Mikulskytė; 5–7, 6–4, [10–8]	(Slovakia) Katarína Kužmová (Ukraine) Anastasiya Poplavska	(United States) Dasha Ivanova (Netherlands) Lian Tran	(Poland) Stefania Rogozińska Dzik (Czech Republic) Martina Přádová (Venezuela) Nadia Echeverría Alam (Belgium) Victoria Kalaitzis
October 7	Telavi Open; Telavi, Georgia; Clay; W15; Singles and Doubles Draws	(Romania) Oana Georgeta Simion; 6–2, 6–3	(Czech Republic) Anna Sisková	(Russia) Taisya Pachkaleva (Russia) Darya Astakhova	(Russia) Daria Kudashova (Russia) Anna Ureke (Ukraine) Marianna Zakarlyuk (Moldova) Anastasia Vdovenco
October 7	Telavi Open; Telavi, Georgia; Clay; W15; Singles and Doubles Draws	(Romania) Oana Georgeta Simion (Czech Republic) Anna Sisková; 6–1, 6–0	(Kazakhstan) Yekaterina Dmitrichenko (Russia) Anna Ureke	(Russia) Taisya Pachkaleva (Russia) Darya Astakhova	(Russia) Daria Kudashova (Russia) Anna Ureke (Ukraine) Marianna Zakarlyuk (Moldova) Anastasia Vdovenco
October 7	Hua Hin, Thailand; Hard; W15; Singles and Doubles Draws	(Hong Kong) Cody Wong Hong-yi; 2–6, 6–4, 6–3	(China) Han Jiangxue	(China) Ma Yexin (Thailand) Watsachol Sawatdee	(Thailand) Patcharin Cheapchandej (China) Kang Jiaqi (Thailand) Punnin Kovapitukted (Thailand) Tamachan Momkoonthod
October 7	Hua Hin, Thailand; Hard; W15; Singles and Doubles Draws	(Thailand) Patcharin Cheapchandej (Thailand) Punnin Kovapitukted; 6–3, 6–4	(China) Kang Jiaqi (Thailand) Tamarine Tanasugarn	(China) Ma Yexin (Thailand) Watsachol Sawatdee	(Thailand) Patcharin Cheapchandej (China) Kang Jiaqi (Thailand) Punnin Kovapitukted (Thailand) Tamachan Momkoonthod
October 7	Tabarka, Tunisia; Clay; W15; Singles and Doubles Draws	(Bulgaria) Julia Stamatova; 6–4, 6–3	(Slovenia) Pia Lovrič	(Italy) Martina Colmegna (Italy) Aurora Zantedeschi	(Argentina) Agustina Chlpac (United Kingdom) Alice Gillan (Bulgaria) Ani Vangelova (Croatia) Silvia Njirić
October 7	Tabarka, Tunisia; Clay; W15; Singles and Doubles Draws	(Italy) Martina Colmegna (Italy) Aurora Zantedeschi; 2–6, 6–2, [11–9]	(Slovenia) Pia Lovrič (Italy) Sara Ziodato	(Italy) Martina Colmegna (Italy) Aurora Zantedeschi	(Argentina) Agustina Chlpac (United Kingdom) Alice Gillan (Bulgaria) Ani Vangelova (Croatia) Silvia Njirić
October 7	Antalya, Turkey; Hard; W15; Singles and Doubles Draws	(Russia) Mariia Tkacheva; 6–2, 4–6, 6–1	(Germany) Romy Kölzer	(Bulgaria) Petia Arshinkova (Bulgaria) Gergana Topalova	(Italy) Claudia Giovine (Turkey) İpek Öz (Romania) Ioana Gașpar (Switzerland) Jenny Dürst
October 7	Antalya, Turkey; Hard; W15; Singles and Doubles Draws	(Netherlands) Eva Vedder (Netherlands) Stéphanie Visscher; 6–3, 6–0	(Germany) Anna Gabric (Germany) Romy Kölzer	(Bulgaria) Petia Arshinkova (Bulgaria) Gergana Topalova	(Italy) Claudia Giovine (Turkey) İpek Öz (Romania) Ioana Gașpar (Switzerland) Jenny Dürst
October 14	Suzhou Ladies Open; Suzhou, China; Hard; W100; Singles Draw – Doubles Draw	(China) Peng Shuai; 6–2, 3–6, 6–2	(China) Zhu Lin	(China) Wang Yafan (Japan) Nao Hibino	(Serbia) Natalija Kostić (India) Ankita Raina (Thailand) Peangtarn Plipuech (Denmark) Clara Tauson
October 14	Suzhou Ladies Open; Suzhou, China; Hard; W100; Singles Draw – Doubles Draw	(China) Jiang Xinyu (China) Tang Qianhui; 3–6, 6–3, [10–5]	(India) Ankita Raina (Netherlands) Rosalie van der Hoek	(China) Wang Yafan (Japan) Nao Hibino	(Serbia) Natalija Kostić (India) Ankita Raina (Thailand) Peangtarn Plipuech (Denmark) Clara Tauson
October 14	Kiskút Open; Székesfehérvár, Hungary; Clay (indoor); W60; Singles Draw – Doubles Draw	(Romania) Nicoleta Dascălu; 7–5, 6–2	(Romania) Irina Bara	(Turkey) Çağla Büyükakçay (Romania) Irina-Camelia Begu	(Montenegro) Danka Kovinić (Paraguay) Verónica Cepede Royg (Poland) Katarzyna Kawa (Slovakia) Rebecca Šramková
October 14	Kiskút Open; Székesfehérvár, Hungary; Clay (indoor); W60; Singles Draw – Doubles Draw	(Romania) Irina Bara (Belgium) Maryna Zanevska; 3–6, 6–2, [10–8]	(Uzbekistan) Akgul Amanmuradova (Romania) Elena Bogdan	(Turkey) Çağla Büyükakçay (Romania) Irina-Camelia Begu	(Montenegro) Danka Kovinić (Paraguay) Verónica Cepede Royg (Poland) Katarzyna Kawa (Slovakia) Rebecca Šramková
October 14	Hamamatsu, Japan; Carpet; W25; Singles and Doubles Draws	(Japan) Eri Hozumi; 7–6^{(7–1)}, 4–5, ret.	(Spain) Paula Badosa	(Japan) Hiromi Abe (Japan) Mei Yamaguchi	(Japan) Miharu Imanishi (Japan) Kanako Morisaki (Japan) Akiko Omae (Japan) Ayano Shimizu
October 14	Hamamatsu, Japan; Carpet; W25; Singles and Doubles Draws	(Hong Kong) Eudice Chong (Indonesia) Aldila Sutjiadi; 6–3, 6–4	(Japan) Sakura Hondo (Japan) Ramu Ueda	(Japan) Hiromi Abe (Japan) Mei Yamaguchi	(Japan) Miharu Imanishi (Japan) Kanako Morisaki (Japan) Akiko Omae (Japan) Ayano Shimizu
October 14	Lagos Open; Lagos, Nigeria; Hard; W25; Singles and Doubles Draws	(India) Riya Bhatia; 7–5, 1–6, 6–3	(Slovenia) Nastja Kolar	(India) Rutuja Bhosale (Ukraine) Valeriya Strakhova	(Australia) Seone Mendez (Egypt) Sandra Samir (Brazil) Laura Pigossi (Nigeria) Barakat Quadre
October 14	Lagos Open; Lagos, Nigeria; Hard; W25; Singles and Doubles Draws	(India) Rutuja Bhosale (Brazil) Laura Pigossi; 6–3, 6–7^{(3–7)}, [10–6]	(Egypt) Sandra Samir (India) Prarthana Thombare	(India) Rutuja Bhosale (Ukraine) Valeriya Strakhova	(Australia) Seone Mendez (Egypt) Sandra Samir (Brazil) Laura Pigossi (Nigeria) Barakat Quadre
October 14	Seville, Spain; Clay; W25; Singles and Doubles Draws	(Netherlands) Arantxa Rus; 6–4, 6–4	(Romania) Patricia Maria Țig	(Austria) Julia Grabher (Egypt) Mayar Sherif	(Spain) Eva Guerrero Álvarez (Croatia) Tereza Mrdeža (Spain) Cristina Bucșa (Argentina) Nadia Podoroska
October 14	Seville, Spain; Clay; W25; Singles and Doubles Draws	(Belgium) Marie Benoît (Germany) Julia Wachaczyk; 6–0, 6–7^{(3–7)}, [10–4]	(Spain) Eva Guerrero Álvarez (Netherlands) Arantxa Rus	(Austria) Julia Grabher (Egypt) Mayar Sherif	(Spain) Eva Guerrero Álvarez (Croatia) Tereza Mrdeža (Spain) Cristina Bucșa (Argentina) Nadia Podoroska
October 14	Waco, United States; Hard; W25; Singles and Doubles Draws	(Mexico) Fernanda Contreras; 6–3, 2–6, 6–1	(Canada) Leylah Annie Fernandez	(Kazakhstan) Anna Danilina (United States) Catherine Harrison	(Czech Republic) Monika Kilnarová (United States) Lorraine Guillermo (United Kingdom) Katie Swan (Montenegro) Vladica Babić
October 14	Waco, United States; Hard; W25; Singles and Doubles Draws	(Montenegro) Vladica Babić (Kazakhstan) Anna Danilina; 6–3, 6–2	(United States) Savannah Broadus (United States) Vanessa Ong	(Kazakhstan) Anna Danilina (United States) Catherine Harrison	(Czech Republic) Monika Kilnarová (United States) Lorraine Guillermo (United Kingdom) Katie Swan (Montenegro) Vladica Babić
October 14	Florence, United States; Clay; W25; Singles and Doubles Draws	(United States) Claire Liu; 6–1, 6–2	(United States) Peyton Stearns	(United States) Hanna Chang (Russia) Marina Melnikova	(United States) Emma Navarro (Sweden) Mirjam Björklund (Canada) Layne Sleeth (Australia) Olivia Tjandramulia
October 14	Florence, United States; Clay; W25; Singles and Doubles Draws	(United States) Emina Bektas (United Kingdom) Tara Moore; 7–5, 6–4	(Australia) Olivia Tjandramulia (Mexico) Marcela Zacarías	(United States) Hanna Chang (Russia) Marina Melnikova	(United States) Emma Navarro (Sweden) Mirjam Björklund (Canada) Layne Sleeth (Australia) Olivia Tjandramulia
October 14	Sharm El Sheikh, Egypt; Hard; W15; Singles and Doubles Draws	(United States) Dasha Ivanova; 6–4, 3–6, 6–4	(Belarus) Viktoryia Kanapatskaya	(Sweden) Linnéa Malmqvist (Switzerland) Valentina Ryser	(Czech Republic) Ivana Šebestová (United States) Paige Cline (France) Constance Sibille (Slovakia) Timea Jarušková
October 14	Sharm El Sheikh, Egypt; Hard; W15; Singles and Doubles Draws	(Belarus) Viktoryia Kanapatskaya (Belarus) Katyarina Paulenka; 6–3, 3–6, [10–4]	(France) Manon Arcangioli (France) Kélia Le Bihan	(Sweden) Linnéa Malmqvist (Switzerland) Valentina Ryser	(Czech Republic) Ivana Šebestová (United States) Paige Cline (France) Constance Sibille (Slovakia) Timea Jarušková
October 14	Telavi Open; Telavi, Georgia; Clay; W15; Singles and Doubles Draws	(Russia) Daria Kudashova; 6–2, 4–6, 6–4	(Romania) Oana Georgeta Simion	(Russia) Darya Astakhova (Czech Republic) Anna Sisková	(Russia) Taisya Pachkaleva (Georgia (country)) Lana Kentchiashvili (Ukraine) Marianna Zakarlyuk (Russia) Anastasia Zolotareva
October 14	Telavi Open; Telavi, Georgia; Clay; W15; Singles and Doubles Draws	(Russia) Margarita Lazareva (Romania) Oana Georgeta Simion; 6–4, 4–6, [10–8]	(Russia) Valeriya Olyanovskaya (Russia) Taisya Pachkaleva	(Russia) Darya Astakhova (Czech Republic) Anna Sisková	(Russia) Taisya Pachkaleva (Georgia (country)) Lana Kentchiashvili (Ukraine) Marianna Zakarlyuk (Russia) Anastasia Zolotareva
October 14	Metepec, Mexico; Hard; W15; Singles and Doubles Draws	(United States) Sarah Lee; 6–0, 6–2	(Canada) Arisha Ladhani	(Guatemala) Kirsten-Andrea Weedon (Canada) Stacey Fung	(United States) Eva Raszkiewicz (United States) Akilah James (Dominican Republic) Kelly Williford (Netherlands) Merel Hoedt
October 14	Metepec, Mexico; Hard; W15; Singles and Doubles Draws	(United States) Sarah Lee (United States) Amber Washington; 6–1, 4–6, [10–6]	(Guatemala) Kirsten-Andrea Weedon (Dominican Republic) Kelly Williford	(Guatemala) Kirsten-Andrea Weedon (Canada) Stacey Fung	(United States) Eva Raszkiewicz (United States) Akilah James (Dominican Republic) Kelly Williford (Netherlands) Merel Hoedt
October 14	Hua Hin, Thailand; Hard; W15; Singles and Doubles Draws	(Japan) Moyuka Uchijima; 6–2, 6–4	(Thailand) Mananchaya Sawangkaew	(Denmark) Olga Helmi (Japan) Sakura Hosogi	(China) Han Jiangxue (South Korea) Ku Yeon-woo (Japan) Misaki Matsuda (China) Liu Chang
October 14	Hua Hin, Thailand; Hard; W15; Singles and Doubles Draws	(Thailand) Tamachan Momkoonthod (Thailand) Watsachol Sawatdee; 7–5, 6–3	(Thailand) Patcharin Cheapchandej (China) Ni Ma Zhuoma	(Denmark) Olga Helmi (Japan) Sakura Hosogi	(China) Han Jiangxue (South Korea) Ku Yeon-woo (Japan) Misaki Matsuda (China) Liu Chang
October 14	Tabarka, Tunisia; Clay; W15; Singles and Doubles Draws	(Bosnia and Herzegovina) Nefisa Berberović; 6–2, 6–2	(Bulgaria) Julia Stamatova	(France) Inès Nicault (Belgium) Chelsea Vanhoutte	(Slovenia) Pia Lovrič (Italy) Costanza Traversi (Russia) Sofia Dmitrieva (Croatia) Silvia Njirić
October 14	Tabarka, Tunisia; Clay; W15; Singles and Doubles Draws	(Bosnia and Herzegovina) Nefisa Berberović (Croatia) Silvia Njirić; 6–0, 6–3	(Switzerland) Nicole Gadient (Belgium) Chelsea Vanhoutte	(France) Inès Nicault (Belgium) Chelsea Vanhoutte	(Slovenia) Pia Lovrič (Italy) Costanza Traversi (Russia) Sofia Dmitrieva (Croatia) Silvia Njirić
October 14	Antalya, Turkey; Hard; W15; Singles and Doubles Draws	(Czech Republic) Magdaléna Pantůčková; 6–3, 6–1	(United Kingdom) Gabriella Taylor	(Netherlands) Eva Vedder (North Macedonia) Lina Gjorcheska	(Turkey) Ayla Aksu (Russia) Anastasia Tikhonova (Belgium) Eliessa Vanlangendonck (Bulgaria) Petia Arshinkova
October 14	Antalya, Turkey; Hard; W15; Singles and Doubles Draws	(Croatia) Mariana Dražić (North Macedonia) Lina Gjorcheska; 7–5, 4–6, [10–7]	(Netherlands) Eva Vedder (Netherlands) Stéphanie Visscher	(Netherlands) Eva Vedder (North Macedonia) Lina Gjorcheska	(Turkey) Ayla Aksu (Russia) Anastasia Tikhonova (Belgium) Eliessa Vanlangendonck (Bulgaria) Petia Arshinkova
October 21	Kiskút Open II; Székesfehérvár, Hungary; Clay (indoor); W100; Singles Draw – Doubles Draw	(Montenegro) Danka Kovinić; 6–4, 3–6, 6–3	(Romania) Irina-Camelia Begu	(Ukraine) Katarina Zavatska (Paraguay) Verónica Cepede Royg	(Slovenia) Kaja Juvan (Germany) Tamara Korpatsch (Italy) Jasmine Paolini (Italy) Martina Trevisan
October 21	Kiskút Open II; Székesfehérvár, Hungary; Clay (indoor); W100; Singles Draw – Doubles Draw	(Spain) Georgina García Pérez (Hungary) Fanny Stollár; 6–1, 7–6^{(7–4)}	(Slovenia) Nina Potočnik (Slovenia) Nika Radišič	(Ukraine) Katarina Zavatska (Paraguay) Verónica Cepede Royg	(Slovenia) Kaja Juvan (Germany) Tamara Korpatsch (Italy) Jasmine Paolini (Italy) Martina Trevisan
October 21	Internationaux Féminins de la Vienne; Poitiers, France; Hard (indoor); W80; Singles Draw – Doubles Draw	(Serbia) Nina Stojanović; 6–2, 7–6^{(7–2)}	(Russia) Liudmila Samsonova	(Russia) Vitalia Diatchenko (France) Océane Dodin	(Italy) Giulia Gatto-Monticone (Czech Republic) Tereza Martincová (Russia) Natalia Vikhlyantseva (Germany) Tatjana Maria
October 21	Internationaux Féminins de la Vienne; Poitiers, France; Hard (indoor); W80; Singles Draw – Doubles Draw	(France) Amandine Hesse (France) Harmony Tan; 6–4, 6–2	(Germany) Tayisiya Morderger (Germany) Yana Morderger	(Russia) Vitalia Diatchenko (France) Océane Dodin	(Italy) Giulia Gatto-Monticone (Czech Republic) Tereza Martincová (Russia) Natalia Vikhlyantseva (Germany) Tatjana Maria
October 21	Mercer Tennis Classic; Macon, United States; Hard; W80; Singles Draw – Doubles Draw	(United States) Katerina Stewart; 6–7^{(2–7)}, 6–3, 6–2	(United States) Shelby Rogers	(United States) Danielle Lao (United States) Grace Min	(United States) Irina Falconi (Switzerland) Stefanie Vögele (United States) CoCo Vandeweghe (United States) Whitney Osuigwe
October 21	Mercer Tennis Classic; Macon, United States; Hard; W80; Singles Draw – Doubles Draw	(United States) Usue Maitane Arconada (United States) Caroline Dolehide; 6–7^{(2–7)}, 6–2, [10–8]	(Australia) Jaimee Fourlis (Greece) Valentini Grammatikopoulou	(United States) Danielle Lao (United States) Grace Min	(United States) Irina Falconi (Switzerland) Stefanie Vögele (United States) CoCo Vandeweghe (United States) Whitney Osuigwe
October 21	Bendigo Women's International; Bendigo, Australia; Hard; W60; Singles Draw – Doubles Draw	(Australia) Lizette Cabrera; 6–2, 6–3	(Australia) Maddison Inglis	(Australia) Priscilla Hon (Japan) Kyōka Okamura	(Australia) Olivia Rogowska (Japan) Chihiro Muramatsu (Australia) Destanee Aiava (Australia) Storm Sanders
October 21	Bendigo Women's International; Bendigo, Australia; Hard; W60; Singles Draw – Doubles Draw	(Australia) Maddison Inglis (Australia) Kaylah McPhee; 3–6, 6–2, [10–2]	(United Kingdom) Naiktha Bains (Slovakia) Tereza Mihalíková	(Australia) Priscilla Hon (Japan) Kyōka Okamura	(Australia) Olivia Rogowska (Japan) Chihiro Muramatsu (Australia) Destanee Aiava (Australia) Storm Sanders
October 21	Challenger de Saguenay; Saguenay, Canada; Hard (indoor); W60; Singles Draw – Doubles Draw	(Netherlands) Indy de Vroome; 3–6, 6–4, 7–5	(United States) Robin Anderson	(Canada) Françoise Abanda (United Kingdom) Samantha Murray	(United States) Jessica Livianu (Belgium) Kimberley Zimmermann (Canada) Leylah Annie Fernandez (Netherlands) Bibiane Schoofs
October 21	Challenger de Saguenay; Saguenay, Canada; Hard (indoor); W60; Singles Draw – Doubles Draw	(Canada) Mélodie Collard (Canada) Leylah Annie Fernandez; 7–6^{(7–3)}, 6–2	(United Kingdom) Samantha Murray (Netherlands) Bibiane Schoofs	(Canada) Françoise Abanda (United Kingdom) Samantha Murray	(United States) Jessica Livianu (Belgium) Kimberley Zimmermann (Canada) Leylah Annie Fernandez (Netherlands) Bibiane Schoofs
October 21	Nanning, China; Hard; W25; Singles and Doubles Draws	(Liechtenstein) Kathinka von Deichmann; 4–6, 7–6^{(7–3)}, 7–5	(Russia) Anastasia Gasanova	(China) Lu Jiajing (Slovenia) Dalila Jakupović	(China) Guo Meiqi (Denmark) Clara Tauson (China) Ma Shuyue (Russia) Valeria Savinykh
October 21	Nanning, China; Hard; W25; Singles and Doubles Draws	(Russia) Ksenia Laskutova (Cyprus) Raluca Șerban; 6–2, 6–4	(China) Cao Siqi (China) Wang Danni	(China) Lu Jiajing (Slovenia) Dalila Jakupović	(China) Guo Meiqi (Denmark) Clara Tauson (China) Ma Shuyue (Russia) Valeria Savinykh
October 21	Cúcuta, Colombia; Clay; W25; Singles and Doubles Draws	(United States) Allie Kiick; 6–2, 6–2	(Switzerland) Conny Perrin	(Netherlands) Cindy Burger (Colombia) Emiliana Arango	(Brazil) Carolina Alves (Colombia) Camila Osorio (Kazakhstan) Anna Danilina (Chile) Bárbara Gatica
October 21	Cúcuta, Colombia; Clay; W25; Singles and Doubles Draws	(Brazil) Carolina Alves (Mexico) Renata Zarazúa; 6–1, 0–0, ret.	(Colombia) Emiliana Arango (Argentina) Victoria Bosio	(Netherlands) Cindy Burger (Colombia) Emiliana Arango	(Brazil) Carolina Alves (Colombia) Camila Osorio (Kazakhstan) Anna Danilina (Chile) Bárbara Gatica
October 21	Istanbul, Turkey; Hard (indoor); W25; Singles and Doubles Draws	(Russia) Kamilla Rakhimova; 6–3, 5–7, 6–3	(Turkey) Pemra Özgen	(Belarus) Anna Kubareva (Netherlands) Richèl Hogenkamp	(Romania) Elena-Gabriela Ruse (Poland) Katarzyna Piter (Serbia) Olga Danilović (Russia) Vlada Koval
October 21	Istanbul, Turkey; Hard (indoor); W25; Singles and Doubles Draws	(Netherlands) Richèl Hogenkamp (Netherlands) Lesley Pattinama Kerkhove; 6–2, 2–6, [10–6]	(Switzerland) Susan Bandecchi (Poland) Katarzyna Piter	(Belarus) Anna Kubareva (Netherlands) Richèl Hogenkamp	(Romania) Elena-Gabriela Ruse (Poland) Katarzyna Piter (Serbia) Olga Danilović (Russia) Vlada Koval
October 21	Dallas, United States; Hard; W25; Singles and Doubles Draws	(United States) Jamie Loeb; 6–0, 6–7^{(3–7)}, 6–0	(Ukraine) Anhelina Kalinina	(Mexico) Marcela Zacarías (United Kingdom) Katie Swan	(Australia) Olivia Tjandramulia (United States) Tori Kinard (United States) Kayla Day (Czech Republic) Monika Kilnarová
October 21	Dallas, United States; Hard; W25; Singles and Doubles Draws	(Australia) Olivia Tjandramulia (Mexico) Marcela Zacarías; 6–3, 6–4	(United Kingdom) Emily Appleton (United States) Jamie Loeb	(Mexico) Marcela Zacarías (United Kingdom) Katie Swan	(Australia) Olivia Tjandramulia (United States) Tori Kinard (United States) Kayla Day (Czech Republic) Monika Kilnarová
October 21	Sharm El Sheikh, Egypt; Hard; W15; Singles and Doubles Draws	(Belarus) Viktoryia Kanapatskaya; 6–2, 6–2	(Italy) Camilla Rosatello	(Sweden) Linnéa Malmqvist (Switzerland) Arlinda Rushiti	(Poland) Martyna Kubka (Russia) Svetlana Iansitova (Poland) Weronika Falkowska (Romania) Ana Bianca Mihăilă
October 21	Sharm El Sheikh, Egypt; Hard; W15; Singles and Doubles Draws	(Poland) Weronika Falkowska (Poland) Martyna Kubka; 7–5, 6–1	(Romania) Elena-Teodora Cadar (Australia) Jelena Stojanovic	(Sweden) Linnéa Malmqvist (Switzerland) Arlinda Rushiti	(Poland) Martyna Kubka (Russia) Svetlana Iansitova (Poland) Weronika Falkowska (Romania) Ana Bianca Mihăilă
October 21	Metepec, Mexico; Hard; W15; Singles and Doubles Draws	(France) Caroline Roméo; 6–4, 1–6, 6–3	(Canada) Stacey Fung	(Guatemala) Kirsten-Andrea Weedon (United States) Sabastiani León	(United States) Akilah James (Dominican Republic) Kelly Williford (Mexico) Brenda Báez (Netherlands) Merel Hoedt
October 21	Metepec, Mexico; Hard; W15; Singles and Doubles Draws	(United States) Sarah Lee (United States) Sabastiani León; 4–6, 6–4, [10–4]	(Netherlands) Merel Hoedt (France) Caroline Roméo	(Guatemala) Kirsten-Andrea Weedon (United States) Sabastiani León	(United States) Akilah James (Dominican Republic) Kelly Williford (Mexico) Brenda Báez (Netherlands) Merel Hoedt
October 21	Oslo, Norway; Hard (indoor); W15; Singles and Doubles Draws	(Russia) Ekaterina Kazionova; 6–3, 6–0	(Italy) Verena Meliss	(Germany) Kathleen Kanev (Italy) Sara Gambogi	(Lithuania) Iveta Dapkutė (Norway) Malene Helgø (Denmark) Olga Helmi (Estonia) Katriin Saar
October 21	Oslo, Norway; Hard (indoor); W15; Singles and Doubles Draws	(Russia) Ekaterina Kazionova (United Kingdom) Anna Popescu; 3–6, 7–5, [10–5]	(Lithuania) Iveta Dapkutė (Slovakia) Ingrid Vojčináková	(Germany) Kathleen Kanev (Italy) Sara Gambogi	(Lithuania) Iveta Dapkutė (Norway) Malene Helgø (Denmark) Olga Helmi (Estonia) Katriin Saar
October 21	Lousada, Portugal; Hard (indoor); W15; Singles and Doubles Draws	(Portugal) Francisca Jorge; 4–6, 7–6^{(8–6)}, 6–4	(France) Carole Monnet	(Spain) Ainhoa Atucha Gómez (France) Aubane Droguet	(Spain) Almudena Sanz-Llaneza Fernández (Spain) Celia Cerviño Ruiz (Portugal) Inês Murta (France) Margaux Orange
October 21	Lousada, Portugal; Hard (indoor); W15; Singles and Doubles Draws	(Spain) Celia Cerviño Ruiz (Spain) Ángeles Moreno Barranquero; 6–3, 7–5	(Portugal) Francisca Jorge (Spain) Olga Parres Azcoitia	(Spain) Ainhoa Atucha Gómez (France) Aubane Droguet	(Spain) Almudena Sanz-Llaneza Fernández (Spain) Celia Cerviño Ruiz (Portugal) Inês Murta (France) Margaux Orange
October 21	Stockholm, Sweden; Hard (indoor); W15; Singles and Doubles Draws	(France) Julie Gervais; 6–1, 6–3	(Sweden) Fanny Östlund	(Finland) Oona Orpana (Sweden) Jacqueline Cabaj Awad	(United Kingdom) Tiffany William (Sweden) Sara Dahlström (Sweden) Ida Jarlskog (Russia) Angelina Zhuravleva
October 21	Stockholm, Sweden; Hard (indoor); W15; Singles and Doubles Draws	(Sweden) Fanny Östlund (Russia) Alina Silich; 6–3, 6–2	(Sweden) Jacqueline Cabaj Awad (Finland) Oona Orpana	(Finland) Oona Orpana (Sweden) Jacqueline Cabaj Awad	(United Kingdom) Tiffany William (Sweden) Sara Dahlström (Sweden) Ida Jarlskog (Russia) Angelina Zhuravleva
October 21	Tabarka, Tunisia; Clay; W15; Singles and Doubles Draws	(Ukraine) Ganna Poznikhirenko; 2–6, 6–3, 6–4	(Germany) Julyette Steur	(Egypt) Lamis Alhussein Abdel Aziz (Russia) Alina Charaeva	(Belgium) Chelsea Vanhoutte (Italy) Nuria Brancaccio (Italy) Martina Colmegna (Hong Kong) Adithya Karunaratne
October 21	Tabarka, Tunisia; Clay; W15; Singles and Doubles Draws	(Bosnia and Herzegovina) Nefisa Berberović (Croatia) Silvia Njirić; 7–6^{(7–5)}, 6–4	(Ukraine) Ganna Poznikhirenko (Germany) Julyette Steur	(Egypt) Lamis Alhussein Abdel Aziz (Russia) Alina Charaeva	(Belgium) Chelsea Vanhoutte (Italy) Nuria Brancaccio (Italy) Martina Colmegna (Hong Kong) Adithya Karunaratne
October 21	Antalya, Turkey; Hard; W15; Singles and Doubles Draws	(Russia) Daria Kruzhkova; 6–0, 3–0 ret.	(United Kingdom) Gabriella Taylor	(Russia) Anastasia Tikhonova (Netherlands) Noa Liauw a Fong	(Austria) Mira Antonitsch (Russia) Yana Karpovich (Romania) Ioana Gașpar (Turkey) Özlem Uslu
October 21	Antalya, Turkey; Hard; W15; Singles and Doubles Draws	(Austria) Mira Antonitsch (United Kingdom) Gabriella Taylor; 6–4, 6–7^{(5–7)}, [10–3]	(Ukraine) Viktoriia Dema (Netherlands) Noa Liauw a Fong	(Russia) Anastasia Tikhonova (Netherlands) Noa Liauw a Fong	(Austria) Mira Antonitsch (Russia) Yana Karpovich (Romania) Ioana Gașpar (Turkey) Özlem Uslu
October 21	Austin, United States; Hard; W15; Singles and Doubles Draws	(Italy) Bianca Turati; 3–6, 6–3, 6–2	(Italy) Anna Turati	(United States) Charlotte Chavatipon (Argentina) Melany Krywoj	(Peru) Dominique Schaefer (Russia) Anastasia Sysoeva (France) Tiphanie Fiquet (United States) Elvina Kalieva
October 21	Austin, United States; Hard; W15; Singles and Doubles Draws	(Italy) Anna Turati (Italy) Bianca Turati; 6–3, 1–6, [10–4]	(Argentina) Melany Krywoj (Chile) Fernanda Labraña	(United States) Charlotte Chavatipon (Argentina) Melany Krywoj	(Peru) Dominique Schaefer (Russia) Anastasia Sysoeva (France) Tiphanie Fiquet (United States) Elvina Kalieva
October 28	RBC Pro Challenge; Tyler, United States; Hard; W80; Singles Draw – Doubles Draw	(Luxembourg) Mandy Minella; 6–4, 6–4	(United States) Alexa Glatch	(Mexico) Marcela Zacarías (United States) Danielle Lao	(United States) Caroline Dolehide (United States) CoCo Vandeweghe (United States) Whitney Osuigwe (United States) Jamie Loeb
October 28	RBC Pro Challenge; Tyler, United States; Hard; W80; Singles Draw – Doubles Draw	(Indonesia) Beatrice Gumulya (Indonesia) Jessy Rompies; 6–2, 6–3	(Chinese Taipei) Hsu Chieh-yu (Mexico) Marcela Zacarías	(Mexico) Marcela Zacarías (United States) Danielle Lao	(United States) Caroline Dolehide (United States) CoCo Vandeweghe (United States) Whitney Osuigwe (United States) Jamie Loeb
October 28	City of Playford Tennis International II; Playford, Australia; Hard; W60; Singles Draw – Doubles Draw	(Australia) Storm Sanders; 6–3, 6–4	(Australia) Lizette Cabrera	(Japan) Chihiro Muramatsu (Australia) Maddison Inglis	(United States) Jennifer Elie (United Kingdom) Naiktha Bains (United States) Asia Muhammad (Australia) Belinda Woolcock
October 28	City of Playford Tennis International II; Playford, Australia; Hard; W60; Singles Draw – Doubles Draw	(United States) Asia Muhammad (Australia) Storm Sanders; 6–3, 6–4	(United Kingdom) Naiktha Bains (Slovakia) Tereza Mihalíková	(Japan) Chihiro Muramatsu (Australia) Maddison Inglis	(United States) Jennifer Elie (United Kingdom) Naiktha Bains (United States) Asia Muhammad (Australia) Belinda Woolcock
October 28	Tevlin Women's Challenger; Toronto, Canada; Hard (indoor); W60; Singles Draw – Doubles Draw	(United States) Francesca Di Lorenzo; 7–6^{(7–3)}, 6–4	(Belgium) Kirsten Flipkens	(United Kingdom) Samantha Murray (Netherlands) Bibiane Schoofs	(Bulgaria) Elitsa Kostova (Netherlands) Indy de Vroome (France) Jessika Ponchet (United States) Catherine Harrison
October 28	Tevlin Women's Challenger; Toronto, Canada; Hard (indoor); W60; Singles Draw – Doubles Draw	(United States) Robin Anderson (France) Jessika Ponchet; 7–6^{(9–7)}, 6–2	(Canada) Mélodie Collard (Canada) Leylah Annie Fernandez	(United Kingdom) Samantha Murray (Netherlands) Bibiane Schoofs	(Bulgaria) Elitsa Kostova (Netherlands) Indy de Vroome (France) Jessika Ponchet (United States) Catherine Harrison
October 28	Liuzhou Open; Liuzhou, China; Hard; W60; Singles Draw – Doubles Draw	(China) Zhu Lin; 2–6, 6–0, 6–1	(Australia) Arina Rodionova	(China) Xu Shilin (China) Lu Jiajing	(China) Liu Fangzhou (Serbia) Dejana Radanović (Georgia (country)) Mariam Bolkvadze (Serbia) Natalija Kostić
October 28	Liuzhou Open; Liuzhou, China; Hard; W60; Singles Draw – Doubles Draw	(China) Jiang Xinyu (China) Tang Qianhui; 6–4, 6–4	(India) Ankita Raina (Netherlands) Rosalie van der Hoek	(China) Xu Shilin (China) Lu Jiajing	(China) Liu Fangzhou (Serbia) Dejana Radanović (Georgia (country)) Mariam Bolkvadze (Serbia) Natalija Kostić
October 28	Open Nantes Atlantique; Nantes, France; Hard (indoor); W60; Singles Draw – Doubles Draw	(Spain) Cristina Bucșa; 6–2, 6–7^{(11–13)}, 7–6^{(8–6)}	(Germany) Tamara Korpatsch	(Italy) Martina Caregaro (Romania) Ana Bogdan	(Germany) Tatjana Maria (France) Audrey Albié (Russia) Vitalia Diatchenko (France) Amandine Hesse
October 28	Open Nantes Atlantique; Nantes, France; Hard (indoor); W60; Singles Draw – Doubles Draw	(Uzbekistan) Akgul Amanmuradova (Georgia (country)) Ekaterine Gorgodze; 7–6^{(7–2)}, 6–3	(Germany) Vivian Heisen (Russia) Yana Sizikova	(Italy) Martina Caregaro (Romania) Ana Bogdan	(Germany) Tatjana Maria (France) Audrey Albié (Russia) Vitalia Diatchenko (France) Amandine Hesse
October 28	Centenario Open; Asunción, Paraguay; Clay; W60; Singles Draw – Doubles Draw	(Italy) Elisabetta Cocciaretto; 6–1, 4–6, 6–0	(Italy) Sara Errani	(Argentina) Guillermina Naya (Colombia) Camila Osorio	(Mexico) Renata Zarazúa (Brazil) Gabriela Cé (Brazil) Teliana Pereira (United States) Allie Kiick
October 28	Centenario Open; Asunción, Paraguay; Clay; W60; Singles Draw – Doubles Draw	(Venezuela) Andrea Gámiz (Spain) Georgina García Pérez; 6–4, 3–6, [10–3]	(Kazakhstan) Anna Danilina (Switzerland) Conny Perrin	(Argentina) Guillermina Naya (Colombia) Camila Osorio	(Mexico) Renata Zarazúa (Brazil) Gabriela Cé (Brazil) Teliana Pereira (United States) Allie Kiick
October 28	Pétange, Luxembourg; Hard (indoor); W25; Singles and Doubles Draws	(Netherlands) Arantxa Rus; 6–3, 3–6, 6–3	(Romania) Laura Ioana Paar	(Spain) Paula Badosa (Russia) Sofya Lansere	(Turkey) Pemra Özgen (Sweden) Marina Yudanov (Poland) Katarzyna Piter (France) Harmony Tan
October 28	Pétange, Luxembourg; Hard (indoor); W25; Singles and Doubles Draws	(Romania) Laura Ioana Paar (Germany) Julia Wachaczyk; 7–6^{(13–11)}, 1–6, [11–9]	(Poland) Katarzyna Piter (Netherlands) Arantxa Rus	(Spain) Paula Badosa (Russia) Sofya Lansere	(Turkey) Pemra Özgen (Sweden) Marina Yudanov (Poland) Katarzyna Piter (France) Harmony Tan
October 28	Bogotá, Colombia; Clay (indoor); W15; Singles and Doubles Draws	(United States) Dasha Ivanova; 6–3, 2–1 ret.	(Hungary) Vanda Lukács	(Russia) Nika Kukharchuk (Chile) Ivania Martinich	(Colombia) Yuliana Monroy (Colombia) María Juliana Parra Romero (Colombia) María Paulina Pérez (Colombia) Antonia Samudio
October 28	Bogotá, Colombia; Clay (indoor); W15; Singles and Doubles Draws	(Italy) Alessandra Simone (Australia) Tina Nadine Smith; 6–4, 6–1	(Brazil) Marcela Guimarães Bueno (United States) Sierra Stone	(Russia) Nika Kukharchuk (Chile) Ivania Martinich	(Colombia) Yuliana Monroy (Colombia) María Juliana Parra Romero (Colombia) María Paulina Pérez (Colombia) Antonia Samudio
October 28	Sharm El Sheikh, Egypt; Hard; W15; Singles and Doubles Draws	(Egypt) Sandra Samir; 6–2, 6–1	(Poland) Joanna Zawadzka	(Bosnia and Herzegovina) Anita Husarić (Switzerland) Joanne Züger	(Italy) Federica Prati (Austria) Melanie Klaffner (Ukraine) Marianna Zakarlyuk (Poland) Martyna Kubka
October 28	Sharm El Sheikh, Egypt; Hard; W15; Singles and Doubles Draws	(Italy) Federica Prati (Egypt) Sandra Samir; 6–2, 6–2	(South Africa) Warona Mdlulwa (Argentina) Catalina Pella	(Bosnia and Herzegovina) Anita Husarić (Switzerland) Joanne Züger	(Italy) Federica Prati (Austria) Melanie Klaffner (Ukraine) Marianna Zakarlyuk (Poland) Martyna Kubka
October 28	Internazionali Tennis Val Gardena Südtirol; Ortisei, Italy; Hard (indoor); W15; Singles and Doubles Draws	(Italy) Claudia Giovine; 4–6, 6–1, 6–1	(Germany) Anja Wildgruber	(Germany) Sina Herrmann (Belgium) Clara Vlasselaer	(Italy) Verena Hofer (Italy) Alessandra Mazzola (Italy) Sara Gambogi (Czech Republic) Aneta Laboutková
October 28	Internazionali Tennis Val Gardena Südtirol; Ortisei, Italy; Hard (indoor); W15; Singles and Doubles Draws	(Czech Republic) Klára Hájková (Czech Republic) Aneta Laboutková; 6–3, 3–6, [10–7]	(Italy) Claudia Giovine (Russia) Maria Marfutina	(Germany) Sina Herrmann (Belgium) Clara Vlasselaer	(Italy) Verena Hofer (Italy) Alessandra Mazzola (Italy) Sara Gambogi (Czech Republic) Aneta Laboutková
October 28	Cancún, Mexico; Hard; W15; Singles and Doubles Draws	(Hungary) Adrienn Nagy; 6–3, 6–2	(United States) Rachel Gailis	(India) Ramya Natarajan (Samoa) Steffi Carruthers	(United States) Taylor Ng (Russia) Anfisa Danilchenko (France) Diana Martynov (United States) Mary Closs
October 28	Cancún, Mexico; Hard; W15; Singles and Doubles Draws	(United States) Madison Appel (United States) Elle Christensen; 6–1, 6–4	(Brazil) Jennifer Rosa Dourado (Russia) Anastasia Sysoeva	(India) Ramya Natarajan (Samoa) Steffi Carruthers	(United States) Taylor Ng (Russia) Anfisa Danilchenko (France) Diana Martynov (United States) Mary Closs
October 28	Lousada, Portugal; Hard (indoor); W15; Singles and Doubles Draws	(Spain) Celia Cerviño Ruiz; 0–6, 7–6^{(7–5)}, 6–3	(Romania) Ioana Loredana Roșca	(France) Margaux Orange (Czech Republic) Linda Nosková	(Spain) Marina Bassols Ribera (Portugal) Francisca Jorge (France) Aubane Droguet (France) Jade Suvrijn
October 28	Lousada, Portugal; Hard (indoor); W15; Singles and Doubles Draws	(Portugal) Francisca Jorge (Spain) Olga Parres Azcoitia; 6–4, 6–3	(Portugal) Ana Filipa Santos (Spain) Almudena Sanz-Llaneza Fernández	(France) Margaux Orange (Czech Republic) Linda Nosková	(Spain) Marina Bassols Ribera (Portugal) Francisca Jorge (France) Aubane Droguet (France) Jade Suvrijn
October 28	Stockholm, Sweden; Hard (indoor); W15; Singles and Doubles Draws	(Finland) Anastasia Kulikova; 7–5, 6–3	(Estonia) Elena Malõgina	(Sweden) Jacqueline Cabaj Awad (Sweden) Fanny Östlund	(Russia) Anna Ukolova (Russia) Elina Avanesyan (Russia) Ekaterina Kazionova (Russia) Noel Saidenova
October 28	Stockholm, Sweden; Hard (indoor); W15; Singles and Doubles Draws	(Latvia) Margarita Ignatjeva (Russia) Ekaterina Kazionova; 2–6, 7–6^{(7–5)}, [10–4]	(Sweden) Jacqueline Cabaj Awad (Finland) Oona Orpana	(Sweden) Jacqueline Cabaj Awad (Sweden) Fanny Östlund	(Russia) Anna Ukolova (Russia) Elina Avanesyan (Russia) Ekaterina Kazionova (Russia) Noel Saidenova
October 28	Tabarka, Tunisia; Clay; W15; Singles and Doubles Draws	(Ukraine) Ganna Poznikhirenko; 6–4, 6–1	(Germany) Julyette Steur	(Italy) Federica Arcidiacono (Burundi) Sada Nahimana	(Egypt) Lamis Alhussein Abdel Aziz (Italy) Nuria Brancaccio (Italy) Giulia Crescenzi (Hong Kong) Adithya Karunaratne
October 28	Tabarka, Tunisia; Clay; W15; Singles and Doubles Draws	(Ukraine) Ganna Poznikhirenko (Germany) Julyette Steur; 7–6^{(11–9)}, 6–3	(France) Yasmine Mansouri (Burundi) Sada Nahimana	(Italy) Federica Arcidiacono (Burundi) Sada Nahimana	(Egypt) Lamis Alhussein Abdel Aziz (Italy) Nuria Brancaccio (Italy) Giulia Crescenzi (Hong Kong) Adithya Karunaratne
October 28	Antalya, Turkey; Hard; W15; Singles and Doubles Draws	(Russia) Daria Kruzhkova; 7–5, 5–7, 7–6^{(7–1)}	(Russia) Mariia Tkacheva	(Ukraine) Liubov Kostenko (Netherlands) Noa Liauw a Fong	(Germany) Jantje Tilbürger (Czech Republic) Magdaléna Pantůčková (Ukraine) Viktoriia Dema (Ukraine) Valeriya Strakhova
October 28	Antalya, Turkey; Hard; W15; Singles and Doubles Draws	(Russia) Victoria Mikhaylova (Russia) Mariia Tkacheva; 6–3, 7–5	(Ukraine) Anastasiya Poplavska (Belarus) Nika Shytkouskaya	(Ukraine) Liubov Kostenko (Netherlands) Noa Liauw a Fong	(Germany) Jantje Tilbürger (Czech Republic) Magdaléna Pantůčková (Ukraine) Viktoriia Dema (Ukraine) Valeriya Strakhova

=== November ===
Week of	Tournament	Winner	Runners-up	Semifinalists	Quarterfinalists
November 4	Shenzhen Longhua Open; Shenzhen, China; Hard; W100; Singles Draw – Doubles Draw	(China) Zhu Lin; 6–3, 1–3, ret.	(China) Peng Shuai	(Italy) Jasmine Paolini (Japan) Kurumi Nara	(Montenegro) Danka Kovinić (Serbia) Nina Stojanović (Slovakia) Jana Čepelová (Hungary) Tímea Babos
November 4	Shenzhen Longhua Open; Shenzhen, China; Hard; W100; Singles Draw – Doubles Draw	(Japan) Nao Hibino (Japan) Makoto Ninomiya; 6–4, 6–0	(Georgia (country)) Sofia Shapatava (United Kingdom) Emily Webley-Smith	(Italy) Jasmine Paolini (Japan) Kurumi Nara	(Montenegro) Danka Kovinić (Serbia) Nina Stojanović (Slovakia) Jana Čepelová (Hungary) Tímea Babos
November 4	Copa LP Chile Hacienda Chicureo; Colina, Chile; Clay; W60; Singles Draw – Doubles Draw	(Italy) Elisabetta Cocciaretto; 6–3, 6–4	(Argentina) Victoria Bosio	(United States) Allie Kiick (Egypt) Mayar Sherif	(Germany) Katharina Gerlach (Brazil) Gabriela Cé (Australia) Seone Mendez (Colombia) Camila Osorio
November 4	Copa LP Chile Hacienda Chicureo; Colina, Chile; Clay; W60; Singles Draw – Doubles Draw	(United States) Hayley Carter (Brazil) Luisa Stefani; 5–7, 6–3, [10–6]	(Kazakhstan) Anna Danilina (Switzerland) Conny Perrin	(United States) Allie Kiick (Egypt) Mayar Sherif	(Germany) Katharina Gerlach (Brazil) Gabriela Cé (Australia) Seone Mendez (Colombia) Camila Osorio
November 4	Henderson Tennis Open; Las Vegas, United States; Hard; W60; Singles Draw – Doubles Draw	(Japan) Mayo Hibi; 6–2, 5–7, 6–2	(Ukraine) Anhelina Kalinina	(Canada) Katherine Sebov (Ukraine) Katarina Zavatska	(Belarus) Olga Govortsova (United States) Varvara Lepchenko (United States) Caroline Dolehide (United States) Alexa Glatch
November 4	Henderson Tennis Open; Las Vegas, United States; Hard; W60; Singles Draw – Doubles Draw	(Belarus) Olga Govortsova (Luxembourg) Mandy Minella; 6–3, 6–4	(United States) Sophie Chang (United States) Alexandra Mueller	(Canada) Katherine Sebov (Ukraine) Katarina Zavatska	(Belarus) Olga Govortsova (United States) Varvara Lepchenko (United States) Caroline Dolehide (United States) Alexa Glatch
November 4	Saint-Étienne, France; Hard (indoor); W25; Singles and Doubles Draws	(Romania) Ana Bogdan; Walkover	(France) Océane Dodin	(Germany) Tamara Korpatsch (Russia) Vitalia Diatchenko	(France) Estelle Cascino (France) Elsa Jacquemot (Turkey) Çağla Büyükakçay (Italy) Martina Trevisan
November 4	Saint-Étienne, France; Hard (indoor); W25; Singles and Doubles Draws	(Russia) Marina Melnikova (Romania) Laura Ioana Paar; 6–3, 6–7^{(7–9)}, [11–9]	(Spain) Cristina Bucșa (Germany) Julia Wachaczyk	(Germany) Tamara Korpatsch (Russia) Vitalia Diatchenko	(France) Estelle Cascino (France) Elsa Jacquemot (Turkey) Çağla Büyükakçay (Italy) Martina Trevisan
November 4	Hua Hin, Thailand; Hard; W25; Singles and Doubles Draws	(Netherlands) Lesley Pattinama Kerkhove; 7–6^{(7–5)}, 5–7, 7–5	(Hong Kong) Eudice Chong	(United Kingdom) Naiktha Bains (Switzerland) Simona Waltert	(United States) Hurricane Tyra Black (Chinese Taipei) Joanna Garland (Thailand) Nudnida Luangnam (Japan) Kyōka Okamura
November 4	Hua Hin, Thailand; Hard; W25; Singles and Doubles Draws	(Romania) Georgia Crăciun (Spain) Eva Guerrero Álvarez; 6–2, 7–5	(Netherlands) Lesley Pattinama Kerkhove (Thailand) Tamarine Tanasugarn	(United Kingdom) Naiktha Bains (Switzerland) Simona Waltert	(United States) Hurricane Tyra Black (Chinese Taipei) Joanna Garland (Thailand) Nudnida Luangnam (Japan) Kyōka Okamura
November 4	Malibu, United States; Hard; W25; Singles and Doubles Draws	(Italy) Bianca Turati; 4–6, 6–4, 6–4	(United States) Katie Volynets	(United States) Katrina Scott (United States) Claire Liu	(United States) Ashley Lahey (Belgium) Kimberley Zimmermann (United States) Jessica Failla (Serbia) Jovana Jakšić
November 4	Malibu, United States; Hard; W25; Singles and Doubles Draws	(Hungary) Dalma Gálfi (Belgium) Kimberley Zimmermann; 7–6^{(7–5)}, 6–3	(United States) Lorraine Guillermo (Poland) Anna Hertel	(United States) Katrina Scott (United States) Claire Liu	(United States) Ashley Lahey (Belgium) Kimberley Zimmermann (United States) Jessica Failla (Serbia) Jovana Jakšić
November 4	Sharm El Sheikh, Egypt; Hard; W15; Singles and Doubles Draws	(Chinese Taipei) Lee Pei-chi; 6–2, 2–6, 6–2	(Austria) Melanie Klaffner	(Romania) Elena-Teodora Cadar (Ukraine) Marianna Zakarlyuk	(Egypt) Sandra Samir (Germany) Romy Kölzer (Italy) Federica Prati (Italy) Anastasia Grymalska
November 4	Sharm El Sheikh, Egypt; Hard; W15; Singles and Doubles Draws	(Chinese Taipei) Lee Pei-chi (Romania) Ana Bianca Mihăilă; 6–2, 6–4	(United Kingdom) Aleksandra Pitak (United Kingdom) Katarzyna Pitak	(Romania) Elena-Teodora Cadar (Ukraine) Marianna Zakarlyuk	(Egypt) Sandra Samir (Germany) Romy Kölzer (Italy) Federica Prati (Italy) Anastasia Grymalska
November 4	Pärnu, Estonia; Hard (indoor); W15; Singles and Doubles Draws	(Estonia) Elena Malõgina; 6–4, 1–6, 7–5	(Russia) Ekaterina Kazionova	(Russia) Ekaterina Shalimova (Estonia) Katriin Saar	(Russia) Anastasia Pribylova (Lithuania) Iveta Dapkutė (Finland) Anastasia Kulikova (Netherlands) Suzan Lamens
November 4	Pärnu, Estonia; Hard (indoor); W15; Singles and Doubles Draws	(Netherlands) Suzan Lamens (Russia) Anastasia Pribylova; 6–1, 6–2	(Lithuania) Iveta Daujotaitė (Latvia) Patrīcija Špaka	(Russia) Ekaterina Shalimova (Estonia) Katriin Saar	(Russia) Anastasia Pribylova (Lithuania) Iveta Dapkutė (Finland) Anastasia Kulikova (Netherlands) Suzan Lamens
November 4	Heraklion, Greece; Clay; W15; Singles and Doubles Draws	(Italy) Lisa Pigato; Walkover	(Italy) Melania Delai	(Czech Republic) Barbora Miklová (Germany) Eva Lys	(Romania) Oana Gavrilă (Switzerland) Lisa Sabino (Spain) Noelia Bouzó Zanotti (Croatia) Iva Primorac
November 4	Heraklion, Greece; Clay; W15; Singles and Doubles Draws	(Spain) Noelia Bouzó Zanotti (Bolivia) Noelia Zeballos; 6–4, 5–7, [10–6]	(Netherlands) Lexie Stevens (Serbia) Draginja Vuković	(Czech Republic) Barbora Miklová (Germany) Eva Lys	(Romania) Oana Gavrilă (Switzerland) Lisa Sabino (Spain) Noelia Bouzó Zanotti (Croatia) Iva Primorac
November 4	Guatemala City, Guatemala; Hard; W15; Singles and Doubles Draws	(France) Caroline Roméo; 6–2, 7–6^{(7–5)}	(Colombia) María Paulina Pérez	(Guatemala) Melissa Morales (Guatemala) Kirsten-Andrea Weedon	(Argentina) Catalina Pella (Canada) Arisha Ladhani (United States) Sabastiani León (United States) Mara Schmidt
November 4	Guatemala City, Guatemala; Hard; W15; Singles and Doubles Draws	(Guatemala) Melissa Morales (Guatemala) Kirsten-Andrea Weedon; 6–3, 7–6^{(7–4)}	(South Africa) Warona Mdlulwa (Argentina) Catalina Pella	(Guatemala) Melissa Morales (Guatemala) Kirsten-Andrea Weedon	(Argentina) Catalina Pella (Canada) Arisha Ladhani (United States) Sabastiani León (United States) Mara Schmidt
November 4	Solarino, Italy; Carpet; W15; Singles and Doubles Draws	(Switzerland) Bojana Klincov; 3–6, 6–4, 6–3	(Italy) Tatiana Pieri	(Italy) Federica Bilardo (Italy) Maria Masini	(Czech Republic) Nikola Břečková (Italy) Nicole Fossa Huergo (Germany) Lisa Ponomar (Belgium) Eline Audenaert
November 4	Solarino, Italy; Carpet; W15; Singles and Doubles Draws	(Netherlands) Isabelle Haverlag (United Kingdom) Anna Popescu; 6–1, 6–1	(Italy) Maria Masini (Italy) Anastasia Piangerelli	(Italy) Federica Bilardo (Italy) Maria Masini	(Czech Republic) Nikola Břečková (Italy) Nicole Fossa Huergo (Germany) Lisa Ponomar (Belgium) Eline Audenaert
November 4	Cancún, Mexico; Hard; W15; Singles and Doubles Draws	(Mexico) María José Portillo Ramírez; 6–7^{(4–7)}, 7–5, 6–2	(France) Tiphanie Fiquet	(Russia) Anastasia Sysoeva (Samoa) Steffi Carruthers	(Czech Republic) Laetitia Pulchartová (Japan) Chisa Hosonuma (United States) Misa Malkin (United States) Sofia Sewing
November 4	Cancún, Mexico; Hard; W15; Singles and Doubles Draws	(Israel) Shavit Kimchi (Hungary) Adrienn Nagy; 6–3, 6–2	(France) Tiphanie Fiquet (Croatia) Tea Jandrić	(Russia) Anastasia Sysoeva (Samoa) Steffi Carruthers	(Czech Republic) Laetitia Pulchartová (Japan) Chisa Hosonuma (United States) Misa Malkin (United States) Sofia Sewing
November 4	Monastir, Tunisia; Hard; W15; Singles and Doubles Draws	(Italy) Lucrezia Stefanini; 6–4, 6–0	(Burundi) Sada Nahimana	(Czech Republic) Nikola Tomanová (Spain) Yvonne Cavallé Reimers	(France) Marie Témin (France) Vinciane Rémy (France) Yasmine Mansouri (France) Carla Touly
November 4	Monastir, Tunisia; Hard; W15; Singles and Doubles Draws	(Italy) Angelica Raggi (France) Carla Touly; 3–6, 6–4, [10–7]	(Egypt) Lamis Alhussein Abdel Aziz (Gabon) Célestine Avomo Ella	(Czech Republic) Nikola Tomanová (Spain) Yvonne Cavallé Reimers	(France) Marie Témin (France) Vinciane Rémy (France) Yasmine Mansouri (France) Carla Touly
November 4	Antalya, Turkey; Hard; W15; Singles and Doubles Draws	(Japan) Shiho Akita; 6–2, 6–4	(Czech Republic) Magdaléna Pantůčková	(Czech Republic) Johana Marková (Romania) Andreea Ghițescu	(Romania) Ioana Gașpar (Romania) Karola Patricia Bejenaru (Ukraine) Liubov Kostenko (Switzerland) Fiona Ganz
November 4	Antalya, Turkey; Hard; W15; Singles and Doubles Draws	(Czech Republic) Johana Marková (Slovenia) Nika Radišič; 6–2, 4–6, [11–9]	(Spain) Paula Arias Manjón (Malta) Francesca Curmi	(Czech Republic) Johana Marková (Romania) Andreea Ghițescu	(Romania) Ioana Gașpar (Romania) Karola Patricia Bejenaru (Ukraine) Liubov Kostenko (Switzerland) Fiona Ganz
November 11	Ando Securities Open; Tokyo, Japan; Hard; W100; Singles Draw – Doubles Draw	(China) Zhang Shuai; 6–3, 7–5	(Italy) Jasmine Paolini	(Germany) Tatjana Maria (China) Peng Shuai	(Japan) Nao Hibino (China) Wang Xinyu (China) Han Xinyun (Japan) Kurumi Nara
November 11	Ando Securities Open; Tokyo, Japan; Hard; W100; Singles Draw – Doubles Draw	(South Korea) Choi Ji-hee (South Korea) Han Na-lae; 6–3, 6–3	(Japan) Haruka Kaji (Japan) Junri Namigata	(Germany) Tatjana Maria (China) Peng Shuai	(Japan) Nao Hibino (China) Wang Xinyu (China) Han Xinyun (Japan) Kurumi Nara
November 11	Minsk, Belarus; Hard (indoor); W25; Singles and Doubles Draws	(Russia) Anastasia Zakharova; 6–4, 6–3	(Russia) Marina Melnikova	(Belarus) Yuliya Hatouka (Italy) Lucia Bronzetti	(Italy) Jessica Pieri (Russia) Anastasia Gasanova (United Kingdom) Emma Raducanu (Poland) Katarzyna Piter
November 11	Minsk, Belarus; Hard (indoor); W25; Singles and Doubles Draws	(Russia) Victoria Kan (Russia) Anna Morgina; 7–6^{(7–3)}, 7–6^{(7–4)}	(Netherlands) Suzan Lamens (Russia) Anastasia Pribylova	(Belarus) Yuliya Hatouka (Italy) Lucia Bronzetti	(Italy) Jessica Pieri (Russia) Anastasia Gasanova (United Kingdom) Emma Raducanu (Poland) Katarzyna Piter
November 11	Gwalior, India; Hard; W25; Singles and Doubles Draws	(China) Lu Jiajing; 7–5, 6–2	(Georgia (country)) Sofia Shapatava	(Turkey) Berfu Cengiz (India) Sowjanya Bavisetti	(Japan) Funa Kozaki (India) Karman Thandi (United Kingdom) Freya Christie (Russia) Maria Timofeeva
November 11	Gwalior, India; Hard; W25; Singles and Doubles Draws	(Japan) Mana Kawamura (Japan) Funa Kozaki; 6–4, 6–1	(Bulgaria) Petia Arshinkova (Bulgaria) Gergana Topalova	(Turkey) Berfu Cengiz (India) Sowjanya Bavisetti	(Japan) Funa Kozaki (India) Karman Thandi (United Kingdom) Freya Christie (Russia) Maria Timofeeva
November 11	Hua Hin, Thailand; Hard; W25; Singles and Doubles Draws	(Netherlands) Lesley Pattinama Kerkhove; 6–3, 6–4	(United States) Hurricane Tyra Black	(Russia) Valentina Ivakhnenko (Spain) Eva Guerrero Álvarez	(Papua New Guinea) Abigail Tere-Apisah (China) Xun Fangying (Thailand) Patcharin Cheapchandej (Switzerland) Simona Waltert
November 11	Hua Hin, Thailand; Hard; W25; Singles and Doubles Draws	(Netherlands) Lesley Pattinama Kerkhove (Thailand) Tamarine Tanasugarn; 6–2, 7–6^{(7–5)}	(Hong Kong) Ng Kwan-yau (China) Zheng Saisai	(Russia) Valentina Ivakhnenko (Spain) Eva Guerrero Álvarez	(Papua New Guinea) Abigail Tere-Apisah (China) Xun Fangying (Thailand) Patcharin Cheapchandej (Switzerland) Simona Waltert
November 11	Orlando, United States; Clay; W25; Singles and Doubles Draws	(Netherlands) Arantxa Rus; 6–3, 6–2	(Romania) Irina Fetecău	(Germany) Stephanie Wagner (United States) Maria Mateas	(United States) Claire Liu (Germany) Julyette Steur (Mexico) Renata Zarazúa (Australia) Seone Mendez
November 11	Orlando, United States; Clay; W25; Singles and Doubles Draws	(United States) Katharine Fahey (Germany) Stephanie Wagner; 4–6, 6–2, [10–7]	(Brazil) Carolina Alves (Mexico) Renata Zarazúa	(Germany) Stephanie Wagner (United States) Maria Mateas	(United States) Claire Liu (Germany) Julyette Steur (Mexico) Renata Zarazúa (Australia) Seone Mendez
November 11	Sharm El Sheikh, Egypt; Hard; W15; Singles and Doubles Draws	(Chinese Taipei) Lee Pei-chi; 6–4, 7–6^{(7–3)}	(Czech Republic) Martina Přádová	(Egypt) Sandra Samir (Romania) Ana Bianca Mihăilă	(Sweden) Ellen Allgurin (Romania) Elena-Teodora Cadar (Guadeloupe) Anne-Sophie Morandais (Moldova) Vitalia Stamat
November 11	Sharm El Sheikh, Egypt; Hard; W15; Singles and Doubles Draws	(United Kingdom) Aleksandra Pitak (United Kingdom) Katarzyna Pitak; 7–6^{(7–4)}, 6–4	(South Korea) Jeong Yeong-won (South Korea) Lee Eun-hye	(Egypt) Sandra Samir (Romania) Ana Bianca Mihăilă	(Sweden) Ellen Allgurin (Romania) Elena-Teodora Cadar (Guadeloupe) Anne-Sophie Morandais (Moldova) Vitalia Stamat
November 11	Heraklion, Greece; Clay; W15; Singles and Doubles Draws	(Latvia) Daniela Vismane; 0–6, 7–6^{(7–5)}, 6–1	(Russia) Darya Astakhova	(Italy) Lisa Pigato (Italy) Melania Delai	(Spain) Ángela Fita Boluda (Romania) Arina Gabriela Vasilescu (Croatia) Iva Primorac (Slovenia) Živa Falkner
November 11	Heraklion, Greece; Clay; W15; Singles and Doubles Draws	(Armenia) Ani Amiraghyan (Bulgaria) Julia Stamatova; 6–1, 4–6, [10–7]	(Romania) Oana Gavrilă (Bolivia) Noelia Zeballos	(Italy) Lisa Pigato (Italy) Melania Delai	(Spain) Ángela Fita Boluda (Romania) Arina Gabriela Vasilescu (Croatia) Iva Primorac (Slovenia) Živa Falkner
November 11	Solarino, Italy; Carpet; W15; Singles and Doubles Draws	(Germany) Tayisiya Morderger; 7–6^{(7–5)}, 6–7^{(7–9)}, 6–1	(Italy) Nicole Fossa Huergo	(Slovenia) Veronika Erjavec (Switzerland) Bojana Klincov	(Italy) Federica Bilardo (Germany) Yana Morderger (Italy) Giulia Crescenzi (Italy) Nuria Brancaccio
November 11	Solarino, Italy; Carpet; W15; Singles and Doubles Draws	(Germany) Tayisiya Morderger (Germany) Yana Morderger; 6–2, 6–3	(United States) Emma Davis (Italy) Nicole Fossa Huergo	(Slovenia) Veronika Erjavec (Switzerland) Bojana Klincov	(Italy) Federica Bilardo (Germany) Yana Morderger (Italy) Giulia Crescenzi (Italy) Nuria Brancaccio
November 11	Cancún, Mexico; Hard; W15; Singles and Doubles Draws	(Canada) Raphaëlle Lacasse; 6–4, 7–5	(Slovakia) Viktória Morvayová	(United States) Vanessa Ong (United States) Sofia Sewing	(Netherlands) Eva Vedder (Spain) Almudena Sanz-Llaneza Fernández (United States) Elle Christensen (Hungary) Adrienn Nagy
November 11	Cancún, Mexico; Hard; W15; Singles and Doubles Draws	(Israel) Maya Tahan (Netherlands) Eva Vedder; 6–4, 4–6, [10–2]	(United States) Allura Zamarripa (United States) Maribella Zamarripa	(United States) Vanessa Ong (United States) Sofia Sewing	(Netherlands) Eva Vedder (Spain) Almudena Sanz-Llaneza Fernández (United States) Elle Christensen (Hungary) Adrienn Nagy
November 11	Monastir, Tunisia; Hard; W15; Singles and Doubles Draws	(France) Carole Monnet; 6–2, 3–1, ret.	(Romania) Andreea Prisăcariu	(Italy) Angelica Raggi (Serbia) Bojana Marinković	(Venezuela) Nadia Echeverría Alam (Spain) Ane Mintegi del Olmo (Russia) Ksenia Laskutova (France) Yasmine Mansouri
November 11	Monastir, Tunisia; Hard; W15; Singles and Doubles Draws	(Venezuela) Nadia Echeverría Alam (Lithuania) Justina Mikulskytė; 7–6^{(8–6)}, 7–6^{(7–2)}	(Egypt) Lamis Alhussein Abdel Aziz (Gabon) Célestine Avomo Ella	(Italy) Angelica Raggi (Serbia) Bojana Marinković	(Venezuela) Nadia Echeverría Alam (Spain) Ane Mintegi del Olmo (Russia) Ksenia Laskutova (France) Yasmine Mansouri
November 11	Antalya, Turkey; Clay; W15; Singles and Doubles Draws	(Turkey) İpek Öz; 6–1, 6–3	(Czech Republic) Johana Marková	(Ukraine) Viktoriya Petrenko (Turkey) İlay Yörük	(Russia) Diana Demidova (Bulgaria) Gebriela Mihaylova (Japan) Aiko Yoshitomi (Hungary) Dorka Drahota-Szabó
November 11	Antalya, Turkey; Clay; W15; Singles and Doubles Draws	(Czech Republic) Johana Marková (Slovenia) Nika Radišič; 6–4, 7–5	(Turkey) İpek Öz (Ukraine) Viktoriya Petrenko	(Ukraine) Viktoriya Petrenko (Turkey) İlay Yörük	(Russia) Diana Demidova (Bulgaria) Gebriela Mihaylova (Japan) Aiko Yoshitomi (Hungary) Dorka Drahota-Szabó
November 18	Bhopal, India; Hard; W25; Singles and Doubles Draws	(Japan) Chihiro Muramatsu; 6–1, 3–1, ret.	(India) Karman Thandi	(Germany) Sarah-Rebecca Sekulic (Austria) Melanie Klaffner	(Japan) Mana Kawamura (India) Sowjanya Bavisetti (Bulgaria) Gergana Topalova (Switzerland) Karin Kennel
November 18	Bhopal, India; Hard; W25; Singles and Doubles Draws	(India) Rutuja Bhosale (United Kingdom) Emily Webley-Smith; 6–4, 7–5	(Latvia) Diāna Marcinkēviča (Ukraine) Valeriya Strakhova	(Germany) Sarah-Rebecca Sekulic (Austria) Melanie Klaffner	(Japan) Mana Kawamura (India) Sowjanya Bavisetti (Bulgaria) Gergana Topalova (Switzerland) Karin Kennel
November 18	Solarino, Italy; Carpet; W25; Singles and Doubles Draws	(Italy) Giulia Gatto-Monticone; 2–6, 6–3, 7–5	(Croatia) Jana Fett	(Croatia) Tereza Mrdeža (France) Océane Dodin	(United Kingdom) Amanda Carreras (Spain) Olga Sáez Larra (Netherlands) Indy de Vroome (Georgia (country)) Mariam Bolkvadze
November 18	Solarino, Italy; Carpet; W25; Singles and Doubles Draws	(Germany) Tayisiya Morderger (Germany) Yana Morderger; 6–3, 6–4	(Spain) Olga Parres Azcoitia (Romania) Ioana Loredana Roșca	(Croatia) Tereza Mrdeža (France) Océane Dodin	(United Kingdom) Amanda Carreras (Spain) Olga Sáez Larra (Netherlands) Indy de Vroome (Georgia (country)) Mariam Bolkvadze
November 18	Naples, United States; Clay; W25; Singles and Doubles Draws	(Australia) Seone Mendez; 6–3, 6–4	(Hungary) Panna Udvardy	(Romania) Gabriela Talabă (Mexico) Renata Zarazúa	(United States) Danielle Collins (United States) Katharine Fahey (United States) Quinn Gleason (Spain) María Gutirérrez Carrasco
November 18	Naples, United States; Clay; W25; Singles and Doubles Draws	(Mexico) María José Portillo Ramírez (Romania) Gabriela Talabă; 7–5, 6–2	(Croatia) Lea Bošković (Australia) Seone Mendez	(Romania) Gabriela Talabă (Mexico) Renata Zarazúa	(United States) Danielle Collins (United States) Katharine Fahey (United States) Quinn Gleason (Spain) María Gutirérrez Carrasco
November 18	Tucson, United States; Hard; W25; Singles and Doubles Draws	(United States) Hailey Baptiste; 4–6, 6–4, 6–3	(Mexico) Marcela Zacarías	(Australia) Olivia Tjandramulia (United States) Katie Volynets	(New Zealand) Valentina Ivanov (United States) Catherine Harrison (United States) Sophia Whittle (Montenegro) Vladica Babić
November 18	Tucson, United States; Hard; W25; Singles and Doubles Draws	Doubles competition was cancelled after the completion of the quarterfinals due to ongoing poor weather conditions		(Australia) Olivia Tjandramulia (United States) Katie Volynets	(New Zealand) Valentina Ivanov (United States) Catherine Harrison (United States) Sophia Whittle (Montenegro) Vladica Babić
November 18	Sharm El Sheikh, Egypt; Hard; W15; Singles and Doubles Draws	(Chinese Taipei) Lee Pei-chi; 6–2, 6–4	(Russia) Anna Morgina	(Romania) Elena-Teodora Cadar (South Korea) Lee Eun-hye	(Switzerland) Valentina Ryser (Switzerland) Arlinda Rushiti (Romania) Ana Bianca Mihăilă (United Kingdom) Aleksandra Pitak
November 18	Sharm El Sheikh, Egypt; Hard; W15; Singles and Doubles Draws	(South Korea) Jeong Yeong-won (South Korea) Lee Eun-hye; Walkover	(Netherlands) Michaëlla Krajicek (Switzerland) Valentina Ryser	(Romania) Elena-Teodora Cadar (South Korea) Lee Eun-hye	(Switzerland) Valentina Ryser (Switzerland) Arlinda Rushiti (Romania) Ana Bianca Mihăilă (United Kingdom) Aleksandra Pitak
November 18	Heraklion, Greece; Clay; W15; Singles and Doubles Draws	(Russia) Darya Astakhova; 4–6, 6–4, 6–3	(Romania) Arina Gabriela Vasilescu	(Spain) Noelia Bouzó Zanotti (Spain) Alba Carrillo Marín	(Slovenia) Pia Lovrič (Armenia) Ani Amiraghyan (Russia) Polina Leykina (Bolivia) Noelia Zeballos
November 18	Heraklion, Greece; Clay; W15; Singles and Doubles Draws	(Spain) Alba Carrillo Marín (Spain) Celia Cerviño Ruiz; 7–6^{(8–6)}, 6–1	(Spain) Claudia Hoste Ferrer (Russia) Polina Leykina	(Spain) Noelia Bouzó Zanotti (Spain) Alba Carrillo Marín	(Slovenia) Pia Lovrič (Armenia) Ani Amiraghyan (Russia) Polina Leykina (Bolivia) Noelia Zeballos
November 18	Cancún, Mexico; Hard; W15; Singles and Doubles Draws	(United States) Taylor Ng; 6–4, 7–6^{(7–2)}	(Japan) Mayuka Aikawa	(Spain) Almudena Sanz-Llaneza Fernández (United States) Maya Pitts	(United States) Jwany Sherif (Canada) Noëlly Longi Nsimba (United States) Paige Cline (United States) Elle Christensen
November 18	Cancún, Mexico; Hard; W15; Singles and Doubles Draws	(Brazil) Júlia Konishi Camargo Silva (United States) Taylor Ng; 7–6^{(9–7)}, 0–0 ret.	(United States) Elle Christensen (United States) Jwany Sherif	(Spain) Almudena Sanz-Llaneza Fernández (United States) Maya Pitts	(United States) Jwany Sherif (Canada) Noëlly Longi Nsimba (United States) Paige Cline (United States) Elle Christensen
November 18	Monastir, Tunisia; Hard; W15; Singles and Doubles Draws	(France) Carole Monnet; 6–2, 6–0	(France) Clara Burel	(France) Manon Arcangioli (Lithuania) Justina Mikulskytė	(Belgium) Clara Vlasselaer (Croatia) Mariana Dražić (Tunisia) Chiraz Bechri (France) Juline Fayard
November 18	Monastir, Tunisia; Hard; W15; Singles and Doubles Draws	(Serbia) Tamara Čurović (France) Carole Monnet; 6–3, 6–4	(France) Manon Arcangioli (France) Alice Robbe	(France) Manon Arcangioli (Lithuania) Justina Mikulskytė	(Belgium) Clara Vlasselaer (Croatia) Mariana Dražić (Tunisia) Chiraz Bechri (France) Juline Fayard
November 18	Antalya, Turkey; Hard; W15; Singles and Doubles Draws	(North Macedonia) Lina Gjorcheska; 6–3, 3–6, 6–1	(Russia) Irina Khromacheva	(Romania) Ioana Gașpar (Finland) Oona Orpana	(Russia) Valeriya Yushchenko (Japan) Naho Sato (Russia) Anna Chekanskaya (Romania) Andreea Ghițescu
November 18	Antalya, Turkey; Hard; W15; Singles and Doubles Draws	(Japan) Haine Ogata (Japan) Aiko Yoshitomi; 6–1, 6–1	(Switzerland) Jenny Dürst (Romania) Ioana Gașpar	(Romania) Ioana Gașpar (Finland) Oona Orpana	(Russia) Valeriya Yushchenko (Japan) Naho Sato (Russia) Anna Chekanskaya (Romania) Andreea Ghițescu
November 25	Solarino, Italy; Carpet; W25; Singles and Doubles Draws	(Netherlands) Indy de Vroome; 6–1, 6–2	(Poland) Urszula Radwańska	(Germany) Tamara Korpatsch (France) Océane Dodin	(Croatia) Tereza Mrdeža (Belgium) Lara Salden (Germany) Tayisiya Morderger (Czech Republic) Monika Kilnarová
November 25	Solarino, Italy; Carpet; W25; Singles and Doubles Draws	(Germany) Tayisiya Morderger (Germany) Yana Morderger; 6–3, 6–3	(Portugal) Sara Lança (Spain) Olga Parres Azcoitia	(Germany) Tamara Korpatsch (France) Océane Dodin	(Croatia) Tereza Mrdeža (Belgium) Lara Salden (Germany) Tayisiya Morderger (Czech Republic) Monika Kilnarová
November 25	Milovice, Czech Republic; Hard (indoor); W15; Singles and Doubles Draws	(Estonia) Kaia Kanepi; 6–4, 6–3	(Finland) Anastasia Kulikova	(Czech Republic) Linda Nosková (Czech Republic) Johana Marková	(Sweden) Caijsa Hennemann (Czech Republic) Nikola Břečková (Japan) Ange Oby Kajuru (Russia) Veronika Pepelyaeva
November 25	Milovice, Czech Republic; Hard (indoor); W15; Singles and Doubles Draws	(Russia) Aleksandra Pospelova (Russia) Anastasia Tikhonova; 6–1, 7–5	(Czech Republic) Karolína Beránková (Czech Republic) Barbora Miklová	(Czech Republic) Linda Nosková (Czech Republic) Johana Marková	(Sweden) Caijsa Hennemann (Czech Republic) Nikola Břečková (Japan) Ange Oby Kajuru (Russia) Veronika Pepelyaeva
November 25	Cairo, Egypt; Clay; W15; Singles and Doubles Draws	(Italy) Marion Viertler; 6–1, 6–4	(Egypt) Lamis Alhussein Abdel Aziz	(Spain) Carlota Martínez Círez (Czech Republic) Gabriela Horáčková	(Slovakia) Barbora Matúšová (Netherlands) Lexie Stevens (Russia) Viktoriia Kalinina (Spain) Ana Lantigua de la Nuez
November 25	Cairo, Egypt; Clay; W15; Singles and Doubles Draws	(Russia) Sofia Dmitrieva (Moldova) Vitalia Stamat; 6–0, 6–1	(Serbia) Doroteja Joksović (Switzerland) Nadine Keller	(Spain) Carlota Martínez Círez (Czech Republic) Gabriela Horáčková	(Slovakia) Barbora Matúšová (Netherlands) Lexie Stevens (Russia) Viktoriia Kalinina (Spain) Ana Lantigua de la Nuez
November 25	Heraklion, Greece; Clay; W15; Singles and Doubles Draws	(Russia) Darya Astakhova; 6–2, 6–0	(Bolivia) Noelia Zeballos	(Romania) Oana Smaranda Corneanu (Croatia) Oleksandra Oliynykova	(Austria) Yvonne Neuwirth (Romania) Ilinca Dalina Amariei (Israel) Lina Glushko (Spain) Celia Cerviño Ruiz
November 25	Heraklion, Greece; Clay; W15; Singles and Doubles Draws	(Romania) Ilinca Dalina Amariei (Romania) Alessia Beatrice Ciucă; 6–3, 6–3	(Russia) Darya Astakhova (Israel) Lina Glushko	(Romania) Oana Smaranda Corneanu (Croatia) Oleksandra Oliynykova	(Austria) Yvonne Neuwirth (Romania) Ilinca Dalina Amariei (Israel) Lina Glushko (Spain) Celia Cerviño Ruiz
November 25	Nonthaburi, Thailand; Hard; W15; Singles and Doubles Draws	(Japan) Himeno Sakatsume; 7–6^{(7–3)}, 5–7, 6–1	(Uzbekistan) Nigina Abduraimova	(South Korea) Jeong Su-nam (Chinese Taipei) Joanna Garland	(China) Guo Meiqi (China) Han Jiangxue (China) Zhang Ying (China) Ma Yexin
November 25	Nonthaburi, Thailand; Hard; W15; Singles and Doubles Draws	(United States) Sarah Lee (United States) Mara Schmidt; 6–2, 6–2	(Chinese Taipei) Hsieh Yu-ting (Chinese Taipei) Lee Pei-chi	(South Korea) Jeong Su-nam (Chinese Taipei) Joanna Garland	(China) Guo Meiqi (China) Han Jiangxue (China) Zhang Ying (China) Ma Yexin
November 25	Monastir, Tunisia; Hard; W15; Singles and Doubles Draws	(France) Carole Monnet; 7–5, 6–2	(Russia) Mariia Tkacheva	(Brazil) Laura Pigossi (Russia) Natalia Orlova	(Croatia) Mariana Dražić (Spain) Yvonne Cavallé Reimers (Germany) Anja Wildgruber (Serbia) Tamara Čurović
November 25	Monastir, Tunisia; Hard; W15; Singles and Doubles Draws	(Serbia) Tamara Čurović (Russia) Mariia Tkacheva; 6–3, 0–6, [10–8]	(Poland) Anna Hertel (Switzerland) Marie Mettraux	(Brazil) Laura Pigossi (Russia) Natalia Orlova	(Croatia) Mariana Dražić (Spain) Yvonne Cavallé Reimers (Germany) Anja Wildgruber (Serbia) Tamara Čurović
November 25	Antalya, Turkey; Hard; W15; Singles and Doubles Draws	(North Macedonia) Lina Gjorcheska; 6–4, 6–7^{(5–7)}, 6–1	(Finland) Oona Orpana	(Ukraine) Marianna Zakarlyuk (Russia) Irina Khromacheva	(Russia) Ekaterina Reyngold (United States) Anastasia Nefedova (Netherlands) Lara Panfilov (Netherlands) Stéphanie Visscher
November 25	Antalya, Turkey; Hard; W15; Singles and Doubles Draws	(Netherlands) Quirine Lemoine (Netherlands) Gabriella Mujan; 6–3, 6–4	(Romania) Ioana Gașpar (Russia) Nina Rudiukova	(Ukraine) Marianna Zakarlyuk (Russia) Irina Khromacheva	(Russia) Ekaterina Reyngold (United States) Anastasia Nefedova (Netherlands) Lara Panfilov (Netherlands) Stéphanie Visscher

=== December ===
Week of	Tournament	Winner	Runners-up	Semifinalists	Quarterfinalists
December 2	Solapur, India; Hard; W25; Singles and Doubles Draws	(India) Ankita Raina; 6–3, 6–3	(United Kingdom) Naiktha Bains	(Latvia) Diāna Marcinkēviča (United Kingdom) Katie Boulter	(Russia) Valeria Savinykh (China) Yuan Yue (Norway) Ulrikke Eikeri (Egypt) Sandra Samir
December 2	Solapur, India; Hard; W25; Singles and Doubles Draws	(Norway) Ulrikke Eikeri (India) Ankita Raina; 5–7, 6–4, [10–3]	(Turkey) Berfu Cengiz (Greece) Despina Papamichail	(Latvia) Diāna Marcinkēviča (United Kingdom) Katie Boulter	(Russia) Valeria Savinykh (China) Yuan Yue (Norway) Ulrikke Eikeri (Egypt) Sandra Samir
December 2	Jablonec nad Nisou, Czech Republic; Carpet (indoor); W15; Singles and Doubles Draws	(Estonia) Elena Malõgina; 6–4, 7–5	(Czech Republic) Miriam Kolodziejová	(Russia) Veronika Pepelyaeva (Japan) Ange Oby Kajuru	(Czech Republic) Lucie Petruželová (Czech Republic) Karolína Beránková (Czech Republic) Nikola Tomanová (Czech Republic) Barbora Miklová
December 2	Jablonec nad Nisou, Czech Republic; Carpet (indoor); W15; Singles and Doubles Draws	(Slovakia) Jana Jablonovská (Czech Republic) Nikola Tomanová; 7–6^{(7–4)}, 5–7, [10–4]	(Japan) Ange Oby Kajuru (Estonia) Elena Malõgina	(Russia) Veronika Pepelyaeva (Japan) Ange Oby Kajuru	(Czech Republic) Lucie Petruželová (Czech Republic) Karolína Beránková (Czech Republic) Nikola Tomanová (Czech Republic) Barbora Miklová
December 2	Cairo, Egypt; Clay; W15; Singles and Doubles Draws	(Romania) Oana Georgeta Simion; 3–6, 6–2, 6–1	(Germany) Julyette Steur	(Sweden) Marina Yudanov (Slovenia) Nastja Kolar	(Italy) Marion Viertler (Netherlands) Lexie Stevens (Russia) Maria Marfutina (Egypt) Lamis Alhussein Abdel Aziz
December 2	Cairo, Egypt; Clay; W15; Singles and Doubles Draws	(Germany) Joëlle Steur (Germany) Julyette Steur; 6–2, 6–3	(Czech Republic) Gabriela Horáčková (Spain) Ana Lantigua de la Nuez	(Sweden) Marina Yudanov (Slovenia) Nastja Kolar	(Italy) Marion Viertler (Netherlands) Lexie Stevens (Russia) Maria Marfutina (Egypt) Lamis Alhussein Abdel Aziz
December 2	Heraklion, Greece; Clay; W15; Singles and Doubles Draws	(Germany) Laura Schaeder; 6–4, 6–2	(Spain) Claudia Hoste Ferrer	(Croatia) Oleksandra Oliynykova (France) Joséphine Boualem	(Italy) Martina Spigarelli (Bolivia) Noelia Zeballos (Slovenia) Pia Lovrič (Russia) Darya Astakhova
December 2	Heraklion, Greece; Clay; W15; Singles and Doubles Draws	(Hungary) Dorka Drahota-Szabó (Slovakia) Laura Svatíková; 6–2, 6–4	(Israel) Lina Glushko (Croatia) Oleksandra Oliynykova	(Croatia) Oleksandra Oliynykova (France) Joséphine Boualem	(Italy) Martina Spigarelli (Bolivia) Noelia Zeballos (Slovenia) Pia Lovrič (Russia) Darya Astakhova
December 2	Cancún, Mexico; Hard; W15; Singles and Doubles Draws	(Mexico) Marcela Zacarías; 6–2, 6–3	(France) Aubane Droguet	(Japan) Natsumi Kawaguchi (Russia) Nika Kukharchuk	(United States) Gabriella Price (United States) Paige Cline (Japan) Mio Mushika (United States) Elle Christensen
December 2	Cancún, Mexico; Hard; W15; Singles and Doubles Draws	(Brazil) Eduarda Piai (Mexico) Marcela Zacarías; 2–6, 6–1, [10–7]	(Russia) Nika Kukharchuk (United Kingdom) Emilie Lindh	(Japan) Natsumi Kawaguchi (Russia) Nika Kukharchuk	(United States) Gabriella Price (United States) Paige Cline (Japan) Mio Mushika (United States) Elle Christensen
December 2	Nonthaburi, Thailand; Hard; W15; Singles and Doubles Draws	(Uzbekistan) Nigina Abduraimova; 6–1, 1–6, 6–3	(Chinese Taipei) Lee Pei-chi	(China) Ma Yexin (China) Han Jiangxue	(China) Zhang Ying (China) Kang Jiaqi (China) Liu Chang (China) Guo Meiqi
December 2	Nonthaburi, Thailand; Hard; W15; Singles and Doubles Draws	(Japan) Mana Kawamura (Japan) Funa Kozaki; 6–2, 6–0	(United States) Sarah Lee (United States) Mara Schmidt	(China) Ma Yexin (China) Han Jiangxue	(China) Zhang Ying (China) Kang Jiaqi (China) Liu Chang (China) Guo Meiqi
December 2	Monastir, Tunisia; Hard; W15; Singles and Doubles Draws	(Finland) Anastasia Kulikova; 7–6^{(8–6)}, 6–4	(Japan) Yuriko Lily Miyazaki	(France) Carole Monnet (Ukraine) Viktoriia Dema	(Spain) Yvonne Cavallé Reimers (Croatia) Antonia Ružić (France) Manon Arcangioli (France) Marine Partaud
December 2	Monastir, Tunisia; Hard; W15; Singles and Doubles Draws	(France) Yasmine Mansouri (Switzerland) Marie Mettraux; 6–4, 3–6, [10–6]	(France) Carole Monnet (Russia) Mariia Tkacheva	(France) Carole Monnet (Ukraine) Viktoriia Dema	(Spain) Yvonne Cavallé Reimers (Croatia) Antonia Ružić (France) Manon Arcangioli (France) Marine Partaud
December 2	Antalya, Turkey; Hard; W15; Singles and Doubles Draws	(Switzerland) Leonie Küng; 6–2, 6–4	(Romania) Georgia Crăciun	(Romania) Ioana Gașpar (Ukraine) Viktoriya Petrenko	(Netherlands) Stéphanie Visscher (France) Jade Suvrijn (United States) Anastasia Nefedova (Turkey) Melis Sezer
December 2	Antalya, Turkey; Hard; W15; Singles and Doubles Draws	(Romania) Georgia Crăciun (Romania) Ioana Gașpar; 6–4, 1–6, [14–12]	(Switzerland) Leonie Küng (Turkey) Melis Sezer	(Romania) Ioana Gașpar (Ukraine) Viktoriya Petrenko	(Netherlands) Stéphanie Visscher (France) Jade Suvrijn (United States) Anastasia Nefedova (Turkey) Melis Sezer
December 2	Norman, United States; Hard; W15; Singles and Doubles Draws	(United States) Kennedy Shaffer; 6–4, 4–6, 7–6^{(7–3)}	(United States) Jessica Failla	(United States) Pamela Montez (France) Tiphanie Fiquet	(Latvia) Līga Dekmeijere (Canada) Stacey Fung (United States) Emma Davis (United Kingdom) Jasmine Amber Asghar
December 2	Norman, United States; Hard; W15; Singles and Doubles Draws	(Australia) Lisa Mays (United Kingdom) Nell Miller; 7–6^{(7–5)}, 4–6, [10–8]	(United States) Carmen Corley (United States) Ivana Corley	(United States) Pamela Montez (France) Tiphanie Fiquet	(Latvia) Līga Dekmeijere (Canada) Stacey Fung (United States) Emma Davis (United Kingdom) Jasmine Amber Asghar
December 9	Al Habtoor Tennis Challenge; Dubai, United Arab Emirates; Hard; W100+H; Singles Draw – Doubles Draw	(Romania) Ana Bogdan; 6–1, 6–2	(Ukraine) Daria Snigur	(France) Kristina Mladenovic (Belgium) Greet Minnen	(Spain) Sara Sorribes Tormo (Poland) Magdalena Fręch (Austria) Barbara Haas (Poland) Katarzyna Kawa
December 9	Al Habtoor Tennis Challenge; Dubai, United Arab Emirates; Hard; W100+H; Singles Draw – Doubles Draw	(Czech Republic) Lucie Hradecká (Slovenia) Andreja Klepač; 7–5, 3–6, [10–8]	(Spain) Georgina García Pérez (Spain) Sara Sorribes Tormo	(France) Kristina Mladenovic (Belgium) Greet Minnen	(Spain) Sara Sorribes Tormo (Poland) Magdalena Fręch (Austria) Barbara Haas (Poland) Katarzyna Kawa
December 9	Pune, India; Hard; W25; Singles and Doubles Draws	(United Kingdom) Emma Raducanu; 3–6, 6–1, 6–4	(United Kingdom) Naiktha Bains	(Russia) Olga Doroshina (Thailand) Peangtarn Plipuech	(Japan) Naho Sato (Belarus) Shalimar Talbi (Thailand) Punnin Kovapitukted (Australia) Alicia Smith
December 9	Pune, India; Hard; W25; Singles and Doubles Draws	(Norway) Ulrikke Eikeri (Russia) Ekaterina Yashina; 1–6, 6–3, [10–5]	(Russia) Daria Mishina (Russia) Anna Morgina	(Russia) Olga Doroshina (Thailand) Peangtarn Plipuech	(Japan) Naho Sato (Belarus) Shalimar Talbi (Thailand) Punnin Kovapitukted (Australia) Alicia Smith
December 9	Cairo, Egypt; Clay; W15; Singles and Doubles Draws	(Romania) Oana Georgeta Simion; 6–2, 6–1	(Germany) Julyette Steur	(Spain) Ana Lantigua de la Nuez (Slovenia) Nastja Kolar	(Netherlands) Lexie Stevens (Italy) Marion Viertler (Egypt) Lamis Alhussein Abdel Aziz (Russia) Maria Marfutina
December 9	Cairo, Egypt; Clay; W15; Singles and Doubles Draws	(Russia) Maria Marfutina (Romania) Oana Georgeta Simion; 3–6, 6–0, [10–2]	(Slovenia) Nastja Kolar (Russia) Anna Makhorkina	(Spain) Ana Lantigua de la Nuez (Slovenia) Nastja Kolar	(Netherlands) Lexie Stevens (Italy) Marion Viertler (Egypt) Lamis Alhussein Abdel Aziz (Russia) Maria Marfutina
December 9	Heraklion, Greece; Clay; W15; Singles and Doubles Draws	(United States) Chiara Scholl; 6–2, 5–7, 6–1	(Croatia) Oleksandra Oliynykova	(Italy) Martina Spigarelli (Russia) Polina Leykina	(Germany) Laura Schaeder (Romania) Oana Gavrilă (Italy) Nicole Fossa Huergo (Bulgaria) Julia Stamatova
December 9	Heraklion, Greece; Clay; W15; Singles and Doubles Draws	(Bulgaria) Stela Peeva (United States) Chiara Scholl; 6–0, 6–3	(Ukraine) Mariia Bergen (Russia) Alina Lebedeva	(Italy) Martina Spigarelli (Russia) Polina Leykina	(Germany) Laura Schaeder (Romania) Oana Gavrilă (Italy) Nicole Fossa Huergo (Bulgaria) Julia Stamatova
December 9	Cancún, Mexico; Hard; W15; Singles and Doubles Draws	(Russia) Nika Kukharchuk; 6–1, 2–6, 6–2	(United States) Paige Cline	(Russia) Anastasia Sysoeva (Japan) Natsumi Kawaguchi	(Japan) Mio Mushika (Spain) Almudena Sanz-Llaneza Fernández (Canada) Sarah-Maude Fortin (United States) Elle Christensen
December 9	Cancún, Mexico; Hard; W15; Singles and Doubles Draws	(United States) Madison Appel (United States) Elle Christensen; Walkover	(Japan) Natsumi Kawaguchi (Russia) Nika Kukharchuk	(Russia) Anastasia Sysoeva (Japan) Natsumi Kawaguchi	(Japan) Mio Mushika (Spain) Almudena Sanz-Llaneza Fernández (Canada) Sarah-Maude Fortin (United States) Elle Christensen
December 9	Monastir, Tunisia; Hard; W15; Singles and Doubles Draws	(Japan) Yuriko Lily Miyazaki; 6–0, 6–3	(Russia) Yana Karpovich	(Finland) Anastasia Kulikova (United Kingdom) Alice Gillan	(France) Alice Ramé (Russia) Anastasia Pribylova (Italy) Angelica Raggi (Romania) Ilona Georgiana Ghioroaie
December 9	Monastir, Tunisia; Hard; W15; Singles and Doubles Draws	(Croatia) Mariana Dražić (Norway) Malene Helgø; 7–6^{(7–4)}, 6–1	(Spain) Yvonne Cavallé Reimers (Serbia) Bojana Marinković	(Finland) Anastasia Kulikova (United Kingdom) Alice Gillan	(France) Alice Ramé (Russia) Anastasia Pribylova (Italy) Angelica Raggi (Romania) Ilona Georgiana Ghioroaie
December 9	Antalya, Turkey; Hard; W15; Singles and Doubles Draws	Singles and doubles competition was abandoned due to ongoing poor weather		(Russia) Daria Kruzhkova (Russia) Ekaterina Kazionova (Turkey) Zeynep Sönmez (United Kingdom) Eliz Maloney	(Romania) Georgia Crăciun (Germany) Jantje Tilbürger (Japan) Misaki Matsuda (Austria) Mira Antonitsch
December 16	Navi Mumbai, India; Hard; W25; Singles and Doubles Draws	(Austria) Barbara Haas; 4–6, 6–2, 7–6^{(7–2)}	(South Korea) Jeong Su-nam	(Italy) Martina Caregaro (Russia) Olga Doroshina	(Russia) Amina Anshba (Russia) Valeria Savinykh (Thailand) Peangtarn Plipuech (India) Zeel Desai
December 16	Navi Mumbai, India; Hard; W25; Singles and Doubles Draws	(Chinese Taipei) Lee Pei-chi (Chinese Taipei) Wu Fang-hsien; 6–2, 6–2	(Russia) Olga Doroshina (Belarus) Shalimar Talbi	(Italy) Martina Caregaro (Russia) Olga Doroshina	(Russia) Amina Anshba (Russia) Valeria Savinykh (Thailand) Peangtarn Plipuech (India) Zeel Desai
December 16	Monastir, Tunisia; Hard; W15; Singles and Doubles Draws	(Romania) Ilona Georgiana Ghioroaie; 6–1, 6–4	(Russia) Anastasia Pribylova	(Spain) Jessica Bouzas Maneiro (Serbia) Bojana Marinković	(Spain) Yvonne Cavallé Reimers (Czech Republic) Anna Sisková (Norway) Malene Helgø (Croatia) Mariana Dražić
December 16	Monastir, Tunisia; Hard; W15; Singles and Doubles Draws	(Spain) Yvonne Cavallé Reimers (Serbia) Bojana Marinković; 5–7, 6–2, [11–9]	(Venezuela) Nadia Echeverría Alam (Italy) Aurora Zantedeschi	(Spain) Jessica Bouzas Maneiro (Serbia) Bojana Marinković	(Spain) Yvonne Cavallé Reimers (Czech Republic) Anna Sisková (Norway) Malene Helgø (Croatia) Mariana Dražić
December 16	Antalya, Turkey; Hard; W15; Singles and Doubles Draws	(Russia) Polina Kudermetova; 6–4, 3–6, 6–3	(Romania) Georgia Crăciun	(Russia) Valeriya Olyanovskaya (France) Sara Cakarevic	(Switzerland) Leonie Küng (Japan) Sakura Hosogi (Serbia) Mihaela Đaković (Russia) Veronika Pepelyaeva
December 16	Antalya, Turkey; Hard; W15; Singles and Doubles Draws	(Romania) Georgia Crăciun (Turkey) Başak Eraydın; 6–1, 6–2	(Turkey) Ayla Aksu (Turkey) Gizem Melisa Ateş	(Russia) Valeriya Olyanovskaya (France) Sara Cakarevic	(Switzerland) Leonie Küng (Japan) Sakura Hosogi (Serbia) Mihaela Đaković (Russia) Veronika Pepelyaeva
December 30	ITF Women's Circuit – Hong Kong; Hong Kong; Hard; W25; Singles and Doubles Draws	(Kazakhstan) Zarina Diyas; 6–4, 7–5	(China) Zhu Lin	(France) Harmony Tan (United States) Sachia Vickery	(Hungary) Réka Luca Jani (Czech Republic) Barbora Krejčíková (China) You Xiaodi (Georgia (country)) Ekaterine Gorgodze
December 30	ITF Women's Circuit – Hong Kong; Hong Kong; Hard; W25; Singles and Doubles Draws	(Hong Kong) Eudice Chong (Chinese Taipei) Wu Fang-hsien; 7–6^{(7–2)}, 6–1	(Japan) Moyuka Uchijima (China) Zhang Ying	(France) Harmony Tan (United States) Sachia Vickery	(Hungary) Réka Luca Jani (Czech Republic) Barbora Krejčíková (China) You Xiaodi (Georgia (country)) Ekaterine Gorgodze
