= 2019 Centenario Open =

- Date: 28 October–3 November 2019
- Edition: 1st
- Category: ITF Women's World Tennis Tour
- Prize money: $60,000
- Surface: Clay
- Location: Asunción, Paraguay

Champions

Singles
- (Italy) Elisabetta Cocciaretto

Doubles
- (Venezuela) Andrea Gámiz / (Spain) Georgina García Pérez
Centenario Open	· 2020 →

The 2019 Centenario Open was a professional tennis tournament played on outdoor clay courts. It was the first edition of the tournament which was part of the 2019 ITF Women's World Tennis Tour. It took place in Asunción, Paraguay between 28 October and 3 November 2019.

== Singles main-draw entrants ==
=== Seeds ===
Country	Player	Rank^{1}	Seed
PAR	Verónica Cepede Royg	140	1
USA	Allie Kiick	151	2
COL	Camila Osorio	214	3
SUI	Conny Perrin	218	4
EGY	Mayar Sherif	223	5
ITA	Sara Errani	239	6
GRE	Valentini Grammatikopoulou	248	7
GER	Katharina Gerlach	251	8

- ^{1} Rankings are as of 21 October 2019.

=== Other entrants ===
The following players received wildcards into the singles main draw:

- (Brazil) Carolina Alves
- (Paraguay) Susan Doldán
- (Paraguay) Lara Escauriza
- (Paraguay) Sarah Tami-Masi

The following players received entry from the qualifying draw:

- (Argentina) Victoria Bosio
- (Chile) Bárbara Gatica
- (Argentina) Guillermina Naya
- (Brazil) Thaisa Grana Pedretti
- (Brazil) Teliana Pereira
- (Brazil) Eduarda Piai
- (Brazil) Laura Pigossi
- (Norway) Melanie Stokke

== Champions ==
=== Singles ===
- (Italy) Elisabetta Cocciaretto def. (Italy) Sara Errani, 6–1, 4–6, 6–0

=== Doubles ===
- (Venezuela) Andrea Gámiz / (Spain) Georgina García Pérez def. (Kazakhstan) Anna Danilina / (Switzerland) Conny Perrin, 6–4, 3–6, [10–3]
