= 2019 Centenario Open – Doubles =

Doubles
- 2019 Centenario Open

Final
- Champions: (Venezuela) Andrea Gámiz (Spain) Georgina García Pérez
- Runners-up: (Kazakhstan) Anna Danilina (Switzerland) Conny Perrin
- Score: 6–4, 3–6, [10–3]

Events
Singles	Doubles
Centenario Open	· 2020 →

This was the first edition of the tournament.

Andrea Gámiz and Georgina García Pérez won the title, defeating Anna Danilina and Conny Perrin in the final, 6–4, 3–6, [10–3].

== Seeds ==
1. (Brazil) Laura Pigossi / (Brazil) Luisa Stefani (semifinals)
2. (Venezuela) Andrea Gámiz / (Spain) Georgina García Pérez (champions)
3. (Kazakhstan) Anna Danilina / (Switzerland) Conny Perrin (final)
4. (Brazil) Carolina Alves / (Brazil) Gabriela Cé (semifinals)

== Draw ==
=== Key ===
- Q = Qualifier
- WC = Wild card
- LL = Lucky loser
- Alt = Alternate
- SE = Special exempt
- PR = Protected ranking
- ITF = ITF entry
- JE = Junior exempt
- w/o = Walkover
- r = Retired
- d = Defaulted
- SR = Special ranking

=== Draw ===
First round
1	(Brazil) L Pigossi (Brazil) L Stefani	6	6
(United States) H Baptiste (United States) M Mateas	1	1
(Australia) S Mendez (Hungary) P Udvardy	6	6
WC	(Paraguay) LF Brítez Risso (Paraguay) S Tami-Masi	2	2
3	(Kazakhstan) A Danilina (Switzerland) C Perrin	2	7^{7}	[10]
(Colombia) C Osorio (Brazil) TG Pedretti	6	6^{5}	[4]
(Greece) D Papamichail (Argentina) N Podoroska	6	6
WC	(Colombia) E Arango (Paraguay) L Escauriza	4	1
(Chile) B Gatica (Brazil) R Pereira	3	1
WC	(United States) A Kiick (United States) L Raymond	6	6
(Italy) E Cocciaretto (Italy) S Errani	2	6	[5]
4	(Brazil) C Alves (Brazil) G Cé	6	4	[10]
(Spain) I Burillo Escorihuela (Mexico) AS Sánchez	5	6^{3}
(Greece) V Grammatikopoulou (Mexico) R Zarazúa	7	7^{7}
(Egypt) M Sherif (Norway) M Stokke	6	4	[5]
2	(Venezuela) A Gámiz (Spain) G García Pérez	4	6	[10]

Quarterfinals
1	(Brazil) L Pigossi (Brazil) L Stefani	6	2	[10]
(Australia) S Mendez (Hungary) P Udvardy	3	6	[6]
3	(Kazakhstan) A Danilina (Switzerland) C Perrin	6^{5}	6	[10]
(Greece) D Papamichail (Argentina) N Podoroska	7^{7}	2	[4]
WC	(United States) A Kiick (United States) L Raymond	3	7^{7}	[10]
4	(Brazil) C Alves (Brazil) G Cé	6	6^{2}	[12]
(Greece) V Grammatikopoulou (Mexico) R Zarazúa	5	6	[5]
2	(Venezuela) A Gámiz (Spain) G García Pérez	7	4	[10]

Semifinals
1	(Brazil) L Pigossi (Brazil) L Stefani	5	7^{7}	[6]
3	(Kazakhstan) A Danilina (Switzerland) C Perrin	7	6^{1}	[10]
4	(Brazil) C Alves (Brazil) G Cé	7	6^{3}	[8]
2	(Venezuela) A Gámiz (Spain) G García Pérez	5	7^{7}	[10]

Final
3	(Kazakhstan) A Danilina (Switzerland) C Perrin	4	6	[3]
2	(Venezuela) A Gámiz (Spain) G García Pérez	6	3	[10]
