= 2019 Centenario Open – Singles =

Singles
- 2019 Centenario Open

Final
- Champion: (Italy) Elisabetta Cocciaretto
- Runner-up: (Italy) Sara Errani
- Score: 6–1, 4–6, 6–0

Events
Singles	Doubles
- Centenario Open

This was the first edition of the tournament.

Elisabetta Cocciaretto won the title, defeating Sara Errani in an all-Italian final, 6–1, 4–6, 6–0.

== Seeds ==
1. (Paraguay) Verónica Cepede Royg (second round)
2. (United States) Allie Kiick (quarterfinals, retired)
3. (Colombia) Camila Osorio (semifinals)
4. (Switzerland) Conny Perrin (second round)
5. (Egypt) Mayar Sherif (first round)
6. (Italy) Sara Errani (final)
7. (Greece) Valentini Grammatikopoulou (first round)
8. (Germany) Katharina Gerlach (first round)

== Draw ==
Key

- Q = Qualifier
- WC = Wild card
- LL = Lucky loser
- Alt = Alternate
- ITF = ITF entry
- PR = Protected ranking
- SR = Special ranking
- SE = Special exempt
- JE = Junior exempt
- JR = Junior Accelerator Programme entrant
- CO = College Accelerator Programme entrant
- NG = Next Gen Accelerator Program entrant
- w/o = Walkover
- r = Retired
- d = Defaulted

=== Finals ===
Semifinals
Q	(Argentina) Guillermina Naya	6	2	2
(Italy) Elisabetta Cocciaretto	2	6	6
3	(Colombia) Camila Osorio	6	1	3
6	(Italy) Sara Errani	4	6	6

Final
(Italy) Elisabetta Cocciaretto	6	4	6
6	(Italy) Sara Errani	1	6	0

=== Top half ===
First round
1	(Paraguay) V Cepede Royg	5	7	6
(Australia) S Mendez	7	5	2
Q	(Argentina) G Naya	6	6
Q	(Brazil) TG Pedretti	1	4
(Spain) G García Pérez	5	2
(Chile) D Seguel	7	6
(Mexico) R Zarazúa	6	6
8	(Germany) K Gerlach	2	0
4	(Switzerland) C Perrin	6	6
Q	(Brazil) L Pigossi	1	2
(Italy) E Cocciaretto	6	3	6
Q	(Norway) M Stokke	4	6	4
Q	(Chile) B Gatica	6	6
(Greece) D Papamichail	3	1
(Brazil) G Cé	7^{8}	6^{6}	6
5	(Egypt) M Sherif	6^{6}	7^{8}	3

Second round
1	(Paraguay) V Cepede Royg	3	6^{3}
Q	(Argentina) G Naya	6	7^{7}
(Chile) D Seguel	6	5	4
(Mexico) R Zarazúa	4	7	6
4	(Switzerland) C Perrin	7	4	5
(Italy) E Cocciaretto	5	6	7
Q	(Chile) B Gatica	2	3
(Brazil) G Cé	6	6

Quarterfinals
Q	(Argentina) G Naya	7	2	6
(Mexico) R Zarazúa	5	6	2
(Italy) E Cocciaretto	6	6
(Brazil) G Cé	4	2

Semifinals
Q	(Argentina) G Naya	6	2	2
(Italy) E Cocciaretto	2	6	6

=== Bottom half ===
First round
7	(Greece) V Grammatikopoulou	3	2
Q	(Brazil) T Pereira	6	6
Q	(Brazil) E Piai	6	6
WC	(Paraguay) S Tami-Masi	1	0
WC	(Brazil) C Alves	4	7^{7}	7
(Argentina) N Podoroska	6	6^{2}	5
(Spain) I Burillo Escorihuela	4	4
3	(Colombia) C Osorio	6	6
6	(Italy) S Errani	6	6
(Mexico) AS Sánchez	2	1
(Kazakhstan) A Danilina	6	6
Q	(Argentina) V Bosio	1	2
(United States) H Baptiste	5	4
WC	(Paraguay) L Escauriza	7	6
WC	(Paraguay) S Doldán	1	2
2	(United States) A Kiick	6	6

Second round
Q	(Brazil) T Pereira	6	6
Q	(Brazil) E Piai	3	4
WC	(Brazil) C Alves	5	6	4
3	(Colombia) C Osorio	7	3	6
6	(Italy) S Errani	7^{7}	3	6
(Kazakhstan) A Danilina	6^{4}	6	0
WC	(Paraguay) L Escauriza	3	1
2	(United States) A Kiick	6	6

Quarterfinals
Q	(Brazil) T Pereira	3	6	5
3	(Colombia) C Osorio	6	3	7
6	(Italy) S Errani	1	6	3
2	(United States) A Kiick	6	1	1^{r}

Semifinals
3	(Colombia) C Osorio	6	1	3
6	(Italy) S Errani	4	6	6
