= Centenario Open =

ITF Women's Tour
- Event name: Centenario Open
- Location: Asunción, Paraguay
- Venue: Club Centenario
- Category: ITF Women's Circuit
- Surface: Clay
- Draw: 32S/32Q/16D
- Prize money: $60,000

The Centenario Open is a tournament for professional female tennis players played on outdoor clay courts. The event is classified as a $60,000 ITF Women's Circuit tournament and has been held in Asunción, Paraugay, since 2019.

== Past finals ==
=== Singles ===
Year	Champion	Runner-up	Score
2019	(Italy) Elisabetta Cocciaretto	(Italy) Sara Errani	6–1, 4–6, 6–0

=== Doubles ===
Year	Champions	Runners-up	Score
2019	(Venezuela) Andrea Gámiz (Spain) Georgina García Pérez	(Kazakhstan) Anna Danilina (Switzerland) Conny Perrin	6–4, 3–6, [10–3]
