= Andrea Gámiz =

Venezuelan tennis player (born 1992)

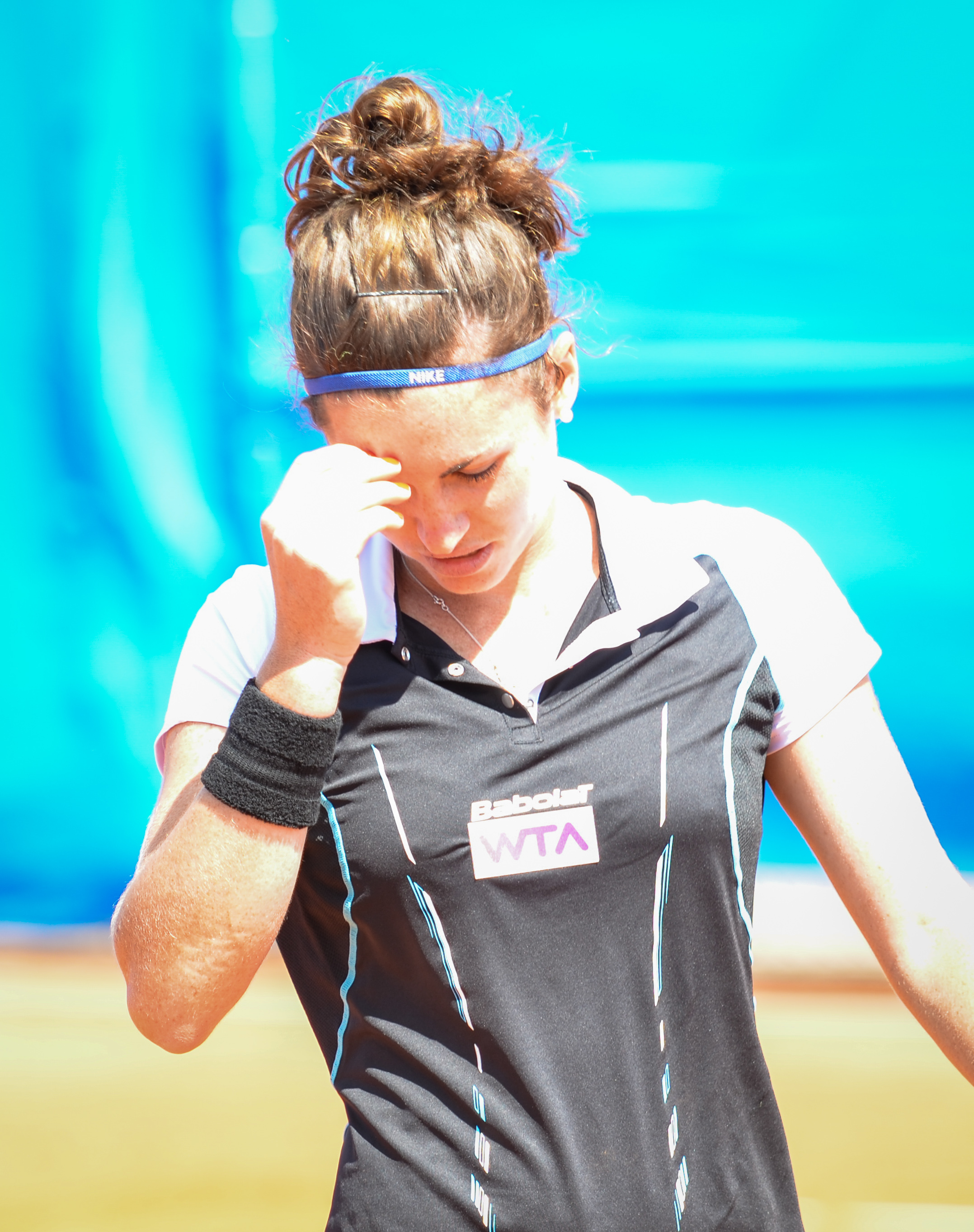
- Andrea Gámiz 2014 at the Nürnberger Versicherungscup
- Full name: Andrea Gámiz Pérez
- Country (sports): Venezuela
- Born: 31 October 1992 (age 34) Caracas
- Height: 1.62 m (5 ft 4 in)
- Turned pro: 2006
- Retired: 2025
- Plays: Right (two-handed backhand)
- Prize money: $320,614

Singles
- Career record: 428–320
- Career titles: 13 ITF
- Highest ranking: No. 244 (30 April 2018)

Doubles
- Career record: 344–229
- Career titles: 3 WTA 125, 41 ITF
- Highest ranking: No. 77 (26 June 2023)

Grand Slam doubles results
- French Open: 1R (2023)
- Wimbledon: 2R (2023)
- US Open: 1R (2023)

Team competitions
- Fed Cup: 36–22
Medal record
Women's tennis
Representing Venezuela
South American Games
Gold medal – first place	2014 Santiago	Doubles
Silver medal – second place	2010 Medellín	Doubles
Central American and Caribbean Games
Silver medal – second place	2014 Veracruz	Doubles
Silver medal – second place	2014 Veracruz	Team event

Andrea Gámiz Pérez (Latin American Spanish: [anˈdɾea ˈɣamis]; (Note: In isolation, Gámiz is pronounced [ˈɡamis].) born 31 October 1992) is a Venezuelan former professional tennis player.

Gámiz has been ranked by the WTA as high as No. 244 in singles (reached 30 April 2018) and No. 77 in doubles (26 June 2023). Gámiz has won three doubles titles on the WTA Challenger Tour as well as 13 singles and 41 doubles titles on the ITF Circuit.

Playing for the Venezuela Fed Cup team, Gámiz has a win–loss record of 36–22.

== Career ==
Playing alongside Eva Vedder, Gámiz reached her first WTA 125 doubles final at the 2022 Open Delle Puglie, losing to Elisabetta Cocciaretto and Olga Danilović.

Partnering with Aliona Bolsova, she won her maiden WTA 125 doubles title at the 2022 Țiriac Foundation Trophy, defeating Réka Luca Jani and Panna Udvardy in the final. They also won the 2023 San Luis Open Challenger, overcoming Oksana Kalashnikova and Katarzyna Piter in the final, and the 2023 Open Internacional de Valencia, where they beat Angelina Gabueva and Irina Khromacheva in a champions tiebreak.

Gámiz announced her retirement from professional tennis in November 2025.

== WTA Tour finals ==
=== Doubles: 1 (runner-up) ===
Legend WTA 250 (0–1)	Finals by surface Clay (0–1)

Result	Date	Tournament	Tier	Surface	Partner	Opponents	Score
Loss	Apr 2016	Copa Colsanitas, Colombia	International (Note: The WTA International tournaments were reclassified as WTA 250 tournaments in 2021.)	Clay	(Brazil) Gabriela Cé	(Spain) Lara Arruabarrena (Germany) Tatjana Maria	2–6, 6–4, [8–10]

== WTA 125 finals ==
=== Doubles: 4 (3 titles, 1 runner-up) ===
Result	W–L	Date	Tournament	Surface	Partner	Opponents	Score
Loss	0–1	Sep 2022	Bari Open, Italy	Clay	(Netherlands) Eva Vedder	(Italy) Elisabetta Cocciaretto (Serbia) Olga Danilović	2–6, 3–6
Win	1–1	Sep 2022	Open Romania Ladies	Clay	(Spain) Aliona Bolsova	(Hungary) Réka Luca Jani (Hungary) Panna Udvardy	7–5, 6–3
Win	2–1	Apr 2023	San Luis Open, Mexico	Clay	(Spain) Aliona Bolsova	(Georgia (country)) Oksana Kalashnikova (Poland) Katarzyna Piter	7–6^{(7–5)}, 6–4
Win	3–1	Jun 2023	Internacional de Valencia, Spain	Clay	(Spain) Aliona Bolsova	(Russia) Angelina Gabueva (Russia) Irina Khromacheva	6–4, 4–6, [10–7]

== ITF Circuit finals ==
=== Singles: 21 (13 titles, 8 runner-ups) ===
Legend $50,000 tournaments (0–1) $25,000 tournaments (2–1) $10/15,000 tournaments (11–6)	Finals by surface Hard (2–2) Clay (11–5) Carpet (0–1)

Result	W–L	Date	Tournament	Tier	Surface	Opponent	Score
Win	1–0	Dec 2009	ITF Quito, Ecuador	10,000	Clay	(Ecuador) Marie Elise Casares	6–1, 6–3
Loss	1–1	Sep 2010	ITF Caracas, Venezuela	10,000	Hard	(Venezuela) Adriana Pérez	3–6, 1–6
Win	2–1	Sep 2010	ITF Caracas, Venezuela	10,000	Hard	(Venezuela) Adriana Pérez	1–6, 6–4, 7–5
Loss	2–2	Oct 2010	ITF Seville, Spain	10,000	Clay	(Italy) Karin Knapp	0–6, 1–6
Win	3–2	Dec 2010	ITF Benicarló, Spain	10,000	Clay	(Italy) Anastasia Grymalska	3–6, 6–2, 6–4
Loss	3–3	Jun 2011	ITF Cantanhede, Portugal	10,000	Carpet	(Portugal) Magali de Lattre	2–6, 4–6
Loss	3–4	Jun 2011	ITF Montemor-o-Novo, Portugal	10,000	Clay	(Spain) Garbiñe Muguruza	4–6, 4–6
Win	4–4	Oct 2013	ITF Benicarló, Spain	10,000	Clay	(France) Jade Suvrijn	6–2, 6–0
Win	5–4	Jun 2014	ITF La Marsa, Tunisia	25,000	Clay	(Croatia) Tereza Mrdeža	3–6, 6–0, 6–4
Win	6–4	Sep 2014	ITF Vallduxo, Spain	10,000	Clay	(Spain) Lucia Cervera-Vazquez	6–1, 3–6, 6–3
Win	7–4	Oct 2014	ITF Benicarló, Spain	10,000	Clay	(Australia) Alexandra Nancarrow	6–3, 6–1
Loss	7–5	Jun 2015	Internazionali di Brescia, Italy	50,000	Clay	(Liechtenstein) Stephanie Vogt	6–7^{(3)}, 4–6
Loss	7–6	Oct 2015	ITF Rock Hill, United States	25,000	Hard	(United States) Jennifer Brady	5–7, 4–6
Loss	7–7	Nov 2015	ITF Nules, Spain	10,000	Clay	(Ukraine) Oleksandra Korashvili	4–6, 7–6^{(7)}, 6–7^{(3)}
Win	8–7	Aug 2016	ITF Las Palmas, Spain	10,000	Clay	(United Kingdom) Emily Arbuthnott	6–1, 6–1
Win	9–7	Nov 2016	ITF Vinaròs, Spain	10,000	Clay	(France) Jessika Ponchet	1–6, 6–1, 6–4
Loss	9–8	Dec 2016	ITF Castellón, Spain	10,000	Clay	(Australia) Isabelle Wallace	2–6, 1–6
Win	10–8	Mar 2017	ITF Hammamet, Tunisia	15,000	Clay	(France) Jade Suvrijn	6–1, 6–3
Win	11–8	Mar 2017	ITF Hammamet, Tunisia	15,000	Clay	(Spain) Yvonne Cavallé Reimers	6–2, 6–1
Win	12–8	Sep 2017	ITF Pula, Italy	25,000	Clay	(Croatia) Tereza Mrdeža	5–7, 7–5, 6–2
Win	13–8	Feb 2020	ITF Cancún, Mexico	W15	Hard	(Brazil) Carolina Alves	6–7^{(5)}, 7–5, 6–0

=== Doubles: 61 (41 titles, 20 runner-ups) ===
Legend W100 tournaments (0–2) W80 tournaments (1–0) W60 tournaments (5–1) W40 tournaments (2–1) W25/35 tournaments (24–10) W10/15 tournaments (9–6)	Finals by surface Hard (8–5) Clay (33–15)

Result	W–L	Date	Tournament	Tier	Surface	Partner	Opponents	Score
Win	1–0	Jul 2010	ITF Bogotá, Colombia	25,000	Clay	(Argentina) Paula Ormaechea	(Argentina) Mailen Auroux (Colombia) Karen Castiblanco	5–7, 6–4, [10–8]
Loss	1–1	Sep 2010	ITF Caracas, Venezuela	10,000	Hard	(Venezuela) Adriana Pérez	(Belgium) Gally De Wael (Austria) Nicole Rottmann	2–6, 6–1, 4–6
Win	2–1	Nov 2010	ITF La Vall d'Uixó, Spain	10,000	Clay	(United Kingdom) Amanda Carreras	(Spain) Lara Arruabarrena (Italy) Benedetta Davato	7–6^{(5)}, 6–3
Loss	2–2	Apr 2011	ITF Vic, Spain	10,000	Clay	(Greece) Despina Papamichail	(Czech Republic) Simona Dobrá (Czech Republic) Tereza Hladíková	2–6, 1–6
Win	3–2	Jun 2011	ITF Montemor-o-Novo, Portugal	10,000	Hard	(United Kingdom) Amanda Carreras	(Mexico) Ximena Hermoso (Mexico) Ivette López	6–3, 6–4
Win	4–2	Jul 2011	ITF Bogotá, Colombia	25,000	Clay	(Venezuela) Adriana Pérez	(United States) Julia Cohen (Chile) Andrea Koch Benvenuto	6–3, 6–4
Loss	4–3	Aug 2011	ITF Gijón, Spain	10,000	Hard	(United Kingdom) Amanda Carreras	(Republic of Ireland) Amy Bowtell (United Kingdom) Lucy Brown	w/o
Loss	4–4	Nov 2011	ITF Asunción, Paraguay	10,000	Clay	(Norway) Ulrikke Eikeri	(Argentina) Mailen Auroux (Argentina) María Irigoyen	1–6, 6–2, [5–10]
Loss	4–5	Nov 2012	ITF Benicarló, Spain	25,000	Clay	(Spain) Beatriz García Vidagany	(Switzerland) Conny Perrin (Slovenia) Maša Zec Peškirič	4–6, 3–6
Win	5–5	Apr 2013	ITF Torrent, Spain	10,000	Clay	(Argentina) Tatiana Búa	(Brazil) Yasmine Guimarães (Portugal) Rita Vilaça	6–1, 6–0
Win	6–5	Oct 2013	ITF Sant Cugat del Vallès, Spain	25,000	Clay	(Argentina) Tatiana Búa	(Spain) Lara Arruabarrena (United Kingdom) Amanda Carreras	4–6, 6–2, [10–7]
Loss	6–6	Apr 2014	ITF Namangan, Uzbekistan	25,000	Hard	(Russia) Yana Buchina	(Russia) Eugeniya Pashkova (Ukraine) Ganna Poznikhirenko	4–6, 1–6
Win	7–6	May 2014	Nana Trophy, Tunisia	25,000	Clay	(Russia) Valeria Savinykh	(Russia) Marina Melnikova (Spain) Beatriz García Vidagany	6–4, 6–1
Win	8–6	Jun 2014	ITF La Marsa, Tunisia	25,000	Clay	(Russia) Valeria Savinykh	(Switzerland) Xenia Knoll (Turkey) Pemra Özgen	1–6, 7–6^{(6)}, [11–9]
Win	9–6	Jun 2014	ITF Périgueux, France	25,000	Clay	(Spain) Sara Sorribes Tormo	(Brazil) Gabriela Cé (Argentina) Florencia Molinero	5–7, 6–4, [10–8]
Win	10–6	Sep 2014	ITF Vallduxo, Spain	10,000	Clay	(Spain) Olga Parres Azcoitia	(Italy) Alice Savoretti (Argentina) Tatiana Búa	6–2, 6–3
Win	11–6	Oct 2014	ITF Benicarló, Spain	10,000	Clay	(Spain) Aliona Bolsova	(Australia) Alexandra Nancarrow (Spain) Inés Ferrer Suárez	6–2, 6–3
Win	12–6	Nov 2014	ITF Castellon, Spain	10,000	Clay	(Spain) Aliona Bolsova	(Italy) Federica Arcidiacono (Italy) Martina Spigarelli	6–1, 6–2
Loss	12–7	Dec 2014	ITF Mérida, Mexico	25,000	Hard	(Russia) Valeria Savinykh	(Germany) Tatjana Maria (Mexico) Renata Zarazúa	4–6, 1–6
Loss	12–8	Feb 2015	ITF Campinas, Brazil	25,000	Clay	(Brazil) Paula Cristina Gonçalves	(France) Pauline Parmentier (Australia) Olivia Rogowska	5–7, 6–4, [8–10]
Win	13–8	Aug 2015	Ladies Open Hechingen, Germany	25,000	Clay	(Ukraine) Anastasiya Vasylyeva	(Germany) Vivian Heisen (Philippines) Katharina Lehnert	4–6, 7–6^{(4)}, [10–3]
Loss	13–9	Jun 2016	ITF Rome, Italy	25,000	Clay	(Hungary) Réka Luca Jani	(Italy) Claudia Giovine (Poland) Katarzyna Piter	3–6, 6–3, [7–10]
Win	14–9	Sep 2016	ITF Barcelona, Spain	25,000	Clay	(Spain) Georgina García Pérez	(Italy) Alice Matteucci (Switzerland) Jil Teichmann	6–2, 7–5
Loss	14–10	Nov 2016	ITF Vinaròs, Spain	10,000	Clay	(Ecuador) Charlotte Römer	(Ukraine) Oleksandra Korashvili (Romania) Ioana Loredana Roșca	4–6, 6–7^{(2)}
Win	15–10	Feb 2017	ITF Curitiba, Brazil	25,000	Clay	(Brazil) Gabriela Cé	(Brazil) Laura Pigossi (Switzerland) Jil Teichmann	4–6, 6–2, [10–2]
Loss	15–11	Mar 2017	ITF São Paulo, Brazil	25,000	Clay	(Brazil) Gabriela Cé	(Argentina) Catalina Pella (Chile) Daniela Seguel	5–7, 6–3, [5–10]
Win	16–11	Apr 2017	ITF Hammamet, Tunisia	15,000	Clay	(Brazil) Gabriela Cé	(France) Manon Arcangioli (France) Jessika Ponchet	6–1, 6–2
Win	17–11	May 2017	ITF Lleida, Spain	25,000	Clay	(Spain) Georgina García Pérez	(Belarus) Vera Lapko (Bulgaria) Aleksandrina Naydenova	6–1, 4–6, [10–8]
Win	18–11	May 2017	Torneo Conchita Martínez, Spain	25,000	Hard	(Spain) Georgina García Pérez	(Georgia (country)) Sofia Shapatava (Ukraine) Valeriya Strakhova	6–3, 6–4
Win	19–11	Jul 2017	ITF Getxo, Spain	25,000	Clay	(Bulgaria) Aleksandrina Naydenova	(Spain) Cristina Bucșa (Bolivia) Noelia Zeballos	6–2, 6–4
Win	20–11	Sep 2017	ITF Pula, Italy	25,000	Clay	(Germany) Lisa Ponomar	(Switzerland) Aline Thommen (Venezuela) Aymet Uzcátegui	5–7, 6–2, [10–6]
Loss	20–12	Oct 2017	ITF Seville, Spain	25,000	Clay	(Spain) Estrella Cabeza Candela	(Brazil) Luisa Stefani (Mexico) Renata Zarazúa	6–7^{(2)}, 6–7^{(3)}
Loss	20–13	Nov 2017	Open de Valencia, Spain	25,000	Clay	(Spain) Georgina García Pérez	(Spain) Cristina Bucșa (Russia) Yana Sizikova	6–7^{(1)}, 6–7^{(5)}
Loss	20–14	Feb 2018	ITF Hammamet, Tunisia	15,000	Clay	(Argentina) Guadalupe Pérez Rojas	(Serbia) Natalija Kostić (Bosnia and Herzegovina) Jelena Simić	w/o
Win	21–14	Jul 2018	ITF Figueira da Foz, Portugal	25,000+H	Hard	(Spain) Yvonne Cavallé Reimers	(Belarus) Sviatlana Pirazhenka (France) Jessika Ponchet	6–2, 7–5
Win	22–14	Sep 2018	Zagreb Ladies Open, Croatia	60,000	Clay	(Venezuela) Aymet Uzcátegui	(Romania) Elena Bogdan (Romania) Alexandra Cadanțu	6–3, 6–4
Win	23–14	Oct 2018	ITF Seville, Spain	25,000	Clay	(Argentina) Paula Ormaechea	(Turkey) Başak Eraydın (Russia) Anastasiya Komardina	7–5, 7–6^{(5)}
Win	24–14	Jun 2019	Internazionali di Brescia, Italy	W60	Clay	(Brazil) Paula Cristina Gonçalves	(Italy) Anastasia Grymalska (Italy) Giorgia Marchetti	6–3, 4–6, [12–10]
Win	25–14	Sep 2019	ITF Pula, Italy	W25	Clay	(Russia) Alina Charaeva	(Netherlands) Eva Vedder (Netherlands) Stephanie Visscher	7–6^{(1)}, 6–3
Loss	25–15	Sep 2019	Open de Valencia, Spain	W60+H	Clay	(Australia) Seone Mendez	(Spain) Rebeka Masarova (Romania) Irina Bara	4–6, 6–7^{(2)}
Win	26–15	Nov 2019	Asunción Open, Paraguay	W60	Clay	(Spain) Georgina García Pérez	(Kazakhstan) Anna Danilina (Switzerland) Conny Perrin	6–4, 3–6, [10–3]
Win	27–15	Feb 2020	ITF Cancún, Mexico	W15	Hard	(Brazil) Carolina Alves	(France) Tiphanie Fiquet (France) Léolia Jeanjean	5–7, 6–2, [11–9]
Win	28–15	Nov 2020	ITF Las Palmas, Spain	W15	Clay	(Argentina) Guillermina Naya	(Chile) Bárbara Gatica (Brazil) Rebeca Pereira	3–6, 7–5, [10–7]
Loss	28–16	Jul 2021	ITF Kyiv, Ukraine	W25	Hard	(United Kingdom) Ali Collins	(South Korea) Jang Su-jeong (Serbia) Bojana Marinković	6–3, 4–6, [7–10]
Win	29–16	Aug 2021	ITF Vrnjačka Banja, Serbia	W25	Clay	(Brazil) Carolina Alves	(Romania) Ioana Loredana Roșca (Egypt) Sandra Samir	6–4, 6–1
Win	30–16	Sep 2021	Open de Valencia, Spain	W80	Clay	(Spain) Aliona Bolsova	(Georgia (country)) Ekaterine Gorgodze (Brazil) Laura Pigossi	6–3, 6–4
Win	31–16	Oct 2021	ITF Lima, Peru	W25	Hard	(Brazil) Carolina Alves	(Mexico) Victoria Rodríguez (Netherlands) Bibiane Schoofs	6–3, 7–6^{(2)}
Win	32–16	Jan 2022	ITF Blumenau-Gaspar, Brazil	W25	Clay	(Chile) Bárbara Gatica	(United States) Sofia Sewing (Netherlands) Eva Vedder	6–4, 6–1
Win	33–16	Jan 2022	ITF Florianópolis, Brazil	W25	Hard	(United States) Sofia Sewing	(Chile) Bárbara Gatica (Brazil) Rebeca Pereira	6–4, 6–1
Win	34–16	Jan 2022	ITF Florianópolis, Brazil	W25	Hard	(United States) Sofia Sewing	(United States) Jessie Aney (Brazil) Ingrid Martins	7–6^{(2)}, 6–4
Loss	34–17	Feb 2022	ITF Tucumán, Argentina	W25	Clay	(Argentina) Paula Ormaechea	(Chile) Bárbara Gatica (Brazil) Rebeca Pereira	3–6, 5–7
Win	35–17	Mar 2022	ITF Guayaquil, Ecuador	W25	Hard	(United States) Sofia Sewing	(Italy) Nicole Fossa Huergo (Bolivia) Noelia Zeballos	6–4, 7–5
Loss	35–18	May 2022	Wiesbaden Open, Germany	W100	Clay	(Netherlands) Eva Vedder	(Russia) Amina Anshba (Hungary) Panna Udvardy	2–6, 4–6
Win	36–18	May 2022	ITF Platja d'Aro, Spain	W25	Clay	(Spain) Ángela Fita Boluda	(Netherlands) Isabelle Haverlag (Ukraine) Valeriya Strakhova	6–4, 3–6, [10–3]
Win	37–18	Jul 2022	Open de Montpellier, France	W60	Clay	(Spain) Andrea Lázaro García	(France) Estelle Cascino (Russia) Irina Khromacheva	6–4, 2–6, [13–11]
Win	38–18	Jul 2022	Internazionali di Roma, Italy	W60+H	Clay	(Netherlands) Eva Vedder	(France) Estelle Cascino (Italy) Camilla Rosatello	7–5, 2–6, [13–11]
Loss	38–19	Mar 2023	ITF Anapoima, Colombia	W40	Clay	(Netherlands) Eva Vedder	(Russia) Irina Khromacheva (Ukraine) Valeriya Strakhova	0–6, 6–1, [4–10]
Win	39–19	Jul 2023	ITF Palma del Río, Spain	W40	Hard	(United States) Sofia Sewing	(United States) Robin Anderson (Australia) Elysia Bolton	6–3, 6–2
Win	40–19	Oct 2023	Lisboa Belém Open, Portugal	W40	Clay	(Netherlands) Eva Vedder	(Germany) Tayisiya Morderger (Germany) Yana Morderger	6–1, 6–2
Win	41–19	May 2024	ITF Pula, Italy	W35	Clay	(Netherlands) Eva Vedder	(Finland) Laura Hietaranta (Greece) Sapfo Sakellaridi	2–6, 6–2, [10–4]
Loss	41–20	May 2024	Open Villa de Madrid, Spain	W100	Clay	(Netherlands) Eva Vedder	(Australia) Destanee Aiava (Greece) Eleni Christofi	3–6, 6–2, [5–10]
