= 2021 ITF Women's World Tennis Tour (October–December) =

The 2021 ITF Women's World Tennis Tour is the 2021 edition of the second-tier tour for women's professional tennis. It is organised by the International Tennis Federation and is a tier below the WTA Tour. The ITF Women's World Tennis Tour includes tournaments with prize money ranging from $15,000 up to $100,000.

== Key ==
Category
W100 tournaments
W80 tournaments
W60 tournaments
W25 tournaments
W15 tournaments

== Month ==
=== October ===
Week of	Tournament	Winner	Runners-up	Semifinalists	Quarterfinalists
October 4	Henderson Tennis Open; Las Vegas, United States; Hard; W60; Singles Draw – Doubles Draw	(United States) Emina Bektas; 6–1, 6–1	(Japan) Yuriko Lily Miyazaki	(United States) Hanna Chang (United States) Chanelle Van Nguyen	(Mexico) Marcela Zacarías (United Kingdom) Tara Moore (United States) Dalayna Hewitt (United States) Allie Kiick
October 4	Henderson Tennis Open; Las Vegas, United States; Hard; W60; Singles Draw – Doubles Draw	(United States) Quinn Gleason (Slovakia) Tereza Mihalíková; 7–6^{(7–5)}, 7–5	(United States) Emina Bektas (United Kingdom) Tara Moore	(United States) Hanna Chang (United States) Chanelle Van Nguyen	(Mexico) Marcela Zacarías (United Kingdom) Tara Moore (United States) Dalayna Hewitt (United States) Allie Kiick
October 4	Cherbourg-en-Cotentin, France; Hard (indoor); W25+H; Singles and Doubles Draws	(France) Clara Burel; 6–4, 6–2	(France) Émeline Dartron	(Netherlands) Arianne Hartono (Poland) Martyna Kubka	(Belarus) Iryna Shymanovich (Ukraine) Daria Snigur (Netherlands) Indy de Vroome (France) Alice Ramé
October 4	Cherbourg-en-Cotentin, France; Hard (indoor); W25+H; Singles and Doubles Draws	(United Kingdom) Sarah Beth Grey (Netherlands) Arianne Hartono; 6–3, 6–2	(France) Estelle Cascino (Italy) Camilla Rosatello	(Netherlands) Arianne Hartono (Poland) Martyna Kubka	(Belarus) Iryna Shymanovich (Ukraine) Daria Snigur (Netherlands) Indy de Vroome (France) Alice Ramé
October 4	Lima, Peru; Clay; W25; Singles and Doubles Draws	(Czech Republic) Anna Sisková; 3–6, 7–5, 6–0	(Bosnia and Herzegovina) Dea Herdželaš	(Brazil) Carolina Alves (Germany) Alexandra Vecic	(France) Amandine Hesse (Netherlands) Bibiane Schoofs (Argentina) María Lourdes Carlé (Turkey) Çağla Büyükakçay
October 4	Lima, Peru; Clay; W25; Singles and Doubles Draws	(Brazil) Carolina Alves (Venezuela) Andrea Gámiz; 6–3, 7–6^{(7–2)}	(Mexico) Victoria Rodríguez (Netherlands) Bibiane Schoofs	(Brazil) Carolina Alves (Germany) Alexandra Vecic	(France) Amandine Hesse (Netherlands) Bibiane Schoofs (Argentina) María Lourdes Carlé (Turkey) Çağla Büyükakçay
October 4	Loulé, Portugal; Hard; W25; Singles and Doubles Draws	(France) Harmony Tan; 6–4, 6–4	(Australia) Ellen Perez	(France) Chloé Paquet (Belarus) Anna Kubareva	(Serbia) Natalija Stevanović (Switzerland) Simona Waltert (Spain) Ángela Fita Boluda (Spain) Marina Bassols Ribera
October 4	Loulé, Portugal; Hard; W25; Singles and Doubles Draws	(Greece) Despina Papamichail (Serbia) Natalija Stevanović; 6–2, 7–5	(Portugal) Francisca Jorge (Portugal) Matilde Jorge	(France) Chloé Paquet (Belarus) Anna Kubareva	(Serbia) Natalija Stevanović (Switzerland) Simona Waltert (Spain) Ángela Fita Boluda (Spain) Marina Bassols Ribera
October 4	Redding, United States; Hard; W25; Singles and Doubles Draws	(United States) Catherine Harrison; 6–1, 6–1	(Slovenia) Dalila Jakupović	(United Kingdom) Katie Swan (China) Lu Jiajing	(United States) Victoria Duval (India) Pranjala Yadlapalli (Australia) Olivia Tjandramulia (Sweden) Mirjam Björklund
October 4	Redding, United States; Hard; W25; Singles and Doubles Draws	(Sweden) Mirjam Björklund (United Kingdom) Katie Swan; 6–3, 1–6, [10–3]	(Slovenia) Dalila Jakupović (China) Lu Jiajing	(United Kingdom) Katie Swan (China) Lu Jiajing	(United States) Victoria Duval (India) Pranjala Yadlapalli (Australia) Olivia Tjandramulia (Sweden) Mirjam Björklund
October 4	Sozopol, Bulgaria; Hard; W15; Singles and Doubles Draws	(South Korea) Ku Yeon-woo; 6–4, 6–2	(Bulgaria) Julia Terziyska	(United Kingdom) Anna Brogan (Bulgaria) Denislava Glushkova	(Romania) Oana Gavrilă (Denmark) Sofia Samavati (Turkey) İlay Yörük (Romania) Briana Szabó
October 4	Sozopol, Bulgaria; Hard; W15; Singles and Doubles Draws	(Bulgaria) Katerina Dimitrova (Romania) Oana Gavrilă; 3–6, 6–4, [10–1]	(Bulgaria) Julia Terziyska (Bulgaria) Gergana Topalova	(United Kingdom) Anna Brogan (Bulgaria) Denislava Glushkova	(Romania) Oana Gavrilă (Denmark) Sofia Samavati (Turkey) İlay Yörük (Romania) Briana Szabó
October 4	Sharm El Sheikh, Egypt; Hard; W15; Singles and Doubles Draws	(Germany) Lena Ruppert; 6–1, 6–0	(Romania) Arina Vasilescu	(Canada) Carson Branstine (Japan) Eri Shimizu	(Germany) Silvia Ambrosio (Czech Republic) Ivana Šebestová (China) Wang Xintong (Austria) Tamara Kostic
October 4	Sharm El Sheikh, Egypt; Hard; W15; Singles and Doubles Draws	(China) Bai Zhuoxuan (Thailand) Punnin Kovapitukted; 6–0, 6–4	(India) Ashmitha Easwaramurthi (Hungary) Rebeka Stolmár	(Canada) Carson Branstine (Japan) Eri Shimizu	(Germany) Silvia Ambrosio (Czech Republic) Ivana Šebestová (China) Wang Xintong (Austria) Tamara Kostic
October 4	Cancún, Mexico; Hard; W15; Singles and Doubles Draws	(Latvia) Darja Semenistaja; 5–7, 7–6^{(7–5)}, 6–0	(Mexico) María José Portillo Ramírez	(Canada) Stacey Fung (United States) Paris Corley	(Switzerland) Sandy Marti (United States) Christina Rosca (United States) Taylor Ng (Colombia) Yuliana Monroy
October 4	Cancún, Mexico; Hard; W15; Singles and Doubles Draws	(United States) Anna Rogers (United States) Christina Rosca; 6–3, 6–1	(Canada) Louise Kwong (United States) Anna Ulyashchenko	(Canada) Stacey Fung (United States) Paris Corley	(Switzerland) Sandy Marti (United States) Christina Rosca (United States) Taylor Ng (Colombia) Yuliana Monroy
October 4	Monastir, Tunisia; Hard; W15; Singles and Doubles Draws	(Switzerland) Sebastianna Scilipoti; 6–3, 6–1	(Switzerland) Tess Sugnaux	(Croatia) Petra Marčinko (Thailand) Anchisa Chanta	(Tunisia) Chiraz Bechri (Thailand) Pimrada Jattavapornvanit (Netherlands) Anouk Koevermans (China) Ma Yexin
October 4	Monastir, Tunisia; Hard; W15; Singles and Doubles Draws	(China) Ma Yexin (China) Ni Ma Zhuoma; 3–6, 6–4, [10–7]	(Croatia) Petra Marčinko (Switzerland) Sebastianna Scilipoti	(Croatia) Petra Marčinko (Thailand) Anchisa Chanta	(Tunisia) Chiraz Bechri (Thailand) Pimrada Jattavapornvanit (Netherlands) Anouk Koevermans (China) Ma Yexin
October 4	Hilton Head Island, United States; Hard; W15; Singles and Doubles Draws	(United States) Katerina Stewart; 6–4, 6–2	(United States) Raveena Kingsley	(United States) Elizabeth Scotty (Poland) Ania Hertel	(United States) Madison Hill (Latvia) Līga Dekmeijere (United States) Katja Wiersholm (Latvia) Denīza Marcinkēviča
October 4	Hilton Head Island, United States; Hard; W15; Singles and Doubles Draws	(United States) Katerina Stewart (Russia) Anastasia Sysoeva; Walkover	(Austria) Emily Meyer (Spain) María Aran Teixidó García	(United States) Elizabeth Scotty (Poland) Ania Hertel	(United States) Madison Hill (Latvia) Līga Dekmeijere (United States) Katja Wiersholm (Latvia) Denīza Marcinkēviča
October 11	Rancho Santa Fe Open; Rancho Santa Fe, United States; Hard; W60; Singles Draw – Doubles Draw	(Sweden) Rebecca Peterson; 6–4, 6–0	(United States) Elvina Kalieva	(United States) Madison Brengle (France) Fiona Ferro	(Australia) Lizette Cabrera (Ukraine) Kateryna Kozlova (Slovenia) Polona Hercog (Slovakia) Kristína Kučová
October 11	Rancho Santa Fe Open; Rancho Santa Fe, United States; Hard; W60; Singles Draw – Doubles Draw	(Poland) Katarzyna Kawa (Slovakia) Tereza Mihalíková; 6–3, 4–6, [10–6]	(Chinese Taipei) Liang En-shuo (Canada) Rebecca Marino	(United States) Madison Brengle (France) Fiona Ferro	(Australia) Lizette Cabrera (Ukraine) Kateryna Kozlova (Slovenia) Polona Hercog (Slovakia) Kristína Kučová
October 11	Lima, Peru; Clay; W25; Singles and Doubles Draws	(Bosnia and Herzegovina) Dea Herdželaš; 6–2, 6–2	(Germany) Katharina Gerlach	(Brazil) Carolina Alves (France) Amandine Hesse	(Hungary) Panna Udvardy (Czech Republic) Anna Sisková (Argentina) María Lourdes Carlé (Brazil) Laura Pigossi
October 11	Lima, Peru; Clay; W25; Singles and Doubles Draws	(Argentina) María Lourdes Carlé (Brazil) Laura Pigossi; 6–1, 6–1	(Colombia) María Paulina Pérez (Colombia) Jessica Plazas	(Brazil) Carolina Alves (France) Amandine Hesse	(Hungary) Panna Udvardy (Czech Republic) Anna Sisková (Argentina) María Lourdes Carlé (Brazil) Laura Pigossi
October 11	Lagos, Portugal; Hard; W25; Singles and Doubles Draws	(Croatia) Antonia Ružić; 6–1, 6–4	(Bulgaria) Isabella Shinikova	(Greece) Despina Papamichail (Czech Republic) Jesika Malečková	(United Kingdom) Naiktha Bains (Switzerland) Simona Waltert (Australia) Ellen Perez (France) Jessika Ponchet
October 11	Lagos, Portugal; Hard; W25; Singles and Doubles Draws	(Latvia) Diāna Marcinkēviča (China) Yuan Yue; Walkover	(Czech Republic) Miriam Kolodziejová (Czech Republic) Jesika Malečková	(Greece) Despina Papamichail (Czech Republic) Jesika Malečková	(United Kingdom) Naiktha Bains (Switzerland) Simona Waltert (Australia) Ellen Perez (France) Jessika Ponchet
October 11	Florence, United States; Hard; W25; Singles and Doubles Draws	(Colombia) Emiliana Arango; 6–3, 0–6, 7–6^{(7–0)}	(China) Wang Xiyu	(France) Tessah Andrianjafitrimo (United States) Maria Mateas	(United States) Amy Zhu (Romania) Gabriela Lee (United States) Katie Volynets (United States) Robin Anderson
October 11	Florence, United States; Hard; W25; Singles and Doubles Draws	(United Kingdom) Emily Appleton (Japan) Yuriko Lily Miyazaki; 6–3, 1–6, [10–8]	(United States) Robin Anderson (United States) Elysia Bolton	(France) Tessah Andrianjafitrimo (United States) Maria Mateas	(United States) Amy Zhu (Romania) Gabriela Lee (United States) Katie Volynets (United States) Robin Anderson
October 11	Piracicaba, Brazil; Clay; W15; Singles and Doubles Draws	(Italy) Miriana Tona; 6–1, 6–2	(Germany) Luisa Meyer auf der Heide	(Argentina) Victoria Bosio (United States) Sabastiani León	(Brazil) Juliana Munhoz (United States) Madison Bourguignon (United States) Tara Malik (Chile) Fernanda Astete
October 11	Piracicaba, Brazil; Clay; W15; Singles and Doubles Draws	(United States) Sabastiani León (Germany) Luisa Meyer auf der Heide; 6–2, 3–0, ret.	(Chile) Fernanda Astete (Argentina) Victoria Bosio	(Argentina) Victoria Bosio (United States) Sabastiani León	(Brazil) Juliana Munhoz (United States) Madison Bourguignon (United States) Tara Malik (Chile) Fernanda Astete
October 11	Sozopol, Bulgaria; Hard; W15; Singles and Doubles Draws	(Slovenia) Nastja Kolar; 7–5, 3–6, 6–1	(Greece) Martha Matoula	(Bulgaria) Julia Terziyska (South Korea) Ku Yeon-woo	(Slovakia) Radka Zelníčková (Denmark) Sofia Samavati (France) Séléna Janicijevic (France) Océane Babel
October 11	Sozopol, Bulgaria; Hard; W15; Singles and Doubles Draws	(Romania) Oana Gavrilă (Germany) Emily Seibold; 6–0, 6–2	(Slovenia) Nastja Kolar (Bulgaria) Ani Vangelova	(Bulgaria) Julia Terziyska (South Korea) Ku Yeon-woo	(Slovakia) Radka Zelníčková (Denmark) Sofia Samavati (France) Séléna Janicijevic (France) Océane Babel
October 11	Sharm El Sheikh, Egypt; Hard; W15; Singles and Doubles Draws	(China) Bai Zhuoxuan; 6–3, 6–2	(United Kingdom) Emilie Lindh	(Japan) Eri Shimizu (Hong Kong) Wu Ho-ching	(Egypt) Sandra Samir (Netherlands) Demi Tran (Romania) Elena-Teodora Cadar (Germany) Silvia Ambrosio
October 11	Sharm El Sheikh, Egypt; Hard; W15; Singles and Doubles Draws	(Hong Kong) Eudice Chong (Hong Kong) Cody Wong; 6–2, 6–4	(Czech Republic) Karolína Vlčková (China) Wang Jiaqi	(Japan) Eri Shimizu (Hong Kong) Wu Ho-ching	(Egypt) Sandra Samir (Netherlands) Demi Tran (Romania) Elena-Teodora Cadar (Germany) Silvia Ambrosio
October 11	Cancún, Mexico; Hard; W15; Singles and Doubles Draws	(Latvia) Darja Semenistaja; 7–5, 7–5	(United States) Rachel Gailis	(United States) Madison Sieg (United States) Pamela Montez	(United States) Hina Inoue (Colombia) Yuliana Monroy (Canada) Stacey Fung (United States) Anna Rogers
October 11	Cancún, Mexico; Hard; W15; Singles and Doubles Draws	(Latvia) Darja Semenistaja (United States) Anna Ulyashchenko; 6–4, 6–4	(Venezuela) Nadia Echeverría Alam (United States) Rushri Wijesundera	(United States) Madison Sieg (United States) Pamela Montez	(United States) Hina Inoue (Colombia) Yuliana Monroy (Canada) Stacey Fung (United States) Anna Rogers
October 11	Kazan Open; Kazan, Russia; Hard (indoor); W15; Singles and Doubles Draws	(Russia) Daria Kudashova; 6–2, 5–7, 6–1	(Russia) Ekaterina Maklakova	(Russia) Varvara Altukhova (Russia) Ekaterina Ovcharenko	(Russia) Viktoriia Kalinina (Russia) Alina Korneeva (Russia) Elena Pridankina (Russia) Angelika Shapovalova
October 11	Kazan Open; Kazan, Russia; Hard (indoor); W15; Singles and Doubles Draws	(Russia) Ekaterina Maklakova (Russia) Aleksandra Pospelova; 6–1, 6–1	(Russia) Maria Krupenina (Russia) Ekaterina Ovcharenko	(Russia) Varvara Altukhova (Russia) Ekaterina Ovcharenko	(Russia) Viktoriia Kalinina (Russia) Alina Korneeva (Russia) Elena Pridankina (Russia) Angelika Shapovalova
October 11	Monastir, Tunisia; Hard; W15; Singles and Doubles Draws	(Austria) Tamira Paszek; 6–2, 6–3	(Japan) Natsumi Kawaguchi	(Italy) Federica Rossi (China) Ma Yexin	(Serbia) Mihaela Đaković (Germany) Mara Guth (Croatia) Petra Marčinko (Germany) Chantal Sauvant
October 11	Monastir, Tunisia; Hard; W15; Singles and Doubles Draws	(France) Yasmine Mansouri (Austria) Tamira Paszek; 6–1, 6–1	(Germany) Laura Böhner (Serbia) Mihaela Đaković	(Italy) Federica Rossi (China) Ma Yexin	(Serbia) Mihaela Đaković (Germany) Mara Guth (Croatia) Petra Marčinko (Germany) Chantal Sauvant
October 11	Antalya, Turkey; Clay; W15; Singles and Doubles Draws	(Spain) Rosa Vicens Mas; 6–1, 2–6, 6–3	(United Kingdom) Sonay Kartal	(Romania) Sabina Dădaciu (Russia) Polina Iatcenko	(Austria) Mavie Österreicher (Sweden) Vanessa Ersöz (Sweden) Kajsa Rinaldo Persson (Germany) Natalia Siedliska
October 11	Antalya, Turkey; Clay; W15; Singles and Doubles Draws	(Hungary) Dorka Drahota-Szabó (Hungary) Amarissa Kiara Tóth; 6–3, 2–6, [10–4]	(Slovakia) Romana Čisovská (Hungary) Adrienn Nagy	(Romania) Sabina Dădaciu (Russia) Polina Iatcenko	(Austria) Mavie Österreicher (Sweden) Vanessa Ersöz (Sweden) Kajsa Rinaldo Persson (Germany) Natalia Siedliska
October 11	Norman, United States; Hard; W15; Singles and Doubles Draws	(United States) Raveena Kingsley; 6–2, 6–0	(Canada) Annabelle Xu	(Italy) Martina Zerulo (United States) Ivana Corley	(Israel) Tamara Barad Itzhaki (Ukraine) Alexandra Pisareva (Peru) Dana Guzmán (United States) Elizabeth Coleman
October 11	Norman, United States; Hard; W15; Singles and Doubles Draws	(Finland) Oona Orpana (Italy) Martina Zerulo; 6–2, 5–7, [10–6]	(United States) McKenna Schaefbauer (Dominican Republic) Kelly Williford	(Italy) Martina Zerulo (United States) Ivana Corley	(Israel) Tamara Barad Itzhaki (Ukraine) Alexandra Pisareva (Peru) Dana Guzmán (United States) Elizabeth Coleman
October 18	Tennis Classic of Macon; Macon, United States; Hard; W80; Singles Draw – Doubles Draw	(United States) Madison Brengle; 6–4, 4–6, 6–4	(Kazakhstan) Zarina Diyas	(China) Wang Xiyu (Brazil) Beatriz Haddad Maia	(United States) Louisa Chirico (United States) Catherine Harrison (Mexico) Renata Zarazúa (United States) Victoria Duval
October 18	Tennis Classic of Macon; Macon, United States; Hard; W80; Singles Draw – Doubles Draw	(United States) Quinn Gleason (United States) Catherine Harrison; 6–2, 6–2	(United States) Alycia Parks (United States) Alana Smith	(China) Wang Xiyu (Brazil) Beatriz Haddad Maia	(United States) Louisa Chirico (United States) Catherine Harrison (Mexico) Renata Zarazúa (United States) Victoria Duval
October 18	Rio do Sul, Brazil; Clay; W25; Singles and Doubles Draws	(Hungary) Panna Udvardy; 6–1, 6–0	(Chile) Daniela Seguel	(Brazil) Carolina Alves (Brazil) Laura Pigossi	(Chile) Bárbara Gatica (Germany) Katharina Gerlach (Argentina) María Lourdes Carlé (Argentina) Jazmín Ortenzi
October 18	Rio do Sul, Brazil; Clay; W25; Singles and Doubles Draws	(Germany) Katharina Gerlach (Chile) Daniela Seguel; 7–6^{(10–8)}, 6–3	(Chile) Bárbara Gatica (Brazil) Rebeca Pereira	(Brazil) Carolina Alves (Brazil) Laura Pigossi	(Chile) Bárbara Gatica (Germany) Katharina Gerlach (Argentina) María Lourdes Carlé (Argentina) Jazmín Ortenzi
October 18	Hamburg, Germany; Hard (indoor); W25; Singles and Doubles Draws	(Croatia) Antonia Ružić; 6–2, 4–1, ret.	(Hungary) Tímea Babos	(France) Mallaurie Noël (Switzerland) Susan Bandecchi	(France) Océane Dodin (France) Margaux Rouvroy (France) Jessika Ponchet (Liechtenstein) Kathinka von Deichmann
October 18	Hamburg, Germany; Hard (indoor); W25; Singles and Doubles Draws	(Latvia) Kamilla Bartone (Switzerland) Ylena In-Albon; 6–4, 6–3	(Australia) Olivia Gadecki (Burundi) Sada Nahimana	(France) Mallaurie Noël (Switzerland) Susan Bandecchi	(France) Océane Dodin (France) Margaux Rouvroy (France) Jessika Ponchet (Liechtenstein) Kathinka von Deichmann
October 18	Netanya, Israel; Hard; W25; Singles and Doubles Draws	(France) Chloé Paquet; 6–3, 6–3	(United Kingdom) Matilda Mutavdzic	(Sweden) Fanny Östlund (Mexico) Ana Sofía Sánchez	(Israel) Shavit Kimchi (Israel) Lina Glushko (France) Carole Monnet (Netherlands) Quirine Lemoine
October 18	Netanya, Israel; Hard; W25; Singles and Doubles Draws	(Israel) Lina Glushko (Israel) Shavit Kimchi; 6–4, 6–2	(Czech Republic) Linda Nosková (Sweden) Fanny Östlund	(Sweden) Fanny Östlund (Mexico) Ana Sofía Sánchez	(Israel) Shavit Kimchi (Israel) Lina Glushko (France) Carole Monnet (Netherlands) Quirine Lemoine
October 18	Karaganda, Kazakhstan; Hard (indoor); W25; Singles and Doubles Draws	(Belarus) Yuliya Hatouka; 7–5, 6–0	(Russia) Ekaterina Kazionova	(Switzerland) Valentina Ryser (Russia) Ekaterina Makarova	(Estonia) Elena Malõgina (Russia) Ekaterina Maklakova (Russia) Ekaterina Reyngold (Uzbekistan) Nigina Abduraimova
October 18	Karaganda, Kazakhstan; Hard (indoor); W25; Singles and Doubles Draws	(Poland) Martyna Kubka (Kazakhstan) Zhibek Kulambayeva; 7–5, 6–4	(Serbia) Tamara Čurović (Estonia) Elena Malõgina	(Switzerland) Valentina Ryser (Russia) Ekaterina Makarova	(Estonia) Elena Malõgina (Russia) Ekaterina Maklakova (Russia) Ekaterina Reyngold (Uzbekistan) Nigina Abduraimova
October 18	Seville, Spain; Clay; W25; Singles and Doubles Draws	(France) Diane Parry; 6–2, 6–0	(Russia) Elina Avanesyan	(Romania) Andreea Roșca (North Macedonia) Lina Gjorcheska	(Croatia) Tara Würth (Spain) Leyre Romero Gormaz (Bulgaria) Isabella Shinikova (Croatia) Tena Lukas
October 18	Seville, Spain; Clay; W25; Singles and Doubles Draws	(Sweden) Caijsa Hennemann (South Korea) Ku Yeon-woo; 7–5, 6–1	(North Macedonia) Lina Gjorcheska (Croatia) Tena Lukas	(Romania) Andreea Roșca (North Macedonia) Lina Gjorcheska	(Croatia) Tara Würth (Spain) Leyre Romero Gormaz (Bulgaria) Isabella Shinikova (Croatia) Tena Lukas
October 18	Sharm El Sheikh, Egypt; Hard; W15; Singles and Doubles Draws	(China) Bai Zhuoxuan; 6–4, 6–3	(China) Li Zongyu	(United Kingdom) Emilie Lindh (Thailand) Punnin Kovapitukted	(Egypt) Sandra Samir (Romania) Elena-Teodora Cadar (Germany) Silvia Ambrosio (Hong Kong) Wu Ho-ching
October 18	Sharm El Sheikh, Egypt; Hard; W15; Singles and Doubles Draws	(Hong Kong) Eudice Chong (Hong Kong) Cody Wong; 6–2, 6–0	(Japan) Eri Shimizu (Hong Kong) Wu Ho-ching	(United Kingdom) Emilie Lindh (Thailand) Punnin Kovapitukted	(Egypt) Sandra Samir (Romania) Elena-Teodora Cadar (Germany) Silvia Ambrosio (Hong Kong) Wu Ho-ching
October 18	Monastir, Tunisia; Hard; W15; Singles and Doubles Draws	(Thailand) Luksika Kumkhum; 6–2, 6–2	(India) Jennifer Luikham	(Germany) Mara Guth (Switzerland) Nadine Keller	(Serbia) Elena Milovanović (Tunisia) Chiraz Bechri (Italy) Arianna Zucchini (Italy) Chiara Catini
October 18	Monastir, Tunisia; Hard; W15; Singles and Doubles Draws	(Japan) Natsuho Arakawa (Thailand) Luksika Kumkhum; 6–4, 6–2	(Japan) Mana Ayukawa (Austria) Tamira Paszek	(Germany) Mara Guth (Switzerland) Nadine Keller	(Serbia) Elena Milovanović (Tunisia) Chiraz Bechri (Italy) Arianna Zucchini (Italy) Chiara Catini
October 18	Antalya, Turkey; Clay; W15; Singles and Doubles Draws	(United Kingdom) Sonay Kartal; 7–5, 7–5	(Hungary) Amarissa Kiara Tóth	(Italy) Deborah Chiesa (Hungary) Dorka Drahota-Szabó	(Spain) Rosa Vicens Mas (Bulgaria) Julia Stamatova (Italy) Federica Arcidiacono (Italy) Melania Delai
October 18	Antalya, Turkey; Clay; W15; Singles and Doubles Draws	(Sweden) Vanessa Ersöz (Sweden) Kajsa Rinaldo Persson; 4–6, 6–1, [10–4]	(Netherlands) Jasmijn Gimbrère (Italy) Irene Lavino	(Italy) Deborah Chiesa (Hungary) Dorka Drahota-Szabó	(Spain) Rosa Vicens Mas (Bulgaria) Julia Stamatova (Italy) Federica Arcidiacono (Italy) Melania Delai
October 25	Internationaux Féminins de la Vienne; Poitiers, France; Hard (indoor); W80; Singles Draw – Doubles Draw	(France) Chloé Paquet; 6–4, 6–3	(Switzerland) Simona Waltert	(France) Elsa Jacquemot (France) Harmony Tan	(France) Océane Dodin (Liechtenstein) Kathinka von Deichmann (Georgia (country)) Mariam Bolkvadze (Cyprus) Raluca Șerban
October 25	Internationaux Féminins de la Vienne; Poitiers, France; Hard (indoor); W80; Singles Draw – Doubles Draw	(Georgia (country)) Mariam Bolkvadze (United Kingdom) Samantha Murray Sharan; 7–6^{(7–5)}, 6–0	(France) Audrey Albié (France) Léolia Jeanjean	(France) Elsa Jacquemot (France) Harmony Tan	(France) Océane Dodin (Liechtenstein) Kathinka von Deichmann (Georgia (country)) Mariam Bolkvadze (Cyprus) Raluca Șerban
October 25	Torneig Internacional Els Gorchs; Les Franqueses del Vallès, Spain; Hard; W80+H; Singles Draw – Doubles Draw	(Belgium) Maryna Zanevska; 7–6^{(7–5)}, 6–4	(Switzerland) Ylena In-Albon	(Australia) Arina Rodionova (Serbia) Nina Stojanović	(Serbia) Natalija Stevanović (Czech Republic) Linda Fruhvirtová (Spain) Andrea Lázaro García (Hungary) Dalma Gálfi
October 25	Torneig Internacional Els Gorchs; Les Franqueses del Vallès, Spain; Hard; W80+H; Singles Draw – Doubles Draw	(Russia) Irina Khromacheva (Australia) Arina Rodionova; 2–6, 6–3, [10–6]	(Switzerland) Susan Bandecchi (United Kingdom) Eden Silva	(Australia) Arina Rodionova (Serbia) Nina Stojanović	(Serbia) Natalija Stevanović (Czech Republic) Linda Fruhvirtová (Spain) Andrea Lázaro García (Hungary) Dalma Gálfi
October 25	Tyler Pro Challenge; Tyler, United States; Hard; W80; Singles Draw – Doubles Draw	(Japan) Misaki Doi; 7–6^{(7–5)}, 6–2	(United Kingdom) Harriet Dart	(Mexico) Marcela Zacarías (Brazil) Beatriz Haddad Maia	(United States) Madison Brengle (Poland) Katarzyna Kawa (United States) Caty McNally (United States) Claire Liu
October 25	Tyler Pro Challenge; Tyler, United States; Hard; W80; Singles Draw – Doubles Draw	(Mexico) Giuliana Olmos (Mexico) Marcela Zacarías; 7–5, 1–6, [10–5]	(Japan) Misaki Doi (Poland) Katarzyna Kawa	(Mexico) Marcela Zacarías (Brazil) Beatriz Haddad Maia	(United States) Madison Brengle (Poland) Katarzyna Kawa (United States) Caty McNally (United States) Claire Liu
October 25	Guayaquil, Ecuador; Clay; W25; Singles and Doubles Draws	(Brazil) Laura Pigossi; 6–0, 6–2	(Germany) Katharina Gerlach	(Brazil) Carolina Alves (Ecuador) Mell Reasco	(Mexico) Victoria Rodríguez (Colombia) María Herazo González (Bosnia and Herzegovina) Dea Herdželaš (Hungary) Vanda Lukács
October 25	Guayaquil, Ecuador; Clay; W25; Singles and Doubles Draws	(Colombia) María Herazo González (Colombia) María Paulina Pérez; 6–3, 4–6, [10–7]	(Bosnia and Herzegovina) Dea Herdželaš (Mexico) Victoria Rodríguez	(Brazil) Carolina Alves (Ecuador) Mell Reasco	(Mexico) Victoria Rodríguez (Colombia) María Herazo González (Bosnia and Herzegovina) Dea Herdželaš (Hungary) Vanda Lukács
October 25	Kiryat Motzkin, Israel; Hard; W25; Singles and Doubles Draws	(Israel) Lina Glushko; 6–3, 6–4	(Switzerland) Joanne Züger	(Russia) Maria Bondarenko (Russia) Erika Andreeva	(United Kingdom) Freya Christie (Lithuania) Akvilė Paražinskaitė (Slovenia) Nika Radišić (Israel) Shavit Kimchi
October 25	Kiryat Motzkin, Israel; Hard; W25; Singles and Doubles Draws	(Netherlands) Quirine Lemoine (Netherlands) Eva Vedder; 6–0, 6–2	(Russia) Maria Bondarenko (France) Carole Monnet	(Russia) Maria Bondarenko (Russia) Erika Andreeva	(United Kingdom) Freya Christie (Lithuania) Akvilė Paražinskaitė (Slovenia) Nika Radišić (Israel) Shavit Kimchi
October 25	Karaganda, Kazakhstan; Hard (indoor); W25; Singles and Doubles Draws	(Uzbekistan) Nigina Abduraimova; 6–7^{(3–7)}, 6–3, 6–1	(Slovakia) Viktória Morvayová	(Belarus) Shalimar Talbi (Russia) Ekaterina Kazionova	(Ukraine) Marianna Zakarlyuk (Russia) Polina Kudermetova (Poland) Martyna Kubka (Estonia) Elena Malõgina
October 25	Karaganda, Kazakhstan; Hard (indoor); W25; Singles and Doubles Draws	(Serbia) Tamara Čurović (Russia) Ekaterina Reyngold; 2–6, 6–3, [10–7]	(Russia) Ekaterina Kazionova (Russia) Ekaterina Makarova	(Belarus) Shalimar Talbi (Russia) Ekaterina Kazionova	(Ukraine) Marianna Zakarlyuk (Russia) Polina Kudermetova (Poland) Martyna Kubka (Estonia) Elena Malõgina
October 25	Istanbul, Turkey; Hard (indoor); W25; Singles and Doubles Draws	(Germany) Eva Lys; 6–3, 7–6^{(7–4)}	(Netherlands) Indy de Vroome	(Turkey) Çağla Büyükakçay (Turkey) Pemra Özgen	(Russia) Julia Avdeeva (Turkey) Zeynep Sönmez (Romania) Ilona Georgiana Ghioroaie (Italy) Anna Turati
October 25	Istanbul, Turkey; Hard (indoor); W25; Singles and Doubles Draws	(Netherlands) Jasmijn Gimbrère (Netherlands) Bibiane Schoofs; 6–2, 6–4	(Poland) Maja Chwalińska (Czech Republic) Miriam Kolodziejová	(Turkey) Çağla Büyükakçay (Turkey) Pemra Özgen	(Russia) Julia Avdeeva (Turkey) Zeynep Sönmez (Romania) Ilona Georgiana Ghioroaie (Italy) Anna Turati
October 25	Austin, United States; Hard; W25; Singles and Doubles Draws	(Sweden) Mirjam Björklund; 2–6, 6–2, 6–2	(United States) Kayla Day	(Mexico) Fernanda Contreras (United States) Kylie Collins	(United States) Chanelle Van Nguyen (Australia) Ivana Popovic (Switzerland) Lulu Sun (Georgia (country)) Sofia Shapatava
October 25	Austin, United States; Hard; W25; Singles and Doubles Draws	(United States) Elysia Bolton (United States) Maegan Manasse; 6–1, 7–5	(United States) Rasheeda McAdoo (United States) Chanelle Van Nguyen	(Mexico) Fernanda Contreras (United States) Kylie Collins	(United States) Chanelle Van Nguyen (Australia) Ivana Popovic (Switzerland) Lulu Sun (Georgia (country)) Sofia Shapatava
October 25	Sharm El Sheikh, Egypt; Hard; W15; Singles and Doubles Draws	(China) Bai Zhuoxuan; 4–6, 6–0, 6–4	(Hong Kong) Eudice Chong	(Japan) Eri Shimizu (Hong Kong) Wu Ho-ching	(Germany) Silvia Ambrosio (Hong Kong) Cody Wong (China) Li Zongyu (Egypt) Lamis Alhussein Abdel Aziz
October 25	Sharm El Sheikh, Egypt; Hard; W15; Singles and Doubles Draws	(China) Bai Zhuoxuan (Thailand) Punnin Kovapitukted; 4–6, 6–2, [10–7]	(Hong Kong) Eudice Chong (Hong Kong) Cody Wong	(Japan) Eri Shimizu (Hong Kong) Wu Ho-ching	(Germany) Silvia Ambrosio (Hong Kong) Cody Wong (China) Li Zongyu (Egypt) Lamis Alhussein Abdel Aziz
October 25	Monastir, Tunisia; Hard; W15; Singles and Doubles Draws	(Germany) Kathleen Kanev; 6–2, 7–6^{(7–1)}	(Hong Kong) Adithya Karunaratne	(China) Ma Yexin (Germany) Mia Mack	(Croatia) Lucija Ćirić Bagarić (Italy) Alessandra Simone (China) Ni Ma Zhuoma (Italy) Giulia Crescenzi
October 25	Monastir, Tunisia; Hard; W15; Singles and Doubles Draws	(Japan) Mana Ayukawa (Hungary) Rebeka Stolmár; 6–3, 6–4	(China) Ma Yexin (China) Ni Ma Zhuoma	(China) Ma Yexin (Germany) Mia Mack	(Croatia) Lucija Ćirić Bagarić (Italy) Alessandra Simone (China) Ni Ma Zhuoma (Italy) Giulia Crescenzi
October 25	Antalya, Turkey; Clay; W15; Singles and Doubles Draws	(Argentina) Julia Riera; 6–4, 5–7, 7–6^{(7–1)}	(Spain) Rosa Vicens Mas	(Italy) Melania Delai (Italy) Federica Arcidiacono	(Bulgaria) Julia Stamatova (Italy) Martina Spigarelli (United States) Sofia Sewing (France) Julie Belgraver
October 25	Antalya, Turkey; Clay; W15; Singles and Doubles Draws	(South Korea) Back Da-yeon (China) Tian Fangran; 7–6^{(7–5)}, 6–1	(Turkey) Doğa Türkmen (Turkey) Melis Ayda Uyar	(Italy) Melania Delai (Italy) Federica Arcidiacono	(Bulgaria) Julia Stamatova (Italy) Martina Spigarelli (United States) Sofia Sewing (France) Julie Belgraver

=== November ===
Week of	Tournament	Winner	Runners-up	Semifinalists	Quarterfinalists
November 1	Open Nantes Atlantique; Nantes, France; Hard (indoor); W60; Singles Draw – Doubles Draw	(Ukraine) Anhelina Kalinina; 7–6^{(7–4)}, 1–0, ret.	(France) Océane Dodin	(Italy) Martina Trevisan (Russia) Vitalia Diatchenko	(United Kingdom) Sarah Beth Grey (France) Alice Robbe (Netherlands) Lesley Pattinama Kerkhove (Russia) Varvara Gracheva
November 1	Open Nantes Atlantique; Nantes, France; Hard (indoor); W60; Singles Draw – Doubles Draw	(United Kingdom) Samantha Murray Sharan (France) Jessika Ponchet; 6–4, 6–2	(United Kingdom) Alicia Barnett (United Kingdom) Olivia Nicholls	(Italy) Martina Trevisan (Russia) Vitalia Diatchenko	(United Kingdom) Sarah Beth Grey (France) Alice Robbe (Netherlands) Lesley Pattinama Kerkhove (Russia) Varvara Gracheva
November 1	Haabneeme, Estonia; Hard (indoor); W25; Singles and Doubles Draws	(United Kingdom) Katie Swan; 7–6^{(7–3)}, 6–3	(Russia) Ekaterina Shalimova	(United Kingdom) Katie Boulter (Ukraine) Daria Lopatetska	(China) Yuan Yue (Poland) Weronika Falkowska (Finland) Laura Hietaranta (Turkey) Ayla Aksu
November 1	Haabneeme, Estonia; Hard (indoor); W25; Singles and Doubles Draws	(United States) Jessica Failla (Japan) Chihiro Muramatsu; 6–3, 6–4	(Poland) Maja Chwalińska (Hungary) Adrienn Nagy	(United Kingdom) Katie Boulter (Ukraine) Daria Lopatetska	(China) Yuan Yue (Poland) Weronika Falkowska (Finland) Laura Hietaranta (Turkey) Ayla Aksu
November 1	Orlando, United States; Clay; W25; Singles and Doubles Draws	(United States) Emma Navarro; 3–6, 6–2, 6–3	(United States) Allie Kiick	(Russia) Amina Anshba (South Korea) Jang Su-jeong	(Bosnia and Herzegovina) Nefisa Berberović (Mexico) María José Portillo Ramírez (Japan) Moyuka Uchijima (Switzerland) Lulu Sun
November 1	Orlando, United States; Clay; W25; Singles and Doubles Draws	(United States) Anna Rogers (United States) Christina Rosca; 6–3, 6–1	(France) Marine Partaud (Mexico) María José Portillo Ramírez	(Russia) Amina Anshba (South Korea) Jang Su-jeong	(Bosnia and Herzegovina) Nefisa Berberović (Mexico) María José Portillo Ramírez (Japan) Moyuka Uchijima (Switzerland) Lulu Sun
November 1	Sharm El Sheikh, Egypt; Hard; W15; Singles and Doubles Draws	(China) Li Zongyu; 6–4, 6–2	(Romania) Elena-Teodora Cadar	(China) Wang Jiaqi (Hong Kong) Eudice Chong	(Slovakia) Barbora Matúšová (United Kingdom) Anna Brogan (Egypt) Lamis Alhussein Abdel Aziz (Hong Kong) Wu Ho-ching
November 1	Sharm El Sheikh, Egypt; Hard; W15; Singles and Doubles Draws	(Hong Kong) Eudice Chong (Hong Kong) Cody Wong; 4–6, 6–1, [10–4]	(China) Bai Zhuoxuan (Thailand) Punnin Kovapitukted	(China) Wang Jiaqi (Hong Kong) Eudice Chong	(Slovakia) Barbora Matúšová (United Kingdom) Anna Brogan (Egypt) Lamis Alhussein Abdel Aziz (Hong Kong) Wu Ho-ching
November 1	Heraklion, Greece; Clay; W15; Singles and Doubles Draws	(Germany) Anna Gabric; 6–1, 6–1	(Italy) Giorgia Pinto	(Germany) Fabienne Gettwart (Greece) Martha Matoula	(Croatia) Adriana Rajković (Romania) Arina Vasilescu (Greece) Eleni Christofi (Slovakia) Sofia Milatová
November 1	Heraklion, Greece; Clay; W15; Singles and Doubles Draws	(Germany) Anna Gabric (Romania) Arina Vasilescu; 6–2, 6–1	(Slovakia) Laura Svatíková (Serbia) Draginja Vuković	(Germany) Fabienne Gettwart (Greece) Martha Matoula	(Croatia) Adriana Rajković (Romania) Arina Vasilescu (Greece) Eleni Christofi (Slovakia) Sofia Milatová
November 1	Solarino, Italy; Carpet; W15; Singles and Doubles Draws	(Australia) Alicia Smith; 6–3, 7–6^{(8–6)}	(Italy) Federica Bilardo	(Italy) Giulia Crescenzi (Switzerland) Bojana Klincov	(Italy) Federica Urgesi (Italy) Giulia Tedesco (Poland) Aleksandra Jeleń (Italy) Melania Delai
November 1	Solarino, Italy; Carpet; W15; Singles and Doubles Draws	(Czech Republic) Petra Csabi (Czech Republic) Karolína Vlčková; 7–6^{(7–5)}, 6–1	(Italy) Federica Arcidiacono (Italy) Giulia Crescenzi	(Italy) Giulia Crescenzi (Switzerland) Bojana Klincov	(Italy) Federica Urgesi (Italy) Giulia Tedesco (Poland) Aleksandra Jeleń (Italy) Melania Delai
November 1	Castellón, Spain; Clay; W15; Singles and Doubles Draws	(Spain) Celia Cerviño Ruiz; 5–7, 6–1, 7–6^{(7–2)}	(Argentina) Lucía Peyre	(Malta) Helene Pellicano (Serbia) Mihaela Đaković	(Italy) Martina Spigarelli (South Korea) Ku Yeon-woo (Germany) Emily Seibold (Greece) Sapfo Sakellaridi
November 1	Castellón, Spain; Clay; W15; Singles and Doubles Draws	(Portugal) Inês Murta (Greece) Sapfo Sakellaridi; 6–4, 6–4	(Spain) Alba Carrillo Marín (Germany) Emily Seibold	(Malta) Helene Pellicano (Serbia) Mihaela Đaković	(Italy) Martina Spigarelli (South Korea) Ku Yeon-woo (Germany) Emily Seibold (Greece) Sapfo Sakellaridi
November 1	Monastir, Tunisia; Hard; W15; Singles and Doubles Draws	(China) Ma Yexin; 6–4, 6–2	(Germany) Julia Middendorf	(Thailand) Luksika Kumkhum (Hungary) Rebeka Stolmár	(Croatia) Mariana Dražić (France) Yasmine Mansouri (Germany) Mia Mack (Serbia) Elena Milovanović
November 1	Monastir, Tunisia; Hard; W15; Singles and Doubles Draws	(France) Yasmine Mansouri (Serbia) Elena Milovanović; 7–6^{(7–4)}, 6–0	(Croatia) Mariana Dražić (Germany) Julia Middendorf	(Thailand) Luksika Kumkhum (Hungary) Rebeka Stolmár	(Croatia) Mariana Dražić (France) Yasmine Mansouri (Germany) Mia Mack (Serbia) Elena Milovanović
November 1	Antalya, Turkey; Clay; W15; Singles and Doubles Draws	(Argentina) Julia Riera; 7–6^{(7–3)}, 6–1	(China) Tian Fangran	(Italy) Diletta Cherubini (Romania) Lavinia Tănăsie	(Slovenia) Noka Jurič (United States) Rachel Gailis (Japan) Himari Sato (Turkey) Özlem Uslu
November 1	Antalya, Turkey; Clay; W15; Singles and Doubles Draws	(Russia) Ksenia Laskutova (Russia) Aleksandra Pospelova; 2–6, 6–2, [10–6]	(South Korea) Back Da-yeon (China) Tian Fangran	(Italy) Diletta Cherubini (Romania) Lavinia Tănăsie	(Slovenia) Noka Jurič (United States) Rachel Gailis (Japan) Himari Sato (Turkey) Özlem Uslu
November 8	Copa LP Chile; Santiago, Chile; Clay; W60+H; Singles Draw – Doubles Draw	(Hungary) Anna Bondár; 6–2, 6–3	(Paraguay) Verónica Cepede Royg	(France) Diane Parry (Netherlands) Arianne Hartono	(Brazil) Beatriz Haddad Maia (Georgia (country)) Ekaterine Gorgodze (Romania) Irina Bara (Colombia) Emiliana Arango
November 8	Copa LP Chile; Santiago, Chile; Clay; W60+H; Singles Draw – Doubles Draw	(Netherlands) Arianne Hartono (Australia) Olivia Tjandramulia; 6–1, 6–3	(Germany) Katharina Gerlach (Chile) Daniela Seguel	(France) Diane Parry (Netherlands) Arianne Hartono	(Brazil) Beatriz Haddad Maia (Georgia (country)) Ekaterine Gorgodze (Romania) Irina Bara (Colombia) Emiliana Arango
November 8	Aparecida de Goiânia, Brazil; Clay; W25; Singles and Doubles Draws	(Andorra) Victoria Jiménez Kasintseva; 6–3, 7–5	(Hungary) Panna Udvardy	(Brazil) Laura Pigossi (Mexico) Ana Sofía Sánchez	(Czech Republic) Anna Sisková (Brazil) Carolina Alves (Canada) Carol Zhao (Brazil) Ingrid Gamarra Martins
November 8	Aparecida de Goiânia, Brazil; Clay; W25; Singles and Doubles Draws	(Brazil) Laura Pigossi (Czech Republic) Anna Sisková; 6–2, 7–6^{(7–5)}	(Netherlands) Merel Hoedt (Germany) Luisa Meyer auf der Heide	(Brazil) Laura Pigossi (Mexico) Ana Sofía Sánchez	(Czech Republic) Anna Sisková (Brazil) Carolina Alves (Canada) Carol Zhao (Brazil) Ingrid Gamarra Martins
November 8	Daytona Beach, United States; Clay; W25; Singles and Doubles Draws	(Romania) Irina Fetecău; 6–1, 6–2	(United States) Alycia Parks	(Mexico) María José Portillo Ramírez (South Korea) Jang Su-jeong	(Japan) Moyuka Uchijima (South Korea) Han Na-lae (United States) Hanna Chang (Belgium) Marie Benoît
November 8	Daytona Beach, United States; Clay; W25; Singles and Doubles Draws	(United States) Elysia Bolton (United States) Kylie Collins; 6–4, 6–7^{(4–7)}, [10–5]	(Australia) Alexandra Osborne (United States) Alycia Parks	(Mexico) María José Portillo Ramírez (South Korea) Jang Su-jeong	(Japan) Moyuka Uchijima (South Korea) Han Na-lae (United States) Hanna Chang (Belgium) Marie Benoît
November 8	Sharm El Sheikh, Egypt; Hard; W15; Singles and Doubles Draws	(China) Bai Zhuoxuan; 6–1, 6–3	(Romania) Elena-Teodora Cadar	(Thailand) Punnin Kovapitukted (Hong Kong) Wu Ho-ching	(Slovakia) Barbora Matúšová (Hong Kong) Cody Wong (China) Li Zongyu (Hong Kong) Eudice Chong
November 8	Sharm El Sheikh, Egypt; Hard; W15; Singles and Doubles Draws	(Indonesia) Priska Madelyn Nugroho (Netherlands) Stéphanie Visscher; 6–4, 7–6^{(7–0)}	(South Korea) Lee So-ra (Russia) Anna Ureke	(Thailand) Punnin Kovapitukted (Hong Kong) Wu Ho-ching	(Slovakia) Barbora Matúšová (Hong Kong) Cody Wong (China) Li Zongyu (Hong Kong) Eudice Chong
November 8	Heraklion, Greece; Clay; W15; Singles and Doubles Draws	(Greece) Martha Matoula; 6–0, 7–5	(Germany) Julia Kimmelmann	(Germany) Fabienne Gettwart (Italy) Sofia Rocchetti	(Italy) Giorgia Pinto (Romania) Simona Ogescu (Greece) Eleni Christofi (Slovakia) Laura Svatíková
November 8	Heraklion, Greece; Clay; W15; Singles and Doubles Draws	(Greece) Eleni Christofi (Greece) Martha Matoula; 6–3, 6–2	(Romania) Ilinca Amariei (Romania) Simona Ogescu	(Germany) Fabienne Gettwart (Italy) Sofia Rocchetti	(Italy) Giorgia Pinto (Romania) Simona Ogescu (Greece) Eleni Christofi (Slovakia) Laura Svatíková
November 8	Solarino, Italy; Carpet; W15; Singles and Doubles Draws	(Slovakia) Katarína Kužmová; 6–1, 6–1	(Czech Republic) Petra Csabi	(Switzerland) Bojana Klincov (Italy) Federica Urgesi	(Sweden) Jacqueline Cabaj Awad (Italy) Eleonora Alvisi (Italy) Federica Bilardo (Italy) Giulia Carbonaro
November 8	Solarino, Italy; Carpet; W15; Singles and Doubles Draws	(Italy) Virginia Ferrara (Italy) Giorgia Pedone; 6–1, 1–6, [10–5]	(Sweden) Jacqueline Cabaj Awad (Australia) Alicia Smith	(Switzerland) Bojana Klincov (Italy) Federica Urgesi	(Sweden) Jacqueline Cabaj Awad (Italy) Eleonora Alvisi (Italy) Federica Bilardo (Italy) Giulia Carbonaro
November 8	Helsingborg, Sweden; Hard (indoor); W15; Singles and Doubles Draws	(Denmark) Olga Helmi; 6–4, 1–6, 6–4	(Sweden) Caijsa Hennemann	(Sweden) Fanny Östlund (United States) Jessica Failla	(Denmark) Sofia Samavati (Germany) Anna Klasen (Czech Republic) Aneta Kladivová (United States) Taylor Ng
November 8	Helsingborg, Sweden; Hard (indoor); W15; Singles and Doubles Draws	(Germany) Anna Klasen (Germany) Phillippa Preugschat; 1–6, 6–3, [11–9]	(Russia) Tatiana Barkova (Hungary) Natália Szabanin	(Sweden) Fanny Östlund (United States) Jessica Failla	(Denmark) Sofia Samavati (Germany) Anna Klasen (Czech Republic) Aneta Kladivová (United States) Taylor Ng
November 8	Monastir, Tunisia; Hard; W15; Singles and Doubles Draws	(Hong Kong) Adithya Karunaratne; 6–4, 6–2	(Japan) Lisa-Marie Rioux	(Netherlands) Noa Liauw A Fong (France) Yasmine Mansouri	(Belgium) Tilwith Di Girolami (Japan) Ayumi Morita (Switzerland) Nadine Keller (Serbia) Elena Milovanović
November 8	Monastir, Tunisia; Hard; W15; Singles and Doubles Draws	(China) Ni Ma Zhuoma (China) Yao Xinxin; 6–1, 4–6, [10–2]	(Thailand) Luksika Kumkhum (Serbia) Nikol Paleček	(Netherlands) Noa Liauw A Fong (France) Yasmine Mansouri	(Belgium) Tilwith Di Girolami (Japan) Ayumi Morita (Switzerland) Nadine Keller (Serbia) Elena Milovanović
November 8	Antalya, Turkey; Clay; W15; Singles and Doubles Draws	(Russia) Diana Shnaider; 6–3, 6–2	(Slovenia) Pia Lovrič	(Germany) Natalia Siedliska (Turkey) İlay Yörük	(Turkey) Doğa Türkmen (Slovakia) Vanda Vargová (Russia) Anna Chekanskaya (Russia) Eva Garkusha
November 8	Antalya, Turkey; Clay; W15; Singles and Doubles Draws	(South Korea) Back Da-yeon (China) Tian Fangran; 7–5, 6–3	(Russia) Anna Chekanskaya (Georgia (country)) Zoziya Kardava	(Germany) Natalia Siedliska (Turkey) İlay Yörük	(Turkey) Doğa Türkmen (Slovakia) Vanda Vargová (Russia) Anna Chekanskaya (Russia) Eva Garkusha
November 15	Pétange, Luxembourg; Hard (indoor); W25; Singles and Doubles Draws	(France) Océane Dodin; 6–3, 6–1	(Belarus) Anna Kubareva	(Hungary) Tímea Babos (China) Yuan Yue	(Luxembourg) Mandy Minella (Burundi) Sada Nahimana (Finland) Anastasia Kulikova (France) Margaux Rouvroy
November 15	Pétange, Luxembourg; Hard (indoor); W25; Singles and Doubles Draws	(Switzerland) Xenia Knoll (Switzerland) Joanne Züger; 6–3, 6–3	(France) Julie Belgraver (France) Lucie Nguyen Tan	(Hungary) Tímea Babos (China) Yuan Yue	(Luxembourg) Mandy Minella (Burundi) Sada Nahimana (Finland) Anastasia Kulikova (France) Margaux Rouvroy
November 15	Funchal, Portugal; Hard; W25; Singles and Doubles Draws	(China) Zheng Qinwen; 6–3, 7–5	(Italy) Martina Trevisan	(Slovakia) Kristína Kučová (France) Chloé Paquet	(Croatia) Antonia Ružić (United Kingdom) Jodie Burrage (South Korea) Ku Yeon-woo (Italy) Deborah Chiesa
November 15	Funchal, Portugal; Hard; W25; Singles and Doubles Draws	(United Kingdom) Alicia Barnett (Chinese Taipei) Hsieh Yu-chieh; 6–1, 3–6, [10–8]	(Portugal) Inês Murta (Latvia) Daniela Vismane	(Slovakia) Kristína Kučová (France) Chloé Paquet	(Croatia) Antonia Ružić (United Kingdom) Jodie Burrage (South Korea) Ku Yeon-woo (Italy) Deborah Chiesa
November 15	Naples, United States; Clay; W25; Singles and Doubles Draws	(Bosnia and Herzegovina) Nefisa Berberović; 7–5, 2–6, 7–5	(South Korea) Jang Su-jeong	(United States) Alexa Graham (Switzerland) Lulu Sun	(Indonesia) Aldila Sutjiadi (Belgium) Marie Benoît (United States) Elvina Kalieva (United States) Kennedy Shaffer
November 15	Naples, United States; Clay; W25; Singles and Doubles Draws	(United States) Hanna Chang (United States) Elizabeth Mandlik; 4–6, 6–1, [10–7]	(Chinese Taipei) Hsu Chieh-yu (Indonesia) Jessy Rompies	(United States) Alexa Graham (Switzerland) Lulu Sun	(Indonesia) Aldila Sutjiadi (Belgium) Marie Benoît (United States) Elvina Kalieva (United States) Kennedy Shaffer
November 15	Cundinamarca, Colombia; Clay (indoor); W15; Singles and Doubles Draws	(Colombia) María Herazo González; 7–6^{(7–5)}, 3–6, 7–6^{(7–4)}	(United States) Hurricane Tyra Black	(Chile) Fernanda Brito (Colombia) Yuliana Monroy	(Colombia) Antonia Samudio (Colombia) María Paulina Pérez (United States) Rushri Wijesundera (Germany) Emily Welker
November 15	Cundinamarca, Colombia; Clay (indoor); W15; Singles and Doubles Draws	(United States) Hurricane Tyra Black (United States) Rushri Wijesundera; 7–6^{(13–11)}, 5–7, [10–4]	(Chile) Fernanda Astete (Colombia) Jessica Plazas	(Chile) Fernanda Brito (Colombia) Yuliana Monroy	(Colombia) Antonia Samudio (Colombia) María Paulina Pérez (United States) Rushri Wijesundera (Germany) Emily Welker
November 15	Sharm El Sheikh, Egypt; Hard; W15; Singles and Doubles Draws	(China) Bai Zhuoxuan; 3–6, 7–6^{(7–5)}, 6–0	(Romania) Elena-Teodora Cadar	(Ukraine) Ganna Poznikhirenko (Hong Kong) Cody Wong	(Hungary) Adrienn Nagy (Russia) Anastasia Zolotareva (Hong Kong) Wu Ho-ching (China) Li Zongyu
November 15	Sharm El Sheikh, Egypt; Hard; W15; Singles and Doubles Draws	(Romania) Elena-Teodora Cadar (Hong Kong) Cody Wong; 6–2, 6–3	(China) Bai Zhuoxuan (Thailand) Punnin Kovapitukted	(Ukraine) Ganna Poznikhirenko (Hong Kong) Cody Wong	(Hungary) Adrienn Nagy (Russia) Anastasia Zolotareva (Hong Kong) Wu Ho-ching (China) Li Zongyu
November 15	Heraklion, Greece; Clay; W15; Singles and Doubles Draws	(Romania) Oana Gavrilă; 3–6, 6–3, 6–4	(Russia) Anna Ukolova	(Greece) Eleni Christofi (Greece) Dimitra Pavlou	(Romania) Ilinca Amariei (Ukraine) Mariia Bergen (Spain) Alba Rey García (Greece) Michaela Laki
November 15	Heraklion, Greece; Clay; W15; Singles and Doubles Draws	(Greece) Eleni Christofi (Greece) Dimitra Pavlou; 6–3, 7–6^{(10–8)}	(Italy) Giorgia Pinto (Japan) Risa Ushijima	(Greece) Eleni Christofi (Greece) Dimitra Pavlou	(Romania) Ilinca Amariei (Ukraine) Mariia Bergen (Spain) Alba Rey García (Greece) Michaela Laki
November 15	Solarino, Italy; Carpet; W15; Singles and Doubles Draws	(Italy) Melania Delai; 7–6^{(7–3)}, 6–3	(Sweden) Jacqueline Cabaj Awad	(Italy) Federica Bilardo (Italy) Federica Urgesi	(Slovakia) Katarína Kužmová (Switzerland) Bojana Klincov (Italy) Linda Salvi (Germany) Nicole Rivkin
November 15	Solarino, Italy; Carpet; W15; Singles and Doubles Draws	(Italy) Federica Urgesi (Italy) Denise Valente; 7–5, 6–7^{(4–7)}, [10–5]	(Italy) Melania Delai (Australia) Alicia Smith	(Italy) Federica Bilardo (Italy) Federica Urgesi	(Slovakia) Katarína Kužmová (Switzerland) Bojana Klincov (Italy) Linda Salvi (Germany) Nicole Rivkin
November 15	Monastir, Tunisia; Hard; W15; Singles and Doubles Draws	(Hungary) Rebeka Stolmár; 6–4, 5–7, 6–4	(France) Océane Babel	(Japan) Ayumi Morita (Japan) Lisa-Marie Rioux	(Germany) Anja Wildgruber (Switzerland) Nicole Gadient (France) Evita Ramirez (Switzerland) Kristina Milenkovic
November 15	Monastir, Tunisia; Hard; W15; Singles and Doubles Draws	(Bulgaria) Gergana Topalova (Belgium) Eliessa Vanlangendonck; 6–1, 6–2	(Netherlands) Anouk Koevermans (Netherlands) Lexie Stevens	(Japan) Ayumi Morita (Japan) Lisa-Marie Rioux	(Germany) Anja Wildgruber (Switzerland) Nicole Gadient (France) Evita Ramirez (Switzerland) Kristina Milenkovic
November 15	Antalya, Turkey; Clay; W15; Singles and Doubles Draws	(Argentina) Jazmín Ortenzi; 6–0, 7–5	(Russia) Diana Demidova	(Russia) Diana Shnaider (Serbia) Tamara Čurović	(Ukraine) Anastasiya Soboleva (Slovenia) Pia Lovrič (Russia) Yana Karpovich (Turkey) İlay Yörük
November 15	Antalya, Turkey; Clay; W15; Singles and Doubles Draws	(Russia) Diana Shnaider (Ukraine) Anastasiya Soboleva; 6–2, 6–0	(Serbia) Tamara Čurović (Hungary) Amarissa Kiara Tóth	(Russia) Diana Shnaider (Serbia) Tamara Čurović	(Ukraine) Anastasiya Soboleva (Slovenia) Pia Lovrič (Russia) Yana Karpovich (Turkey) İlay Yörük
November 22	Al Habtoor Tennis Challenge; Dubai, United Arab Emirates; Hard; W100+H; Singles Draw – Doubles Draw	(Ukraine) Daria Snigur; 6–3, 6–0	(Slovakia) Kristína Kučová	(Russia) Anastasia Gasanova (Serbia) Aleksandra Krunić	(China) Zheng Qinwen (Slovakia) Viktória Kužmová (Russia) Vitalia Diatchenko (Bulgaria) Isabella Shinikova
November 22	Al Habtoor Tennis Challenge; Dubai, United Arab Emirates; Hard; W100+H; Singles Draw – Doubles Draw	(Kazakhstan) Anna Danilina (Slovakia) Viktória Kužmová; 4–6, 6–3, [10–2]	(Russia) Angelina Gabueva (Russia) Anastasia Zakharova	(Russia) Anastasia Gasanova (Serbia) Aleksandra Krunić	(China) Zheng Qinwen (Slovakia) Viktória Kužmová (Russia) Vitalia Diatchenko (Bulgaria) Isabella Shinikova
November 22	Aberto da República; Brasília, Brazil; Clay (indoor); W60; Singles Draw – Doubles Draw	(Hungary) Panna Udvardy; 0–6, 6–4, 6–3	(Russia) Elina Avanesyan	(Romania) Gabriela Lee (Paraguay) Verónica Cepede Royg	(China) You Xiaodi (Canada) Carol Zhao (Estonia) Maria Lota Kaul (Brazil) Carolina Alves
November 22	Aberto da República; Brasília, Brazil; Clay (indoor); W60; Singles Draw – Doubles Draw	(Brazil) Carolina Alves (Argentina) María Lourdes Carlé; 6–2, 6–1	(Ukraine) Valeriya Strakhova (Australia) Olivia Tjandramulia	(Romania) Gabriela Lee (Paraguay) Verónica Cepede Royg	(China) You Xiaodi (Canada) Carol Zhao (Estonia) Maria Lota Kaul (Brazil) Carolina Alves
November 22	Milovice, Czech Republic; Hard (indoor); W25; Singles and Doubles Draws	(Czech Republic) Linda Nosková; 6–3, 6–4	(Czech Republic) Nikola Bartůňková	(Czech Republic) Jesika Malečková (Bosnia and Herzegovina) Dea Herdželaš	(Czech Republic) Johana Marková (Russia) Darya Astakhova (Japan) Misaki Matsuda (Czech Republic) Barbora Palicová
November 22	Milovice, Czech Republic; Hard (indoor); W25; Singles and Doubles Draws	(Japan) Sakura Hosogi (Japan) Misaki Matsuda; 3–6, 6–2, [10–8]	(Poland) Maja Chwalińska (Czech Republic) Linda Nosková	(Czech Republic) Jesika Malečková (Bosnia and Herzegovina) Dea Herdželaš	(Czech Republic) Johana Marková (Russia) Darya Astakhova (Japan) Misaki Matsuda (Czech Republic) Barbora Palicová
November 22	Ortisei, Italy; Hard (indoor); W25; Singles and Doubles Draws	(Switzerland) Susan Bandecchi; 6–4, 6–4	(India) Karman Thandi	(Germany) Stephanie Wagner (Serbia) Natalija Stevanović	(Italy) Stefania Rubini (Russia) Erika Andreeva (Hungary) Tímea Babos (Liechtenstein) Kathinka von Deichmann
November 22	Ortisei, Italy; Hard (indoor); W25; Singles and Doubles Draws	(Hong Kong) Eudice Chong (Japan) Moyuka Uchijima; 6–2, 1–6, [10–5]	(Switzerland) Susan Bandecchi (Switzerland) Ylena In-Albon	(Germany) Stephanie Wagner (Serbia) Natalija Stevanović	(Italy) Stefania Rubini (Russia) Erika Andreeva (Hungary) Tímea Babos (Liechtenstein) Kathinka von Deichmann
November 22	Cairo, Egypt; Clay; W15; Singles and Doubles Draws	(Canada) Carson Branstine; 7–6^{(8–6)}, 6–1	(Indonesia) Priska Madelyn Nugroho	(Belarus) Aliona Falei (China) Li Zongyu	(Spain) Rosa Vicens Mas (Italy) Francesca Pace (United States) Anastasia Nefedova (China) Wang Jiaqi
November 22	Cairo, Egypt; Clay; W15; Singles and Doubles Draws	(China) Bai Zhuoxuan (Thailand) Punnin Kovapitukted; 6–3, 7–6^{(7–1)}	(Kazakhstan) Yekaterina Dmitrichenko (Germany) Antonia Schmidt	(Belarus) Aliona Falei (China) Li Zongyu	(Spain) Rosa Vicens Mas (Italy) Francesca Pace (United States) Anastasia Nefedova (China) Wang Jiaqi
November 22	Heraklion, Greece; Clay; W15; Singles and Doubles Draws	(Greece) Michaela Laki; 5–7, 6–1, 7–5	(Israel) Nicole Khirin	(Italy) Martina Spigarelli (Italy) Nicole Fossa Huergo	(Romania) Bianca Elena Bărbulescu (Slovakia) Radka Zelníčková (Romania) Simona Ogescu (Bulgaria) Ani Vangelova
November 22	Heraklion, Greece; Clay; W15; Singles and Doubles Draws	(Israel) Nicole Khirin (Slovakia) Radka Zelníčková; 6–2, 6–4	(Germany) Julia Kimmelmann (Netherlands) Lian Tran	(Italy) Martina Spigarelli (Italy) Nicole Fossa Huergo	(Romania) Bianca Elena Bărbulescu (Slovakia) Radka Zelníčková (Romania) Simona Ogescu (Bulgaria) Ani Vangelova
November 22	Guatemala City, Guatemala; Hard; W15; Singles and Doubles Draws	(United States) Hurricane Tyra Black; 7–5, 6–3	(United States) Olivia Lincer	(Guatemala) Gabriela Rivera (Colombia) Jessica Plazas	(United States) Paris Corley (Guatemala) Kirsten-Andrea Weedon (Guatemala) Melissa Morales (United States) Tara Malik
November 22	Guatemala City, Guatemala; Hard; W15; Singles and Doubles Draws	(United States) Paris Corley (United States) Lexington Reed; 4–6, 7–6^{(7–1)}, [10–5]	(Chile) Fernanda Astete (United States) Hurricane Tyra Black	(Guatemala) Gabriela Rivera (Colombia) Jessica Plazas	(United States) Paris Corley (Guatemala) Kirsten-Andrea Weedon (Guatemala) Melissa Morales (United States) Tara Malik
November 22	Cancún, Mexico; Hard; W15; Singles and Doubles Draws	(United States) Raveena Kingsley; 6–1, 7–6^{(7–1)}	(France) Tiphanie Fiquet	(Mexico) Marcela Zacarías (United States) Caroline Lampl	(Canada) Stacey Fung (Argentina) Berta Bonardi (Chinese Taipei) Hsu Chieh-yu (Colombia) Yuliana Monroy
November 22	Cancún, Mexico; Hard; W15; Singles and Doubles Draws	(Japan) Minami Akiyama (Japan) Miho Kuramochi; 7–6^{(8–6)}, 2–6, [10–8]	(United Kingdom) Amelia Bissett (France) Anaëlle Leclercq	(Mexico) Marcela Zacarías (United States) Caroline Lampl	(Canada) Stacey Fung (Argentina) Berta Bonardi (Chinese Taipei) Hsu Chieh-yu (Colombia) Yuliana Monroy
November 22	Lousada, Portugal; Hard (indoor); W15; Singles and Doubles Draws	(South Korea) Ku Yeon-woo; 6–0, 7–5	(Slovenia) Živa Falkner	(Hungary) Natália Szabanin (Japan) Ayumi Koshiishi	(Turkey) Ayla Aksu (Italy) Angelica Moratelli (Japan) Himeno Sakatsume (France) Amandine Monnot
November 22	Lousada, Portugal; Hard (indoor); W15; Singles and Doubles Draws	(Netherlands) Jasmijn Gimbrère (Switzerland) Naïma Karamoko; Walkover	(Portugal) Inês Murta (India) Vasanti Shinde	(Hungary) Natália Szabanin (Japan) Ayumi Koshiishi	(Turkey) Ayla Aksu (Italy) Angelica Moratelli (Japan) Himeno Sakatsume (France) Amandine Monnot
November 22	Kazan Open; Kazan, Russia; Hard (indoor); W15; Singles and Doubles Draws	(Russia) Polina Kudermetova; 7–5, 3–6, 6–4	(Uzbekistan) Nigina Abduraimova	(Russia) Ekaterina Maklakova (Russia) Daria Kudashova	(Belarus) Jana Kolodynska (Russia) Polina Iatcenko (Russia) Alina Khvatova (Ukraine) Anastasiya Poplavska
November 22	Kazan Open; Kazan, Russia; Hard (indoor); W15; Singles and Doubles Draws	(Uzbekistan) Nigina Abduraimova (Russia) Ekaterina Reyngold; 6–2, 6–7^{(8–10)}, [12–10]	(Russia) Ekaterina Maklakova (Russia) Aleksandra Pospelova	(Russia) Ekaterina Maklakova (Russia) Daria Kudashova	(Belarus) Jana Kolodynska (Russia) Polina Iatcenko (Russia) Alina Khvatova (Ukraine) Anastasiya Poplavska
November 22	Monastir, Tunisia; Hard; W15; Singles and Doubles Draws	(United Kingdom) Sonay Kartal; 6–1, 6–2	(Japan) Ayumi Morita	(France) Nina Radovanovic (Netherlands) Demi Tran	(France) Evita Ramirez (Belgium) Eliessa Vanlangendonck (Hong Kong) Wu Ho-ching (Lithuania) Akvilė Paražinskaitė
November 22	Monastir, Tunisia; Hard; W15; Singles and Doubles Draws	(Japan) Natsuho Arakawa (Japan) Lisa-Marie Rioux; 2–6, 6–1, [10–6]	(South Korea) Cherry Kim (Hong Kong) Maggie Ng	(France) Nina Radovanovic (Netherlands) Demi Tran	(France) Evita Ramirez (Belgium) Eliessa Vanlangendonck (Hong Kong) Wu Ho-ching (Lithuania) Akvilė Paražinskaitė
November 22	Antalya, Turkey; Clay; W15; Singles and Doubles Draws	(Argentina) Jazmín Ortenzi; 6–0, 6–0	(Russia) Daria Lodikova	(Hungary) Amarissa Kiara Tóth (Turkey) İlay Yörük	(Hungary) Vanda Lukács (Hungary) Dorka Drahota-Szabó (Serbia) Tamara Čurović (Ukraine) Anastasiya Soboleva
November 22	Antalya, Turkey; Clay; W15; Singles and Doubles Draws	(Spain) Claudia Hoste Ferrer (Argentina) Jazmín Ortenzi; 6–2, 6–4	(Slovakia) Romana Čisovská (Russia) Daria Lodikova	(Hungary) Amarissa Kiara Tóth (Turkey) İlay Yörük	(Hungary) Vanda Lukács (Hungary) Dorka Drahota-Szabó (Serbia) Tamara Čurović (Ukraine) Anastasiya Soboleva
November 29	Jablonec nad Nisou, Czech Republic; Carpet (indoor); W25; Singles and Doubles Draws	(United Kingdom) Sarah Beth Grey; 6–2, 6–2	(Finland) Anastasia Kulikova	(Slovakia) Viktória Kužmová (France) Carole Monnet	(Russia) Irina Khromacheva (Netherlands) Indy de Vroome (Russia) Ekaterina Makarova (Latvia) Daniela Vismane
November 29	Jablonec nad Nisou, Czech Republic; Carpet (indoor); W25; Singles and Doubles Draws	(Poland) Maja Chwalińska (Canada) Katherine Sebov; 7–5, 6–4	(Czech Republic) Lucie Havlíčková (Czech Republic) Linda Klimovičová	(Slovakia) Viktória Kužmová (France) Carole Monnet	(Russia) Irina Khromacheva (Netherlands) Indy de Vroome (Russia) Ekaterina Makarova (Latvia) Daniela Vismane
November 29	Selva Gardena, Italy; Hard (indoor); W25; Singles and Doubles Draws	(China) Yuan Yue; 6–2, 7–6^{(7–4)}	(Russia) Erika Andreeva	(France) Elsa Jacquemot (Germany) Stephanie Wagner	(Switzerland) Ylena In-Albon (Serbia) Natalija Stevanović (Australia) Seone Mendez (Switzerland) Susan Bandecchi
November 29	Selva Gardena, Italy; Hard (indoor); W25; Singles and Doubles Draws	(Hong Kong) Eudice Chong (Japan) Moyuka Uchijima; 6–2, 6–1	(United Kingdom) Alicia Barnett (United Kingdom) Olivia Nicholls	(France) Elsa Jacquemot (Germany) Stephanie Wagner	(Switzerland) Ylena In-Albon (Serbia) Natalija Stevanović (Australia) Seone Mendez (Switzerland) Susan Bandecchi
November 29	Curitiba, Brazil; Clay; W15; Singles and Doubles Draws	(Brazil) Gabriela Cé; 3–0, ret.	(Brazil) Thaísa Grana Pedretti	(Argentina) Martina Capurro Taborda (Brazil) Nathaly Kurata	(Germany) Emily Welker (Brazil) Ingrid Gamarra Martins (Bolivia) Noelia Zeballos (Paraguay) Lara Escauriza
November 29	Curitiba, Brazil; Clay; W15; Singles and Doubles Draws	(Paraguay) Lara Escauriza (Bolivia) Noelia Zeballos; 6–3, 6–1	(Brazil) Nathaly Kurata (Brazil) Eduarda Piai	(Argentina) Martina Capurro Taborda (Brazil) Nathaly Kurata	(Germany) Emily Welker (Brazil) Ingrid Gamarra Martins (Bolivia) Noelia Zeballos (Paraguay) Lara Escauriza
November 29	Santo Domingo, Dominican Republic; Hard; W15; Singles and Doubles Draws	(United States) Chanelle Van Nguyen; 6–1, 6–1	(United States) Dasha Ivanova	(United States) Rushri Wijesundera (Russia) Anastasiya Antal	(Colombia) Antonia Samudio (Colombia) María Paulina Pérez (United States) Tara Malik (Venezuela) Nadia Echeverría Alam
November 29	Santo Domingo, Dominican Republic; Hard; W15; Singles and Doubles Draws	(United States) Dasha Ivanova (United States) Chanelle Van Nguyen; 6–4, 6–3	(Colombia) María Herazo González (Colombia) María Paulina Pérez	(United States) Rushri Wijesundera (Russia) Anastasiya Antal	(Colombia) Antonia Samudio (Colombia) María Paulina Pérez (United States) Tara Malik (Venezuela) Nadia Echeverría Alam
November 29	Cairo, Egypt; Clay; W15; Singles and Doubles Draws	(Spain) Rosa Vicens Mas; 6–4, 6–4	(United States) Anastasia Nefedova	(Egypt) Sandra Samir (Kazakhstan) Yekaterina Dmitrichenko	(Canada) Carson Branstine (Russia) Anastasia Zolotareva (Austria) Melanie Klaffner (Egypt) Lamis Alhussein Abdel Aziz
November 29	Cairo, Egypt; Clay; W15; Singles and Doubles Draws	(Belarus) Aliona Falei (Russia) Anastasia Zolotareva; 6–4, 6–2	(Kazakhstan) Yekaterina Dmitrichenko (Egypt) Sandra Samir	(Egypt) Sandra Samir (Kazakhstan) Yekaterina Dmitrichenko	(Canada) Carson Branstine (Russia) Anastasia Zolotareva (Austria) Melanie Klaffner (Egypt) Lamis Alhussein Abdel Aziz
November 29	Heraklion, Greece; Clay; W15; Singles and Doubles Draws	(Israel) Nicole Khirin; 6–2, 6–1	(Slovakia) Radka Zelníčková	(Romania) Ilinca Amariei (Italy) Nicole Fossa Huergo	(Russia) Valeriya Yushchenko (Greece) Michaela Laki (United Kingdom) Lauryn John-Baptiste (Japan) Risa Ushijima
November 29	Heraklion, Greece; Clay; W15; Singles and Doubles Draws	(Italy) Nicole Fossa Huergo (United Kingdom) Lauryn John-Baptiste; 7–5, 6–4	(Russia) Valeriia Olianovskaia (Russia) Nina Olyanovskaya	(Romania) Ilinca Amariei (Italy) Nicole Fossa Huergo	(Russia) Valeriya Yushchenko (Greece) Michaela Laki (United Kingdom) Lauryn John-Baptiste (Japan) Risa Ushijima
November 29	Bengaluru, India; Hard; W15; Singles and Doubles Draws	(India) Pranjala Yadlapalli; 7–5, 6–2	(India) Sowjanya Bavisetti	(India) Rutuja Bhosale (India) Shrivalli Bhamidipaty	(India) Prathyusha Rachapudi (South Korea) Lee So-ra (India) Vaidehi Chaudhari (India) Akanksha Dileep Nitture
November 29	Bengaluru, India; Hard; W15; Singles and Doubles Draws	(India) Sowjanya Bavisetti (India) Rutuja Bhosale; 6–0, 6–3	(India) Vaidehi Chaudhari (India) Mihika Yadav	(India) Rutuja Bhosale (India) Shrivalli Bhamidipaty	(India) Prathyusha Rachapudi (South Korea) Lee So-ra (India) Vaidehi Chaudhari (India) Akanksha Dileep Nitture
November 29	Cancún, Mexico; Hard; W15; Singles and Doubles Draws	(United States) Pamela Montez; 3–6, 6–4, [10–8]	(United States) Caroline Lampl	(Canada) Stacey Fung (United States) Hina Inoue	(Chinese Taipei) Hsu Chieh-yu (Argentina) Melany Solange Krywoj (Bulgaria) Lia Karatancheva (Slovakia) Alica Rusová
November 29	Cancún, Mexico; Hard; W15; Singles and Doubles Draws	(Spain) Alicia Herrero Liñana (Argentina) Melany Solange Krywoj; 6–4, 6–2	(Japan) Minami Akiyama (Japan) Miho Kuramochi	(Canada) Stacey Fung (United States) Hina Inoue	(Chinese Taipei) Hsu Chieh-yu (Argentina) Melany Solange Krywoj (Bulgaria) Lia Karatancheva (Slovakia) Alica Rusová
November 29	Lousada, Portugal; Hard (indoor); W15; Singles and Doubles Draws	(Italy) Angelica Moratelli; 6–3, 1–6, 7–6^{(13–11)}	(Spain) Celia Cerviño Ruiz	(Hungary) Natália Szabanin (Slovenia) Živa Falkner	(Turkey) Ayla Aksu (South Korea) Ku Yeon-woo (Poland) Weronika Baszak (Russia) Tatiana Barkova
November 29	Lousada, Portugal; Hard (indoor); W15; Singles and Doubles Draws	(Spain) Celia Cerviño Ruiz (Portugal) Matilde Jorge; 6–1, 6–4	(Netherlands) Jasmijn Gimbrère (Australia) Alicia Smith	(Hungary) Natália Szabanin (Slovenia) Živa Falkner	(Turkey) Ayla Aksu (South Korea) Ku Yeon-woo (Poland) Weronika Baszak (Russia) Tatiana Barkova
November 29	Monastir, Tunisia; Hard; W15; Singles and Doubles Draws	(Romania) Ilona Georgiana Ghioroaie; 6–7^{(5–7)}, 6–3, 6–4	(Hong Kong) Adithya Karunaratne	(France) Nina Radovanovic (China) Ma Yexin	(Hong Kong) Maggie Ng (Slovakia) Bianca Behúlová (France) Jenifer Anger (Japan) Ayumi Morita
November 29	Monastir, Tunisia; Hard; W15; Singles and Doubles Draws	(Japan) Rina Saigo (Japan) Yukina Saigo; 6–0, 4–6, [10–5]	(France) Yasmine Mansouri (Italy) Alessandra Simone	(France) Nina Radovanovic (China) Ma Yexin	(Hong Kong) Maggie Ng (Slovakia) Bianca Behúlová (France) Jenifer Anger (Japan) Ayumi Morita
November 29	Antalya, Turkey; Clay; W15; Singles and Doubles Draws	(Romania) Arina Vasilescu; 6–0, 6–2	(Russia) Ksenia Laskutova	(Spain) Carlota Martínez Círez (Hungary) Amarissa Kiara Tóth	(Spain) Claudia Hoste Ferrer (Turkey) İlay Yörük (Italy) Diletta Cherubini (Russia) Polina Kudermetova
November 29	Antalya, Turkey; Clay; W15; Singles and Doubles Draws	(Russia) Ksenia Laskutova (Hungary) Amarissa Kiara Tóth; 6–0, 7–5	(Spain) Claudia Hoste Ferrer (Spain) Carlota Martínez Círez	(Spain) Carlota Martínez Círez (Hungary) Amarissa Kiara Tóth	(Spain) Claudia Hoste Ferrer (Turkey) İlay Yörük (Italy) Diletta Cherubini (Russia) Polina Kudermetova

=== December ===
Week of	Tournament	Winner	Runners-up	Semifinalists	Quarterfinalists
December 6	Santo Domingo, Dominican Republic; Hard; W15; Singles and Doubles Draws	(Colombia) María Herazo González; 6–4, 6–4	(United States) Chanelle Van Nguyen	(Russia) Anastasiya Antal (United States) Olivia Lincer	(Chile) Fernanda Astete (Venezuela) Nadia Echeverría Alam (United States) Sylvia Schenck (Slovakia) Ingrid Vojčináková
December 6	Santo Domingo, Dominican Republic; Hard; W15; Singles and Doubles Draws	(Colombia) María Herazo González (Colombia) María Paulina Pérez; 7–6^{(7–4)}, 3–6, [12–10]	(United States) Paris Corley (Slovakia) Ingrid Vojčináková	(Russia) Anastasiya Antal (United States) Olivia Lincer	(Chile) Fernanda Astete (Venezuela) Nadia Echeverría Alam (United States) Sylvia Schenck (Slovakia) Ingrid Vojčináková
December 6	Cairo, Egypt; Clay; W15; Singles and Doubles Draws	(Russia) Anastasia Zolotareva; 6–4, 6–2	(United States) Anastasia Nefedova	(Italy) Gaia Squarcialupi (Chinese Taipei) Yang Ya-yi	(Germany) Antonia Schmidt (Italy) Giorgia Pinto (Egypt) Lamis Alhussein Abdel Aziz (Spain) Rosa Vicens Mas
December 6	Cairo, Egypt; Clay; W15; Singles and Doubles Draws	(Austria) Melanie Klaffner (Russia) Anastasia Zolotareva; 2–6, 6–3, [10–2]	(Ukraine) Viktoriya Petrenko (Russia) Anna Ureke	(Italy) Gaia Squarcialupi (Chinese Taipei) Yang Ya-yi	(Germany) Antonia Schmidt (Italy) Giorgia Pinto (Egypt) Lamis Alhussein Abdel Aziz (Spain) Rosa Vicens Mas
December 6	Solapur, India; Hard; W15; Singles and Doubles Draws	(India) Rutuja Bhosale; 4–6, 7–5, 6–1	(India) Vaidehi Chaudhari	(India) Sowjanya Bavisetti (India) Zeel Desai	(Denmark) Elena Jamshidi (India) Sathwika Sama (India) Pranjala Yadlapalli (India) Akanksha Dileep Nitture
December 6	Solapur, India; Hard; W15; Singles and Doubles Draws	(India) Ramya Natarajan (India) Sathwika Sama; 6–3, 1–6, [13–11]	(India) Sharmada Balu (India) Sowjanya Bavisetti	(India) Sowjanya Bavisetti (India) Zeel Desai	(Denmark) Elena Jamshidi (India) Sathwika Sama (India) Pranjala Yadlapalli (India) Akanksha Dileep Nitture
December 6	Cancún, Mexico; Hard; W15; Singles and Doubles Draws	(United States) Hina Inoue; 6–2, 6–2	(United States) Madison Sieg	(United States) Pamela Montez (Argentina) Berta Bonardi	(Mexico) Victoria Rodríguez (Canada) Stacey Fung (Mexico) Jessica Hinojosa Gómez (Chinese Taipei) Hsu Chieh-yu
December 6	Cancún, Mexico; Hard; W15; Singles and Doubles Draws	(Canada) Stacey Fung (United States) Pamela Montez; 6–4, 6–2	(Mexico) Jessica Hinojosa Gómez (Mexico) Victoria Rodríguez	(United States) Pamela Montez (Argentina) Berta Bonardi	(Mexico) Victoria Rodríguez (Canada) Stacey Fung (Mexico) Jessica Hinojosa Gómez (Chinese Taipei) Hsu Chieh-yu
December 6	Monastir, Tunisia; Hard; W15; Singles and Doubles Draws	(Italy) Angelica Raggi; 4–6, 6–3, 6–4	(France) Nina Radovanovic	(Thailand) Anchisa Chanta (China) Ma Yexin	(Japan) Rina Saigo (Czech Republic) Petra Csabi (Belgium) Eliessa Vanlangendonck (Lithuania) Akvilė Paražinskaitė
December 6	Monastir, Tunisia; Hard; W15; Singles and Doubles Draws	(Lithuania) Akvilė Paražinskaitė (Belgium) Eliessa Vanlangendonck; 6–3, 6–3	(Serbia) Mihaela Đaković (Italy) Angelica Raggi	(Thailand) Anchisa Chanta (China) Ma Yexin	(Japan) Rina Saigo (Czech Republic) Petra Csabi (Belgium) Eliessa Vanlangendonck (Lithuania) Akvilė Paražinskaitė
December 6	Antalya, Turkey; Clay; W15; Singles and Doubles Draws	(Argentina) Jazmín Ortenzi; 6–2, 7–6^{(9–7)}	(Romania) Arina Vasilescu	(Russia) Diana Demidova (Spain) Carlota Martínez Círez	(Italy) Diletta Cherubini (Italy) Federica Arcidiacono (Bulgaria) Julia Stamatova (Italy) Martina Spigarelli
December 6	Antalya, Turkey; Clay; W15; Singles and Doubles Draws	(Russia) Ksenia Laskutova (Hungary) Amarissa Kiara Tóth; 6–4, 6–2	(Croatia) Mariana Dražić (Argentina) Jazmín Ortenzi	(Russia) Diana Demidova (Spain) Carlota Martínez Círez	(Italy) Diletta Cherubini (Italy) Federica Arcidiacono (Bulgaria) Julia Stamatova (Italy) Martina Spigarelli
December 13	Giza, Egypt; Hard; W15; Singles and Doubles Draws	(Egypt) Lamis Alhussein Abdel Aziz; 6–4, 7–5	(Russia) Tatiana Barkova	(Egypt) Yasmin Ezzat (Serbia) Bojana Marinković	(Netherlands) Jasmijn Gimbrère (Australia) Alicia Smith (Greece) Sapfo Sakellaridi (Russia) Anastasia Zolotareva
December 13	Giza, Egypt; Hard; W15; Singles and Doubles Draws	(Greece) Sapfo Sakellaridi (China) You Mi Zhuoma; 7–6^{(7–4)}, 6–3	(Kazakhstan) Gozal Ainitdinova (Russia) Anastasia Sukhotina	(Egypt) Yasmin Ezzat (Serbia) Bojana Marinković	(Netherlands) Jasmijn Gimbrère (Australia) Alicia Smith (Greece) Sapfo Sakellaridi (Russia) Anastasia Zolotareva
December 13	Cancún, Mexico; Hard; W15; Singles and Doubles Draws	(Canada) Stacey Fung; 6–2, 6–3	(Colombia) Yuliana Monroy	(United States) Stephanie Kent (Guatemala) Gabriela Rivera	(Mexico) Jessica Hinojosa Gómez (Canada) Ariana Arseneault (Japan) Minami Akiyama (Bulgaria) Eleonore Tchakarova
December 13	Cancún, Mexico; Hard; W15; Singles and Doubles Draws	(Canada) Ariana Arseneault (Canada) Stacey Fung; 1–6, 7–6^{(7–2)}, [10–7]	(Bulgaria) Eleonore Tchakarova (Bulgaria) Verginie Tchakarova	(United States) Stephanie Kent (Guatemala) Gabriela Rivera	(Mexico) Jessica Hinojosa Gómez (Canada) Ariana Arseneault (Japan) Minami Akiyama (Bulgaria) Eleonore Tchakarova
December 13	Lambaré, Paraguay; Clay; W15; Singles and Doubles Draws	(Paraguay) Lara Escauriza; 6–3, 6–1	(Canada) Cadence Brace	(Brazil) Sofia da Cruz Mendonça (Argentina) Luciana Blatter	(Argentina) Lucía Peyre (Chile) Daniela López (Argentina) Martina Belén Roldán Santander (Brazil) Paola Ueno Dalmonico
December 13	Lambaré, Paraguay; Clay; W15; Singles and Doubles Draws	(Brazil) Júlia Klimovicz (Brazil) Juliana Munhoz; 6–4, 6–2	(Argentina) Martina Belén Roldán Santander (Argentina) Tiziana Rossini	(Brazil) Sofia da Cruz Mendonça (Argentina) Luciana Blatter	(Argentina) Lucía Peyre (Chile) Daniela López (Argentina) Martina Belén Roldán Santander (Brazil) Paola Ueno Dalmonico
December 13	Monastir, Tunisia; Hard; W15; Singles and Doubles Draws	(Japan) Erika Sema; 3–6, 6–4, 6–3	(Belgium) Eliessa Vanlangendonck	(Belgium) Hanne Vandewinkel (Italy) Angelica Raggi	(Lithuania) Akvilė Paražinskaitė (Spain) Celia Cerviño Ruiz (United Kingdom) Eliz Maloney (United Kingdom) Anna Brogan
December 13	Monastir, Tunisia; Hard; W15; Singles and Doubles Draws	(Spain) Celia Cerviño Ruiz (Hong Kong) Maggie Ng; 6–2, 6–4	(Switzerland) Jenny Dürst (Hong Kong) Cody Wong	(Belgium) Hanne Vandewinkel (Italy) Angelica Raggi	(Lithuania) Akvilė Paražinskaitė (Spain) Celia Cerviño Ruiz (United Kingdom) Eliz Maloney (United Kingdom) Anna Brogan
December 13	Antalya, Turkey; Clay; W15; Singles and Doubles Draws	(Ukraine) Ganna Poznikhirenko; 7–5, 6–1	(Russia) Daria Lodikova	(Russia) Diana Demidova (Hungary) Amarissa Kiara Tóth	(Italy) Diletta Cherubini (Turkey) Özlem Uslu (Bulgaria) Mihaela Tsoneva (Romania) Oana Gavrilă
December 13	Antalya, Turkey; Clay; W15; Singles and Doubles Draws	(Romania) Oana Gavrilă (Romania) Arina Vasilescu; 1–6, 6–4, [12–10]	(Russia) Ksenia Laskutova (Hungary) Amarissa Kiara Tóth	(Russia) Diana Demidova (Hungary) Amarissa Kiara Tóth	(Italy) Diletta Cherubini (Turkey) Özlem Uslu (Bulgaria) Mihaela Tsoneva (Romania) Oana Gavrilă
December 20	NECC–ITF Women's Tennis Championships; Pune, India; Hard; W25; Singles and Doubles Draws	(Japan) Moyuka Uchijima; 6–2, 7–5	(Latvia) Diāna Marcinkēviča	(Russia) Ekaterina Reyngold (Uzbekistan) Nigina Abduraimova	(Bosnia and Herzegovina) Nefisa Berberović (Ukraine) Valeriya Strakhova (Japan) Chihiro Muramatsu (Kazakhstan) Anna Danilina
December 20	NECC–ITF Women's Tennis Championships; Pune, India; Hard; W25; Singles and Doubles Draws	(Kazakhstan) Anna Danilina (Ukraine) Valeriya Strakhova; 6–0, 2–6, [10–5]	(Japan) Funa Kozaki (Japan) Misaki Matsuda	(Russia) Ekaterina Reyngold (Uzbekistan) Nigina Abduraimova	(Bosnia and Herzegovina) Nefisa Berberović (Ukraine) Valeriya Strakhova (Japan) Chihiro Muramatsu (Kazakhstan) Anna Danilina
December 20	Giza, Egypt; Hard; W15; Singles and Doubles Draws	(France) Séléna Janicijevic; 6–3, 2–6, 6–2	(Greece) Sapfo Sakellaridi	(Russia) Maria Sholokhova (Netherlands) Jasmijn Gimbrère	(Japan) Lisa-Marie Rioux (Slovakia) Barbora Matúšová (Russia) Polina Pavlova (Russia) Elena Pridankina
December 20	Giza, Egypt; Hard; W15; Singles and Doubles Draws	(Oman) Fatma Al-Nabhani (Netherlands) Jasmijn Gimbrére; 2–6, 6–3, [10–5]	(Greece) Sapfo Sakellaridi (Russia) Maria Sholokhova	(Russia) Maria Sholokhova (Netherlands) Jasmijn Gimbrère	(Japan) Lisa-Marie Rioux (Slovakia) Barbora Matúšová (Russia) Polina Pavlova (Russia) Elena Pridankina
December 20	Monastir, Tunisia; Hard; W15; Singles and Doubles Draws	(Hong Kong) Eudice Chong; 3–6, 6–4, 7–6^{(7–5)}	(Belgium) Sofia Costoulas	(Russia) Ksenia Laskutova (United Kingdom) Eliz Maloney	(Switzerland) Arlinda Rushiti (France) Chloé Noël (Russia) Yaroslava Bartashevich (United States) Chiara Scholl
December 20	Monastir, Tunisia; Hard; W15; Singles and Doubles Draws	(Russia) Ksenia Laskutova (Hong Kong) Maggie Ng; 7–5, 6–3	(Lithuania) Andrė Lukošiūtė (United Kingdom) Eliz Maloney	(Russia) Ksenia Laskutova (United Kingdom) Eliz Maloney	(Switzerland) Arlinda Rushiti (France) Chloé Noël (Russia) Yaroslava Bartashevich (United States) Chiara Scholl
December 27	Navi Mumbai, India; Hard; W25; Singles and Doubles Draws	(Russia) Ekaterina Reyngold; 6–3, 6–2	(Latvia) Diāna Marcinkēviča	(Japan) Naho Sato (Bosnia and Herzegovina) Nefisa Berberović	(India) Zeel Desai (Japan) Moyuka Uchijima (Japan) Akiko Omae (Russia) Ekaterina Yashina
December 27	Navi Mumbai, India; Hard; W25; Singles and Doubles Draws	(Kazakhstan) Zhibek Kulambayeva (Latvia) Diāna Marcinkēviča; 6–3, 4–6, [10–6]	(Kazakhstan) Anna Danilina (Ukraine) Valeriya Strakhova	(Japan) Naho Sato (Bosnia and Herzegovina) Nefisa Berberović	(India) Zeel Desai (Japan) Moyuka Uchijima (Japan) Akiko Omae (Russia) Ekaterina Yashina
December 27	Giza, Egypt; Hard; W15; Singles and Doubles Draws	(Netherlands) Jasmijn Gimbrère; 6–0, 6–3	(Greece) Sapfo Sakellaridi	(Japan) Lisa-Marie Rioux (France) Séléna Janicijevic	(Japan) Chihiro Takayama (Egypt) Lamis Alhussein Abdel Aziz (Belgium) Chelsea Vanhoutte (Slovakia) Barbora Matúšová
December 27	Giza, Egypt; Hard; W15; Singles and Doubles Draws	(Greece) Sapfo Sakellaridi (China) You Mi Zhuoma; 7–5, 6–3	(Netherlands) Jasmijn Gimbrère (Japan) Lisa-Marie Rioux	(Japan) Lisa-Marie Rioux (France) Séléna Janicijevic	(Japan) Chihiro Takayama (Egypt) Lamis Alhussein Abdel Aziz (Belgium) Chelsea Vanhoutte (Slovakia) Barbora Matúšová
December 27	Monastir, Tunisia; Hard; W15; Singles and Doubles Draws	(Lithuania) Akvilė Paražinskaitė; 7–5, 6–2	(Belgium) Sofia Costoulas	(Russia) Ksenia Laskutova (Japan) Haruna Arakawa	(France) Carole Monnet (Switzerland) Arlinda Rushiti (Germany) Pia Praefke (Hong Kong) Cody Wong
December 27	Monastir, Tunisia; Hard; W15; Singles and Doubles Draws	(Russia) Yaroslava Bartashevich (Russia) Ksenia Laskutova; 6–2, 6–1	(Japan) Haruna Arakawa (France) Victoria Muntean	(Russia) Ksenia Laskutova (Japan) Haruna Arakawa	(France) Carole Monnet (Switzerland) Arlinda Rushiti (Germany) Pia Praefke (Hong Kong) Cody Wong
