= 2022 Copa LP Chile =

Women's Tennis tournament

- Date: 7–13 November 2022
- Edition: 5th
- Category: WTA 125
- Prize money: $115,000
- Surface: Clay / Outdoor
- Location: Colina, Chile
- Venue: Hacienda Chicureo

Champions

Singles
- (Egypt) Mayar Sherif

Doubles
- Yana Sizikova / (Indonesia) Aldila Sutjiadi
← 2021 ·	Copa LP Chile	· 2023 →

The 2022 Copa LP Chile, also known as the 2022 LP Open by IND, for sponsorship reasons, was a professional women's tennis tournament played on outdoor clay courts. It was the fifth edition of the tournament and the first ever as a WTA 125, which was also part of the 2022 WTA 125 tournaments. It took place at the Hacienda Chicureo Club in Colina, Chile between 7 and 13 November 2022.

== Champions ==
=== Singles ===
- (Egypt) Mayar Sherif def. (Ukraine) Kateryna Baindl 3–6, 7–6^{(7–3)}, 7–5

=== Doubles ===
- Yana Sizikova / (Indonesia) Aldila Sutjiadi def. (Egypt) Mayar Sherif / (Slovenia) Tamara Zidanšek 6–1, 3–6, [10–7]

== Singles main-draw entrants ==
=== Seeds ===
Country	Player	Rank^{1}	Seed
EGY	Mayar Sherif	51	1
MNE	Danka Kovinić	79	2
AUT	Julia Grabher	84	3
SLO	Tamara Zidanšek	87	4
ITA	Sara Errani	104	5
KOR	Jang Su-jeong	116	6
AND	Victoria Jiménez Kasintseva	124	7
USA	Emma Navarro	136	8

- ^{1} Rankings are as of 31 October 2022.

=== Other entrants ===
The following players received wildcards into the singles main draw:

- (Chile) Fernanda Astete
- (Hungary) Tímea Babos
- (Chile) Fernanda Labraña
- (Chile) Daniela Seguel
- (Egypt) Mayar Sherif

The following players received entry from the qualifying draw:

- (Spain) Yvonne Cavallé Reimers
- (United States) Bethanie Mattek-Sands
- (Germany) Lena Papadakis
- Diana Shnaider

=== Withdrawals ===
Before the tournament

- (Hungary) Réka Luca Jani → replaced by (United States) Caroline Dolehide
- Anna Kalinskaya → replaced by (Japan) Yuki Naito
- (United States) Elizabeth Mandlik → replaced by Darya Astakhova
- (France) Kristina Mladenovic → replaced by (Turkey) İpek Öz
- (Colombia) Camila Osorio → replaced by (Spain) Rosa Vicens Mas
- (France) Chloé Paquet → replaced by (France) Carole Monnet
- (United States) Katrina Scott → replaced by (Czech Republic) Sára Bejlek

== Doubles entrants ==
=== Seeds ===
Country	Player	Country	Player	Rank^{1}	Seed
	Yana Sizikova	INA	Aldila Sutjiadi	104	1
EGY	Mayar Sherif	SLO	Tamara Zidanšek	158	2
HUN	Tímea Babos	GEO	Ekaterine Gorgodze	174	3
VEN	Andrea Gámiz	NED	Eva Vedder	211	4

- ^{1} Rankings as of 31 October 2022.

=== Other entrants ===
The following pair received a wildcard into the doubles main draw:

- (Chile) Fernanda Labraña / (Chile) Daniela Seguel
