= 2022 Copa LP Chile – Singles =

Singles
- 2022 Copa LP Chile

Final
- Champion: (Egypt) Mayar Sherif
- Runner-up: (Ukraine) Kateryna Baindl
- Score: 3–6, 7–6^{(7–3)}, 7–5

Events
Singles	Doubles
← 2021 ·	Copa LP Chile	· 2023 →

Anna Bondár was the reigning champion, but chose not to participate.

Mayar Sherif defeated Kateryna Baindl in the final, 3–6, 7–6^{(7–3)}, 7–5. This was Sherif's fourth WTA Challenger singles title.

== Seeds ==
1. (Egypt) Mayar Sherif (champion)
2. (Montenegro) Danka Kovinić (semifinals)
3. (Austria) Julia Grabher (quarterfinals)
4. (Slovenia) Tamara Zidanšek (second round)
5. (Italy) Sara Errani (first round)
6. (South Korea) Jang Su-jeong (first round)
7. (Andorra) Victoria Jiménez Kasintseva (quarterfinals)
8. (United States) Emma Navarro (quarterfinals)

== Draw ==
=== Key ===
- Q = Qualifier
- WC = Wild card
- LL = Lucky loser
- Alt = Alternate
- SE = Special exempt
- PR = Protected ranking
- ITF = ITF entry
- JE = Junior exempt
- w/o = Walkover
- r = Retired
- d = Defaulted
- SR = Special ranking

=== Finals ===
Semifinals
1/WC	(Egypt) Mayar Sherif	7^{8}	4	7^{7}
(United States) Caroline Dolehide	6^{6}	6	6^{3}
(Ukraine) Kateryna Baindl	7^{7}	6
2	(Montenegro) Danka Kovinić	6^{3}	1

Final
1/WC	(Egypt) Mayar Sherif	3	7^{7}	7
(Ukraine) Kateryna Baindl	6	6^{3}	5

=== Top half ===
First round
1/WC	(Egypt) M Sherif	6	6
WC	(Chile) F Astete	0	0
(Netherlands) E Vedder	2	4
(Czech Republic) B Fruhvirtová	6	6
Q	(Spain) Y Cavallé Reimers	6	3	2
(France) C Burel	3	6	6
Q	(Germany) L Papadakis	3	2
8	(United States) E Navarro	6	6
3	(Austria) J Grabher	6	7
(France) C Monnet	3	5
(Romania) I Bara	6	6
WC	(Hungary) T Babos	1	4
(Colombia) E Arango	6	6
WC	(Chile) D Seguel	0	1
(United States) C Dolehide	6	6
6	(South Korea) S-j Jang	2	2

Second round
1/WC	(Egypt) M Sherif	6	4	7
(Czech Republic) B Fruhvirtová	2	6	5
(France) C Burel	3	3
8	(United States) E Navarro	6	6
3	(Austria) J Grabher	6	6
(Romania) I Bara	4	1
(Colombia) E Arango	4	4
(United States) C Dolehide	6	6

Quarterfinals
1/WC	(Egypt) M Sherif	6	6
8	(United States) E Navarro	0	2
3	(Austria) J Grabher	2	1
(United States) C Dolehide	6	6

Semifinals
1/WC	(Egypt) M Sherif	7^{8}	4	7^{7}
(United States) C Dolehide	6^{6}	6	6^{3}

=== Bottom half ===
First round
7	(Andorra) V Jiménez Kasintseva	7^{7}	1	6
(Turkey) İ Öz	6^{3}	6	2
(Greece) D Papamichail	6	6
D Astakhova	3	3
(Spain) R Vicens Mas	5	4
(Ukraine) K Baindl	7	6
(France) H Tan	2	6	3
4	(Slovenia) T Zidanšek	6	3	6
5	(Italy) S Errani	3	2
(Czech Republic) S Bejlek	6	6
WC	(Chile) F Labraña	5	3
Q	D Shnaider	7	6
(Georgia (country)) E Gorgodze	6	4	1
(Japan) Y Naito	3	6	6
Q	(United States) B Mattek-Sands	0	3
2	(Montenegro) D Kovinić	6	6

Second round
7	(Andorra) V Jiménez Kasintseva	6	6
(Greece) D Papamichail	1	2
(Ukraine) K Baindl	6	4	6
4	(Slovenia) T Zidanšek	4	6	1
(Czech Republic) S Bejlek	3	1
Q	D Shnaider	6	6
(Japan) Y Naito	1	7^{7}	4
2	(Montenegro) D Kovinić	6	6^{4}	6

Quarterfinals
7	(Andorra) V Jiménez Kasintseva	7^{9}	2	3
(Ukraine) K Baindl	6^{7}	6	6
Q	D Shnaider	6^{4}	4
2	(Montenegro) D Kovinić	7^{7}	6

Semifinals
(Ukraine) K Baindl	7^{7}	6
2	(Montenegro) D Kovinić	6^{3}	1

== Qualifying ==
=== Seeds ===
1. Diana Shnaider (qualified)
2. (China) You Xiaodi (qualifying competition)
3. (Germany) Lena Papadakis (qualified)
4. (Spain) Yvonne Cavallé Reimers (qualified)

=== Qualifiers ===
1. Diana Shnaider
2. (United States) Bethanie Mattek-Sands
3. (Germany) Lena Papadakis
4. (Spain) Yvonne Cavallé Reimers

=== Qualifying draw ===
==== First qualifier ====
Qualifying competition
1	Diana Shnaider	6	6
WC	(Colombia) María Herazo González	3	2

==== Second qualifier ====
Qualifying competition
2	(China) You Xiaodi	6^{4}	2
WC	(United States) Bethanie Mattek-Sands	7^{7}	6

==== Third qualifier ====
Qualifying competition
3	(Germany) Lena Papadakis	7^{7}	0	6
	(Brazil) Gabriela Cé	6^{5}	6	3

==== Fourth qualifier ====
Qualifying competition
4	(Spain) Yvonne Cavallé Reimers	6	6
	(United States) Whitney Osuigwe	3	2
