= 2022 Copa LP Chile – Doubles =

Doubles
- 2022 Copa LP Chile

Final
- Champions: Yana Sizikova (Indonesia) Aldila Sutjiadi
- Runners-up: (Egypt) Mayar Sherif (Slovenia) Tamara Zidanšek
- Score: 6–1, 3–6, [10–7]

Events
Singles	Doubles
← 2021 ·	Copa LP Chile	· 2023 →

Arianne Hartono and Olivia Tjandramulia were the defending champions, but chose not to participate.

Top seeds Yana Sizikova and Aldila Sutjiadi won the title, defeating Mayar Sherif and Tamara Zidanšek in the final, 6–1, 3–6, [10–7].

== Seeds ==
1. Yana Sizikova / (Indonesia) Aldila Sutjiadi (champions)
2. (Egypt) Mayar Sherif / (Slovenia) Tamara Zidanšek (final)
3. (Hungary) Tímea Babos / (Georgia (country)) Ekaterine Gorgodze (quarterfinals)
4. (Venezuela) Andrea Gámiz / (Netherlands) Eva Vedder (first round)

== Draw ==
=== Key ===
- Q = Qualifier
- WC = Wild card
- LL = Lucky loser
- Alt = Alternate
- SE = Special exempt
- PR = Protected ranking
- ITF = ITF entry
- JE = Junior exempt
- w/o = Walkover
- r = Retired
- d = Defaulted
- SR = Special ranking

=== Draw ===
First round
1	Y Sizikova (Indonesia) A Sutjiadi	6^{3}	6	[10]
SR	(United States) Q Gleason (France) E Lechemia	7^{7}	3	[2]
(Chile) A Guarachi (Montenegro) D Kovinić	7	2	[10]
(Romania) I Bara (Italy) S Errani	5	6	[8]
4	(Venezuela) A Gámiz (Netherlands) E Vedder	4	4
(United States) J Aney (United States) I Neel	6	6
(Colombia) M Herazo González (Brazil) R Pereira	4	3
A Anshba; D Astakhova	6	6
(South Korea) S-j Jang (United States) W Osuigwe	7	6
WC	(Chile) F Labraña (Chile) D Seguel	5	2
(Greece) D Papamichail (Ukraine) V Strakhova	2	7^{7}	[2]
3	(Hungary) T Babos (Georgia (country)) E Gorgodze	6	6^{3}	[10]
(France) C Monnet (Japan) Y Naito	3	1
(France) C Burel (France) M Partaud	6	6
(Czech Republic) S Bejlek (Turkey) İ Öz	2	4
2	(Egypt) M Sherif (Slovenia) T Zidanšek	6	6

Quarterfinals
1	Y Sizikova (Indonesia) A Sutjiadi	w/o
(Chile) A Guarachi (Montenegro) D Kovinić
(United States) J Aney (United States) I Neel	6	6
A Anshba; D Astakhova	1	4
(South Korea) S-j Jang (United States) W Osuigwe	1	7^{7}	[10]
3	(Hungary) T Babos (Georgia (country)) E Gorgodze	6	6^{3}	[8]
(France) C Burel (France) M Partaud	6^{5}	3
2	(Egypt) M Sherif (Slovenia) T Zidanšek	7^{7}	6

Semifinals
1	Y Sizikova (Indonesia) A Sutjiadi	7	4	[10]
(United States) J Aney (United States) I Neel	5	6	[8]
(South Korea) S-j Jang (United States) W Osuigwe	2	3
2	(Egypt) M Sherif (Slovenia) T Zidanšek	6	6

Final
1	Y Sizikova (Indonesia) A Sutjiadi	6	3	[10]
2	(Egypt) M Sherif (Slovenia) T Zidanšek	1	6	[7]
