= 2021 Copa LP Chile – Doubles =

Doubles
- 2021 Copa LP Chile

Final
- Champions: (Netherlands) Arianne Hartono (Australia) Olivia Tjandramulia
- Runners-up: (Germany) Katharina Gerlach (Chile) Daniela Seguel
- Score: 6–1, 6–3

Events
Singles	Doubles
← 2019 ·	Copa LP Chile	· 2022 →

Hayley Carter and Luisa Stefani were the defending champions but chose not to participate.

Arianne Hartono and Olivia Tjandramulia won the title, defeating Katharina Gerlach and Daniela Seguel in the final, 6–1, 6–3.

== Seeds ==
1. (Romania) Irina Bara / (Georgia (country)) Ekaterine Gorgodze (semifinals)
2. (Indonesia) Beatrice Gumulya / (Indonesia) Jessy Rompies (semifinals)
3. (Netherlands) Arianne Hartono / (Australia) Olivia Tjandramulia (champions)
4. (Chile) Bárbara Gatica / (Brazil) Rebeca Pereira (quarterfinals)

== Draw ==
=== Key ===
- Q = Qualifier
- WC = Wild card
- LL = Lucky loser
- Alt = Alternate
- ITF = ITF entry
- PR = Protected ranking
- SR = Special ranking
- SE = Special exempt
- JE = Junior exempt
- JR = Junior Accelerator Programme entrant
- CO = College Accelerator Programme entrant
- NG = Next Gen Accelerator Program entrant
- w/o = Walkover
- r = Retired
- d = Defaulted

=== Draw ===
First round
(India) R Bhatia (Colombia) M Herazo González	6	6
(United States) D Ivanova (Germany) J Jebawy	4	0
4	(Chile) B Gatica (Brazil) R Pereira	6	6
(Chile) I Cereso (Chile) A Vergara Rivera	1	0
(Germany) K Gerlach (Chile) D Seguel	6	6
(Chile) M Cannoni (Chile) A Valenzuela	0	0
(Chile) F Astete (United States) A Riley	6	6
(United States) J Snells (Chile) MI Yapur López	2	2
(Chile) MM Torrales Tebes (Chile) J Verdugo	1	0
3	(Netherlands) A Hartono (Australia) O Tjandramulia	6	6
(Chile) M Alcaíno Vergara (Argentina) J Robin	0	0
(Chile) F Labraña (Chile) I Martinich	6	6
(Chile) BL Anticán González (Chile) D López	2	2
2	(Indonesia) B Gumulya (Indonesia) J Rompies	6	6

Quarterfinals
1	(Romania) I Bara (Georgia (country)) E Gorgodze	6	6
(India) R Bhatia (Colombia) M Herazo González	4	3
4	(Chile) B Gatica (Brazil) R Pereira	7	3	[6]
(Germany) K Gerlach (Chile) D Seguel	5	6	[10]
(Chile) F Astete (United States) A Riley	0	1
3	(Netherlands) A Hartono (Australia) O Tjandramulia	6	6
(Chile) F Labraña (Chile) I Martinich	3	1
2	(Indonesia) B Gumulya (Indonesia) J Rompies	6	6

Semifinals
1	(Romania) I Bara (Georgia (country)) E Gorgodze	7^{10}	2	[6]
(Germany) K Gerlach (Chile) D Seguel	6^{8}	6	[10]
3	(Netherlands) A Hartono (Australia) O Tjandramulia	6	6
2	(Indonesia) B Gumulya (Indonesia) J Rompies	2	0

Final
(Germany) K Gerlach (Chile) D Seguel	1	3
3	(Netherlands) A Hartono (Australia) O Tjandramulia	6	6
