= 2021 Copa LP Chile – Singles =

Singles
- 2021 Copa LP Chile

Final
- Champion: (Hungary) Anna Bondár
- Runner-up: (Paraguay) Verónica Cepede Royg
- Score: 6–2, 6–3

Events
Singles	Doubles
← 2019 ·	Copa LP Chile	· 2022 →

Elisabetta Cocciaretto was the defending champion but chose not to participate.

Anna Bondár won the title, defeating Verónica Cepede Royg in the final, 6–2, 6–3.

== Seeds ==
1. (Brazil) Beatriz Haddad Maia (quarterfinals)
2. (Hungary) Anna Bondár (champion)
3. (Romania) Irina Bara (quarterfinals)
4. (Georgia (country)) Ekaterine Gorgodze (quarterfinals)
5. (France) Diane Parry (semifinals)
6. (Chile) Daniela Seguel (first round)
7. (Netherlands) Arianne Hartono (semifinals)
8. (Germany) Katharina Gerlach (second round)

== Draw ==
=== Key ===
- Q = Qualifier
- WC = Wild card
- LL = Lucky loser
- Alt = Alternate
- ITF = ITF entry
- PR = Protected ranking
- SR = Special ranking
- SE = Special exempt
- JE = Junior exempt
- JR = Junior Accelerator Programme entrant
- CO = College Accelerator Programme entrant
- NG = Next Gen Accelerator Program entrant
- w/o = Walkover
- r = Retired
- d = Defaulted

=== Finals ===
Semifinals
5	(France) Diane Parry	2	5
(Paraguay) Verónica Cepede Royg	6	7
7	(Netherlands) Arianne Hartono	1	6^{5}
2	(Hungary) Anna Bondár	6	7^{7}

Final
(Paraguay) Verónica Cepede Royg	2	3
2	(Hungary) Anna Bondár	6	6

=== Top half ===
First round
1	(Brazil) B Haddad Maia	6	6
Q	(United States) J Snells	2	1
WC	(Chile) F Astete	6	7^{7}
Q	(United States) A Riley	0	6^{2}
Q	(Indonesia) J Rompies	4	1
(United States) D Ivanova	6	6
(Brazil) R Pereira	1	1
5	(France) D Parry	6	6
4	(Georgia (country)) E Gorgodze	6	6
Q	(Chile) M Cannoni	0	0
(Colombia) M Herazo González	6	6
WC	(Chile) D López	0	2
(India) R Bhatia	6	4	6
Q	(Germany) J Jebawy	3	6	2
(Paraguay) V Cepede Royg	7^{7}	6
6	(Chile) D Seguel	6^{5}	1

Second round
1	(Brazil) B Haddad Maia	6	6
WC	(Chile) F Astete	4	2
(United States) D Ivanova	1	0
5	(France) D Parry	6	6
4	(Georgia (country)) E Gorgodze	7	5	6
(Colombia) M Herazo González	5	7	2
(India) R Bhatia	2	2
(Paraguay) V Cepede Royg	6	6

Quarterfinals
1	(Brazil) B Haddad Maia	4	3
5	(France) D Parry	6	6
4	(Georgia (country)) E Gorgodze	1	3
(Paraguay) V Cepede Royg	6	6

Semifinals
5	(France) D Parry	2	5
(Paraguay) V Cepede Royg	6	7

=== Bottom half ===
First round
7	(Netherlands) A Hartono	2	6	6
(Chile) B Gatica	6	3	3
(Chile) I Martinich	1	3
WC	(Chile) F Labraña	6	6
(Indonesia) B Gumulya	6	6
LL	(Chile) MI Yapur López	2	0
WC	(Argentina) S Sierra	3	3
3	(Romania) I Bara	6	6
8	(Germany) K Gerlach	6	6
Q	(Chile) J Verdugo	0	0
LL	(Chile) BL Anticán González	0	0
(Colombia) E Arango	6	6
PR	(Australia) O Tjandramulia	6	6
Q	(Chile) I Cereso	3	3
Q	(Chile) A Vergara Rivera	1	0
2	(Hungary) A Bondár	6	6

Second round
7	(Netherlands) A Hartono	6	6
WC	(Chile) F Labraña	4	1
(Indonesia) B Gumulya	1	1
3	(Romania) I Bara	6	6
8	(Germany) K Gerlach	1	4
(Colombia) E Arango	6	6
PR	(Australia) O Tjandramulia	1	6^{4}
2	(Hungary) A Bondár	6	7^{7}

Quarterfinals
7	(Netherlands) A Hartono	6	6
3	(Romania) I Bara	1	2
(Colombia) E Arango	5	4
2	(Hungary) A Bondár	7	6

Semifinals
7	(Netherlands) A Hartono	1	6^{5}
2	(Hungary) A Bondár	6	7^{7}
