= 2021 Copa LP Chile =

Tennis tournament

- Date: 8–14 November 2021
- Edition: 4th
- Category: ITF Women's World Tennis Tour
- Prize money: $60,000+H
- Surface: Clay / Outdoor
- Location: Santiago, Chile

Champions

Singles
- (Hungary) Anna Bondár

Doubles
- (Netherlands) Arianne Hartono / (Australia) Olivia Tjandramulia
| ← 2019 · | Copa LP Chile | · 2022 → |

The 2021 Copa LP Chile was a professional women's tennis tournament played on outdoor clay courts. It was the fourth edition of the tournament which was part of the 2021 ITF Women's World Tennis Tour. It took place in Santiago, Chile between 8 and 14 November 2021.

== Singles main-draw entrants ==
=== Seeds ===
| Country | Player | Rank^{1} | Seed |
|---|---|---|---|
| BRA | Beatriz Haddad Maia | 85 | 1 |
| HUN | Anna Bondár | 135 | 2 |
| ROU | Irina Bara | 138 | 3 |
| GEO | Ekaterine Gorgodze | 161 | 4 |
| FRA | Diane Parry | 174 | 5 |
| CHI | Daniela Seguel | 211 | 6 |
| NED | Arianne Hartono | 233 | 7 |
| GER | Katharina Gerlach | 243 | 8 |

- ^{1} Rankings are as of 1 November 2021.

=== Other entrants ===
The following players received wildcards into the singles main draw:

- (Chile) Fernanda Astete
- (Chile) Fernanda Labraña
- (Chile) Daniela López
- (Argentina) Solana Sierra

The following player received entry using a protected ranking:

- (Australia) Olivia Tjandramulia

The following players received entry from the qualifying draw:

- (Chile) Macarena Cannoni
- (Chile) Isidora Cereso
- (Germany) Jasmin Jebawy
- (United States) Alexandra Riley
- (Indonesia) Jessy Rompies
- (United States) Jamilah Snells
- (Chile) Javiera Verdugo
- (Chile) Antonia Vergara Rivera

The following players received entry as lucky losers:

- (Chile) Bianca Lia Anticán González
- (Chile) María Ignacia Yapur López

== Champions ==
=== Singles ===
- (Hungary) Anna Bondár def. (Paraguay) Verónica Cepede Royg, 6–2, 6–3

=== Doubles ===
- (Netherlands) Arianne Hartono / (Australia) Olivia Tjandramulia def. (Germany) Katharina Gerlach / (Chile) Daniela Seguel, 6–1, 6–3
