= 2021 Torneig Internacional Els Gorchs – Doubles =

Doubles
- 2021 Torneig Internacional Els Gorchs

Final
- Champions: (Russia) Irina Khromacheva (Australia) Arina Rodionova
- Runners-up: (Switzerland) Susan Bandecchi (United Kingdom) Eden Silva
- Score: 2–6, 6–3, [10–6]

Events
Singles	Doubles
- Torneig Internacional Els Gorchs

Jessika Ponchet and Eden Silva were the defending champions but Ponchet chose to compete at the 2021 Internationaux Féminins de la Vienne instead.

Silva partnered alongside Susan Bandecchi, but lost in the final to Irina Khromacheva and Arina Rodionova, 6–2, 3–6, [6–10].

== Seeds ==
1. (Switzerland) Susan Bandecchi / (United Kingdom) Eden Silva (final)
2. (Russia) Irina Khromacheva / (Australia) Arina Rodionova (champions)
3. (Russia) Oksana Selekhmeteva / (Russia) Anastasia Tikhonova (semifinals)
4. (Spain) Marina Bassols Ribera / (Russia) Alina Charaeva (semifinals)

== Draw ==
Key

- Q = Qualifier
- WC = Wild card
- LL = Lucky loser
- Alt = Alternate
- ITF = ITF entry
- PR = Protected ranking
- SR = Special ranking
- SE = Special exempt
- JE = Junior exempt
- JR = Junior Accelerator Programme entrant
- CO = College Accelerator Programme entrant
- NG = Next Gen Accelerator Program entrant
- w/o = Walkover
- r = Retired
- d = Defaulted

=== Draw ===
First round
1	(Switzerland) S Bandecchi (United Kingdom) E Silva	6	3	[10]
(Romania) E Bogdan (Hungary) RL Jani	4	6	[3]
(Bulgaria) I Shinikova (Latvia) D Vismane	4	6	[12]
(Serbia) O Danilović (Czech Republic) L Fruhvirtová	6	3	[10]
4	(Spain) M Bassols Ribera (Russia) A Charaeva	6	6
WC	(United Kingdom) A Popescu (United States) C Scholl	2	2
(Russia) D Astakhova (Poland) W Falkowska	6	2	[15]
(Spain) I Burillo Escorihuela (Spain) A Lázaro García	1	6	[13]
WC	(Spain) C Cerviño Ruiz (Spain) O Parres Azcoitia	6	2	[10]
(United Kingdom) A Collins (Venezuela) A Gámiz	3	6	[7]
(Latvia) D Marcinkēviča (China) Y Yuan	6^{5}	3
3	(Russia) O Selekhmeteva (Russia) A Tikhonova	7^{7}	6
(Croatia) T Mrdeža (Serbia) N Stevanović	7	7^{7}
WC	(India) R Bhatia (Italy) N Fossa Huergo	5	6^{4}
(Romania) M Bulgaru (United Kingdom) E Webley-Smith	0	2
2	(Russia) I Khromacheva (Australia) Ar Rodionova	6	6

Quarterfinals
1	(Switzerland) S Bandecchi (United Kingdom) E Silva	7	2	[11]
(Bulgaria) I Shinikova (Latvia) D Vismane	5	6	[9]
4	(Spain) M Bassols Ribera (Russia) A Charaeva	7	6
(Russia) D Astakhova (Poland) W Falkowska	5	2
WC	(Spain) C Cerviño Ruiz (Spain) O Parres Azcoitia	6	4	[6]
3	(Russia) O Selekhmeteva (Russia) A Tikhonova	3	6	[10]
(Croatia) T Mrdeža (Serbia) N Stevanović	1	2
2	(Russia) I Khromacheva (Australia) Ar Rodionova	6	6

Semifinals
1	(Switzerland) S Bandecchi (United Kingdom) E Silva	6	6
4	(Spain) M Bassols Ribera (Russia) A Charaeva	3	3
3	(Russia) O Selekhmeteva (Russia) A Tikhonova	2	4
2	(Russia) I Khromacheva (Australia) Ar Rodionova	6	6

Final
1	(Switzerland) S Bandecchi (United Kingdom) E Silva	6	3	[6]
2	(Russia) I Khromacheva (Australia) Ar Rodionova	2	6	[10]
