= 2021 Torneig Internacional Els Gorchs – Singles =

Singles
- 2021 Torneig Internacional Els Gorchs

Final
- Champion: (Belgium) Maryna Zanevska
- Runner-up: (Switzerland) Ylena In-Albon
- Score: 7–6^{(7–5)}, 6–4

Events
Singles	Doubles
- Torneig Internacional Els Gorchs

Katy Dunne was the defending champion but chose not to participate.

Maryna Zanevska won the title, defeating Ylena In-Albon in the final, 7–6^{(7–5)}, 6–4.

== Seeds ==
1. (Netherlands) Arantxa Rus (second round)
2. (Belgium) Maryna Zanevska (champion)
3. (Serbia) Nina Stojanović (semifinals, retired)
4. (Bulgaria) Viktoriya Tomova (first round)
5. (Hungary) Dalma Gálfi (quarterfinals)
6. (Serbia) Olga Danilović (first round)
7. (Australia) Arina Rodionova (semifinals)
8. (Hungary) Réka Luca Jani (second round)

== Draw ==
Key

- Q = Qualifier
- WC = Wild card
- LL = Lucky loser
- Alt = Alternate
- ITF = ITF entry
- PR = Protected ranking
- SR = Special ranking
- SE = Special exempt
- JE = Junior exempt
- JR = Junior Accelerator Programme entrant
- CO = College Accelerator Programme entrant
- NG = Next Gen Accelerator Program entrant
- w/o = Walkover
- r = Retired
- d = Defaulted

=== Finals ===
Semifinals
(Switzerland) Ylena In-Albon	6	6
7	(Australia) Arina Rodionova	4	3
3	(Serbia) Nina Stojanović	3	0^{r}
2	(Belgium) Maryna Zanevska	6	0

Final
(Switzerland) Ylena In-Albon	6^{5}	4
2	(Belgium) Maryna Zanevska	7^{7}	6

=== Top half ===
First round
1	(Netherlands) A Rus	6	4	7
(Switzerland) S Bandecchi	4	6	5
LL	(Chinese Taipei) J Garland	3	3
(Serbia) N Stevanović	6	6
(Bulgaria) I Shinikova	6	6
WC	(Spain) A Carrillo Marín	3	2
(Switzerland) Y In-Albon	3	6	6
6	(Serbia) O Danilović	6	3	4
4	(Bulgaria) V Tomova	1	7^{7}	4
Q	(Czech Republic) L Fruhvirtová	6	6^{4}	6
(Spain) E Guerrero Álvarez	6	7^{7}
(Spain) M Gutiérrez Carrasco	4	6^{1}
(Croatia) T Mrdeža	4	1
Q	(Russia) D Astakhova	6	6
WC	(Spain) M Bassols Ribera	3	3
7	(Australia) Ar Rodionova	6	6

Second round
1	(Netherlands) A Rus	4	6	4
(Serbia) N Stevanović	6	4	6
(Bulgaria) I Shinikova	4	3
(Switzerland) Y In-Albon	6	6
Q	(Czech Republic) L Fruhvirtová	6	6
(Spain) E Guerrero Álvarez	4	1
Q	(Russia) D Astakhova	1	6	6^{5}
7	(Australia) Ar Rodionova	6	2	7^{7}

Quarterfinals
(Serbia) N Stevanović	6	4	6^{1}
(Switzerland) Y In-Albon	4	6	7^{7}
Q	(Czech Republic) L Fruhvirtová	2	6	4
7	(Australia) Ar Rodionova	6	2	6

Semifinals
(Switzerland) Y In-Albon	6	6
7	(Australia) Ar Rodionova	4	3

=== Bottom half ===
First round
8	(Hungary) RL Jani	6	6
PR	(Russia) I Khromacheva	4	3
(Spain) A Lázaro García	7^{7}	6
(Russia) O Selekhmeteva	6^{5}	1
LL	(Italy) N Fossa Huergo	6	6
WC	(Spain) C Hoste Ferrer	1	0
(Spain) I Burillo Escorihuela	3	2
3	(Serbia) N Stojanović	6	6
5	(Hungary) D Gálfi	3	6	6
Q	(Spain) C Cerviño Ruiz	6	4	1
(Russia) A Tikhonova	1	6	6
Q	(Latvia) D Vismane	6	3	4
Q	(China) Y Yuan	7	4	6^{5}
WC	(Spain) G Maristany	5	6	7^{7}
Q	(Russia) A Charaeva	2	7^{7}	4
2	(Belgium) M Zanevska	6	6^{2}	6

Second round
8	(Hungary) RL Jani	1	3
(Spain) A Lázaro García	6	6
LL	(Italy) N Fossa Huergo	2	3
3	(Serbia) N Stojanović	6	6
5	(Hungary) D Gálfi	6	7^{7}
(Russia) A Tikhonova	1	6^{5}
WC	(Spain) G Maristany	4	1
2	(Belgium) M Zanevska	6	6

Quarterfinals
(Spain) A Lázaro García	5	3
3	(Serbia) N Stojanović	7	6
5	(Hungary) D Gálfi	0	2
2	(Belgium) M Zanevska	6	6

Semifinals
3	(Serbia) N Stojanović	3	0^{r}
2	(Belgium) M Zanevska	6	0
