= 2021 Torneig Internacional Els Gorchs =

Tennis tournament

- Date: 25–31 October 2021
- Edition: 10th
- Category: ITF Women's World Tennis Tour
- Prize money: $80,000+H
- Surface: Hard
- Location: Les Franqueses del Vallès, Spain

Champions

Singles
- (Belgium) Maryna Zanevska

Doubles
- (Russia) Irina Khromacheva / (Australia) Arina Rodionova
- Torneig Internacional Els Gorchs

The 2021 Torneig Internacional Els Gorchs was a professional women's tennis tournament played on outdoor hard courts. It was the tenth edition of the tournament which was part of the 2021 ITF Women's World Tennis Tour. It took place in Les Franqueses del Vallès, France between 25 and 31 October 2021.

== Singles main-draw entrants ==
=== Seeds ===
Country	Player	Rank^{1}	Seed
NED	Arantxa Rus	61	1
BEL	Maryna Zanevska	102	2
SRB	Nina Stojanović	110	3
BUL	Viktoriya Tomova	111	4
HUN	Dalma Gálfi	124	5
SRB	Olga Danilović	126	6
AUS	Arina Rodionova	160	7
HUN	Réka Luca Jani	177	8

- ^{1} Rankings are as of 18 October 2021.

=== Other entrants ===
The following players received wildcards into the singles main draw:

- (Spain) Marina Bassols Ribera
- (Spain) Alba Carrillo Marín
- (Spain) Claudia Hoste Ferrer
- (Spain) Guiomar Maristany

The following player received entry using a protected ranking:

- (Russia) Irina Khromacheva

The following players received entry from the qualifying draw:

- (Russia) Darya Astakhova
- (Spain) Celia Cerviño Ruiz
- (Russia) Alina Charaeva
- (Czech Republic) Linda Fruhvirtová
- (Latvia) Daniela Vismane
- (China) Yuan Yue

The following players received entry as lucky losers:

- (Italy) Nicole Fossa Huergo
- (Chinese Taipei) Joanna Garland

== Champions ==
=== Singles ===
- (Belgium) Maryna Zanevska def. (Switzerland) Ylena In-Albon, 7–6^{(7–5)}, 6–4

=== Doubles ===
- (Russia) Irina Khromacheva / (Australia) Arina Rodionova def. (Switzerland) Susan Bandecchi / (United Kingdom) Eden Silva, 2–6, 6–3, [10–6]
