= Fernanda Astete =

Chilean tennis player

- Country (sports): Chile
- Born: 12 January 1997 (age 29) Santiago, Chile
- Height: 1.60 m (5 ft 3 in)
- Plays: Right (two-handed backhand)
- College: Rice University
- Prize money: $14,296

Singles
- Career record: 31–45
- Highest ranking: No. 701 (17 October 2022)

Doubles
- Career record: 38–30
- Career titles: 1 ITF
- Highest ranking: No. 628 (17 October 2022)

Fernanda Paz Astete Rojas (born 12 January 1997) is a Chilean former tennis player.

Astete has a career-high singles ranking by the Women's Tennis Association (WTA) of 701, achieved on 17 October. She also has a career-high doubles ranking by the WTA of 628, achieved on the same date.

Astete competed for Chile in the Billie Jean King Cup with a win/loss record of 1–0.

She attended college at Rice University.

== ITF Circuit finals ==
=== Doubles: 6 (1 title, 5 runner-ups) ===
Legend $25,000 tournaments $15,000 tournaments	Finals by surface Hard (0–1) Clay (1–4)

Result	W–L	Date	Tournament	Tier	Surface	Partner	Opponents	Score
Loss	0–1	Oct 2021	ITF Piracicaba, Brazil	15,000	Clay	(Argentina) Victoria Bosio	(United States) Sabastiani León (Germany) Luisa Meyer auf der Heide	2–6, 0–3 ret.
Loss	0–2	Nov 2021	ITF Cundinamarca, Colombia	15,000	Clay	(Colombia) Jessica Plazas	(United States) Hurricane Tyra Black (United States) Rushri Wijesundera	6–7^{(11)}, 7–5, [4–10]
Loss	0–3	Nov 2021	ITF Guatemala City	15,000	Hard	(United States) Hurricane Tyra Black	(United States) Paris Corley (United States) Lexington Reed	6–4, 6–7^{(1)}, [5–10]
Loss	0–4	Apr 2022	ITF Piracicaba, Brazil	15,000	Clay	(Switzerland) Marie Mettraux	(United States) Sabastiani León (Czech Republic) Laetitia Pulchartová	4–6, 6–7^{(4)}
Loss	0–5	Apr 2022	ITF São Paulo, Brazil	15,000	Clay	(Mexico) Marian Gómez Pezuela	(Argentina) Martina Capurro Taborda (Chile) Fernanda Labraña	2–6, 1–6
Win	1–5	Dec 2022	ITF Buenos Aires, Argentina	15,000	Clay	(Peru) Anastasia Iamachkine	(Mexico) Marian Gómez Pezuela (Argentina) María Victoria Marchesini	7–5, 6–4
