= 2019 ITF Women's World Tennis Tour (July–September) =

The 2019 ITF Women's World Tennis Tour is the 2019 edition of the second tier tour for women's professional tennis. It is organised by the International Tennis Federation and is a tier below the WTA Tour. The ITF Women's World Tennis Tour includes tournaments with prize money ranging from $15,000 up to $100,000.

== Key ==
Category
W100 tournaments
W80 tournaments
W60 tournaments
W25 tournaments
W15 tournaments

== Month ==
=== July ===
Week of	Tournament	Winner	Runners-up	Semifinalists	Quarterfinalists
July 1	Tianjin Health Industry Park; Tianjin, China; Hard; W25; Singles and Doubles Draws	(China) Wang Xinyu; 6–4, 6–2	(Serbia) Jovana Jakšić	(Russia) Anastasia Gasanova (Bulgaria) Aleksandrina Naydenova	(Canada) Carol Zhao (China) Gao Xinyu (China) Liu Fangzhou (China) Xun Fangying
July 1	Tianjin Health Industry Park; Tianjin, China; Hard; W25; Singles and Doubles Draws	(China) Jiang Xinyu (China) Tang Qianhui; 7–5, 6–2	(China) Wu Meixu (China) Zheng Wushuang	(Russia) Anastasia Gasanova (Bulgaria) Aleksandrina Naydenova	(Canada) Carol Zhao (China) Gao Xinyu (China) Liu Fangzhou (China) Xun Fangying
July 1	Open Porte du Hainaut; Denain, France; Clay; W25; Singles and Doubles Draws	(Luxembourg) Eléonora Molinaro; 6–4, 1–6, 6–3	(Germany) Katharina Hobgarski	(Italy) Sara Errani (Bulgaria) Elitsa Kostova	(Colombia) María Herazo González (France) Amandine Hesse (Spain) Olga Sáez Larra (Ukraine) Valeriya Strakhova
July 1	Open Porte du Hainaut; Denain, France; Clay; W25; Singles and Doubles Draws	(Russia) Daria Mishina (China) Xu Shilin; 6–0, 7–5	(Chile) Bárbara Gatica (Brazil) Rebeca Pereira	(Italy) Sara Errani (Bulgaria) Elitsa Kostova	(Colombia) María Herazo González (France) Amandine Hesse (Spain) Olga Sáez Larra (Ukraine) Valeriya Strakhova
July 1	Stuttgart, Germany; Clay; W25; Singles and Doubles Draws	(Romania) Georgia Crăciun; 6–2, 6–3	(Belarus) Olga Govortsova	(Austria) Barbara Haas (Poland) Maja Chwalińska	(Serbia) Natalija Kostić (Belgium) Marie Benoît (Liechtenstein) Kathinka von Deichmann (Czech Republic) Anastasia Dețiuc
July 1	Stuttgart, Germany; Clay; W25; Singles and Doubles Draws	(Russia) Alena Fomina (Slovakia) Vivien Juhászová; 2–6, 6–2, [14–12]	(Serbia) Tamara Čurović (United States) Chiara Scholl	(Austria) Barbara Haas (Poland) Maja Chwalińska	(Serbia) Natalija Kostić (Belgium) Marie Benoît (Liechtenstein) Kathinka von Deichmann (Czech Republic) Anastasia Dețiuc
July 1	Biella, Italy; Clay; W25; Singles and Doubles Draws	(Ukraine) Katarina Zavatska; 6–1, 6–3	(Egypt) Mayar Sherif	(Italy) Lucia Bronzetti (Hungary) Réka Luca Jani	(Brazil) Paula Cristina Gonçalves (Brazil) Gabriela Cé (Romania) Jaqueline Cristian (Italy) Bianca Turati
July 1	Biella, Italy; Clay; W25; Singles and Doubles Draws	(Romania) Elena Bogdan (Hungary) Réka Luca Jani; 6–1, 6–3	(Japan) Chihiro Muramatsu (Japan) Yuki Naito	(Italy) Lucia Bronzetti (Hungary) Réka Luca Jani	(Brazil) Paula Cristina Gonçalves (Brazil) Gabriela Cé (Romania) Jaqueline Cristian (Italy) Bianca Turati
July 1	The Hague, Netherlands; Clay; W25; Singles and Doubles Draws	(Netherlands) Arantxa Rus; 6–2, 6–2	(Russia) Valentina Ivakhnenko	(United States) Allie Kiick (Croatia) Lea Bošković	(Turkey) Çağla Büyükakçay (Belgium) Lara Salden (Netherlands) Quirine Lemoine (Netherlands) Suzan Lamens
July 1	The Hague, Netherlands; Clay; W25; Singles and Doubles Draws	(Greece) Valentini Grammatikopoulou (Netherlands) Quirine Lemoine; 6–2, 5–7, [10–3]	(Australia) Gabriella Da Silva-Fick (Germany) Anna Klasen	(United States) Allie Kiick (Croatia) Lea Bošković	(Turkey) Çağla Büyükakçay (Belgium) Lara Salden (Netherlands) Quirine Lemoine (Netherlands) Suzan Lamens
July 1	Corroios, Portugal; Hard; W25; Singles and Doubles Draws	(Turkey) Pemra Özgen; 3–6, 6–4, 6–3	(France) Océane Dodin	(Spain) Júlia Payola (Spain) Eva Guerrero Álvarez	(Japan) Yuriko Lily Miyazaki (Latvia) Diāna Marcinkēviča (New Zealand) Paige Hourigan (Georgia (country)) Mariam Bolkvadze
July 1	Corroios, Portugal; Hard; W25; Singles and Doubles Draws	(Australia) Alison Bai (New Zealand) Paige Hourigan; 3–6, 6–2, [14–12]	(Portugal) Francisca Jorge (Spain) Olga Parres Azcoitia	(Spain) Júlia Payola (Spain) Eva Guerrero Álvarez	(Japan) Yuriko Lily Miyazaki (Latvia) Diāna Marcinkēviča (New Zealand) Paige Hourigan (Georgia (country)) Mariam Bolkvadze
July 1	Cancún, Mexico; Hard; W15; Singles and Doubles Draws	(Brazil) Ingrid Gamarra Martins; 7–6^{(7–3)}, 7–6^{(7–4)}	(Brazil) Thaisa Grana Pedretti	(United States) Rianna Valdes (United States) Elle Christensen	(United States) Rushri Wijesundera (Guatemala) Kirsten-Andrea Weedon (Argentina) María Lourdes Carlé (China) Chen Yu
July 1	Cancún, Mexico; Hard; W15; Singles and Doubles Draws	(United States) Hind Abdelouahid (Russia) Maria Kozyreva; 7–6^{(7–0)}, 6–4	(Brazil) Ingrid Gamarra Martins (Brazil) Eduarda Piai	(United States) Rianna Valdes (United States) Elle Christensen	(United States) Rushri Wijesundera (Guatemala) Kirsten-Andrea Weedon (Argentina) María Lourdes Carlé (China) Chen Yu
July 1	Prokuplje, Serbia; Clay; W15; Singles and Doubles Draws	(Australia) Seone Mendez; 6–2, 6–3	(Spain) Ana Lantigua de la Nuez	(Turkey) İpek Öz (Poland) Anna Hertel	(Ukraine) Viktoriia Dema (Russia) Darya Astakhova (Bosnia and Herzegovina) Nefisa Berberović (Croatia) Oleksandra Oliynykova
July 1	Prokuplje, Serbia; Clay; W15; Singles and Doubles Draws	(Turkey) İpek Öz (Turkey) Melis Sezer; 7–5, 7–5	(Bosnia and Herzegovina) Nefisa Berberović (Slovenia) Veronika Erjavec	(Turkey) İpek Öz (Poland) Anna Hertel	(Ukraine) Viktoriia Dema (Russia) Darya Astakhova (Bosnia and Herzegovina) Nefisa Berberović (Croatia) Oleksandra Oliynykova
July 1	Hua Hin, Thailand; Hard; W15; Singles and Doubles Draws	(France) Lou Brouleau; 6–2, 6–3	(Thailand) Bunyawi Thamchaiwat	(South Korea) Kim Da-hye (Algeria) Inès Ibbou	(Japan) Mei Yamaguchi (India) Zeel Desai (Japan) Himeno Sakatsume (Thailand) Patcharin Cheapchandej
July 1	Hua Hin, Thailand; Hard; W15; Singles and Doubles Draws	(Japan) Robu Kajitani (Japan) Aiko Yoshitomi; 6–2, 5–7, [10–6]	(France) Lou Brouleau (Japan) Ayaka Okuno	(South Korea) Kim Da-hye (Algeria) Inès Ibbou	(Japan) Mei Yamaguchi (India) Zeel Desai (Japan) Himeno Sakatsume (Thailand) Patcharin Cheapchandej
July 1	Tabarka, Tunisia; Clay; W15; Singles and Doubles Draws	(Italy) Anna Turati; 6–4, 7–6^{(7–4)}	(Austria) Yvonne Neuwirth	(Netherlands) Diana Chehoudi (Argentina) Martina Capurro Taborda	(Brazil) Karolayne Alexandre da Rosa (Georgia (country)) Zoziya Kardava (Bolivia) Noelia Zeballos (Bulgaria) Julia Stamatova
July 1	Tabarka, Tunisia; Clay; W15; Singles and Doubles Draws	(Romania) Ioana Gașpar (Colombia) Yuliana Lizarazo; 7–5, 6–3	(Slovakia) Alica Rusová (Bolivia) Noelia Zeballos	(Netherlands) Diana Chehoudi (Argentina) Martina Capurro Taborda	(Brazil) Karolayne Alexandre da Rosa (Georgia (country)) Zoziya Kardava (Bolivia) Noelia Zeballos (Bulgaria) Julia Stamatova
July 8	Grand Est Open 88; Contrexéville, France; Clay; W100; Singles Draw – Doubles Draw	(Ukraine) Katarina Zavatska; 6–4, 6–4	(Norway) Ulrikke Eikeri	(Italy) Martina Trevisan (Switzerland) Stefanie Vögele	(Spain) Georgina García Pérez (France) Tessah Andrianjafitrimo (Spain) Cristina Bucșa (France) Sara Cakarevic
July 8	Grand Est Open 88; Contrexéville, France; Clay; W100; Singles Draw – Doubles Draw	(Spain) Georgina García Pérez (Georgia (country)) Oksana Kalashnikova; 6–3, 6–3	(Kazakhstan) Anna Danilina (Netherlands) Eva Wacanno	(Italy) Martina Trevisan (Switzerland) Stefanie Vögele	(Spain) Georgina García Pérez (France) Tessah Andrianjafitrimo (Spain) Cristina Bucșa (France) Sara Cakarevic
July 8	Reinert Open; Versmold, Germany; Clay; W60; Singles Draw – Doubles Draw	(Serbia) Nina Stojanović; 6–0, 7–5	(Germany) Katharina Hobgarski	(Netherlands) Bibiane Schoofs (Germany) Jule Niemeier	(Czech Republic) Lucie Hradecká (United States) Louisa Chirico (Brazil) Teliana Pereira (Romania) Irina Bara
July 8	Reinert Open; Versmold, Germany; Clay; W60; Singles Draw – Doubles Draw	(Russia) Amina Anshba (Czech Republic) Anastasia Dețiuc; 0–6, 6–3, [10–8]	(India) Ankita Raina (Netherlands) Bibiane Schoofs	(Netherlands) Bibiane Schoofs (Germany) Jule Niemeier	(Czech Republic) Lucie Hradecká (United States) Louisa Chirico (Brazil) Teliana Pereira (Romania) Irina Bara
July 8	Tennis Championships of Honolulu; Honolulu, United States; Hard; W60; Singles Draw – Doubles Draw	(United States) Usue Maitane Arconada; 6–0, 6–2	(United States) Nicole Gibbs	(United States) Jamie Loeb (United States) Caroline Dolehide	(United States) Whitney Osuigwe (Japan) Mayo Hibi (United States) Kayla Day (United States) Quinn Gleason
July 8	Tennis Championships of Honolulu; Honolulu, United States; Hard; W60; Singles Draw – Doubles Draw	(United States) Hayley Carter (United States) Jamie Loeb; 6–4, 6–4	(United States) Usue Maitane Arconada (United States) Caroline Dolehide	(United States) Jamie Loeb (United States) Caroline Dolehide	(United States) Whitney Osuigwe (Japan) Mayo Hibi (United States) Kayla Day (United States) Quinn Gleason
July 8	Saskatoon, Canada; Hard; W25; Singles and Doubles Draws	(Australia) Maddison Inglis; 6–4, 2–6, 6–4	(Canada) Katherine Sebov	(Mexico) Marcela Zacarías (Japan) Haruka Kaji	(Australia) Olivia Tjandramulia (United States) Hanna Chang (United States) Madison Westby (Canada) Carol Zhao
July 8	Saskatoon, Canada; Hard; W25; Singles and Doubles Draws	(Chinese Taipei) Hsu Chieh-yu (Mexico) Marcela Zacarías; 6–3, 6–2	(Japan) Haruka Kaji (Japan) Momoko Kobori	(Mexico) Marcela Zacarías (Japan) Haruka Kaji	(Australia) Olivia Tjandramulia (United States) Hanna Chang (United States) Madison Westby (Canada) Carol Zhao
July 8	Ulanqab, China; Hard; W25; Singles and Doubles Draws	(China) Lu Jiajing; 6–7^{(9–11)}, 6–3, 6–3	(China) Yuan Yue	(China) Guo Meiqi (China) Liu Fangzhou	(China) Xun Fangying (Japan) Kyōka Okamura (Bulgaria) Aleksandrina Naydenova (Serbia) Jovana Jakšić
July 8	Ulanqab, China; Hard; W25; Singles and Doubles Draws	(Japan) Kyōka Okamura (Thailand) Peangtarn Plipuech; 4–6, 7–5, [13–11]	(China) Sun Xuliu (China) Wang Meiling	(China) Guo Meiqi (China) Liu Fangzhou	(China) Xun Fangying (Japan) Kyōka Okamura (Bulgaria) Aleksandrina Naydenova (Serbia) Jovana Jakšić
July 8	Turin, Italy; Clay; W25; Singles and Doubles Draws	(Japan) Yuki Naito; 6–3, 6–4	(Italy) Elisabetta Cocciaretto	(Italy) Claudia Giovine (Switzerland) Simona Waltert	(Russia) Valentina Ivakhnenko (Italy) Anastasia Grymalska (Russia) Maria Marfutina (Italy) Angelica Moratelli
July 8	Turin, Italy; Clay; W25; Singles and Doubles Draws	(Japan) Chihiro Muramatsu (Japan) Yuki Naito; 6–0, 6–2	(Egypt) Mayar Sherif (Norway) Melanie Stokke	(Italy) Claudia Giovine (Switzerland) Simona Waltert	(Russia) Valentina Ivakhnenko (Italy) Anastasia Grymalska (Russia) Maria Marfutina (Italy) Angelica Moratelli
July 8	Getxo, Spain; Clay (indoor); W25; Singles and Doubles Draws	(Greece) Despina Papamichail; 6–2, 6–4	(Egypt) Sandra Samir	(Spain) Irene Burillo Escorihuela (Mexico) Ana Sofía Sánchez	(Argentina) Nadia Podoroska (Russia) Anastasiya Komardina (Spain) Claudia Hoste Ferrer (Belgium) Magali Kempen
July 8	Getxo, Spain; Clay (indoor); W25; Singles and Doubles Draws	(North Macedonia) Lina Gjorcheska (Russia) Anastasiya Komardina; 6–3, 7–6^{(7–4)}	(Hungary) Vanda Lukács (Switzerland) Nina Stadler	(Spain) Irene Burillo Escorihuela (Mexico) Ana Sofía Sánchez	(Argentina) Nadia Podoroska (Russia) Anastasiya Komardina (Spain) Claudia Hoste Ferrer (Belgium) Magali Kempen
July 8	Cancún, Mexico; Hard; W15; Singles and Doubles Draws	(United States) Adriana Reami; 6–3, 6–2	(Sweden) Linnéa Malmqvist	(Argentina) María Lourdes Carlé (United States) Angela Kulikov	(Guatemala) Kirsten-Andrea Weedon (Brazil) Thaisa Grana Pedretti (Canada) Alexandra Mikhailuk (Israel) Lina Glushko
July 8	Cancún, Mexico; Hard; W15; Singles and Doubles Draws	(Brazil) Ingrid Gamarra Martins (Brazil) Eduarda Piai; 6–7^{(1–7)}, 7–5, [11–9]	(United States) Angela Kulikov (United States) Rianna Valdes	(Argentina) María Lourdes Carlé (United States) Angela Kulikov	(Guatemala) Kirsten-Andrea Weedon (Brazil) Thaisa Grana Pedretti (Canada) Alexandra Mikhailuk (Israel) Lina Glushko
July 8	Lima, Peru; Clay; W15; Singles and Doubles Draws	(Argentina) Catalina Pella; 4–6, 6–3, 6–4	(Paraguay) Lara Escauriza	(United States) Akilah James (Peru) Dominique Schaefer	(Canada) Bianca Fernandez (Venezuela) Nadia Echeverría Alam (Canada) Raphaëlle Lacasse (Peru) Camila Soares
July 8	Lima, Peru; Clay; W15; Singles and Doubles Draws	(United States) Madeleine Kobelt (Russia) Anna Makhorkina; 7–5, 2–6, [10–4]	(Venezuela) Nadia Echeverría Alam (Paraguay) Lara Escauriza	(United States) Akilah James (Peru) Dominique Schaefer	(Canada) Bianca Fernandez (Venezuela) Nadia Echeverría Alam (Canada) Raphaëlle Lacasse (Peru) Camila Soares
July 8	Bucharest, Romania; Clay; W15; Singles and Doubles Draws	(Romania) Georgia Crăciun; 7–5, 6–2	(Germany) Laura Schaeder	(Russia) Valeriya Urzhumova (Romania) Ilona Georgiana Ghioroaie	(Russia) Maria Shusharina (Serbia) Bojana Marinković (Romania) Gabriela Nicole Tătăruș (Italy) Federica Arcidiacono
July 8	Bucharest, Romania; Clay; W15; Singles and Doubles Draws	(Romania) Oana Smaranda Corneanu (Romania) Oana Gavrilă; 5–7, 6–4, [10–4]	(Czech Republic) Kristýna Hrabalová (Czech Republic) Barbora Miklová	(Russia) Valeriya Urzhumova (Romania) Ilona Georgiana Ghioroaie	(Russia) Maria Shusharina (Serbia) Bojana Marinković (Romania) Gabriela Nicole Tătăruș (Italy) Federica Arcidiacono
July 8	Prokuplje, Serbia; Clay; W15; Singles and Doubles Draws	(Australia) Seone Mendez; 6–4, 6–1	(Russia) Darya Astakhova	(Bosnia and Herzegovina) Anita Husarić (Slovenia) Veronika Erjavec	(Japan) Satsuki Takamura (Serbia) Mihaela Đaković (Ukraine) Viktoriia Dema (Bulgaria) Petia Arshinkova
July 8	Prokuplje, Serbia; Clay; W15; Singles and Doubles Draws	(Russia) Darya Astakhova (Slovakia) Laura Svatíková; 6–3, 0–6, [10–6]	(Bosnia and Herzegovina) Nefisa Berberović (Slovenia) Veronika Erjavec	(Bosnia and Herzegovina) Anita Husarić (Slovenia) Veronika Erjavec	(Japan) Satsuki Takamura (Serbia) Mihaela Đaković (Ukraine) Viktoriia Dema (Bulgaria) Petia Arshinkova
July 8	Hua Hin, Thailand; Hard; W15; Singles and Doubles Draws	(France) Lou Brouleau; 6–4, 6–3	(Japan) Himari Sato	(Thailand) Watsachol Sawatdee (Thailand) Bunyawi Thamchaiwat	(Japan) Mei Yamaguchi (Japan) Aiko Yoshitomi (India) Sowjanya Bavisetti (South Korea) Kim Da-hye
July 8	Hua Hin, Thailand; Hard; W15; Singles and Doubles Draws	(Thailand) Patcharin Cheapchandej (China) Ni Ma Zhuoma; 6–3, 6–2	(Thailand) Anchisa Chanta (Thailand) Supapitch Kuearum	(Thailand) Watsachol Sawatdee (Thailand) Bunyawi Thamchaiwat	(Japan) Mei Yamaguchi (Japan) Aiko Yoshitomi (India) Sowjanya Bavisetti (South Korea) Kim Da-hye
July 8	Tabarka, Tunisia; Clay; W15; Singles and Doubles Draws	(Colombia) Yuliana Lizarazo; 6–3, 6–0	(Sweden) Louise Brunskog	(Italy) Andrea Agostina Farulla Di Palma (Argentina) Martina Capurro Taborda	(Czech Republic) Anna Sisková (Romania) Ioana Gașpar (Belarus) Sadafmoh Tolibova (Italy) Gloria Ceschi
July 8	Tabarka, Tunisia; Clay; W15; Singles and Doubles Draws	(Argentina) Martina Capurro Taborda (Colombia) Yuliana Lizarazo; 6–2, 6–1	(Netherlands) Diana Chehoudi (Netherlands) Noa Liauw a Fong	(Italy) Andrea Agostina Farulla Di Palma (Argentina) Martina Capurro Taborda	(Czech Republic) Anna Sisková (Romania) Ioana Gașpar (Belarus) Sadafmoh Tolibova (Italy) Gloria Ceschi
July 15	Open de Biarritz; Biarritz, France; Clay; W80; Singles Draw – Doubles Draw	(Bulgaria) Viktoriya Tomova; 6–2, 5–7, 7–5	(Montenegro) Danka Kovinić	(Paraguay) Verónica Cepede Royg (France) Jessika Ponchet	(Bulgaria) Elitsa Kostova (Czech Republic) Anastasia Zarycká (France) Irina Ramialison (Netherlands) Bibiane Schoofs
July 15	Open de Biarritz; Biarritz, France; Clay; W80; Singles Draw – Doubles Draw	(France) Manon Arcangioli (Belgium) Kimberley Zimmermann; 2–6, 6–3, [10–6]	(Mexico) Victoria Rodríguez (Romania) Ioana Loredana Roșca	(Paraguay) Verónica Cepede Royg (France) Jessika Ponchet	(Bulgaria) Elitsa Kostova (Czech Republic) Anastasia Zarycká (France) Irina Ramialison (Netherlands) Bibiane Schoofs
July 15	President's Cup; Nur-Sultan, Kazakhstan; Hard; W80; Singles Draw – Doubles Draw	(Czech Republic) Marie Bouzková; 6–3, 6–3	(Serbia) Natalija Kostić	(Belarus) Iryna Shymanovich (Georgia (country)) Mariam Bolkvadze	(Turkey) Çağla Büyükakçay (Germany) Vivian Heisen (China) Wang Xinyu (Russia) Anastasia Zakharova
July 15	President's Cup; Nur-Sultan, Kazakhstan; Hard; W80; Singles Draw – Doubles Draw	(Czech Republic) Marie Bouzková (Germany) Vivian Heisen; 7–6^{(10–8)}, 6–1	(Russia) Vlada Koval (Russia) Kamilla Rakhimova	(Belarus) Iryna Shymanovich (Georgia (country)) Mariam Bolkvadze	(Turkey) Çağla Büyükakçay (Germany) Vivian Heisen (China) Wang Xinyu (Russia) Anastasia Zakharova
July 15	Berkeley Tennis Club Challenge; Berkeley, United States; Hard; W60; Singles Draw – Doubles Draw	(United States) Madison Brengle; 7–5, 6–4	(Japan) Mayo Hibi	(United States) Kristie Ahn (United States) Sachia Vickery	(United States) Gail Brodsky (Australia) Arina Rodionova (South Korea) Han Na-lae (United States) Caroline Dolehide
July 15	Berkeley Tennis Club Challenge; Berkeley, United States; Hard; W60; Singles Draw – Doubles Draw	(United States) Madison Brengle (United States) Sachia Vickery; 6–3, 7–5	(United States) Francesca Di Lorenzo (United Kingdom) Katie Swan	(United States) Kristie Ahn (United States) Sachia Vickery	(United States) Gail Brodsky (Australia) Arina Rodionova (South Korea) Han Na-lae (United States) Caroline Dolehide
July 15	Challenger de Gatineau; Gatineau, Canada; Hard; W25; Singles and Doubles Draws	(Canada) Leylah Annie Fernandez; 3–6, 6–1, 6–2	(Canada) Carson Branstine	(Canada) Françoise Abanda (Switzerland) Susan Bandecchi	(United States) Victoria Emma (Mexico) Marcela Zacarías (United States) Sophie Chang (United States) Quinn Gleason
July 15	Challenger de Gatineau; Gatineau, Canada; Hard; W25; Singles and Doubles Draws	(Canada) Leylah Annie Fernandez (Canada) Rebecca Marino; 7–6^{(7–5)}, 6–3	(Chinese Taipei) Hsu Chieh-yu (Mexico) Marcela Zacarías	(Canada) Françoise Abanda (Switzerland) Susan Bandecchi	(United States) Victoria Emma (Mexico) Marcela Zacarías (United States) Sophie Chang (United States) Quinn Gleason
July 15	Qujing, China; Hard (indoor); W25; Singles and Doubles Draws	(Bulgaria) Aleksandrina Naydenova; 7–5, 6–3	(China) Yang Yidi	(China) Sun Xuliu (China) Ma Yexin	(Japan) Erika Sema (Thailand) Peangtarn Plipuech (Australia) Alana Parnaby (Japan) Mana Ayukawa
July 15	Qujing, China; Hard (indoor); W25; Singles and Doubles Draws	(Japan) Mana Ayukawa (Japan) Erika Sema; 6–2, 6–3	(China) Kang Jiaqi (Thailand) Peangtarn Plipuech	(China) Sun Xuliu (China) Ma Yexin	(Japan) Erika Sema (Thailand) Peangtarn Plipuech (Australia) Alana Parnaby (Japan) Mana Ayukawa
July 15	ITS Cup; Olomouc, Czech Republic; Clay; W25; Singles and Doubles Draws	(Czech Republic) Jesika Malečková; 6–3, 6–4	(Turkey) İpek Soylu	(Czech Republic) Anastasia Dețiuc (Czech Republic) Johana Marková	(Slovakia) Chantal Škamlová (Norway) Ulrikke Eikeri (Czech Republic) Denisa Allertová (Germany) Tayisiya Morderger
July 15	ITS Cup; Olomouc, Czech Republic; Clay; W25; Singles and Doubles Draws	(Czech Republic) Anastasia Dețiuc (Czech Republic) Johana Marková; 6–3, 4–6, [11–9]	(Czech Republic) Jesika Malečková (Slovakia) Chantal Škamlová	(Czech Republic) Anastasia Dețiuc (Czech Republic) Johana Marková	(Slovakia) Chantal Škamlová (Norway) Ulrikke Eikeri (Czech Republic) Denisa Allertová (Germany) Tayisiya Morderger
July 15	Aschaffenburg, Germany; Clay; W25; Singles and Doubles Draws	(Greece) Despina Papamichail; 6–2, 5–7, 6–2	(Germany) Jule Niemeier	(Germany) Katharina Gerlach (Germany) Katharina Hobgarski	(Russia) Ekaterina Makarova (Germany) Anna-Lena Friedsam (Australia) Ivana Popovic (Australia) Gabriella Da Silva-Fick
July 15	Aschaffenburg, Germany; Clay; W25; Singles and Doubles Draws	(Italy) Tatiana Pieri (Australia) Ivana Popovic; 7–6^{(7–5)}, 6–4	(Spain) Irene Burillo Escorihuela (Greece) Despina Papamichail	(Germany) Katharina Gerlach (Germany) Katharina Hobgarski	(Russia) Ekaterina Makarova (Germany) Anna-Lena Friedsam (Australia) Ivana Popovic (Australia) Gabriella Da Silva-Fick
July 15	Baja, Hungary; Clay; W25; Singles and Doubles Draws	(Hungary) Réka Luca Jani; 6–3, 2–6, 6–2	(Egypt) Mayar Sherif	(Hungary) Dalma Gálfi (Belgium) Lara Salden	(Slovakia) Vivien Juhászová (Croatia) Tena Lukas (Serbia) Dejana Radanović (Bulgaria) Petia Arshinkova
July 15	Baja, Hungary; Clay; W25; Singles and Doubles Draws	(Austria) Melanie Klaffner (Egypt) Mayar Sherif; 6–2, 4–6, [10–8]	(Hungary) Réka Luca Jani (Belgium) Lara Salden	(Hungary) Dalma Gálfi (Belgium) Lara Salden	(Slovakia) Vivien Juhászová (Croatia) Tena Lukas (Serbia) Dejana Radanović (Bulgaria) Petia Arshinkova
July 15	Imola, Italy; Carpet; W25; Singles and Doubles Draws	(Italy) Stefania Rubini; 6–3, 6–3	(Italy) Claudia Giovine	(Italy) Camilla Rosatello (Italy) Verena Meliss	(Italy) Corinna Dentoni (Switzerland) Nina Stadler (Greece) Eleni Kordolaimi (Italy) Angelica Moratelli
July 15	Imola, Italy; Carpet; W25; Singles and Doubles Draws	(Brazil) Paula Cristina Gonçalves (Switzerland) Nina Stadler; 6–4, 6–2	(United States) Rasheeda McAdoo (Egypt) Sandra Samir	(Italy) Camilla Rosatello (Italy) Verena Meliss	(Italy) Corinna Dentoni (Switzerland) Nina Stadler (Greece) Eleni Kordolaimi (Italy) Angelica Moratelli
July 15	Palmela, Portugal; Hard; W25; Singles and Doubles Draws	(Spain) Guiomar Maristany; 6–3, 7–5	(Spain) Eva Guerrero Álvarez	(Belarus) Yuliya Hatouka (France) Julie Gervais	(Serbia) Tamara Čurović (United Kingdom) Eden Silva (Bulgaria) Julia Terziyska (United Kingdom) Maia Lumsden
July 15	Palmela, Portugal; Hard; W25; Singles and Doubles Draws	(United Kingdom) Sarah Beth Grey (United Kingdom) Eden Silva; 7–5, 6–2	(France) Estelle Cascino (Bulgaria) Julia Terziyska	(Belarus) Yuliya Hatouka (France) Julie Gervais	(Serbia) Tamara Čurović (United Kingdom) Eden Silva (Bulgaria) Julia Terziyska (United Kingdom) Maia Lumsden
July 15	Pärnu, Estonia; Clay; W15; Singles and Doubles Draws	(Netherlands) Suzan Lamens; 6–4, 6–0	(Estonia) Elena Malõgina	(Estonia) Lissi Kubre (Canada) Maria Tanasescu	(Switzerland) Fiona Ganz (Denmark) Karen Barritza (Russia) Ekaterina Reyngold (Sweden) Fanny Östlund
July 15	Pärnu, Estonia; Clay; W15; Singles and Doubles Draws	(Finland) Anastasia Kulikova (Estonia) Elena Malõgina; 6–3, 2–6, [10–5]	(Estonia) Saara Orav (Estonia) Katriin Saar	(Estonia) Lissi Kubre (Canada) Maria Tanasescu	(Switzerland) Fiona Ganz (Denmark) Karen Barritza (Russia) Ekaterina Reyngold (Sweden) Fanny Östlund
July 15	Dijon, France; Hard; W15; Singles and Doubles Draws	(France) Mathilde Armitano; 6–1, 6–3	(Sweden) Susanne Celik	(Colombia) María Herazo González (France) Alice Robbe	(France) Mylène Halemai (France) Marie Villet (Belgium) Victoria Kalaitzis (France) Diana Martynov
July 15	Dijon, France; Hard; W15; Singles and Doubles Draws	(France) Mylène Halemai (France) Laïa Petretic; 6–4, 6–4	(Belgium) Victoria Kalaitzis (Belgium) Justine Pysson	(Colombia) María Herazo González (France) Alice Robbe	(France) Mylène Halemai (France) Marie Villet (Belgium) Victoria Kalaitzis (France) Diana Martynov
July 15	Cancún, Mexico; Hard; W15; Singles and Doubles Draws	(United States) Adriana Reami; 7–6^{(7–2)}, 7–6^{(7–5)}	(Brazil) Thaisa Grana Pedretti	(Israel) Lina Glushko (France) Tiphanie Fiquet	(United States) Anna Sinclair Rogers (Brazil) Eduarda Piai (Israel) Nicole Nadel (Lithuania) Justina Mikulskytė
July 15	Cancún, Mexico; Hard; W15; Singles and Doubles Draws	(United States) Adriana Reami (United States) Anna Sinclair Rogers; 7–6^{(7–1)}, 6–4	(France) Tiphanie Fiquet (Lithuania) Justina Mikulskytė	(Israel) Lina Glushko (France) Tiphanie Fiquet	(United States) Anna Sinclair Rogers (Brazil) Eduarda Piai (Israel) Nicole Nadel (Lithuania) Justina Mikulskytė
July 15	Lima, Peru; Clay; W15; Singles and Doubles Draws	(Bolivia) Noelia Zeballos; 6–3, 6–1	(Venezuela) Nadia Echeverría Alam	(Chile) Fernanda Brito (Canada) Bianca Fernandez	(United States) Akilah James (Canada) Raphaëlle Lacasse (Peru) Romina Ccuno (Ecuador) Camila Romero
July 15	Lima, Peru; Clay; W15; Singles and Doubles Draws	(Chile) Fernanda Labraña (Ecuador) Camila Romero; 6–2, 6–4	(Venezuela) Nadia Echeverría Alam (Romania) Diana Maria Mihail	(Chile) Fernanda Brito (Canada) Bianca Fernandez	(United States) Akilah James (Canada) Raphaëlle Lacasse (Peru) Romina Ccuno (Ecuador) Camila Romero
July 15	Don Benito, Spain; Carpet; W15; Singles and Doubles Draws	(Russia) Ekaterina Shalimova; 6–1, 6–1	(Spain) María José Luque Moreno	(United Kingdom) Emilie Lindh (Spain) Ángeles Moreno Barranquero	(Czech Republic) Karolína Beránková (Republic of Ireland) Georgia Drummy (Spain) Celia Cerviño Ruiz (Spain) Olga Parres Azcoitia
July 15	Don Benito, Spain; Carpet; W15; Singles and Doubles Draws	(Spain) Alba Carrillo Marín (United Kingdom) Emilie Lindh; 6–4, 7–5	(Czech Republic) Karolína Beránková (Republic of Ireland) Georgia Drummy	(United Kingdom) Emilie Lindh (Spain) Ángeles Moreno Barranquero	(Czech Republic) Karolína Beránková (Republic of Ireland) Georgia Drummy (Spain) Celia Cerviño Ruiz (Spain) Olga Parres Azcoitia
July 15	Tabarka, Tunisia; Clay; W15; Singles and Doubles Draws	(Italy) Federica Arcidiacono; 3–6, 6–1, 6–3	(Spain) Paula Arias Manjón	(Germany) Julyette Steur (France) Olympe Lancelot	(Italy) Nuria Brancaccio (France) Maëlys Bougrat (Italy) Alice Amendola (France) Agathe Timsit
July 15	Tabarka, Tunisia; Clay; W15; Singles and Doubles Draws	(Italy) Federica Arcidiacono (Italy) Nuria Brancaccio; 6–4, 4–6, [10–6]	(Spain) Paula Arias Manjón (Germany) Julyette Steur	(Germany) Julyette Steur (France) Olympe Lancelot	(Italy) Nuria Brancaccio (France) Maëlys Bougrat (Italy) Alice Amendola (France) Agathe Timsit
July 22	Challenger de Granby; Granby, Canada; Hard; W80; Singles Draw – Doubles Draw	(Australia) Lizette Cabrera; 6–1, 6–4	(Canada) Leylah Annie Fernandez	(Canada) Françoise Abanda (Canada) Katherine Sebov	(Australia) Maddison Inglis (Japan) Mayo Hibi (United States) Francesca Di Lorenzo (Canada) Layne Sleeth
July 22	Challenger de Granby; Granby, Canada; Hard; W80; Singles Draw – Doubles Draw	(Japan) Haruka Kaji (Japan) Junri Namigata; 7–6^{(7–5)}, 5–7, [10–8]	(United States) Quinn Gleason (United States) Ingrid Neel	(Canada) Françoise Abanda (Canada) Katherine Sebov	(Australia) Maddison Inglis (Japan) Mayo Hibi (United States) Francesca Di Lorenzo (Canada) Layne Sleeth
July 22	Advantage Cars Prague Open; Prague, Czech Republic; Clay; W60; Singles Draw – Doubles Draw	(Germany) Tamara Korpatsch; 7–5, 6–3	(Czech Republic) Denisa Allertová	(Netherlands) Richèl Hogenkamp (Czech Republic) Anastasia Zarycká	(Bulgaria) Viktoriya Tomova (Cyprus) Raluca Șerban (Paraguay) Verónica Cepede Royg (Czech Republic) Tereza Martincová
July 22	Advantage Cars Prague Open; Prague, Czech Republic; Clay; W60; Singles Draw – Doubles Draw	(Romania) Nicoleta Dascălu (Cyprus) Raluca Șerban; 6–4, 6–4	(Czech Republic) Lucie Hradecká (Czech Republic) Johana Marková	(Netherlands) Richèl Hogenkamp (Czech Republic) Anastasia Zarycká	(Bulgaria) Viktoriya Tomova (Cyprus) Raluca Șerban (Paraguay) Verónica Cepede Royg (Czech Republic) Tereza Martincová
July 22	Braidy Industries Women's Tennis Classic; Ashland, United States; Hard; W60; Singles Draw – Doubles Draw	(Australia) Ellen Perez; 6–2, 3–2, ret.	(Australia) Zoe Hives	(United Kingdom) Katie Swan (United States) Robin Anderson	(United States) Maegan Manasse (United States) Ann Li (United States) Hanna Chang (United States) Alexa Glatch
July 22	Braidy Industries Women's Tennis Classic; Ashland, United States; Hard; W60; Singles Draw – Doubles Draw	(United States) Sanaz Marand (United States) Caitlin Whoriskey; 7–6^{(7–4)}, 6–4	(Montenegro) Vladica Babić (Sweden) Julia Rosenqvist	(United Kingdom) Katie Swan (United States) Robin Anderson	(United States) Maegan Manasse (United States) Ann Li (United States) Hanna Chang (United States) Alexa Glatch
July 22	Horb, Germany; Clay; W25; Singles and Doubles Draws	(Croatia) Lea Bošković; 6–4, 0–6, 6–1	(Switzerland) Simona Waltert	(Luxembourg) Eléonora Molinaro (Romania) Oana Georgeta Simion	(Norway) Melanie Stokke (Romania) Irina Fetecău (France) Alice Tubello (Germany) Romy Kölzer
July 22	Horb, Germany; Clay; W25; Singles and Doubles Draws	(Germany) Katharina Gerlach (Germany) Julia Wachaczyk; 6–1, 6–3	(Uzbekistan) Albina Khabibulina (Georgia (country)) Sofia Shapatava	(Luxembourg) Eléonora Molinaro (Romania) Oana Georgeta Simion	(Norway) Melanie Stokke (Romania) Irina Fetecău (France) Alice Tubello (Germany) Romy Kölzer
July 22	Bytom, Poland; Clay; W25; Singles and Doubles Draws	(Poland) Maja Chwalińska; 6–3, 6–4	(Slovenia) Nina Potočnik	(Poland) Katarzyna Piter (Russia) Daria Lodikova	(Hungary) Dalma Gálfi (Turkey) İpek Soylu (Japan) Chihiro Muramatsu (Italy) Martina Caregaro
July 22	Bytom, Poland; Clay; W25; Singles and Doubles Draws	(Hungary) Dalma Gálfi (Poland) Katarzyna Piter; 6–4, 6–0	(Ukraine) Maryna Chernyshova (Russia) Daria Lodikova	(Poland) Katarzyna Piter (Russia) Daria Lodikova	(Hungary) Dalma Gálfi (Turkey) İpek Soylu (Japan) Chihiro Muramatsu (Italy) Martina Caregaro
July 22	Porto, Portugal; Hard; W25; Singles and Doubles Draws	(Spain) Eva Guerrero Álvarez; 6–4, 6–7^{(4–7)}, 6–3	(France) Myrtille Georges	(Japan) Mari Osaka (Spain) Guiomar Maristany	(Turkey) Pemra Özgen (France) Estelle Cascino (Portugal) Inês Murta (United Kingdom) Eden Silva
July 22	Porto, Portugal; Hard; W25; Singles and Doubles Draws	(France) Estelle Cascino (Bulgaria) Julia Terziyska; 7–6^{(7–0)}, 6–3	(Sweden) Jacqueline Cabaj Awad (Portugal) Inês Murta	(Japan) Mari Osaka (Spain) Guiomar Maristany	(Turkey) Pemra Özgen (France) Estelle Cascino (Portugal) Inês Murta (United Kingdom) Eden Silva
July 22	Moscow, Russia; Clay; W25; Singles and Doubles Draws	(Russia) Victoria Kan; 6–1, 7–6^{(7–2)}	(Russia) Vlada Koval	(Ukraine) Ganna Poznikhirenko (Russia) Maria Shusharina	(Serbia) Draginja Vuković (Russia) Alina Shcherbinina (Ukraine) Valeriya Strakhova (Russia) Anastasiya Komardina
July 22	Moscow, Russia; Clay; W25; Singles and Doubles Draws	(Russia) Amina Anshba (Czech Republic) Anastasia Dețiuc; 6–2, 6–4	(Belarus) Ilona Kremen (Russia) Ekaterina Makarova	(Ukraine) Ganna Poznikhirenko (Russia) Maria Shusharina	(Serbia) Draginja Vuković (Russia) Alina Shcherbinina (Ukraine) Valeriya Strakhova (Russia) Anastasiya Komardina
July 22	Vitoria-Gasteiz, Spain; Hard; W25; Singles and Doubles Draws	(Spain) Cristina Bucșa; 6–0, 6–4	(Belarus) Shalimar Talbi	(Romania) Ioana Loredana Roșca (Russia) Daria Mishina	(Spain) Andrea Lázaro García (Australia) Alexandra Bozovic (Spain) Alba Carrillo Marín (Mexico) Victoria Rodríguez
July 22	Vitoria-Gasteiz, Spain; Hard; W25; Singles and Doubles Draws	(Mexico) Victoria Rodríguez (Mexico) Ana Sofía Sánchez; 6–3, 6–3	(Spain) Alba Carrillo Marín (Spain) Ángela Fita Boluda	(Romania) Ioana Loredana Roșca (Russia) Daria Mishina	(Spain) Andrea Lázaro García (Australia) Alexandra Bozovic (Spain) Alba Carrillo Marín (Mexico) Victoria Rodríguez
July 22	Nonthaburi, Thailand; Hard; W25; Singles and Doubles Draws	(South Korea) Jang Su-jeong; 6–1, 2–6, 6–4	(China) Xun Fangying	(Japan) Yuki Naito (China) Wang Xinyu	(China) Kang Jiaqi (China) Lu Jiajing (Indonesia) Aldila Sutjiadi (Uzbekistan) Sabina Sharipova
July 22	Nonthaburi, Thailand; Hard; W25; Singles and Doubles Draws	(Hong Kong) Eudice Chong (Indonesia) Aldila Sutjiadi; 7–6^{(7–2)}, 6–4	(Japan) Akiko Omae (Thailand) Peangtarn Plipuech	(Japan) Yuki Naito (China) Wang Xinyu	(China) Kang Jiaqi (China) Lu Jiajing (Indonesia) Aldila Sutjiadi (Uzbekistan) Sabina Sharipova
July 22	Evansville, United States; Hard; W25; Singles and Doubles Draws	(United States) Grace Min; 7–6^{(9–7)}, 4–6, 7–5	(Israel) Deniz Khazaniuk	(United States) Natasha Subhash (Japan) Haruna Arakawa	(United States) Katharine Fahey (Mexico) Fernanda Contreras (South Africa) Chanel Simmonds (United States) Elizabeth Mandlik
July 22	Evansville, United States; Hard; W25; Singles and Doubles Draws	(Chinese Taipei) Hsu Chieh-yu (South Africa) Chanel Simmonds; 6–2, 6–0	(Japan) Haruna Arakawa (United States) Pamela Montez	(United States) Natasha Subhash (Japan) Haruna Arakawa	(United States) Katharine Fahey (Mexico) Fernanda Contreras (South Africa) Chanel Simmonds (United States) Elizabeth Mandlik
July 22	Tampere Open; Tampere, Finland; Hard (indoor); W15; Singles and Doubles Draws	(Finland) Anastasia Kulikova; 6–4, 6–7^{(2–7)}, 6–3	(Belgium) Victoria Kalaitzis	(Russia) Polina Bakhmutkina (Latvia) Margarita Ignatjeva	(Estonia) Katriin Saar (Russia) Evgeniya Levashova (Lithuania) Iveta Dapkutė (Denmark) Sofia Samavati
July 22	Tampere Open; Tampere, Finland; Hard (indoor); W15; Singles and Doubles Draws	(Russia) Polina Bakhmutkina (Russia) Noel Saidenova; 6–2, 6–3	(Australia) Isabella Bozicevic (Finland) Anastasia Kulikova	(Russia) Polina Bakhmutkina (Latvia) Margarita Ignatjeva	(Estonia) Katriin Saar (Russia) Evgeniya Levashova (Lithuania) Iveta Dapkutė (Denmark) Sofia Samavati
July 22	Les Contamines-Montjoie, France; Hard; W15; Singles and Doubles Draws	(Switzerland) Joanne Züger; 7–6^{(7–2)}, 6–0	(France) Célia-Belle Mohr	(France) Lucie Wargnier (France) Mathilde Armitano	(Argentina) Agustina Chlpac (Sweden) Susanne Celik (France) Sophia Biolay (Czech Republic) Nikola Břečková
July 22	Les Contamines-Montjoie, France; Hard; W15; Singles and Doubles Draws	(France) Aubane Droguet (France) Margaux Rouvroy; 7–5, 6–3	(France) Rania Azziz (France) Mathilde Dury	(France) Lucie Wargnier (France) Mathilde Armitano	(Argentina) Agustina Chlpac (Sweden) Susanne Celik (France) Sophia Biolay (Czech Republic) Nikola Břečková
July 22	Schio, Italy; Clay; W15; Singles and Doubles Draws	(Colombia) Yuliana Lizarazo; 6–4, 7–5	(Slovenia) Manca Pislak	(Italy) Camilla Scala (Italy) Bianca Turati	(Italy) Angelica Raggi (Italy) Lisa Pigato (Italy) Sara Gambogi (Italy) Martina Spigarelli
July 22	Schio, Italy; Clay; W15; Singles and Doubles Draws	(Colombia) Yuliana Lizarazo (Italy) Aurora Zantedeschi; 6–3, 1–6, [10–5]	(Italy) Matilde Paoletti (Italy) Lisa Pigato	(Italy) Camilla Scala (Italy) Bianca Turati	(Italy) Angelica Raggi (Italy) Lisa Pigato (Italy) Sara Gambogi (Italy) Martina Spigarelli
July 22	Cancún, Mexico; Hard; W15; Singles and Doubles Draws	(Brazil) Thaisa Grana Pedretti; 6–2, 6–3	(United States) Elle Christensen	(Israel) Kristin Younes (Japan) Mayuka Aikawa	(United States) Madison Appel (United States) Jwany Sherif (Japan) Aiko Yoshitomi (Russia) Anastasia Sysoeva
July 22	Cancún, Mexico; Hard; W15; Singles and Doubles Draws	(Brazil) Thaisa Grana Pedretti (Mexico) María José Portillo Ramírez; 7–5, 6–3	(Netherlands) Dewi Dijkman (Netherlands) Isabelle Haverlag	(Israel) Kristin Younes (Japan) Mayuka Aikawa	(United States) Madison Appel (United States) Jwany Sherif (Japan) Aiko Yoshitomi (Russia) Anastasia Sysoeva
July 22	Sandefjord, Norway; Clay; W15; Singles and Doubles Draws	(Czech Republic) Michaela Bayerlová; 5–7, 6–3, 6–3	(Norway) Malene Helgø	(Netherlands) Suzan Lamens (Norway) Astrid Wanja Brune Olsen	(Denmark) Clara Tauson (Germany) Lisa Ponomar (Hungary) Réka Fárbás (Sweden) Ida Jarlskog
July 22	Sandefjord, Norway; Clay; W15; Singles and Doubles Draws	(Norway) Astrid Wanja Brune Olsen (Norway) Malene Helgø; 6–3, 6–3	(Netherlands) Suzan Lamens (Netherlands) Annick Melgers	(Netherlands) Suzan Lamens (Norway) Astrid Wanja Brune Olsen	(Denmark) Clara Tauson (Germany) Lisa Ponomar (Hungary) Réka Fárbás (Sweden) Ida Jarlskog
July 22	Tabarka, Tunisia; Clay; W15; Singles and Doubles Draws	(Netherlands) Eva Vedder; 7–5, 6–3	(France) Maëlys Bougrat	(Italy) Nuria Brancaccio (Spain) Paula Arias Manjón	(Italy) Alice Amendola (Italy) Federica Arcidiacono (United Kingdom) Anna Popescu (Russia) Daria Kudashova
July 22	Tabarka, Tunisia; Clay; W15; Singles and Doubles Draws	(Netherlands) Eva Vedder (Netherlands) Stéphanie Visscher; 2–6, 6–2, [10–5]	(Bulgaria) Elizabeth Danailova (Belgium) Chelsea Vanhoutte	(Italy) Nuria Brancaccio (Spain) Paula Arias Manjón	(Italy) Alice Amendola (Italy) Federica Arcidiacono (United Kingdom) Anna Popescu (Russia) Daria Kudashova
July 29	Lexington Challenger; Lexington, United States; Hard; W60; Singles Draw – Doubles Draw	(South Korea) Kim Da-bin; 6–1, 6–3	(United States) Ann Li	(South Korea) Han Na-lae (United States) Robin Anderson	(United Kingdom) Katie Swan (Australia) Zoe Hives (Israel) Deniz Khazaniuk (United States) Jamie Loeb
July 29	Lexington Challenger; Lexington, United States; Hard; W60; Singles Draw – Doubles Draw	(United States) Robin Anderson (France) Jessika Ponchet; 7–6^{(7–4)}, 6–7^{(5–7)}, [10–7]	(United States) Ann Li (United States) Jamie Loeb	(South Korea) Han Na-lae (United States) Robin Anderson	(United Kingdom) Katie Swan (Australia) Zoe Hives (Israel) Deniz Khazaniuk (United States) Jamie Loeb
July 29	Bad Saulgau, Germany; Clay; W25+H; Singles and Doubles Draws	(Spain) Sara Sorribes Tormo; 7–6^{(7–4)}, 6–1	(Germany) Katharina Gerlach	(Romania) Irina Fetecău (Norway) Melanie Stokke	(Russia) Marina Melnikova (Brazil) Gabriela Cé (Brazil) Teliana Pereira (Spain) Georgina García Pérez
July 29	Bad Saulgau, Germany; Clay; W25+H; Singles and Doubles Draws	(Spain) Georgina García Pérez (Spain) Sara Sorribes Tormo; 6–3, 6–1	(Russia) Ksenia Laskutova (Russia) Marina Melnikova	(Romania) Irina Fetecău (Norway) Melanie Stokke	(Russia) Marina Melnikova (Brazil) Gabriela Cé (Brazil) Teliana Pereira (Spain) Georgina García Pérez
July 29	Sezze, Italy; Clay; W25; Singles and Doubles Draws	(Italy) Stefania Rubini; 6–4, 6–1	(Kazakhstan) Anna Danilina	(Italy) Jessica Pieri (Russia) Maria Marfutina	(United Kingdom) Francesca Jones (Russia) Victoria Kan (Romania) Ilona Georgiana Ghioroaie (Italy) Camilla Rosatello
July 29	Sezze, Italy; Clay; W25; Singles and Doubles Draws	(Kazakhstan) Anna Danilina (Russia) Ekaterina Yashina; 7–5, 6–4	(Italy) Nuria Brancaccio (Italy) Federica Sacco	(Italy) Jessica Pieri (Russia) Maria Marfutina	(United Kingdom) Francesca Jones (Russia) Victoria Kan (Romania) Ilona Georgiana Ghioroaie (Italy) Camilla Rosatello
July 29	Grodzisk Mazowiecki, Poland; Clay; W25; Singles and Doubles Draws	(Poland) Maja Chwalińska; 7–6^{(7–5)}, 6–4	(Serbia) Dejana Radanović	(France) Tessah Andrianjafitrimo (Poland) Katarzyna Piter	(Poland) Anna Hertel (Ukraine) Valeriya Strakhova (Slovakia) Vivien Juhászová (Norway) Ulrikke Eikeri
July 29	Grodzisk Mazowiecki, Poland; Clay; W25; Singles and Doubles Draws	(Poland) Anna Hertel (Ukraine) Anastasiya Shoshyna; 6–7^{(6–8)}, 6–2, [10–4]	(Norway) Ulrikke Eikeri (Bulgaria) Isabella Shinikova	(France) Tessah Andrianjafitrimo (Poland) Katarzyna Piter	(Poland) Anna Hertel (Ukraine) Valeriya Strakhova (Slovakia) Vivien Juhászová (Norway) Ulrikke Eikeri
July 29	Open Castilla y León; El Espinar, Spain; Hard; W25; Singles and Doubles Draws	(Netherlands) Arantxa Rus; 6–4, 6–1	(Bulgaria) Julia Terziyska	(Spain) Eva Guerrero Álvarez (Bulgaria) Elitsa Kostova	(Spain) Alba Carrillo Marín (Spain) Olga Parres Azcoitia (Ukraine) Olga Ianchuk (Spain) Cristina Bucșa
July 29	Open Castilla y León; El Espinar, Spain; Hard; W25; Singles and Doubles Draws	(Spain) Marina Bassols Ribera (China) Feng Shuo; 7–5, 7–6^{(7–4)}	(Australia) Alexandra Bozovic (Belarus) Shalimar Talbi	(Spain) Eva Guerrero Álvarez (Bulgaria) Elitsa Kostova	(Spain) Alba Carrillo Marín (Spain) Olga Parres Azcoitia (Ukraine) Olga Ianchuk (Spain) Cristina Bucșa
July 29	Taipei, Taiwan; Hard; W25; Singles and Doubles Draws	(Russia) Valeria Savinykh; 7–5, 6–2	(Japan) Risa Ushijima	(South Korea) Park So-hyun (China) Zhang Ying	(Japan) Lisa-Marie Rioux (Thailand) Nudnida Luangnam (Japan) Mai Minokoshi (Chinese Taipei) Hsu Ching-wen
July 29	Taipei, Taiwan; Hard; W25; Singles and Doubles Draws	(India) Riya Bhatia (Japan) Ramu Ueda; 7–5, 6–2	(Chinese Taipei) Cho I-hsuan (Chinese Taipei) Cho Yi-tsen	(South Korea) Park So-hyun (China) Zhang Ying	(Japan) Lisa-Marie Rioux (Thailand) Nudnida Luangnam (Japan) Mai Minokoshi (Chinese Taipei) Hsu Ching-wen
July 29	Nonthaburi, Thailand; Hard; W25; Singles and Doubles Draws	(Japan) Yuki Naito; 2–6, 7–6^{(7–4)}, 6–3	(China) Wang Xinyu	(Uzbekistan) Sabina Sharipova (Thailand) Mananchaya Sawangkaew	(Thailand) Peangtarn Plipuech (Japan) Michika Ozeki (Kazakhstan) Gozal Ainitdinova (India) Rutuja Bhosale
July 29	Nonthaburi, Thailand; Hard; W25; Singles and Doubles Draws	(Hong Kong) Eudice Chong (Indonesia) Aldila Sutjiadi; 6–2, 6–1	(Japan) Erika Sema (China) Wu Meixu	(Uzbekistan) Sabina Sharipova (Thailand) Mananchaya Sawangkaew	(Thailand) Peangtarn Plipuech (Japan) Michika Ozeki (Kazakhstan) Gozal Ainitdinova (India) Rutuja Bhosale
July 29	GB Pro-Series Foxhills; Woking, United Kingdom; Hard; W25; Singles and Doubles Draws	(Netherlands) Lesley Kerkhove; 7–6^{(8–6)}, 6–2	(Turkey) Pemra Özgen	(France) Myrtille Georges (France) Océane Dodin	(United Kingdom) Sarah Beth Grey (India) Ankita Raina (Germany) Vivian Heisen (France) Estelle Cascino
July 29	GB Pro-Series Foxhills; Woking, United Kingdom; Hard; W25; Singles and Doubles Draws	(United Kingdom) Sarah Beth Grey (United Kingdom) Eden Silva; 6–2, 7–5	(United Kingdom) Naiktha Bains (India) Ankita Raina	(France) Myrtille Georges (France) Océane Dodin	(United Kingdom) Sarah Beth Grey (India) Ankita Raina (Germany) Vivian Heisen (France) Estelle Cascino
July 29	Fort Worth, United States; Hard; W25; Singles and Doubles Draws	(United States) Catherine Harrison; 6–4, 6–0	(United States) Chanelle Van Nguyen	(United States) Lorraine Guillermo (United States) Alexa Glatch	(United States) Sophia Whittle (United States) Lauren Proctor (Australia) Olivia Tjandramulia (Japan) Nagi Hanatani
July 29	Fort Worth, United States; Hard; W25; Singles and Doubles Draws	(Chinese Taipei) Hsu Chieh-yu (Romania) Gabriela Talabă; 7–6^{(10–8)}, 7–5	(United States) Elysia Bolton (United States) Jada Hart	(United States) Lorraine Guillermo (United States) Alexa Glatch	(United States) Sophia Whittle (United States) Lauren Proctor (Australia) Olivia Tjandramulia (Japan) Nagi Hanatani
July 29	Knokke, Belgium; Clay; W15; Singles and Doubles Draws	(Netherlands) Cindy Burger; 7–6^{(7–5)}, 3–6, 6–1	(Russia) Anastasia Pribylova	(Japan) Yukina Saigo (France) Salma Djoubri	(Sweden) Marina Yudanov (Netherlands) Suzan Lamens (Germany) Katharina Hering (Germany) Julia Kimmelmann
July 29	Knokke, Belgium; Clay; W15; Singles and Doubles Draws	(Argentina) Melany Krywoj (Belgium) Chelsea Vanhoutte; 6–3, 2–6, [12–10]	(Russia) Anastasia Pribylova (Russia) Anna Pribylova	(Japan) Yukina Saigo (France) Salma Djoubri	(Sweden) Marina Yudanov (Netherlands) Suzan Lamens (Germany) Katharina Hering (Germany) Julia Kimmelmann
July 29	Savitaipale, Finland; Clay; W15; Singles and Doubles Draws	(Finland) Anastasia Kulikova; 4–6, 7–6^{(7–3)}, 6–2	(Russia) Ekaterina Kazionova	(Russia) Polina Bakhmutkina (Russia) Noel Saidenova	(Estonia) Elena Malõgina (Sweden) Louise Brunskog (Finland) Laura Hietaranta (Denmark) Sofia Samavati
July 29	Savitaipale, Finland; Clay; W15; Singles and Doubles Draws	(Russia) Eva Garkusha (Russia) Ekaterina Kazionova; 6–2, 6–3	(Russia) Anna Makhorkina (Belarus) Sadafmoh Tolibova	(Russia) Polina Bakhmutkina (Russia) Noel Saidenova	(Estonia) Elena Malõgina (Sweden) Louise Brunskog (Finland) Laura Hietaranta (Denmark) Sofia Samavati
July 29	Dublin, Ireland; Carpet; W15; Singles and Doubles Draws	(Republic of Ireland) Georgia Drummy; 6–1, 6–2	(France) Alice Robbe	(Republic of Ireland) Anna Bowtell (Czech Republic) Karolína Beránková	(Estonia) Helena Narmont (Germany) Lisa Ponomar (Sweden) Ida Jarlskog (France) Sophia Biolay
July 29	Dublin, Ireland; Carpet; W15; Singles and Doubles Draws	(Romania) Karola Patricia Bejenaru (Germany) Lisa Ponomar; 6–0, 6–4	(Czech Republic) Karolína Beránková (Republic of Ireland) Georgia Drummy	(Republic of Ireland) Anna Bowtell (Czech Republic) Karolína Beránková	(Estonia) Helena Narmont (Germany) Lisa Ponomar (Sweden) Ida Jarlskog (France) Sophia Biolay
July 29	Cancún, Mexico; Hard; W15; Singles and Doubles Draws	(Brazil) Thaisa Grana Pedretti; 6–4, 2–0, ret.	(Russia) Anna Morgina	(Japan) Mayuka Aikawa (Russia) Anzhelika Isaeva	(Netherlands) Lian Tran (Japan) Michiru Furuya (United States) Elle Christensen (Mexico) María José Portillo Ramírez
July 29	Cancún, Mexico; Hard; W15; Singles and Doubles Draws	(Brazil) Thaisa Grana Pedretti (Mexico) María José Portillo Ramírez; 6–4, 6–4	(Japan) Haine Ogata (Japan) Aiko Yoshitomi	(Japan) Mayuka Aikawa (Russia) Anzhelika Isaeva	(Netherlands) Lian Tran (Japan) Michiru Furuya (United States) Elle Christensen (Mexico) María José Portillo Ramírez
July 29	Tabarka, Tunisia; Clay; W15; Singles and Doubles Draws	(Italy) Anna Turati; 6–0, 6–3	(Russia) Daria Kudashova	(France) Jade Suvrijn (Netherlands) Eva Vedder	(Belarus) Katyarina Paulenka (Romania) Oana Gavrilă (Spain) Ana Lantigua de la Nuez (Netherlands) Stéphanie Visscher
July 29	Tabarka, Tunisia; Clay; W15; Singles and Doubles Draws	(Netherlands) Eva Vedder (Netherlands) Stéphanie Visscher; 6–2, 6–2	(India) Sowjanya Bavisetti (India) Sravya Shivani Chilakalapudi	(France) Jade Suvrijn (Netherlands) Eva Vedder	(Belarus) Katyarina Paulenka (Romania) Oana Gavrilă (Spain) Ana Lantigua de la Nuez (Netherlands) Stéphanie Visscher

=== August ===
Week of	Tournament	Winner	Runners-up	Semifinalists	Quarterfinalists
August 5	Ladies Open Hechingen; Hechingen, Germany; Clay; W60; Singles Draw – Doubles Draw	(Austria) Barbara Haas; 6–2, 6–1	(Serbia) Olga Danilović	(Russia) Marina Melnikova (Croatia) Lea Bošković	(Germany) Tamara Korpatsch (Romania) Laura Ioana Paar (Germany) Laura Schaeder (Spain) Georgina García Pérez
August 5	Ladies Open Hechingen; Hechingen, Germany; Clay; W60; Singles Draw – Doubles Draw	(Romania) Cristina Dinu (North Macedonia) Lina Gjorcheska; 4–6, 7–5, [10–7]	(Serbia) Olga Danilović (Spain) Georgina García Pérez	(Russia) Marina Melnikova (Croatia) Lea Bošković	(Germany) Tamara Korpatsch (Romania) Laura Ioana Paar (Germany) Laura Schaeder (Spain) Georgina García Pérez
August 5	WSG Open; Warsaw, Poland; Clay; W60; Singles Draw – Doubles Draw	(Poland) Maja Chwalińska; 6–3, 6–0	(Russia) Anastasiya Komardina	(China) Yuan Yue (Russia) Victoria Kan	(Czech Republic) Anastasia Dețiuc (Italy) Deborah Chiesa (France) Tessah Andrianjafitrimo (Georgia (country)) Ekaterine Gorgodze
August 5	WSG Open; Warsaw, Poland; Clay; W60; Singles Draw – Doubles Draw	(Poland) Maja Chwalińska (Norway) Ulrikke Eikeri; 6–4, 6–1	(Poland) Weronika Falkowska (Poland) Martyna Kubka	(China) Yuan Yue (Russia) Victoria Kan	(Czech Republic) Anastasia Dețiuc (Italy) Deborah Chiesa (France) Tessah Andrianjafitrimo (Georgia (country)) Ekaterine Gorgodze
August 5	Koser Jewelers Tennis Challenge; Landisville, United States; Hard; W60; Singles Draw – Doubles Draw	(United States) Madison Brengle; 6–4, 7–5	(China) Zhu Lin	(United States) Victoria Duval (United States) Sophia Whittle	(Chinese Taipei) Liang En-shuo (Argentina) Paula Ormaechea (Ukraine) Katarina Zavatska (Belgium) Yanina Wickmayer
August 5	Koser Jewelers Tennis Challenge; Landisville, United States; Hard; W60; Singles Draw – Doubles Draw	(United States) Vania King (United States) Claire Liu; 4–6, 6–2, [10–5]	(United States) Hayley Carter (United States) Jamie Loeb	(United States) Victoria Duval (United States) Sophia Whittle	(Chinese Taipei) Liang En-shuo (Argentina) Paula Ormaechea (Ukraine) Katarina Zavatska (Belgium) Yanina Wickmayer
August 5	Koksijde, Belgium; Clay; W25; Singles and Doubles Draws	(Netherlands) Richèl Hogenkamp; 4–6, 6–1, 6–4	(France) Océane Dodin	(Belgium) Lara Salden (Belgium) Magali Kempen	(Luxembourg) Eléonora Molinaro (France) Marie Témin (France) Lucie Wargnier (Netherlands) Stéphanie Visscher
August 5	Koksijde, Belgium; Clay; W25; Singles and Doubles Draws	(Belgium) Lara Salden (Belgium) Kimberley Zimmermann; 6–1, 6–7^{(3–7)}, [11–9]	(Netherlands) Suzan Lamens (Russia) Anna Pribylova	(Belgium) Lara Salden (Belgium) Magali Kempen	(Luxembourg) Eléonora Molinaro (France) Marie Témin (France) Lucie Wargnier (Netherlands) Stéphanie Visscher
August 5	Internazionali del Friuli Venezia Giulia; Cordenons, Italy; Clay; W25; Singles and Doubles Draws	(Netherlands) Arantxa Rus; 4–6, 6–4, 6–1	(Slovenia) Nika Radišič	(Italy) Angelica Moratelli (Italy) Camilla Scala	(Italy) Bianca Turati (Slovenia) Manca Pislak (Italy) Jessica Pieri (Romania) Ilona Georgiana Ghioroaie
August 5	Internazionali del Friuli Venezia Giulia; Cordenons, Italy; Clay; W25; Singles and Doubles Draws	(Slovenia) Veronika Erjavec (Slovenia) Nika Radišič; 6–3, 7–5	(Italy) Martina Caregaro (Switzerland) Lisa Sabino	(Italy) Angelica Moratelli (Italy) Camilla Scala	(Italy) Bianca Turati (Slovenia) Manca Pislak (Italy) Jessica Pieri (Romania) Ilona Georgiana Ghioroaie
August 5	Las Palmas, Spain; Clay; W25+H; Singles and Doubles Draws	(Egypt) Mayar Sherif; 6–1, 6–0	(Switzerland) Leonie Küng	(Algeria) Inès Ibbou (France) Amandine Hesse	(Germany) Sarah-Rebecca Sekulic (Greece) Despina Papamichail (Spain) Júlia Payola (Spain) Rosa Vicens Mas
August 5	Las Palmas, Spain; Clay; W25+H; Singles and Doubles Draws	(Mexico) Victoria Rodríguez (Mexico) Ana Sofía Sánchez; 6–3, 7–5	(Spain) Marina Bassols Ribera (China) Feng Shuo	(Algeria) Inès Ibbou (France) Amandine Hesse	(Germany) Sarah-Rebecca Sekulic (Greece) Despina Papamichail (Spain) Júlia Payola (Spain) Rosa Vicens Mas
August 5	Chiswick, United Kingdom; Hard; W25; Singles and Doubles Draws	(United Kingdom) Samantha Murray; 6–4, 6–4	(Netherlands) Lesley Kerkhove	(Hungary) Gréta Arn (Greece) Valentini Grammatikopoulou	(France) Myrtille Georges (Turkey) Pemra Özgen (France) Irys Ekani (India) Ankita Raina
August 5	Chiswick, United Kingdom; Hard; W25; Singles and Doubles Draws	(Greece) Valentini Grammatikopoulou (United Kingdom) Sarah Beth Grey; 6–7^{(6–8)}, 6–3, [10–5]	(United Kingdom) Freya Christie (United Kingdom) Samantha Murray	(Hungary) Gréta Arn (Greece) Valentini Grammatikopoulou	(France) Myrtille Georges (Turkey) Pemra Özgen (France) Irys Ekani (India) Ankita Raina
August 5	Santa Cruz de la Sierra, Bolivia; Clay; W15; Singles and Doubles Draws	(Argentina) Jazmín Ortenzi; 6–3, 6–2	(Argentina) Victoria Bosio	(Chile) Fernanda Brito (Colombia) Jessica Plazas	(Argentina) Sofía Luini (Bolivia) Noelia Zeballos (Bolivia) Fiorella Durán Montaño (Russia) Anna Morgina
August 5	Santa Cruz de la Sierra, Bolivia; Clay; W15; Singles and Doubles Draws	(Argentina) Jazmín Ortenzi (Bolivia) Noelia Zeballos; 6–1, 4–6, [11–9]	(Russia) Elizaveta Koklina (Russia) Anna Morgina	(Chile) Fernanda Brito (Colombia) Jessica Plazas	(Argentina) Sofía Luini (Bolivia) Noelia Zeballos (Bolivia) Fiorella Durán Montaño (Russia) Anna Morgina
August 5	Olomouc, Czech Republic; Clay; W15; Singles and Doubles Draws	(Japan) Ange Oby Kajuru; 6–3, 6–3	(Czech Republic) Martina Kudelová	(Serbia) Jana Bojović (Slovakia) Jana Jablonovská	(Czech Republic) Veronika Vlkovská (Sweden) Linnéa Malmqvist (Slovenia) Pia Lovrič (Slovakia) Timea Jarušková
August 5	Olomouc, Czech Republic; Clay; W15; Singles and Doubles Draws	(Czech Republic) Klára Hájková (Czech Republic) Aneta Laboutková; 6–4, 2–6, [10–4]	(Slovenia) Pia Lovrič (Japan) Himari Sato	(Serbia) Jana Bojović (Slovakia) Jana Jablonovská	(Czech Republic) Veronika Vlkovská (Sweden) Linnéa Malmqvist (Slovenia) Pia Lovrič (Slovakia) Timea Jarušková
August 5	Nairobi, Kenya; Hard; W15; Singles and Doubles Draws	(India) Mahak Jain; 6–1, 6–4	(Burundi) Sada Nahimana	(Netherlands) Lexie Stevens (Israel) Tamara Barad Itzhaki	(United Kingdom) Tiffany William (Russia) Sofia Dmitrieva (Serbia) Nevena Soković (Gabon) Célestine Avomo Ella
August 5	Nairobi, Kenya; Hard; W15; Singles and Doubles Draws	(Poland) Paulina Jastrzębska (United Kingdom) Tiffany William; 5–7, 7–6^{(7–2)}, [10–4]	(Russia) Sofia Dmitrieva (Russia) Alija Merdeeva	(Netherlands) Lexie Stevens (Israel) Tamara Barad Itzhaki	(United Kingdom) Tiffany William (Russia) Sofia Dmitrieva (Serbia) Nevena Soković (Gabon) Célestine Avomo Ella
August 5	Tabarka, Tunisia; Clay; W15; Singles and Doubles Draws	(Spain) Ángela Fita Boluda; 5–7, 6–4, 6–4	(Romania) Oana Gavrilă	(France) Inès Nicault (Italy) Anna Turati	(Belarus) Katyarina Paulenka (Russia) Iuliia Nikitina (France) Olympe Lancelot (France) Emmanuelle Girard
August 5	Tabarka, Tunisia; Clay; W15; Singles and Doubles Draws	(Spain) Ángela Fita Boluda (Romania) Oana Gavrilă; 6–3, 4–6, [10–5]	(Serbia) Elena Milovanović (Italy) Anna Turati	(France) Inès Nicault (Italy) Anna Turati	(Belarus) Katyarina Paulenka (Russia) Iuliia Nikitina (France) Olympe Lancelot (France) Emmanuelle Girard
August 12	Vancouver Open; Vancouver, Canada; Hard; W100; Singles Draw – Doubles Draw	(United Kingdom) Heather Watson; 7–5, 6–4	(Spain) Sara Sorribes Tormo	(Canada) Leylah Annie Fernandez (Hungary) Tímea Babos	(Australia) Maddison Inglis (Japan) Nao Hibino (Japan) Ena Shibahara (Australia) Priscilla Hon
August 12	Vancouver Open; Vancouver, Canada; Hard; W100; Singles Draw – Doubles Draw	(Japan) Nao Hibino (Japan) Miyu Kato; 6–2, 6–2	(United Kingdom) Naomi Broady (New Zealand) Erin Routliffe	(Canada) Leylah Annie Fernandez (Hungary) Tímea Babos	(Australia) Maddison Inglis (Japan) Nao Hibino (Japan) Ena Shibahara (Australia) Priscilla Hon
August 12	Thoreau Tennis Open; Concord, United States; Hard; W60; Singles Draw – Doubles Draw	(United States) Caroline Dolehide; 6–3, 7–5	(United States) Ann Li	(Belarus) Olga Govortsova (United States) Usue Maitane Arconada	(United States) Allie Kiick (Romania) Ana Bogdan (Slovakia) Jana Čepelová (Poland) Magdalena Fręch
August 12	Thoreau Tennis Open; Concord, United States; Hard; W60; Singles Draw – Doubles Draw	(United States) Angela Kulikov (United States) Rianna Valdes; 7–6^{(7–2)}, 4–6, [17–15]	(United States) Elizabeth Halbauer (United States) Ingrid Neel	(Belarus) Olga Govortsova (United States) Usue Maitane Arconada	(United States) Allie Kiick (Romania) Ana Bogdan (Slovakia) Jana Čepelová (Poland) Magdalena Fręch
August 12	Huangshan, China; Hard; W25; Singles and Doubles Draws	(Chinese Taipei) Lee Ya-hsuan; 6–3, 6–0	(Slovakia) Zuzana Zlochová	(France) Lou Brouleau (China) Liu Fangzhou	(China) Xun Fangying (China) Liu Chang (South Korea) Jang Su-jeong (Japan) Chihiro Muramatsu
August 12	Huangshan, China; Hard; W25; Singles and Doubles Draws	(South Korea) Jang Su-jeong (South Korea) Kim Na-ri; 7–5, 6–1	(Hong Kong) Eudice Chong (China) Ye Qiuyu	(France) Lou Brouleau (China) Liu Fangzhou	(China) Xun Fangying (China) Liu Chang (South Korea) Jang Su-jeong (Japan) Chihiro Muramatsu
August 12	Guayaquil, Ecuador; Clay; W25; Singles and Doubles Draws	(Colombia) Camila Osorio; 7–5, 7–6^{(7–3)}	(United States) Katerina Stewart	(Mexico) Marcela Zacarías (Romania) Gabriela Talabă	(Mexico) Renata Zarazúa (Argentina) Victoria Bosio (Chile) Bárbara Gatica (Japan) Mari Osaka
August 12	Guayaquil, Ecuador; Clay; W25; Singles and Doubles Draws	(Chinese Taipei) Hsu Chieh-yu (Mexico) Marcela Zacarías; 6–4, 6–2	(Colombia) Emiliana Arango (United States) Katerina Stewart	(Mexico) Marcela Zacarías (Romania) Gabriela Talabă	(Mexico) Renata Zarazúa (Argentina) Victoria Bosio (Chile) Bárbara Gatica (Japan) Mari Osaka
August 12	Leipzig, Germany; Clay; W25+H; Singles and Doubles Draws	(Germany) Jule Niemeier; 6–3, 6–3	(Germany) Katharina Gerlach	(Serbia) Olga Danilović (Russia) Valentina Ivakhnenko	(Austria) Julia Grabher (Czech Republic) Barbora Miklová (Germany) Caroline Werner (France) Tessah Andrianjafitrimo
August 12	Leipzig, Germany; Clay; W25+H; Singles and Doubles Draws	(Czech Republic) Petra Krejsová (Czech Republic) Jesika Malečková; 4–6, 6–3, [10–6]	(Kazakhstan) Anna Danilina (Germany) Vivian Heisen	(Serbia) Olga Danilović (Russia) Valentina Ivakhnenko	(Austria) Julia Grabher (Czech Republic) Barbora Miklová (Germany) Caroline Werner (France) Tessah Andrianjafitrimo
August 12	Las Palmas, Spain; Clay; W25+H; Singles and Doubles Draws	(Spain) Nuria Párrizas Díaz; 7–5, 3–6, 7–6^{(7–1)}	(Turkey) Çağla Büyükakçay	(Mexico) Ana Sofía Sánchez (Italy) Camilla Rosatello	(Russia) Daria Mishina (Greece) Despina Papamichail (Spain) Marina Bassols Ribera (Australia) Alexandra Bozovic
August 12	Las Palmas, Spain; Clay; W25+H; Singles and Doubles Draws	(Spain) Marina Bassols Ribera (China) Feng Shuo; 6–3, 6–1	(France) Manon Arcangioli (Belgium) Kimberley Zimmermann	(Mexico) Ana Sofía Sánchez (Italy) Camilla Rosatello	(Russia) Daria Mishina (Greece) Despina Papamichail (Spain) Marina Bassols Ribera (Australia) Alexandra Bozovic
August 12	La Paz, Bolivia; Clay; W15; Singles and Doubles Draws	(Argentina) Jazmín Ortenzi; 6–3, 6–3	(Peru) Romina Ccuno	(Colombia) Jessica Plazas (Bolivia) Noelia Zeballos	(Bolivia) Sofía Cristina Taborga Rollano (Argentina) Sofía Luini (Paraguay) Susan Doldán (Paraguay) Heydi Doldán
August 12	La Paz, Bolivia; Clay; W15; Singles and Doubles Draws	(Argentina) Jazmín Ortenzi (Bolivia) Noelia Zeballos; 6–2, 1–6, [10–4]	(Peru) Romina Ccuno (Colombia) Antonia Samudio	(Colombia) Jessica Plazas (Bolivia) Noelia Zeballos	(Bolivia) Sofía Cristina Taborga Rollano (Argentina) Sofía Luini (Paraguay) Susan Doldán (Paraguay) Heydi Doldán
August 12	Nairobi, Kenya; Hard; W15; Singles and Doubles Draws	(India) Mahak Jain; 6–1, 6–1	(Burundi) Sada Nahimana	(France) Fiona Codino (India) Sravya Shivani Chilakalapudi	(Gabon) Célestine Avomo Ella (Poland) Paulina Jastrzębska (Netherlands) Lexie Stevens (Israel) Tamara Barad Itzhaki
August 12	Nairobi, Kenya; Hard; W15; Singles and Doubles Draws	(India) Mahak Jain (India) Sathwika Sama; 6–4, 6–2	(India) Sravya Shivani Chilakalapudi (India) Snehal Mane	(France) Fiona Codino (India) Sravya Shivani Chilakalapudi	(Gabon) Célestine Avomo Ella (Poland) Paulina Jastrzębska (Netherlands) Lexie Stevens (Israel) Tamara Barad Itzhaki
August 12	Cancún, Mexico; Hard; W15; Singles and Doubles Draws	(Brazil) Ingrid Gamarra Martins; 6–1, 6–3	(United Kingdom) Emilie Lindh	(Australia) Ramona Mataruga (United States) Zoë Gwen Scandalis	(United States) Amber Washington (Guatemala) Melissa Morales (Japan) Eri Shimizu (Japan) Aiko Yoshitomi
August 12	Cancún, Mexico; Hard; W15; Singles and Doubles Draws	(Japan) Haine Ogata (Japan) Aiko Yoshitomi; 0–6, 6–2, [10–6]	(Japan) Eri Shimizu (Sweden) Melis Yasar	(Australia) Ramona Mataruga (United States) Zoë Gwen Scandalis	(United States) Amber Washington (Guatemala) Melissa Morales (Japan) Eri Shimizu (Japan) Aiko Yoshitomi
August 12	Oldenzaal, Netherlands; Clay; W15; Singles and Doubles Draws	(Netherlands) Cindy Burger; 2–6, 6–1, 6–1	(Turkey) İpek Öz	(Netherlands) Eva Vedder (Germany) Julia Kimmelmann	(Italy) Federica Arcidiacono (Netherlands) Suzan Lamens (France) Manon Léonard (Czech Republic) Darja Viďmanová
August 12	Oldenzaal, Netherlands; Clay; W15; Singles and Doubles Draws	(Netherlands) Eva Vedder (Netherlands) Stéphanie Visscher; 7–6^{(7–5)}, 0–0, ret.	(Germany) Julia Kimmelmann (Russia) Anna Pribylova	(Netherlands) Eva Vedder (Germany) Julia Kimmelmann	(Italy) Federica Arcidiacono (Netherlands) Suzan Lamens (France) Manon Léonard (Czech Republic) Darja Viďmanová
August 12	Moscow, Russia; Clay; W15; Singles and Doubles Draws	(Russia) Amina Anshba; 6–4, 6–2	(Russia) Vlada Koval	(Russia) Evgeniya Levashova (Russia) Anastasia Zakharova	(Estonia) Elena Malõgina (Russia) Valeriya Yushchenko (Russia) Noel Saidenova (Russia) Taisya Pachkaleva
August 12	Moscow, Russia; Clay; W15; Singles and Doubles Draws	(Russia) Amina Anshba (Russia) Aleksandra Pospelova; 6–4, 6–3	(Russia) Vlada Koval (Russia) Evgeniya Levashova	(Russia) Evgeniya Levashova (Russia) Anastasia Zakharova	(Estonia) Elena Malõgina (Russia) Valeriya Yushchenko (Russia) Noel Saidenova (Russia) Taisya Pachkaleva
August 12	Tabarka, Tunisia; Clay; W15; Singles and Doubles Draws	(Romania) Andreea Prisăcariu; 6–4, 6–4	(Egypt) Sandra Samir	(Egypt) Lamis Alhussein Abdel Aziz (Italy) Aurora Zantedeschi	(Argentina) Agustina Chlpac (Spain) Noelia Bouzó Zanotti (Kazakhstan) Yekaterina Dmitrichenko (Venezuela) Nadia Echeverría Alam
August 12	Tabarka, Tunisia; Clay; W15; Singles and Doubles Draws	(Slovakia) Katarína Kužmová (Serbia) Elena Milovanović; 3–6, 6–3, [10–7]	(Italy) Beatrice Lombardo (Egypt) Sandra Samir	(Egypt) Lamis Alhussein Abdel Aziz (Italy) Aurora Zantedeschi	(Argentina) Agustina Chlpac (Spain) Noelia Bouzó Zanotti (Kazakhstan) Yekaterina Dmitrichenko (Venezuela) Nadia Echeverría Alam
August 19	Guiyang, China; Hard; W25; Singles and Doubles Draws	(Bulgaria) Aleksandrina Naydenova; 6–4, 6–2	(South Korea) Jang Su-jeong	(China) Xun Fangying (China) Sun Xuliu	(China) Guo Shanshan (South Korea) Kim Da-bin (China) Jiang Xinyu (China) Sun Ziyue
August 19	Guiyang, China; Hard; W25; Singles and Doubles Draws	(China) Jiang Xinyu (China) Tang Qianhui; 7–5, 7–5	(Hong Kong) Eudice Chong (Indonesia) Aldila Sutjiadi	(China) Xun Fangying (China) Sun Xuliu	(China) Guo Shanshan (South Korea) Kim Da-bin (China) Jiang Xinyu (China) Sun Ziyue
August 19	Guayaquil, Ecuador; Clay; W25; Singles and Doubles Draws	(Colombia) Camila Osorio; 7–5, 6–3	(United States) Katerina Stewart	(Chinese Taipei) Hsu Chieh-yu (Romania) Gabriela Talabă	(Mexico) Andrea Renée Villarreal (Ecuador) Charlotte Römer (Mexico) Marcela Zacarías (Australia) Alexandra Osborne
August 19	Guayaquil, Ecuador; Clay; W25; Singles and Doubles Draws	(United States) Katerina Stewart (Romania) Gabriela Talabă; 6–7^{(1–7)}, 7–6^{(8–6)}, [10–7]	(Colombia) Yuliana Lizarazo (Colombia) Camila Osorio	(Chinese Taipei) Hsu Chieh-yu (Romania) Gabriela Talabă	(Mexico) Andrea Renée Villarreal (Ecuador) Charlotte Römer (Mexico) Marcela Zacarías (Australia) Alexandra Osborne
August 19	Braunschweig, Germany; Clay; W25; Singles and Doubles Draws	(Turkey) Çağla Büyükakçay; 6–4, 6–2	(Germany) Katharina Gerlach	(Belgium) Maryna Zanevska (Hungary) Réka Luca Jani	(Spain) Nuria Párrizas Díaz (Germany) Anna Klasen (Germany) Jule Niemeier (Italy) Cristiana Ferrando
August 19	Braunschweig, Germany; Clay; W25; Singles and Doubles Draws	(Russia) Polina Leykina (France) Marine Partaud; 6–4, 1–6, [10–5]	(Uzbekistan) Akgul Amanmuradova (Uzbekistan) Albina Khabibulina	(Belgium) Maryna Zanevska (Hungary) Réka Luca Jani	(Spain) Nuria Párrizas Díaz (Germany) Anna Klasen (Germany) Jule Niemeier (Italy) Cristiana Ferrando
August 19	Tsukuba, Japan; Hard; W25; Singles and Doubles Draws	(Japan) Akiko Omae; 0–6, 7–6^{(7–5)}, 6–3	(Japan) Haruka Kaji	(Japan) Momoko Kobori (Canada) Carol Zhao	(Japan) Mai Hontama (Japan) Naho Sato (Japan) Kyōka Okamura (Japan) Nagi Hanatani
August 19	Tsukuba, Japan; Hard; W25; Singles and Doubles Draws	(Japan) Mana Ayukawa (Japan) Erika Sema; 6–7^{(2–7)}, 6–1, [10–7]	(Japan) Robu Kajitani (Japan) Michika Ozeki	(Japan) Momoko Kobori (Canada) Carol Zhao	(Japan) Mai Hontama (Japan) Naho Sato (Japan) Kyōka Okamura (Japan) Nagi Hanatani
August 19	Wanfercée-Baulet, Belgium; Clay; W15; Singles and Doubles Draws	(Romania) Andreea Mitu; 6–4, 6–3	(Austria) Sinja Kraus	(United Kingdom) Amanda Carreras (United Kingdom) Emily Arbuthnott	(France) Constance Sibille (France) Manon Arcangioli (Belgium) Eliessa Vanlangendonck (France) Lucie Wargnier
August 19	Wanfercée-Baulet, Belgium; Clay; W15; Singles and Doubles Draws	(United Kingdom) Emily Arbuthnott (Belgium) Chelsea Vanhoutte; 3–6, 7–5, [10–8]	(Turkey) Cemre Anıl (Sweden) Marina Yudanov	(United Kingdom) Amanda Carreras (United Kingdom) Emily Arbuthnott	(France) Constance Sibille (France) Manon Arcangioli (Belgium) Eliessa Vanlangendonck (France) Lucie Wargnier
August 19	Cancún, Mexico; Hard; W15; Singles and Doubles Draws	(Mexico) Fernanda Contreras; 6–3, 6–3	(United Kingdom) Aleksandra Pitak	(Japan) Eri Shimizu (Japan) Haine Ogata	(Japan) Aiko Yoshitomi (Canada) Stacey Fung (Australia) Ramona Mataruga (Serbia) Katarina Kozarov
August 19	Cancún, Mexico; Hard; W15; Singles and Doubles Draws	(Japan) Haine Ogata (Japan) Aiko Yoshitomi; 6–4, 6–4	(Mexico) Fernanda Contreras (Mexico) Ana Paula de la Peña	(Japan) Eri Shimizu (Japan) Haine Ogata	(Japan) Aiko Yoshitomi (Canada) Stacey Fung (Australia) Ramona Mataruga (Serbia) Katarina Kozarov
August 19	Lambaré, Paraguay; Clay; W15; Singles and Doubles Draws	(Russia) Anna Morgina; 3–6, 6–2, 6–2	(Chile) Fernanda Brito	(Bolivia) Noelia Zeballos (Paraguay) Montserrat González	(Argentina) Sofía Luini (Chile) Ivania Martinich (United States) Tricia Mar (United States) Sabastiani León
August 19	Lambaré, Paraguay; Clay; W15; Singles and Doubles Draws	(Paraguay) Montserrat González (Bolivia) Noelia Zeballos; 6–0, 6–4	(Chile) Fernanda Brito (Argentina) Sofía Luini	(Bolivia) Noelia Zeballos (Paraguay) Montserrat González	(Argentina) Sofía Luini (Chile) Ivania Martinich (United States) Tricia Mar (United States) Sabastiani León
August 19	Moscow, Russia; Clay; W15; Singles and Doubles Draws	(Russia) Amina Anshba; 6–4, 6–3	(Russia) Elina Avanesyan	(Russia) Vlada Koval (Russia) Anastasia Zakharova	(Russia) Evgeniya Levashova (Russia) Valeriya Yushchenko (Russia) Maria Shusharina (Russia) Taisya Pachkaleva
August 19	Moscow, Russia; Clay; W15; Singles and Doubles Draws	(Russia) Elina Avanesyan (Russia) Taisya Pachkaleva; 6–2, 7–5	(Russia) Ekaterina Makarova (Belarus) Sviatlana Pirazhenka	(Russia) Vlada Koval (Russia) Anastasia Zakharova	(Russia) Evgeniya Levashova (Russia) Valeriya Yushchenko (Russia) Maria Shusharina (Russia) Taisya Pachkaleva
August 19	Tabarka, Tunisia; Clay; W15; Singles and Doubles Draws	(Romania) Andreea Prisăcariu; 2–6, 6–2, 6–1	(Italy) Aurora Zantedeschi	(Portugal) Francisca Jorge (Lithuania) Joana Eidukonytė	(Serbia) Elena Milovanović (Kazakhstan) Yekaterina Dmitrichenko (Italy) Martina Biagianti (Italy) Maria Vittoria Viviani
August 19	Tabarka, Tunisia; Clay; W15; Singles and Doubles Draws	(Spain) Noelia Bouzó Zanotti (Italy) Giulia Crescenzi; 7–6^{(7–5)}, 6–3	(Kazakhstan) Yekaterina Dmitrichenko (Russia) Nina Rudiukova	(Portugal) Francisca Jorge (Lithuania) Joana Eidukonytė	(Serbia) Elena Milovanović (Kazakhstan) Yekaterina Dmitrichenko (Italy) Martina Biagianti (Italy) Maria Vittoria Viviani
August 26	Jinan International Open; Jinan, China; Hard; W60; Singles Draw – Doubles Draw	(China) You Xiaodi; 6–3, 7–6^{(7–5)}	(Australia) Kaylah McPhee	(Serbia) Jovana Jakšić (Japan) Chihiro Muramatsu	(Bulgaria) Aleksandrina Naydenova (China) Zheng Wushuang (China) Wu Meixu (Indonesia) Aldila Sutjiadi
August 26	Jinan International Open; Jinan, China; Hard; W60; Singles Draw – Doubles Draw	(China) Yuan Yue (China) Zheng Wushuang; 1–6, 6–4, [10–7]	(United Kingdom) Samantha Murray (United Kingdom) Eden Silva	(Serbia) Jovana Jakšić (Japan) Chihiro Muramatsu	(Bulgaria) Aleksandrina Naydenova (China) Zheng Wushuang (China) Wu Meixu (Indonesia) Aldila Sutjiadi
August 26	Vienna, Austria; Clay; W25; Singles and Doubles Draws	(Croatia) Tena Lukas; 5–7, 6–4, 6–3	(Romania) Miriam Bulgaru	(Spain) Irene Burillo Escorihuela (Romania) Laura Ioana Paar	(Romania) Nicoleta Dascălu (Hungary) Réka Luca Jani (Russia) Victoria Kan (Spain) Guiomar Maristany
August 26	Vienna, Austria; Clay; W25; Singles and Doubles Draws	(Germany) Vivian Heisen (Germany) Katharina Hobgarski; 7–6^{(7–4)}, 6–4	(Spain) Irene Burillo Escorihuela (Spain) Andrea Lázaro García	(Spain) Irene Burillo Escorihuela (Romania) Laura Ioana Paar	(Romania) Nicoleta Dascălu (Hungary) Réka Luca Jani (Russia) Victoria Kan (Spain) Guiomar Maristany
August 26	Prague, Czech Republic; Clay; W25; Singles and Doubles Draws	(Austria) Barbara Haas; 7–5, 4–6, 6–0	(Germany) Julyette Steur	(Czech Republic) Johana Marková (Hungary) Anna Bondár	(Poland) Katarzyna Piter (Czech Republic) Anastasia Zarycká (Slovenia) Veronika Erjavec (Ukraine) Anastasiya Shoshyna
August 26	Prague, Czech Republic; Clay; W25; Singles and Doubles Draws	(Netherlands) Suzan Lamens (Russia) Marina Melnikova; 6–2, 5–7, [10–8]	(Poland) Katarzyna Piter (Ukraine) Anastasiya Shoshyna	(Czech Republic) Johana Marková (Hungary) Anna Bondár	(Poland) Katarzyna Piter (Czech Republic) Anastasia Zarycká (Slovenia) Veronika Erjavec (Ukraine) Anastasiya Shoshyna
August 26	Kiryat Shmona, Israel; Hard; W25; Singles and Doubles Draws	(Ukraine) Daria Snigur; 6–1, 6–4	(United Kingdom) Maia Lumsden	(France) Victoria Muntean (Germany) Sarah-Rebecca Sekulic	(Italy) Corinna Dentoni (Israel) Lina Glushko (Israel) Maya Tahan (Germany) Natalia Siedliska
August 26	Kiryat Shmona, Israel; Hard; W25; Singles and Doubles Draws	(Israel) Shavit Kimchi (Israel) Maya Tahan; 4–6, 6–4, [12–10]	(France) Victoria Muntean (Germany) Natalia Siedliska	(France) Victoria Muntean (Germany) Sarah-Rebecca Sekulic	(Italy) Corinna Dentoni (Israel) Lina Glushko (Israel) Maya Tahan (Germany) Natalia Siedliska
August 26	Bagnatica, Italy; Clay; W25+H; Singles and Doubles Draws	(Germany) Tamara Korpatsch; 6–1, 6–2	(Italy) Martina Caregaro	(Italy) Elisabetta Cocciaretto (Italy) Martina Trevisan	(France) Amandine Hesse (Brazil) Carolina Alves (Switzerland) Conny Perrin (Bulgaria) Elitsa Kostova
August 26	Bagnatica, Italy; Clay; W25+H; Singles and Doubles Draws	(Brazil) Carolina Alves (Brazil) Gabriela Cé; 6–2, 1–6, [10–5]	(Italy) Martina Caregaro (Italy) Federica Di Sarra	(Italy) Elisabetta Cocciaretto (Italy) Martina Trevisan	(France) Amandine Hesse (Brazil) Carolina Alves (Switzerland) Conny Perrin (Bulgaria) Elitsa Kostova
August 26	Nanao, Japan; Carpet; W25; Singles and Doubles Draws	(Japan) Junri Namigata; 7–6^{(7–5)}, 4–6, 6–2	(Japan) Ayano Shimizu	(Chinese Taipei) Lee Ya-hsuan (Japan) Miyabi Inoue	(Japan) Himeno Sakatsume (United States) Tori Kinard (Japan) Mana Ayukawa (Japan) Erina Hayashi
August 26	Nanao, Japan; Carpet; W25; Singles and Doubles Draws	(Japan) Kanako Morisaki (Japan) Minori Yonehara; 6–1, 6–3	(Japan) Erina Hayashi (Japan) Miharu Imanishi	(Chinese Taipei) Lee Ya-hsuan (Japan) Miyabi Inoue	(Japan) Himeno Sakatsume (United States) Tori Kinard (Japan) Mana Ayukawa (Japan) Erina Hayashi
August 26	Almaty, Kazakhstan; Hard; W25; Singles and Doubles Draws	(Uzbekistan) Akgul Amanmuradova; 6–4, 6–2	(Russia) Valeriya Yushchenko	(Belarus) Anna Kubareva (Russia) Daria Krasnova	(Russia) Anzhelika Isaeva (Turkey) Zeynep Sönmez (Uzbekistan) Nigina Abduraimova (Russia) Ekaterina Nikiforova
August 26	Almaty, Kazakhstan; Hard; W25; Singles and Doubles Draws	(Kyrgyzstan) Ksenia Palkina (Georgia (country)) Sofia Shapatava; 6–4, 7–6^{(7–3)}	(Serbia) Tamara Čurović (Russia) Alina Silich	(Belarus) Anna Kubareva (Russia) Daria Krasnova	(Russia) Anzhelika Isaeva (Turkey) Zeynep Sönmez (Uzbekistan) Nigina Abduraimova (Russia) Ekaterina Nikiforova
August 26	Penza, Russia; Hard; W25+H; Singles and Doubles Draws	(Russia) Vitalia Diatchenko; 6–4, 6–1	(Russia) Kamilla Rakhimova	(Russia) Anastasia Gasanova (Russia) Amina Anshba	(Turkey) Berfu Cengiz (Russia) Mariia Tkacheva (Russia) Sofya Lansere (Russia) Polina Monova
August 26	Penza, Russia; Hard; W25+H; Singles and Doubles Draws	(Russia) Vlada Koval (Russia) Kamilla Rakhimova; 6–0, 6–3	(Russia) Anastasia Gasanova (Ukraine) Ganna Poznikhirenko	(Russia) Anastasia Gasanova (Russia) Amina Anshba	(Turkey) Berfu Cengiz (Russia) Mariia Tkacheva (Russia) Sofya Lansere (Russia) Polina Monova
August 26	Verbier, Switzerland; Clay; W25; Singles and Doubles Draws	(Netherlands) Indy de Vroome; 3–6, 6–3, 7–6^{(7–2)}	(Latvia) Diāna Marcinkēviča	(Liechtenstein) Kathinka von Deichmann (Italy) Lucia Bronzetti	(France) Alice Tubello (Switzerland) Valentina Ryser (Switzerland) Tess Sugnaux (Switzerland) Simona Waltert
August 26	Verbier, Switzerland; Clay; W25; Singles and Doubles Draws	(Switzerland) Xenia Knoll (Switzerland) Simona Waltert; 6–4, 6–3	(Turkey) İpek Soylu (Liechtenstein) Kathinka von Deichmann	(Liechtenstein) Kathinka von Deichmann (Italy) Lucia Bronzetti	(France) Alice Tubello (Switzerland) Valentina Ryser (Switzerland) Tess Sugnaux (Switzerland) Simona Waltert
August 26	Batumi Ladies Open; Batumi, Georgia; Hard; W15; Singles and Doubles Draws	(Russia) Daria Kudashova; 6–4, 6–2	(Poland) Weronika Falkowska	(Russia) Valeriya Olyanovskaya (Belgium) Eliessa Vanlangendonck	(Lithuania) Iveta Dapkutė (Russia) Aleksandra Pospelova (Ukraine) Nadiya Kolb (Russia) Anastasia Zolotareva
August 26	Batumi Ladies Open; Batumi, Georgia; Hard; W15; Singles and Doubles Draws	(Sweden) Jacqueline Cabaj Awad (Turkey) Melis Sezer; 7–6^{(7–3)}, 6–3	(Poland) Weronika Falkowska (Poland) Paulina Jastrzębska	(Russia) Valeriya Olyanovskaya (Belgium) Eliessa Vanlangendonck	(Lithuania) Iveta Dapkutė (Russia) Aleksandra Pospelova (Ukraine) Nadiya Kolb (Russia) Anastasia Zolotareva
August 26	Cancún, Mexico; Hard; W15; Singles and Doubles Draws	(United Kingdom) Emilie Lindh; 6–2, 6–1	(Canada) Stacey Fung	(Brazil) Ingrid Gamarra Martins (United Kingdom) Aleksandra Pitak	(United States) Alyssa Tobita (Japan) Aiko Yoshitomi (United States) Rushri Wijesundera (Russia) Anastasia Sysoeva
August 26	Cancún, Mexico; Hard; W15; Singles and Doubles Draws	(Japan) Haine Ogata (Japan) Aiko Yoshitomi; 2–6, 7–6^{(7–5)}, [10–7]	(Canada) Stacey Fung (United States) Alyssa Tobita	(Brazil) Ingrid Gamarra Martins (United Kingdom) Aleksandra Pitak	(United States) Alyssa Tobita (Japan) Aiko Yoshitomi (United States) Rushri Wijesundera (Russia) Anastasia Sysoeva
August 26	Haren, Netherlands; Clay; W15; Singles and Doubles Draws	(France) Salma Djoubri; 6–1, 6–0	(Germany) Sina Herrmann	(United Kingdom) Emily Arbuthnott (Netherlands) Eva Vedder	(Finland) Anastasia Kulikova (Russia) Anna Pribylova (Germany) Katharina Hering (Netherlands) Stéphanie Visscher
August 26	Haren, Netherlands; Clay; W15; Singles and Doubles Draws	(United Kingdom) Emily Arbuthnott (United Kingdom) Ali Collins; 3–6, 6–0, [10–4]	(Turkey) Cemre Anıl (Russia) Anna Pribylova	(United Kingdom) Emily Arbuthnott (Netherlands) Eva Vedder	(Finland) Anastasia Kulikova (Russia) Anna Pribylova (Germany) Katharina Hering (Netherlands) Stéphanie Visscher
August 26	Vrnjačka Banja, Serbia; Clay; W15; Singles and Doubles Draws	(Croatia) Silvia Njirić; 6–0, 6–3	(Romania) Oana Gavrilă	(Croatia) Ena Kajević (Serbia) Elena Milovanović	(Finland) Oona Orpana (Hungary) Szabina Szlavikovics (Serbia) Draginja Vuković (Serbia) Mihaela Đaković
August 26	Vrnjačka Banja, Serbia; Clay; W15; Singles and Doubles Draws	(Croatia) Mariana Dražić (Lithuania) Justina Mikulskytė; 6–2, 7–6^{(7–5)}	(Czech Republic) Kristýna Hrabalová (Slovakia) Laura Svatíková	(Croatia) Ena Kajević (Serbia) Elena Milovanović	(Finland) Oona Orpana (Hungary) Szabina Szlavikovics (Serbia) Draginja Vuković (Serbia) Mihaela Đaković
August 26	Yeongwol, South Korea; Hard; W15; Singles and Doubles Draws	(South Korea) Ku Yeon-woo; 3–6, 6–3, 6–2	(Thailand) Watsachol Sawatdee	(South Korea) Kim Da-hye (Japan) Rina Saigo	(Australia) Amber Marshall (South Korea) Lee So-ra (Hong Kong) Maggie Ng (South Korea) Sim Sol-hee
August 26	Yeongwol, South Korea; Hard; W15; Singles and Doubles Draws	(South Korea) Jeong Su-nam (South Korea) Kim Na-ri; 6–4, 6–3	(Japan) Rina Saigo (Japan) Yukina Saigo	(South Korea) Kim Da-hye (Japan) Rina Saigo	(Australia) Amber Marshall (South Korea) Lee So-ra (Hong Kong) Maggie Ng (South Korea) Sim Sol-hee
August 26	Tabarka, Tunisia; Clay; W15; Singles and Doubles Draws	(Australia) Seone Mendez; 6–7^{(7–9)}, 6–1, 6–3	(Switzerland) Karin Kennel	(France) Constance Sibille (Hong Kong) Adithya Karunaratne	(Argentina) Agustina Chlpac (Australia) Alicia Smith (Belgium) Chelsea Vanhoutte (Russia) Anna Ukolova
August 26	Tabarka, Tunisia; Clay; W15; Singles and Doubles Draws	(Netherlands) Merel Hoedt (Australia) Seone Mendez; 6–3, 7–5	(Australia) Alicia Smith (Belgium) Chelsea Vanhoutte	(France) Constance Sibille (Hong Kong) Adithya Karunaratne	(Argentina) Agustina Chlpac (Australia) Alicia Smith (Belgium) Chelsea Vanhoutte (Russia) Anna Ukolova

=== September ===
Week of	Tournament	Winner	Runners-up	Semifinalists	Quarterfinalists
September 2	Changsha Open; Changsha, China; Clay; W60; Singles Draw – Doubles Draw	(Serbia) Nina Stojanović; 6–1, 6–1	(Bulgaria) Aleksandrina Naydenova	(China) Yuan Yue (China) Guo Hanyu	(China) Gao Xinyu (Serbia) Natalija Kostić (China) Lu Jiajing (Slovakia) Zuzana Zlochová
September 2	Changsha Open; Changsha, China; Clay; W60; Singles Draw – Doubles Draw	(China) Jiang Xinyu (China) Tang Qianhui; 6–3, 3–6, [11–9]	(India) Rutuja Bhosale (Japan) Erika Sema	(China) Yuan Yue (China) Guo Hanyu	(China) Gao Xinyu (Serbia) Natalija Kostić (China) Lu Jiajing (Slovakia) Zuzana Zlochová
September 2	Zagreb Ladies Open; Zagreb, Croatia; Clay; W60+H; Singles Draw – Doubles Draw	(Ukraine) Maryna Chernyshova; 6–1, 6–4	(Hungary) Réka Luca Jani	(Turkey) Çağla Büyükakçay (Hungary) Anna Bondár	(Bulgaria) Elitsa Kostova (Russia) Valentina Ivakhnenko (Russia) Victoria Kan (Greece) Despina Papamichail
September 2	Zagreb Ladies Open; Zagreb, Croatia; Clay; W60+H; Singles Draw – Doubles Draw	(Hungary) Anna Bondár (Argentina) Paula Ormaechea; 7–5, 7–5	(France) Amandine Hesse (Chile) Daniela Seguel	(Turkey) Çağla Büyükakçay (Hungary) Anna Bondár	(Bulgaria) Elitsa Kostova (Russia) Valentina Ivakhnenko (Russia) Victoria Kan (Greece) Despina Papamichail
September 2	Montreux Ladies Open; Montreux, Switzerland; Clay; W60; Singles Draw – Doubles Draw	(Serbia) Olga Danilović; 6–2, 6–3	(Austria) Julia Grabher	(Brazil) Gabriela Cé (France) Alice Ramé	(Germany) Caroline Werner (Switzerland) Conny Perrin (Switzerland) Simona Waltert (Japan) Mari Osaka
September 2	Montreux Ladies Open; Montreux, Switzerland; Clay; W60; Singles Draw – Doubles Draw	(Switzerland) Xenia Knoll (Luxembourg) Mandy Minella; 6–3, 6–4	(Switzerland) Ylena In-Albon (Switzerland) Conny Perrin	(Brazil) Gabriela Cé (France) Alice Ramé	(Germany) Caroline Werner (Switzerland) Conny Perrin (Switzerland) Simona Waltert (Japan) Mari Osaka
September 2	Prague, Czech Republic; Clay; W25; Singles and Doubles Draws	(Czech Republic) Jesika Malečková; 6–1, 6–2	(Netherlands) Cindy Burger	(Russia) Marina Melnikova (Mexico) Ana Sofía Sánchez	(Norway) Melanie Stokke (Czech Republic) Gabriela Horáčková (Romania) Georgia Crăciun (Netherlands) Suzan Lamens
September 2	Prague, Czech Republic; Clay; W25; Singles and Doubles Draws	(Czech Republic) Anastasia Dețiuc (Czech Republic) Johana Marková; 6–1, 6–3	(Russia) Ekaterina Kazionova (Russia) Anastasiya Komardina	(Russia) Marina Melnikova (Mexico) Ana Sofía Sánchez	(Norway) Melanie Stokke (Czech Republic) Gabriela Horáčková (Romania) Georgia Crăciun (Netherlands) Suzan Lamens
September 2	Trieste, Italy; Clay; W25; Singles and Doubles Draws	(Italy) Elisabetta Cocciaretto; 6–3, 6–1	(Switzerland) Susan Bandecchi	(Italy) Martina Caregaro (Italy) Lucrezia Stefanini	(Bulgaria) Julia Terziyska (Hungary) Dalma Gálfi (Italy) Camilla Scala (Greece) Valentini Grammatikopoulou
September 2	Trieste, Italy; Clay; W25; Singles and Doubles Draws	(Romania) Cristina Dinu (Italy) Angelica Moratelli; 4–6, 6–1, [10–8]	(Hungary) Dalma Gálfi (Greece) Valentini Grammatikopoulou	(Italy) Martina Caregaro (Italy) Lucrezia Stefanini	(Bulgaria) Julia Terziyska (Hungary) Dalma Gálfi (Italy) Camilla Scala (Greece) Valentini Grammatikopoulou
September 2	Kyoto, Japan; Hard (indoor); W25; Singles and Doubles Draws	(Chinese Taipei) Lee Ya-hsuan; 6–3, 6–4	(Japan) Haruka Kaji	(United States) Tori Kinard (Japan) Ayumi Morita	(Japan) Michika Ozeki (Thailand) Nudnida Luangnam (Japan) Akiko Omae (Japan) Risa Ushijima
September 2	Kyoto, Japan; Hard (indoor); W25; Singles and Doubles Draws	(Chinese Taipei) Lee Ya-hsuan (Chinese Taipei) Wu Fang-hsien; 3–6, 6–4, [10–8]	(Japan) Kanako Morisaki (Japan) Minori Yonehara	(United States) Tori Kinard (Japan) Ayumi Morita	(Japan) Michika Ozeki (Thailand) Nudnida Luangnam (Japan) Akiko Omae (Japan) Risa Ushijima
September 2	Marbella, Spain; Clay; W25; Singles and Doubles Draws	(Netherlands) Arantxa Rus; 6–2, 6–2	(Spain) Marina Bassols Ribera	(Spain) Olga Sáez Larra (Egypt) Mayar Sherif	(France) Océane Dodin (Spain) Eva Guerrero Álvarez (Australia) Seone Mendez (Spain) Irene Burillo Escorihuela
September 2	Marbella, Spain; Clay; W25; Singles and Doubles Draws	(Spain) Irene Burillo Escorihuela (Spain) Andrea Lázaro García; 5–7, 6–4, [10–4]	(Netherlands) Arantxa Rus (United Kingdom) Gabriella Taylor	(Spain) Olga Sáez Larra (Egypt) Mayar Sherif	(France) Océane Dodin (Spain) Eva Guerrero Álvarez (Australia) Seone Mendez (Spain) Irene Burillo Escorihuela
September 2	Sajur, Israel; Hard; W15; Singles and Doubles Draws	(South Africa) Chanel Simmonds; 7–5, 6–0	(Israel) Lina Glushko	(United Kingdom) Alicia Barnett (Israel) Shelly Bereznyak	(United Kingdom) Jodie Anna Burrage (France) Victoria Muntean (France) Lou Adler (Israel) Tamara Barad Itzhaki
September 2	Sajur, Israel; Hard; W15; Singles and Doubles Draws	(United Kingdom) Alicia Barnett (South Africa) Chanel Simmonds; 6–4, 6–4	(France) Amandine Cazeaux (Canada) Noëlly Longi Nsimba	(United Kingdom) Alicia Barnett (Israel) Shelly Bereznyak	(United Kingdom) Jodie Anna Burrage (France) Victoria Muntean (France) Lou Adler (Israel) Tamara Barad Itzhaki
September 2	Curtea de Argeș, Romania; Clay; W15; Singles and Doubles Draws	(Romania) Oana Georgeta Simion; 6–3, 6–2	(Czech Republic) Aneta Kladivová	(Spain) Paula Arias Manjón (Serbia) Jana Bojović	(Romania) Karola Patricia Bejenaru (Romania) Oana Gavrilă (Switzerland) Bojana Klincov (United Kingdom) Emily Arbuthnott
September 2	Curtea de Argeș, Romania; Clay; W15; Singles and Doubles Draws	(Romania) Oana Smaranda Corneanu (Romania) Oana Gavrilă; 7–6^{(8–6)}, 4–6, [10–8]	(Romania) Oana Georgeta Simion (Romania) Arina Gabriela Vasilescu	(Spain) Paula Arias Manjón (Serbia) Jana Bojović	(Romania) Karola Patricia Bejenaru (Romania) Oana Gavrilă (Switzerland) Bojana Klincov (United Kingdom) Emily Arbuthnott
September 2	Yeongwol, South Korea; Hard; W15; Singles and Doubles Draws	(South Korea) Choi Ji-hee; 5–7, 6–3, 6–2	(South Korea) Back Da-yeon	(South Korea) Ahn Yu-jin (Chinese Taipei) Cho I-hsuan	(Thailand) Punnin Kovapitukted (South Korea) Hong Seung-yeon (South Korea) Lee Eun-ji (South Korea) Kim Da-hye
September 2	Yeongwol, South Korea; Hard; W15; Singles and Doubles Draws	(South Korea) Hong Seung-yeon (South Korea) Kim Na-ri; 5–7, 7–6^{(7–5)}, [11–9]	(Thailand) Tamachan Momkoonthod (Thailand) Watsachol Sawatdee	(South Korea) Ahn Yu-jin (Chinese Taipei) Cho I-hsuan	(Thailand) Punnin Kovapitukted (South Korea) Hong Seung-yeon (South Korea) Lee Eun-ji (South Korea) Kim Da-hye
September 2	Tabarka, Tunisia; Clay; W15; Singles and Doubles Draws	(Switzerland) Karin Kennel; 6–2, 6–4	(France) Constance Sibille	(France) Olympe Lancelot (France) Margaux Rouvroy	(Norway) Lilly Elida Håseth (France) Sophia Biolay (France) Salma Djoubri (Netherlands) Merel Hoedt
September 2	Tabarka, Tunisia; Clay; W15; Singles and Doubles Draws	(Venezuela) Nadia Echeverría Alam (United Kingdom) Anna Popescu; 4–6, 6–1, [12–10]	(Italy) Giorgia Pinto (Italy) Gaia Squarcialupi	(France) Olympe Lancelot (France) Margaux Rouvroy	(Norway) Lilly Elida Håseth (France) Sophia Biolay (France) Salma Djoubri (Netherlands) Merel Hoedt
September 2	Bucha, Ukraine; Clay; W15; Singles and Doubles Draws	(Lithuania) Justina Mikulskytė; 7–5, 6–2	(Russia) Taisya Pachkaleva	(Ukraine) Anna Parkhomenko (Ukraine) Vladlena Bokova	(Russia) Anna Ureke (Latvia) Margarita Ignatjeva (Ukraine) Kateryna Diatlova (Germany) Constanze Stepan
September 2	Bucha, Ukraine; Clay; W15; Singles and Doubles Draws	(Belarus) Viktoryia Kanapatskaya (Russia) Taisya Pachkaleva; 4–6, 6–2, [10–2]	(Ukraine) Vladlena Bokova (Ukraine) Mariia Hlahola	(Ukraine) Anna Parkhomenko (Ukraine) Vladlena Bokova	(Russia) Anna Ureke (Latvia) Margarita Ignatjeva (Ukraine) Kateryna Diatlova (Germany) Constanze Stepan
September 9	Meitar Open; Meitar, Israel; Hard; W60; Singles Draw – Doubles Draw	(Denmark) Clara Tauson; 4–6, 6–3, 6–1	(Germany) Katharina Hobgarski	(Russia) Kamilla Rakhimova (Bulgaria) Elitsa Kostova	(Russia) Vitalia Diatchenko (Bulgaria) Isabella Shinikova (Netherlands) Quirine Lemoine (Cyprus) Raluca Șerban
September 9	Meitar Open; Meitar, Israel; Hard; W60; Singles Draw – Doubles Draw	(Russia) Sofya Lansere (Russia) Kamilla Rakhimova; 4–6, 6–4, [10–3]	(Russia) Anastasia Gasanova (Ukraine) Valeriya Strakhova	(Russia) Kamilla Rakhimova (Bulgaria) Elitsa Kostova	(Russia) Vitalia Diatchenko (Bulgaria) Isabella Shinikova (Netherlands) Quirine Lemoine (Cyprus) Raluca Șerban
September 9	Sankt Pölten, Austria; Clay; W25; Singles and Doubles Draws	(Argentina) Paula Ormaechea; 2–6, 6–3, 6–3	(Hungary) Réka Luca Jani	(France) Tessah Andrianjafitrimo (Austria) Julia Grabher	(Slovakia) Rebecca Šramková (Hungary) Anna Bondár (Slovenia) Nina Potočnik (Germany) Caroline Werner
September 9	Sankt Pölten, Austria; Clay; W25; Singles and Doubles Draws	(Romania) Irina Fetecău (Hungary) Panna Udvardy; 7–6^{(7–5)}, 0–6, [11–9]	(Hungary) Anna Bondár (Hungary) Réka Luca Jani	(France) Tessah Andrianjafitrimo (Austria) Julia Grabher	(Slovakia) Rebecca Šramková (Hungary) Anna Bondár (Slovenia) Nina Potočnik (Germany) Caroline Werner
September 9	Frýdek-Místek, Czech Republic; Clay; W25; Singles and Doubles Draws	(Georgia (country)) Ekaterine Gorgodze; 6–1, 7–6^{(8–6)}	(Germany) Katharina Gerlach	(Greece) Despina Papamichail (Italy) Martina Colmegna	(Russia) Vlada Koval (Czech Republic) Jesika Malečková (Czech Republic) Anna Sisková (Turkey) Pemra Özgen
September 9	Frýdek-Místek, Czech Republic; Clay; W25; Singles and Doubles Draws	(Croatia) Lea Bošković (Greece) Despina Papamichail; 6–3, 6–2	(Romania) Oana Georgeta Simion (Germany) Julia Wachaczyk	(Greece) Despina Papamichail (Italy) Martina Colmegna	(Russia) Vlada Koval (Czech Republic) Jesika Malečková (Czech Republic) Anna Sisková (Turkey) Pemra Özgen
September 9	Pula, Italy; Clay; W25; Singles and Doubles Draws	(Netherlands) Arantxa Rus; 6–3, 6–7^{(5–7)}, 6–4	(Italy) Elisabetta Cocciaretto	(Russia) Anastasiya Komardina (Russia) Valentina Ivakhnenko	(Russia) Polina Leykina (France) Margot Yerolymos (Italy) Jessica Pieri (Italy) Camilla Scala
September 9	Pula, Italy; Clay; W25; Singles and Doubles Draws	(Mexico) Fernanda Contreras (United States) Chiara Scholl; 6–4, 6–1	(Italy) Monica Cappelletti (Italy) Melania Delai	(Russia) Anastasiya Komardina (Russia) Valentina Ivakhnenko	(Russia) Polina Leykina (France) Margot Yerolymos (Italy) Jessica Pieri (Italy) Camilla Scala
September 9	Redding, United States; Hard; W25; Singles and Doubles Draws	(Romania) Gabriela Talabă; 6–1, 6–1	(United States) Alycia Parks	(Canada) Katherine Sebov (United States) Jada Hart	(United States) Ellie Douglas (United States) Elysia Bolton (United States) Emina Bektas (United States) Pamela Montez
September 9	Redding, United States; Hard; W25; Singles and Doubles Draws	(United States) Emina Bektas (United Kingdom) Tara Moore; 6–3, 6–1	(United States) Catherine Harrison (New Zealand) Paige Hourigan	(Canada) Katherine Sebov (United States) Jada Hart	(United States) Ellie Douglas (United States) Elysia Bolton (United States) Emina Bektas (United States) Pamela Montez
September 9	Buenos Aires, Argentina; Clay; W15; Singles and Doubles Draws	(Argentina) Guillermina Naya; 6–2, 6–2	(Brazil) Eduarda Piai	(Argentina) Solana Sierra (Argentina) Jazmín Ortenzi	(Argentina) Candela Bugnon (Chile) Ivania Martinich (Argentina) María Lourdes Carlé (Brazil) Thaisa Grana Pedretti
September 9	Buenos Aires, Argentina; Clay; W15; Singles and Doubles Draws	(Colombia) María Paulina Pérez (Colombia) Jessica Plazas; 7–6^{(10–8)}, 6–4	(Argentina) Eugenia Ganga (Canada) Raphaëlle Lacasse	(Argentina) Solana Sierra (Argentina) Jazmín Ortenzi	(Argentina) Candela Bugnon (Chile) Ivania Martinich (Argentina) María Lourdes Carlé (Brazil) Thaisa Grana Pedretti
September 9	Anning, China; Clay; W15; Singles and Doubles Draws	(Kazakhstan) Zhibek Kulambayeva; 6–3, 7–5	(Croatia) Oleksandra Oliynykova	(China) Cao Siqi (China) Guo Meiqi	(China) Ma Yexin (China) Yuan Chengyiyi (Japan) Ayaka Okuno (United States) Amy Zhu
September 9	Anning, China; Clay; W15; Singles and Doubles Draws	(Kazakhstan) Zhibek Kulambayeva (China) Ma Yexin; 6–4, 6–3	(China) Liu Siqi (China) Sheng Yuqi	(China) Cao Siqi (China) Guo Meiqi	(China) Ma Yexin (China) Yuan Chengyiyi (Japan) Ayaka Okuno (United States) Amy Zhu
September 9	Cairo, Egypt; Clay; W15; Singles and Doubles Draws	(Sweden) Fanny Östlund; 6–3, 6–4	(Egypt) Sandra Samir	(Italy) Anastasia Piangerelli (Russia) Anastasia Zolotareva	(Russia) Margarita Lazareva (Egypt) Lamis Alhussein Abdel Aziz (Slovakia) Barbora Matúšová (Italy) Federica Prati
September 9	Cairo, Egypt; Clay; W15; Singles and Doubles Draws	(Serbia) Bojana Marinković (Sweden) Fanny Östlund; 6–3, 6–1	(Australia) Yasmina El Sayed (Russia) Daria Solovyeva	(Italy) Anastasia Piangerelli (Russia) Anastasia Zolotareva	(Russia) Margarita Lazareva (Egypt) Lamis Alhussein Abdel Aziz (Slovakia) Barbora Matúšová (Italy) Federica Prati
September 9	Dijon, France; Clay; W15; Singles and Doubles Draws	(France) Jade Suvrijn; 7–6^{(15–13)}, 6–2	(Sweden) Marina Yudanov	(Russia) Anna Ukolova (France) Marie Témin	(France) Carole Monnet (France) Mathilde Armitano (Switzerland) Karin Kennel (Germany) Lara Schmidt
September 9	Dijon, France; Clay; W15; Singles and Doubles Draws	(Romania) Arina Gabriela Vasilescu (Switzerland) Pauline Wuarin; Walkover	(France) Vinciane Rémy (France) Marie Témin	(Russia) Anna Ukolova (France) Marie Témin	(France) Carole Monnet (France) Mathilde Armitano (Switzerland) Karin Kennel (Germany) Lara Schmidt
September 9	Székesfehérvár, Hungary; Clay; W15; Singles and Doubles Draws	(Bosnia and Herzegovina) Nefisa Berberović; 4–6, 6–4, 7–5	(Croatia) Silvia Njirić	(Slovakia) Laura Maluniaková (Hungary) Dorka Drahota-Szabó	(Hungary) Vanda Lukács (Slovenia) Tina Cvetković (Czech Republic) Aneta Kladivová (Hungary) Adrienn Nagy
September 9	Székesfehérvár, Hungary; Clay; W15; Singles and Doubles Draws	(Bosnia and Herzegovina) Nefisa Berberović (Norway) Malene Helgø; 7–5, 6–1	(Slovakia) Katarína Kužmová (Slovakia) Laura Maluniaková	(Slovakia) Laura Maluniaková (Hungary) Dorka Drahota-Szabó	(Hungary) Vanda Lukács (Slovenia) Tina Cvetković (Czech Republic) Aneta Kladivová (Hungary) Adrienn Nagy
September 9	Shymkent, Kazakhstan; Clay; W15; Singles and Doubles Draws	(Russia) Anastasia Zakharova; 6–2, 6–2	(Russia) Angelina Zhuravleva	(Serbia) Tamara Čurović (Belarus) Viktoryia Kanapatskaya	(Russia) Polina Bakhmutkina (Russia) Maria Shusharina (Latvia) Margarita Ignatjeva (Russia) Evgeniya Burdina
September 9	Shymkent, Kazakhstan; Clay; W15; Singles and Doubles Draws	(Russia) Veronika Pepelyaeva (Russia) Mariia Tkacheva; 6–4, 6–4	(Russia) Elina Avanesyan (Belarus) Viktoryia Kanapatskaya	(Serbia) Tamara Čurović (Belarus) Viktoryia Kanapatskaya	(Russia) Polina Bakhmutkina (Russia) Maria Shusharina (Latvia) Margarita Ignatjeva (Russia) Evgeniya Burdina
September 9	Focșani, Romania; Clay; W15; Singles and Doubles Draws	(Germany) Laura Schaeder; 6–2, 6–2	(Romania) Andreea Mitu	(Romania) Andreea Roșca (Romania) Ioana Gașpar	(Romania) Ana Bianca Mihăilă (Romania) Andreea Prisăcariu (Romania) Oana Gavrilă (Italy) Federica Arcidiacono
September 9	Focșani, Romania; Clay; W15; Singles and Doubles Draws	(Romania) Oana Gavrilă (Romania) Andreea Roșca; 1–6, 6–2, [10–4]	(Romania) Andreea Mitu (Romania) Gabriela Nicole Tătăruș	(Romania) Andreea Roșca (Romania) Ioana Gașpar	(Romania) Ana Bianca Mihăilă (Romania) Andreea Prisăcariu (Romania) Oana Gavrilă (Italy) Federica Arcidiacono
September 9	Ceuta, Spain; Hard; W15; Singles and Doubles Draws	(Russia) Ekaterina Shalimova; 6–4, 1–6, 6–1	(Russia) Daria Mishina	(Sweden) Julia Lövqvist (Switzerland) Arlinda Rushiti	(Spain) Ángela Fita Boluda (Spain) Olga Parres Azcoitia (Belgium) Victoria Kalaitzis (France) Manon Arcangioli
September 9	Ceuta, Spain; Hard; W15; Singles and Doubles Draws	(Spain) Noelia Bouzó Zanotti (Spain) Ángeles Moreno Barranquero; 6–3, 1–6, [10–8]	(Russia) Daria Mishina (Russia) Ekaterina Shalimova	(Sweden) Julia Lövqvist (Switzerland) Arlinda Rushiti	(Spain) Ángela Fita Boluda (Spain) Olga Parres Azcoitia (Belgium) Victoria Kalaitzis (France) Manon Arcangioli
September 9	Tabarka, Tunisia; Clay; W15; Singles and Doubles Draws	(Italy) Lisa Pigato; 6–0, 2–0, ret.	(Russia) Anna Ureke	(France) Constance Sibille (Greece) Eleni Kordolaimi	(Germany) Natalia Siedliska (France) Olympe Lancelot (India) Bhuvana Kalva (Tunisia) Chiraz Bechri
September 9	Tabarka, Tunisia; Clay; W15; Singles and Doubles Draws	(Germany) Natalia Siedliska (Russia) Anna Ureke; 7–6^{(9–7)}, 1–6, [10–8]	(Venezuela) Nadia Echeverría Alam (United Kingdom) Anna Popescu	(France) Constance Sibille (Greece) Eleni Kordolaimi	(Germany) Natalia Siedliska (France) Olympe Lancelot (India) Bhuvana Kalva (Tunisia) Chiraz Bechri
September 9	Lawrence, United States; Hard (indoor); W15; Singles and Doubles Draws	(United States) Vanessa Ong; 6–0, 7–5	(United States) Anastasia Nefedova	(United States) Charlotte Chavatipon (Montenegro) Vladica Babić	(United States) Dasha Ivanova (United States) Elizabeth Scotty (Romania) Carmen Roxana Manu (Czech Republic) Aneta Laboutková
September 9	Lawrence, United States; Hard (indoor); W15; Singles and Doubles Draws	(United States) Malkia Ngounoue (Spain) María Toran Ribes; 4–6, 6–2, [10–6]	(Japan) Ayumi Miyamoto (Thailand) Bunyawi Thamchaiwat	(United States) Charlotte Chavatipon (Montenegro) Vladica Babić	(United States) Dasha Ivanova (United States) Elizabeth Scotty (Romania) Carmen Roxana Manu (Czech Republic) Aneta Laboutková
September 16	L'Open 35 de Saint-Malo; Saint-Malo, France; Clay; W60+H; Singles Draw – Doubles Draw	(Russia) Varvara Gracheva; 6–3, 6–2	(Ukraine) Marta Kostyuk	(Paraguay) Verónica Cepede Royg (Russia) Natalia Vikhlyantseva	(Belgium) Maryna Zanevska (Romania) Irina Bara (France) Jessika Ponchet (Spain) Eva Guerrero Álvarez
September 16	L'Open 35 de Saint-Malo; Saint-Malo, France; Clay; W60+H; Singles Draw – Doubles Draw	(Georgia (country)) Ekaterine Gorgodze (Belgium) Maryna Zanevska; 6–7^{(8–10)}, 7–5, [10–8]	(Spain) Aliona Bolsova (Croatia) Tereza Mrdeža	(Paraguay) Verónica Cepede Royg (Russia) Natalia Vikhlyantseva	(Belgium) Maryna Zanevska (Romania) Irina Bara (France) Jessika Ponchet (Spain) Eva Guerrero Álvarez
September 16	Cairns, Australia; Hard; W25; Singles and Doubles Draws	(United States) Asia Muhammad; 6–2, 6–2	(Slovakia) Zuzana Zlochová	(Australia) Maddison Inglis (Australia) Olivia Rogowska	(Japan) Haruna Arakawa (Japan) Yui Chikaraishi (Japan) Michika Ozeki (Slovakia) Tereza Mihalíková
September 16	Cairns, Australia; Hard; W25; Singles and Doubles Draws	(New Zealand) Emily Fanning (Australia) Abbie Myers; 2–6, 7–6^{(7–2)}, [10–7]	(Australia) Maddison Inglis (United States) Asia Muhammad	(Australia) Maddison Inglis (Australia) Olivia Rogowska	(Japan) Haruna Arakawa (Japan) Yui Chikaraishi (Japan) Michika Ozeki (Slovakia) Tereza Mihalíková
September 16	Pula, Italy; Clay; W25; Singles and Doubles Draws	(Italy) Martina Trevisan; 6–4, 5–7, 7–5	(Australia) Seone Mendez	(United Kingdom) Amanda Carreras (Italy) Camilla Scala	(Italy) Jessica Pieri (Russia) Valentina Ivakhnenko (Italy) Stefania Rubini (Liechtenstein) Kathinka von Deichmann
September 16	Pula, Italy; Clay; W25; Singles and Doubles Draws	(Russia) Alina Charaeva (Venezuela) Andrea Gámiz; 7–6^{(7–1)}, 6–3	(Netherlands) Eva Vedder (Netherlands) Stéphanie Visscher	(United Kingdom) Amanda Carreras (Italy) Camilla Scala	(Italy) Jessica Pieri (Russia) Valentina Ivakhnenko (Italy) Stefania Rubini (Liechtenstein) Kathinka von Deichmann
September 16	Royal Cup NLB Montenegro; Podgorica, Montenegro; Clay; W25; Singles and Doubles Draws	(Croatia) Tena Lukas; 6–4, 7–5	(Russia) Marina Melnikova	(Austria) Barbara Haas (Russia) Amina Anshba	(Hungary) Vanda Lukács (Austria) Julia Grabher (Cyprus) Raluca Șerban (Greece) Valentini Grammatikopoulou
September 16	Royal Cup NLB Montenegro; Podgorica, Montenegro; Clay; W25; Singles and Doubles Draws	(Russia) Amina Anshba (Czech Republic) Anastasia Dețiuc; 2–6, 6–3, [10–7]	(Finland) Anastasia Kulikova (Russia) Evgeniya Levashova	(Austria) Barbara Haas (Russia) Amina Anshba	(Hungary) Vanda Lukács (Austria) Julia Grabher (Cyprus) Raluca Șerban (Greece) Valentini Grammatikopoulou
September 16	Arad, Romania; Clay; W25; Singles and Doubles Draws	(Romania) Andreea Mitu; 6–7^{(5–7)}, 6–4, 6–4	(Spain) Irene Burillo Escorihuela	(Romania) Nicoleta Dascălu (Croatia) Lea Bošković	(Romania) Andreea Roșca (Mexico) Ana Sofía Sánchez (Russia) Anastasiya Komardina (Switzerland) Conny Perrin
September 16	Arad, Romania; Clay; W25; Singles and Doubles Draws	(Turkey) Başak Eraydın (Romania) Andreea Mitu; 6–0, 6–1	(Romania) Oana Gavrilă (Romania) Andreea Roșca	(Romania) Nicoleta Dascălu (Croatia) Lea Bošković	(Romania) Andreea Roșca (Mexico) Ana Sofía Sánchez (Russia) Anastasiya Komardina (Switzerland) Conny Perrin
September 16	Roehampton, United Kingdom; Hard; W25; Singles and Doubles Draws	(Spain) Nuria Párrizas Díaz; 6–2, 5–7, 7–5	(Germany) Anna-Lena Friedsam	(Turkey) Pemra Özgen (Germany) Vivian Heisen	(United States) Maria Sanchez (Chinese Taipei) Joanna Garland (Netherlands) Indy de Vroome (United Kingdom) Emma Raducanu
September 16	Roehampton, United Kingdom; Hard; W25; Singles and Doubles Draws	(Germany) Vivian Heisen (Germany) Katharina Hobgarski; 7–5, 1–6, [10–7]	(United Kingdom) Freya Christie (United States) Maria Sanchez	(Turkey) Pemra Özgen (Germany) Vivian Heisen	(United States) Maria Sanchez (Chinese Taipei) Joanna Garland (Netherlands) Indy de Vroome (United Kingdom) Emma Raducanu
September 16	Buenos Aires, Argentina; Clay; W15; Singles and Doubles Draws	(Argentina) María Lourdes Carlé; 6–4, 7–6^{(7–5)}	(Argentina) Julieta Lara Estable	(Brazil) Thaisa Grana Pedretti (Argentina) Guillermina Naya	(Colombia) María Paulina Pérez (Italy) Andrea Agostina Farulla Di Palma (Argentina) Jazmín Ortenzi (United States) Alexa Pitt
September 16	Buenos Aires, Argentina; Clay; W15; Singles and Doubles Draws	(Argentina) Candela Bugnon (Argentina) Guillermina Naya; 2–6, 6–1, [10–8]	(Argentina) María Lourdes Carlé (Argentina) Julieta Lara Estable	(Brazil) Thaisa Grana Pedretti (Argentina) Guillermina Naya	(Colombia) María Paulina Pérez (Italy) Andrea Agostina Farulla Di Palma (Argentina) Jazmín Ortenzi (United States) Alexa Pitt
September 16	Anning, China; Clay; W15; Singles and Doubles Draws	(China) Zheng Wushuang; 7–6^{(9–7)}, 6–3	(China) Guo Meiqi	(China) Yang Yidi (China) Ma Yexin	(China) Lu Jiaxi (China) Wang Meiling (Croatia) Oleksandra Oliynykova (Kazakhstan) Zhibek Kulambayeva
September 16	Anning, China; Clay; W15; Singles and Doubles Draws	(China) Guo Meiqi (China) Zhao Qianqian; 7–6^{(7–5)}, 7–6^{(7–5)}	(Japan) Ayaka Okuno (United States) Holly Verner	(China) Yang Yidi (China) Ma Yexin	(China) Lu Jiaxi (China) Wang Meiling (Croatia) Oleksandra Oliynykova (Kazakhstan) Zhibek Kulambayeva
September 16	Cairo, Egypt; Clay; W15; Singles and Doubles Draws	(Egypt) Sandra Samir; 6–3, 6–4	(Slovenia) Nastja Kolar	(Serbia) Anđela Jocović (Italy) Anastasia Piangerelli	(Slovakia) Barbora Matúšová (Germany) Jasmin Jebawy (Italy) Federica Prati (Netherlands) Dominique Karregat
September 16	Cairo, Egypt; Clay; W15; Singles and Doubles Draws	(Netherlands) Dominique Karregat (Netherlands) Sem Wensveen; 6–1, 4–6, [10–4]	(Japan) Minami Akiyama (Georgia (country)) Zoziya Kardava	(Serbia) Anđela Jocović (Italy) Anastasia Piangerelli	(Slovakia) Barbora Matúšová (Germany) Jasmin Jebawy (Italy) Federica Prati (Netherlands) Dominique Karregat
September 16	Shymkent, Kazakhstan; Clay; W15; Singles and Doubles Draws	(Russia) Elina Avanesyan; 6–2, 7–5	(Serbia) Tamara Čurović	(Russia) Anastasia Zakharova (Russia) Daria Kruzhkova	(Kazakhstan) Yekaterina Dmitrichenko (Russia) Evgeniya Burdina (Belarus) Viktoryia Kanapatskaya (Russia) Polina Bakhmutkina
September 16	Shymkent, Kazakhstan; Clay; W15; Singles and Doubles Draws	(Russia) Elina Avanesyan (Belarus) Viktoryia Kanapatskaya; 6–3, 6–0	(Kazakhstan) Yekaterina Dmitrichenko (Russia) Avelina Sayfetdinova	(Russia) Anastasia Zakharova (Russia) Daria Kruzhkova	(Kazakhstan) Yekaterina Dmitrichenko (Russia) Evgeniya Burdina (Belarus) Viktoryia Kanapatskaya (Russia) Polina Bakhmutkina
September 16	Melilla, Spain; Clay; W15; Singles and Doubles Draws	(Spain) Ángela Fita Boluda; 6–3, 6–4	(United Kingdom) Ali Collins	(Russia) Daria Mishina (Spain) Estrella Cabeza Candela	(Spain) Carlota Martínez Círez (Sweden) Marina Yudanov (Spain) Gemma Lairón Navarro (Belgium) Vicky Van de Peer
September 16	Melilla, Spain; Clay; W15; Singles and Doubles Draws	(Russia) Daria Mishina (Russia) Anna Morgina; 6–1, 6–7^{(2–7)}, [10–6]	(Spain) Ángela Fita Boluda (Spain) Olga Parres Azcoitia	(Russia) Daria Mishina (Spain) Estrella Cabeza Candela	(Spain) Carlota Martínez Círez (Sweden) Marina Yudanov (Spain) Gemma Lairón Navarro (Belgium) Vicky Van de Peer
September 16	Tabarka, Tunisia; Clay; W15; Singles and Doubles Draws	(Italy) Martina Colmegna; 7–6^{(7–2)}, 6–4	(Belgium) Chelsea Vanhoutte	(Venezuela) Nadia Echeverría Alam (Tunisia) Chiraz Bechri	(Colombia) María Herazo González (Italy) Giorgia Pinto (Germany) Katharina Hering (Netherlands) Diana Chehoudi
September 16	Tabarka, Tunisia; Clay; W15; Singles and Doubles Draws	(Germany) Natalia Siedliska (Bolivia) Noelia Zeballos; 7–5, 6–1	(Italy) Martina Colmegna (Colombia) María Herazo González	(Venezuela) Nadia Echeverría Alam (Tunisia) Chiraz Bechri	(Colombia) María Herazo González (Italy) Giorgia Pinto (Germany) Katharina Hering (Netherlands) Diana Chehoudi
September 16	Antalya, Turkey; Hard; W15; Singles and Doubles Draws	(Belarus) Nika Shytkouskaya; 6–0, 6–3	(France) Manon Arcangioli	(Sweden) Julia Lövqvist (Croatia) Mariana Dražić	(Sweden) Jacqueline Cabaj Awad (Sweden) Fanny Östlund (Belgium) Eliessa Vanlangendonck (Russia) Maria Timofeeva
September 16	Antalya, Turkey; Hard; W15; Singles and Doubles Draws	(Japan) Rina Saigo (Japan) Yukina Saigo; 6–2, 6–0	(Switzerland) Svenja Ochsner (Switzerland) Joanne Züger	(Sweden) Julia Lövqvist (Croatia) Mariana Dražić	(Sweden) Jacqueline Cabaj Awad (Sweden) Fanny Östlund (Belgium) Eliessa Vanlangendonck (Russia) Maria Timofeeva
September 16	Lubbock, United States; Hard; W15; Singles and Doubles Draws	(United States) Jessica Livianu; 6–4, 1–6, 6–3	(United States) Dalayna Hewitt	(United States) Lauren Proctor (United States) Dasha Ivanova	(United States) McCartney Kessler (United States) Savannah Broadus (France) Tiphanie Fiquet (Japan) Shiori Fukuda
September 16	Lubbock, United States; Hard; W15; Singles and Doubles Draws	(Mexico) María José Portillo Ramírez (United States) Sofia Sewing; 6–2, 6–4	(Japan) Shiori Fukuda (United States) Ashlyn Krueger	(United States) Lauren Proctor (United States) Dasha Ivanova	(United States) McCartney Kessler (United States) Savannah Broadus (France) Tiphanie Fiquet (Japan) Shiori Fukuda
September 23	Darwin Tennis International; Darwin, Australia; Hard; W60; Singles Draw – Doubles Draw	(Australia) Lizette Cabrera; 6–4, 4–6, 6–2	(Australia) Abbie Myers	(Australia) Ivana Popovic (United States) Asia Muhammad	(Australia) Zoe Hives (Australia) Olivia Rogowska (Australia) Maddison Inglis (Slovakia) Zuzana Zlochová
September 23	Darwin Tennis International; Darwin, Australia; Hard; W60; Singles Draw – Doubles Draw	(Australia) Destanee Aiava (Australia) Lizette Cabrera; 6–4, 2–6, [10–3]	(Australia) Alison Bai (Australia) Jaimee Fourlis	(Australia) Ivana Popovic (United States) Asia Muhammad	(Australia) Zoe Hives (Australia) Olivia Rogowska (Australia) Maddison Inglis (Slovakia) Zuzana Zlochová
September 23	Oeste Ladies Open; Caldas da Rainha, Portugal; Hard; W60; Singles Draw – Doubles Draw	(Bulgaria) Isabella Shinikova; 6–3, 2–0, ret.	(Serbia) Natalija Kostić	(France) Jessika Ponchet (Spain) Cristina Bucșa	(Estonia) Kaia Kanepi (Bulgaria) Viktoriya Tomova (Spain) Georgina García Pérez (Switzerland) Ylena In-Albon
September 23	Oeste Ladies Open; Caldas da Rainha, Portugal; Hard; W60; Singles Draw – Doubles Draw	(France) Jessika Ponchet (Bulgaria) Isabella Shinikova; 6–1, 6–3	(Kazakhstan) Anna Danilina (Germany) Vivian Heisen	(France) Jessika Ponchet (Spain) Cristina Bucșa	(Estonia) Kaia Kanepi (Bulgaria) Viktoriya Tomova (Spain) Georgina García Pérez (Switzerland) Ylena In-Albon
September 23	BBVA Open Ciudad de Valencia; Valencia, Spain; Clay; W60+H; Singles Draw – Doubles Draw	(Russia) Varvara Gracheva; 3–6, 6–2, 6–0	(Germany) Tamara Korpatsch	(Romania) Irina Bara (Ukraine) Marta Kostyuk	(Georgia (country)) Ekaterine Gorgodze (Turkey) Çağla Büyükakçay (Slovakia) Rebecca Šramková (Netherlands) Arantxa Rus
September 23	BBVA Open Ciudad de Valencia; Valencia, Spain; Clay; W60+H; Singles Draw – Doubles Draw	(Romania) Irina Bara (Spain) Rebeka Masarova; 6–4, 7–6^{(7–2)}	(Venezuela) Andrea Gámiz (Australia) Seone Mendez	(Romania) Irina Bara (Ukraine) Marta Kostyuk	(Georgia (country)) Ekaterine Gorgodze (Turkey) Çağla Büyükakçay (Slovakia) Rebecca Šramková (Netherlands) Arantxa Rus
September 23	Central Coast Pro Tennis Open; Templeton, United States; Hard; W60; Singles Draw – Doubles Draw	(United States) Shelby Rogers; 4–6, 6–2, 6–3	(United States) CoCo Vandeweghe	(United States) Emina Bektas (United States) Grace Min	(United States) Maria Mateas (United States) Elysia Bolton (Serbia) Jovana Jakšić (United States) Hanna Chang
September 23	Central Coast Pro Tennis Open; Templeton, United States; Hard; W60; Singles Draw – Doubles Draw	(Montenegro) Vladica Babić (United States) Caitlin Whoriskey; 6–4, 6–2	(Romania) Gabriela Talabă (Mexico) Marcela Zacarías	(United States) Emina Bektas (United States) Grace Min	(United States) Maria Mateas (United States) Elysia Bolton (Serbia) Jovana Jakšić (United States) Hanna Chang
September 23	Brno, Czech Republic; Clay; W25; Singles and Doubles Draws	(Luxembourg) Eléonora Molinaro; 6–4, 6–3	(Italy) Federica Di Sarra	(Germany) Katharina Gerlach (Germany) Julyette Steur	(Czech Republic) Gabriela Horáčková (Slovakia) Jana Jablonovská (Czech Republic) Jesika Malečková (Germany) Lisa Matviyenko
September 23	Brno, Czech Republic; Clay; W25; Singles and Doubles Draws	(Ukraine) Maryna Chernyshova (Slovakia) Chantal Škamlová; 6–7^{(4–7)}, 6–4, [10–4]	(Poland) Anna Hertel (Slovakia) Vivien Juhászová	(Germany) Katharina Gerlach (Germany) Julyette Steur	(Czech Republic) Gabriela Horáčková (Slovakia) Jana Jablonovská (Czech Republic) Jesika Malečková (Germany) Lisa Matviyenko
September 23	Clermont-Ferrand, France; Hard (indoor); W25; Singles and Doubles Draws	(Poland) Urszula Radwańska; 6–7^{(2–7)}, 6–3, 6–1	(Belgium) Lara Salden	(France) Océane Dodin (Netherlands) Arianne Hartono	(France) Lou Adler (Russia) Anastasia Pribylova (France) Manon Léonard (France) Loudmilla Bencheikh
September 23	Clermont-Ferrand, France; Hard (indoor); W25; Singles and Doubles Draws	(Norway) Ulrikke Eikeri (Belgium) Lara Salden; 6–1, 6–4	(France) Lou Brouleau (Romania) Ioana Loredana Roșca	(France) Océane Dodin (Netherlands) Arianne Hartono	(France) Lou Adler (Russia) Anastasia Pribylova (France) Manon Léonard (France) Loudmilla Bencheikh
September 23	Kaposvár, Hungary; Clay; W25; Singles and Doubles Draws	(Serbia) Dejana Radanović; 6–2, 6–3	(Slovenia) Veronika Erjavec	(Hungary) Réka Luca Jani (North Macedonia) Lina Gjorcheska	(Hungary) Anna Bondár (Romania) Georgia Crăciun (Hungary) Dalma Gálfi (Colombia) Emiliana Arango
September 23	Kaposvár, Hungary; Clay; W25; Singles and Doubles Draws	(Hungary) Dalma Gálfi (Hungary) Adrienn Nagy; 7–6^{(7–5)}, 2–6, [10–3]	(Hungary) Anna Bondár (Hungary) Réka Luca Jani	(Hungary) Réka Luca Jani (North Macedonia) Lina Gjorcheska	(Hungary) Anna Bondár (Romania) Georgia Crăciun (Hungary) Dalma Gálfi (Colombia) Emiliana Arango
September 23	Pula, Italy; Clay; W25; Singles and Doubles Draws	(Japan) Yuki Naito; 3–6, 7–5, 6–2	(France) Tessah Andrianjafitrimo	(United Kingdom) Amanda Carreras (Italy) Lucia Bronzetti	(Italy) Tatiana Pieri (Russia) Amina Anshba (Italy) Stefania Rubini (Czech Republic) Anastasia Dețiuc
September 23	Pula, Italy; Clay; W25; Singles and Doubles Draws	(France) Estelle Cascino (Italy) Giorgia Marchetti; 6–4, 6–3	(Ukraine) Ganna Poznikhirenko (United States) Chiara Scholl	(United Kingdom) Amanda Carreras (Italy) Lucia Bronzetti	(Italy) Tatiana Pieri (Russia) Amina Anshba (Italy) Stefania Rubini (Czech Republic) Anastasia Dețiuc
September 23	Roehampton, United Kingdom; Hard; W25; Singles and Doubles Draws	(Germany) Anna-Lena Friedsam; 6–3, 6–3	(Netherlands) Indy de Vroome	(United Kingdom) Emma Raducanu (Croatia) Jana Fett	(United Kingdom) Samantha Murray (Switzerland) Susan Bandecchi (Spain) Nuria Párrizas Díaz (Ukraine) Daria Snigur
September 23	Roehampton, United Kingdom; Hard; W25; Singles and Doubles Draws	(United Kingdom) Samantha Murray (United Kingdom) Anna Smith; 6–4, 6–3	(Germany) Sarah-Rebecca Sekulic (Germany) Julia Wachaczyk	(United Kingdom) Emma Raducanu (Croatia) Jana Fett	(United Kingdom) Samantha Murray (Switzerland) Susan Bandecchi (Spain) Nuria Párrizas Díaz (Ukraine) Daria Snigur
September 23	São Paulo, Brazil; Clay; W15; Singles and Doubles Draws	(Brazil) Carolina Alves; 7–5, 6–1	(Brazil) Thaisa Grana Pedretti	(Brazil) Nathaly Kurata (Chile) Bárbara Gatica	(Colombia) Antonia Samudio (Ecuador) Mell Reasco González (Argentina) Eugenia Ganga (Peru) Romina Ccuno
September 23	São Paulo, Brazil; Clay; W15; Singles and Doubles Draws	(Chile) Bárbara Gatica (Brazil) Rebeca Pereira; 6–2, 6–4	(Argentina) Eugenia Ganga (Brazil) Thaisa Grana Pedretti	(Brazil) Nathaly Kurata (Chile) Bárbara Gatica	(Colombia) Antonia Samudio (Ecuador) Mell Reasco González (Argentina) Eugenia Ganga (Peru) Romina Ccuno
September 23	Anning, China; Clay; W15; Singles and Doubles Draws	(China) Zheng Wushuang; 7–6^{(7–3)}, 6–3	(China) Sun Xuliu	(China) Ma Yexin (China) Guo Meiqi	(China) Lu Jiaxi (Japan) Sakura Hondo (Kazakhstan) Zhibek Kulambayeva (Croatia) Oleksandra Oliynykova
September 23	Anning, China; Clay; W15; Singles and Doubles Draws	(China) Sheng Yuqi (China) Zheng Wushuang; 7–6^{(7–4)}, 7–5	(China) Sun Xuliu (China) Zhao Qianqian	(China) Ma Yexin (China) Guo Meiqi	(China) Lu Jiaxi (Japan) Sakura Hondo (Kazakhstan) Zhibek Kulambayeva (Croatia) Oleksandra Oliynykova
September 23	Cairo, Egypt; Clay; W15; Singles and Doubles Draws	(Slovenia) Nastja Kolar; 6–3, 5–7, 7–6^{(7–4)}	(Egypt) Sandra Samir	(Egypt) Lamis Alhussein Abdel Aziz (Georgia (country)) Zoziya Kardava	(India) Sathwika Sama (Egypt) Aya El Sayed (Russia) Margarita Lazareva (Serbia) Anđela Jocović
September 23	Cairo, Egypt; Clay; W15; Singles and Doubles Draws	(Egypt) Lamis Alhussein Abdel Aziz (Russia) Anastasia Zolotareva; 7–5, 2–6, [10–3]	(Serbia) Bojana Marinković (Egypt) Sandra Samir	(Egypt) Lamis Alhussein Abdel Aziz (Georgia (country)) Zoziya Kardava	(India) Sathwika Sama (Egypt) Aya El Sayed (Russia) Margarita Lazareva (Serbia) Anđela Jocović
September 23	Johannesburg, South Africa; Hard; W15; Singles and Doubles Draws	(South Africa) Chanel Simmonds; 6–0, 6–1	(Australia) Tina Nadine Smith	(Italy) Maria Vittoria Viviani (Netherlands) Merel Hoedt	(France) Caroline Roméo (Austria) Yvonne Neuwirth (Israel) Kristin Younes (India) Ashmitha Easwaramurthi
September 23	Johannesburg, South Africa; Hard; W15; Singles and Doubles Draws	(France) Caroline Roméo (South Africa) Chanel Simmonds; 6–1, 6–3	(Israel) Tamara Barad Itzhaki (United States) Adesuwa Osabuohien	(Italy) Maria Vittoria Viviani (Netherlands) Merel Hoedt	(France) Caroline Roméo (Austria) Yvonne Neuwirth (Israel) Kristin Younes (India) Ashmitha Easwaramurthi
September 23	Tabarka, Tunisia; Clay; W15; Singles and Doubles Draws	(Italy) Aurora Zantedeschi; 6–3, 6–0	(Italy) Martina Colmegna	(Germany) Franziska Sziedat (Denmark) Hannah Viller Møller	(France) Sophia Biolay (Russia) Anna Pribylova (India) Humera Begum Shaik (Belarus) Sadafmoh Tolibova
September 23	Tabarka, Tunisia; Clay; W15; Singles and Doubles Draws	(Italy) Martina Colmegna (Colombia) María Herazo González; 6–3, 6–1	(Russia) Anna Pribylova (Bulgaria) Julia Stamatova	(Germany) Franziska Sziedat (Denmark) Hannah Viller Møller	(France) Sophia Biolay (Russia) Anna Pribylova (India) Humera Begum Shaik (Belarus) Sadafmoh Tolibova
September 23	Antalya, Turkey; Hard; W15; Singles and Doubles Draws	(Russia) Maria Timofeeva; 7–6^{(7–3)}, 7–5	(Switzerland) Svenja Ochsner	(Sweden) Fanny Östlund (Poland) Julia Oczachowska	(Germany) Emily Seibold (Croatia) Mariana Dražić (Belgium) Eliessa Vanlangendonck (Poland) Martyna Kubka
September 23	Antalya, Turkey; Hard; W15; Singles and Doubles Draws	(Poland) Weronika Falkowska (Poland) Martyna Kubka; 5–7, 6–4, [10–8]	(Japan) Rina Saigo (Japan) Yukina Saigo	(Sweden) Fanny Östlund (Poland) Julia Oczachowska	(Germany) Emily Seibold (Croatia) Mariana Dražić (Belgium) Eliessa Vanlangendonck (Poland) Martyna Kubka
September 30	LTP Charleston Pro Tennis II; Charleston, United States; Clay; W60; Singles Draw – Doubles Draw	(United States) Caroline Dolehide; 6–2, 6–7^{(5–7)}, 6–0	(United States) Grace Min	(United States) Elizabeth Halbauer (Colombia) Camila Osorio	(United States) Maria Mateas (Mexico) Renata Zarazúa (Kazakhstan) Anna Danilina (Russia) Marina Melnikova
September 30	LTP Charleston Pro Tennis II; Charleston, United States; Clay; W60; Singles Draw – Doubles Draw	(Kazakhstan) Anna Danilina (United States) Ingrid Neel; 6–1, 6–1	(Montenegro) Vladica Babić (United States) Caitlin Whoriskey	(United States) Elizabeth Halbauer (Colombia) Camila Osorio	(United States) Maria Mateas (Mexico) Renata Zarazúa (Kazakhstan) Anna Danilina (Russia) Marina Melnikova
September 30	Brisbane, Australia; Hard; W25; Singles and Doubles Draws	(United States) Asia Muhammad; 6–3, 3–6, 6–3	(Australia) Maddison Inglis	(South Korea) Park So-hyun (Australia) Ivana Popovic	(Australia) Priscilla Hon (Chinese Taipei) Hsu Chieh-yu (Japan) Chihiro Muramatsu (Australia) Abbie Myers
September 30	Brisbane, Australia; Hard; W25; Singles and Doubles Draws	(Australia) Destanee Aiava (United Kingdom) Naiktha Bains; 6–3, 6–3	(Australia) Alison Bai (New Zealand) Paige Hourigan	(South Korea) Park So-hyun (Australia) Ivana Popovic	(Australia) Priscilla Hon (Chinese Taipei) Hsu Chieh-yu (Japan) Chihiro Muramatsu (Australia) Abbie Myers
September 30	Pula, Italy; Clay; W25; Singles and Doubles Draws	(Croatia) Tena Lukas; 6–4, 6–3	(Brazil) Teliana Pereira	(Egypt) Mayar Sherif (Bulgaria) Elitsa Kostova	(Italy) Federica Di Sarra (Argentina) Nadia Podoroska (Brazil) Carolina Alves (Italy) Angelica Moratelli
September 30	Pula, Italy; Clay; W25; Singles and Doubles Draws	(Japan) Eri Hozumi (Japan) Yuki Naito; 6–4, 7–6^{(7–1)}	(Russia) Amina Anshba (Czech Republic) Anastasia Dețiuc	(Egypt) Mayar Sherif (Bulgaria) Elitsa Kostova	(Italy) Federica Di Sarra (Argentina) Nadia Podoroska (Brazil) Carolina Alves (Italy) Angelica Moratelli
September 30	Sozopol, Bulgaria; Hard; W15; Singles and Doubles Draws	(Bulgaria) Petia Arshinkova; 6–0, 6–4	(Finland) Oona Orpana	(Russia) Ekaterina Reyngold (Slovakia) Michaela Kadlečková	(Bulgaria) Zinovia Vaneva (Greece) Eleni Mtsentlitze (Bulgaria) Stela Peeva (Bulgaria) Gebriela Mihaylova
September 30	Sozopol, Bulgaria; Hard; W15; Singles and Doubles Draws	(Bulgaria) Elena Kraleva (Bulgaria) Stela Peeva; 6–2, 6–7^{(5–7)}, [12–10]	(Russia) Alina Silich (Bulgaria) Ani Vangelova	(Russia) Ekaterina Reyngold (Slovakia) Michaela Kadlečková	(Bulgaria) Zinovia Vaneva (Greece) Eleni Mtsentlitze (Bulgaria) Stela Peeva (Bulgaria) Gebriela Mihaylova
September 30	Santiago, Chile; Clay; W15; Singles and Doubles Draws	(Chile) Fernanda Brito; 6–2, 6–3	(Argentina) Eugenia Ganga	(Argentina) Julia Riera (Colombia) María Paulina Pérez	(Chile) Ivania Martinich (Switzerland) Pauline Wuarin (Peru) Romina Ccuno (Ecuador) Mell Reasco González
September 30	Santiago, Chile; Clay; W15; Singles and Doubles Draws	(Peru) Romina Ccuno (Guatemala) Melissa Morales; 6–3, 6–3	(Ecuador) Mell Reasco González (Colombia) Antonia Samudio	(Argentina) Julia Riera (Colombia) María Paulina Pérez	(Chile) Ivania Martinich (Switzerland) Pauline Wuarin (Peru) Romina Ccuno (Ecuador) Mell Reasco González
September 30	Sharm El Sheikh, Egypt; Hard; W15; Singles and Doubles Draws	(United States) Dasha Ivanova; 6–7^{(11–13)}, 6–3, 6–4	(Malaysia) Jawairiah Noordin	(China) Shan Yu (United Kingdom) Aleksandra Pitak	(Guadeloupe) Anne-Sophie Morandais (India) Sathwika Sama (United States) Taylor Cataldi (Belgium) Victoria Kalaitzis
September 30	Sharm El Sheikh, Egypt; Hard; W15; Singles and Doubles Draws	(United States) Dasha Ivanova (Lithuania) Justina Mikulskytė; 6–1, 7–5	(Slovakia) Romana Čisovská (Poland) Stefania Rogozińska Dzik	(China) Shan Yu (United Kingdom) Aleksandra Pitak	(Guadeloupe) Anne-Sophie Morandais (India) Sathwika Sama (United States) Taylor Cataldi (Belgium) Victoria Kalaitzis
September 30	Andrézieux-Bouthéon, France; Hard (indoor); W15; Singles and Doubles Draws	(Switzerland) Xenia Knoll; 6–0, 7–5	(France) Manon Léonard	(France) Alice Ramé (Netherlands) Arianne Hartono	(Finland) Anastasia Kulikova (France) Lucie Wargnier (France) Théo Gravouil (France) Alice Robbe
September 30	Andrézieux-Bouthéon, France; Hard (indoor); W15; Singles and Doubles Draws	(Italy) Valentina Losciale (France) Carla Touly; 7–5, 6–3	(United Kingdom) Emily Appleton (Japan) Yuriko Lily Miyazaki	(France) Alice Ramé (Netherlands) Arianne Hartono	(Finland) Anastasia Kulikova (France) Lucie Wargnier (France) Théo Gravouil (France) Alice Robbe
September 30	Santarém, Portugal; Hard; W15; Singles and Doubles Draws	(Spain) María Gutiérrez Carrasco; 6–1, 6–2	(Spain) Almudena Sanz-Llaneza Fernández	(Portugal) Maria Inês Fonte (Portugal) Inês Murta	(Estonia) Katriin Saar (Russia) Ekaterina Shalimova (Lithuania) Iveta Dapkutė (Spain) Olga Parres Azcoitia
September 30	Santarém, Portugal; Hard; W15; Singles and Doubles Draws	(Spain) Celia Cerviño Ruiz (Portugal) Matilde Jorge; 6–3, 6–2	(Portugal) Sara Lança (Russia) Ekaterina Shalimova	(Portugal) Maria Inês Fonte (Portugal) Inês Murta	(Estonia) Katriin Saar (Russia) Ekaterina Shalimova (Lithuania) Iveta Dapkutė (Spain) Olga Parres Azcoitia
September 30	Pretoria, South Africa; Hard; W15; Singles and Doubles Draws	(Netherlands) Merel Hoedt; 6–2, 6–1	(Austria) Yvonne Neuwirth	(South Africa) Chanel Simmonds (India) Zeel Desai	(France) Caroline Roméo (Belgium) Clara Vlasselaer (Australia) Tina Nadine Smith (Netherlands) Lian Tran
September 30	Pretoria, South Africa; Hard; W15; Singles and Doubles Draws	(France) Caroline Roméo (South Africa) Chanel Simmonds; Walkover	(India) Zeel Desai (Netherlands) Merel Hoedt	(South Africa) Chanel Simmonds (India) Zeel Desai	(France) Caroline Roméo (Belgium) Clara Vlasselaer (Australia) Tina Nadine Smith (Netherlands) Lian Tran
September 30	Tabarka, Tunisia; Clay; W15; Singles and Doubles Draws	(Bolivia) Noelia Zeballos; 6–2, 6–3	(Italy) Irene Lavino	(France) Julie Belgraver (Russia) Anna Pribylova	(Italy) Giulia Crescenzi (Switzerland) Aline Thommen (Denmark) Sofia Samavati (France) Sophia Biolay
September 30	Tabarka, Tunisia; Clay; W15; Singles and Doubles Draws	(Italy) Giulia Crescenzi (Italy) Aurora Zantedeschi; 5–7, 7–6^{(7–4)}, [10–8]	(Netherlands) Isabelle Haverlag (Russia) Anna Pribylova	(France) Julie Belgraver (Russia) Anna Pribylova	(Italy) Giulia Crescenzi (Switzerland) Aline Thommen (Denmark) Sofia Samavati (France) Sophia Biolay
September 30	Antalya, Turkey; Hard; W15; Singles and Doubles Draws	(Uzbekistan) Sabina Sharipova; 6–3, 6–1	(Germany) Anja Wildgruber	(Japan) Rina Saigo (Poland) Martyna Kubka	(Germany) Franziska Sziedat (Russia) Maria Timofeeva (Germany) Kathleen Kanev (Switzerland) Fiona Ganz
September 30	Antalya, Turkey; Hard; W15; Singles and Doubles Draws	(Japan) Rina Saigo (Japan) Yukina Saigo; 6–2, 6–3	(Belarus) Anna Kubareva (Belarus) Nika Shytkouskaya	(Japan) Rina Saigo (Poland) Martyna Kubka	(Germany) Franziska Sziedat (Russia) Maria Timofeeva (Germany) Kathleen Kanev (Switzerland) Fiona Ganz
September 30	Chornomorsk, Ukraine; Clay; W15; Singles and Doubles Draws	(Russia) Evgeniya Levashova; 6–0, 6–4	(Italy) Federica Arcidiacono	(Russia) Taisya Pachkaleva (Russia) Valeriya Olyanovskaya	(Russia) Anna Ureke (Russia) Elina Nepliy (Czech Republic) Lucie Petruželová (Ukraine) Yulia Zhytelna
September 30	Chornomorsk, Ukraine; Clay; W15; Singles and Doubles Draws	(Russia) Evgeniya Levashova (Russia) Taisya Pachkaleva; 6–4, 6–1	(Ukraine) Iryna Lysykh (Ukraine) Yulia Zhytelna	(Russia) Taisya Pachkaleva (Russia) Valeriya Olyanovskaya	(Russia) Anna Ureke (Russia) Elina Nepliy (Czech Republic) Lucie Petruželová (Ukraine) Yulia Zhytelna
September 30	Norman, United States; Hard (indoor); W15; Singles and Doubles Draws	(Italy) Anna Turati; 6–2, 6–3	(United States) Dalayna Hewitt	(United States) Amy Zhu (United States) Savannah Broadus	(United States) Andie Daniell (United States) Lorraine Guillermo (United States) Carmen Corley (United States) Emma Davis
September 30	Norman, United States; Hard (indoor); W15; Singles and Doubles Draws	(Chile) Fernanda Labraña (Italy) Anna Turati; 6–1, 7–5	(Dominican Republic) Kelly Williford (United States) Amy Zhu	(United States) Amy Zhu (United States) Savannah Broadus	(United States) Andie Daniell (United States) Lorraine Guillermo (United States) Carmen Corley (United States) Emma Davis
