= Tennis at the 2022 South American Games – Women's singles =

Women's singles
- Tennis at the 2022 South American Games

Events
Singles	men	women
Doubles	men	women	mixed
← 2018 ·	South American Games	· 2026 →

The women's singles event at the 2022 South American Games was held from 11 to 15 october.

== Draw ==
=== Key ===
- Q = Qualifier
- WC = Wild card
- LL = Lucky loser
- Alt = Alternate
- ITF = ITF entry
- PR = Protected ranking
- SR = Special ranking
- SE = Special exempt
- JE = Junior exempt
- JR = Junior Accelerator Programme entrant
- CO = College Accelerator Programme entrant
- NG = Next Gen Accelerator Program entrant
- w/o = Walkover
- r = Retired
- d = Defaulted

=== Final four ===
Semifinals
(Paraguay) Verónica Cepede Royg	6	6
(Colombia) Yuliana Lizarazo	1	3
(Colombia) María Herazo González	6	6
(Paraguay) Leyla Britez	1	0

Final
(Paraguay) Verónica Cepede Royg	2	3
(Colombia) María Herazo González	6	6
Bronze medal match
(Colombia) Yuliana Lizarazo	6	6
(Paraguay) Leyla Britez	3	0

=== Top half ===
First round
(Peru) C Soares	3	6	6
(Bolivia) C Padilla	6	1	1
(Argentina) L Ayala	6	6
(Brazil) R Pereira	1	4
(Ecuador) TI Andrade Sabando	1	6
(Chile) F Labraña	6	2	6
(Peru) L Pérez	6	6
(Uruguay) J Rodríguez	4	1
(Argentina) MV Burstein	6	6^{5}	2
(Venezuela) D Rivera	2	7^{7}	6

Second round
(Paraguay) V Cepede Royg	6	6
(Peru) C Soares	2	0
(Argentina) L Ayala	7	5	3
(Chile) F Labraña	5	7	6
(Colombia) Y Lizarazo	6	6
(Peru) L Pérez	3	1
(Venezuela) D Rivera	4	2
(Chile) F Astete	6	6

Quarterfinals
(Paraguay) V Cepede Royg	4	6	6
(Chile) F Labraña	6	2	0
(Colombia) Y Lizarazo	6	6
(Chile) F Astete	3	1

Semifinals
(Paraguay) V Cepede Royg	6	6
(Colombia) Y Lizarazo	1	3

=== Bottom half ===
First round
(Uruguay) A Cuestas	1	1
(Brazil) A Candiotto	6	6
(Paraguay) L Escauriza	1	4
(Peru) A Iamachkine	6	6
(Colombia) MP Pérez	6	6
(Bolivia) A Hollweg	1	1
(Venezuela) N Echeverría Alam	5	4
(Argentina) S Luini	7	6
(Ecuador) C Romero	1	5
(Paraguay) L Britez	6	7

Second round
(Colombia) M Herazo González	7	6
(Brazil) A Candiotto	5	4
(Peru) A Iamachkine	2	3
(Bolivia) N Zeballos	6	6
(Colombia) MP Pérez	7^{7}	6
(Argentina) S Luini	6^{1}	2
(Paraguay) L Britez	7	3	6
(Chile) D Seguel	5	6	4

Quarterfinals
(Colombia) M Herazo González	6	6
(Bolivia) N Zeballos	4	1
(Colombia) MP Pérez	4	1
(Paraguay) L Britez	6	6

Semifinals
(Colombia) M Herazo González	6	6
(Paraguay) L Britez	1	0
