= Tennis at the 2022 Bolivarian Games =

Tennis competitions at the 2022 Bolivarian Games

- Tennis pictogram
- Venue: Valledupar Snowshoe Complex
- Dates: 29–05 July 2022
- Competitors: 49 from 9 nations

Tennis competitions at the 2022 Bolivarian Games in Valledupar, Colombia were held from 29 to 05 July 2022 at Valledupar Snowshoe Complex in Zipaquirá, a sub-venue outside Valledupar. Five medal events were scheduled to be contested; singles and doubles for men and women, mixed doubles. Athletes from 11 countries competed in tennis at the Bolivarian Games.

== Medal summary ==
=== Medal table ===
* Host nation (Host nation)

| Rank | Nation | Gold | Silver | Bronze | Total |
|---|---|---|---|---|---|
| 1 | Colombia (COL)* | 3 | 1 | 0 | 4 |
| 2 | Ecuador (ECU) | 1 | 2 | 0 | 3 |
| 3 | Venezuela (VEN) | 1 | 0 | 2 | 3 |
| 4 | Chile (CHI) | 0 | 2 | 2 | 4 |
| 5 | Peru (PER) | 0 | 0 | 1 | 1 |
| Totals (5 entries) | | 5 | 5 | 5 | 15 |

=== Medalists ===
| Event | Gold | Silver | Bronze |
|---|---|---|---|
| Men's singles | Juan Sebastián Gómez; Colombia | Matías Soto; Chile | Diego Fernández Flores; Chile |
| Women's singles | Yuliana Lizarazo; Colombia | Mell Reasco; Ecuador | Fernanda Labraña; Chile |
| Men's doubles | Venezuela; Brandon Pérez; Ricardo Rodríguez-Pace | Chile; Diego Fernández Flores; Matías Soto | Peru; Sergio Galdós; Conner Huertas del Pino |
| Women's doubles | Colombia; Yuliana Lizarazo; María Paulina Pérez | Ecuador; Mell Reasco; Camila Romero | Venezuela; Sofia Cabezas; Vanesa Suárez |
| Mixed doubles | Ecuador; Tania Andrade; Omar Suárez | Colombia; María Herazo González; Juan Sebastián Gómez | Venezuela; Daniela Rivera; Rafael Abdul Salam |
