= Tennis at the 2022 South American Games – Men's singles =

Men's singles
- Tennis at the 2022 South American Games

Events
Singles	men	women
Doubles	men	women	mixed
← 2018 ·	South American Games	· 2026 →

The men's singles event at the 2022 South American Games was held from 11 to 15 october.

== Draw ==
=== Key ===
- Q = Qualifier
- WC = Wild card
- LL = Lucky loser
- Alt = Alternate
- ITF = ITF entry
- PR = Protected ranking
- SR = Special ranking
- SE = Special exempt
- JE = Junior exempt
- JR = Junior Accelerator Programme entrant
- CO = College Accelerator Programme entrant
- NG = Next Gen Accelerator Program entrant
- w/o = Walkover
- r = Retired
- d = Defaulted

=== Final four ===
Semifinals
(Chile) Alejandro Tabilo	3	3
(Brazil) Gustavo Heide	6	6
(Chile) Gonzalo Lama	2	6	1
(Argentina) Facundo Díaz Acosta	6	3	6

Final
(Brazil) Gustavo Heide	5	5
(Argentina) Facundo Díaz Acosta	7	7
Bronze medal match
(Chile) Alejandro Tabilo	w/o
(Chile) Gonzalo Lama

=== Top half ===
First round
(Paraguay) M Vergara	1	2
(Ecuador) C March	6	6
(Uruguay) JM Fumeaux	2	3
(Peru) I Buse	6	6
(Chile) D Fernández Flores	6	1	6
(Colombia) JM Benítez Chavarriaga	2	6	2

Second round
(Chile) A Tabilo	6	6
(Ecuador) C March	3	2
(Peru) I Buse	6	6
(Argentina) V Aboian	2	4
(Peru) N Álvarez	2	6	6
(Chile) D Fernández Flores	6	3	1
(Bolivia) A Mendoza	6^{6}	1
(Brazil) G Heide	7^{8}	6

Quarterfinals
(Chile) A Tabilo	2	6	6
(Peru) I Buse	6	4	2
(Peru) N Álvarez	3	6^{3}
(Brazil) G Heide	6	7^{7}

Semifinals
(Chile) A Tabilo	3	3
(Brazil) G Heide	6	6

=== Bottom half ===
First round
(Uruguay) W Wibmer	6^{3}	2
(Bolivia) B Arias	7^{7}	6
(Brazil) JV Couto Loureiro	6	6
(Paraguay) J Borba	4	4
(Venezuela) B Pérez	6	6
(Ecuador) MM Larrea	4	2

Second round
(Argentina) T Farjat	7^{7}	6
(Paraguay) D Vallejo	6^{5}	4
(Bolivia) B Arias	2	2
(Chile) G Lama	6	6
(Peru) A Huertas del Pino
(Brazil) JV Couto Loureiro	W/O
(Venezuela) B Pérez	1	0
(Argentina) F Díaz Acosta	6	6

Quarterfinals
(Argentina) T Farjat	0r
(Chile) G Lama	5
(Brazil) JV Couto Loureiro	3	3
(Argentina) F Díaz Acosta	6	6

Semifinals
(Chile) G Lama	2	6	1
(Argentina) F Díaz Acosta	6	3	6
