= Tennis at the 2022 South American Games – Women's doubles =

Women's doubles
- Tennis at the 2022 South American Games

Events
| Singles | men | women |
| Doubles | men | women | mixed |
| ← 2018 · | South American Games | · 2026 → |

The women's doubles event at the 2022 South American Games was held from 12 to 14 October.

== Draw ==
=== Key ===
- Q = Qualifier
- WC = Wild card
- LL = Lucky loser
- Alt = Alternate
- ITF = ITF entry
- PR = Protected ranking
- SR = Special ranking
- SE = Special exempt
- JE = Junior exempt
- JR = Junior Accelerator Programme entrant
- CO = College Accelerator Programme entrant
- NG = Next Gen Accelerator Program entrant
- w/o = Walkover
- r = Retired
- d = Defaulted

1st round
(Argentina) MV Burstein (Argentina) S Luini | 5 | 5
(Ecuador) C Romero (Ecuador) TI Andrade Sabando | 7 | 7
(Peru) C Soares (Peru) L Pérez | 7 | 6
(Uruguay) A Cuestas (Uruguay) J Rodríguez | 5 | 2

2nd round
(Brazil) I Gamarra Martins (Brazil) R Pereira | 7 | 6
(Ecuador) C Romero (Ecuador) TI Andrade Sabando | 5 | 2
(Venezuela) A Gámiz (Venezuela) N Echeverría Alam | 6 | 6
(Bolivia) A Hollweg (Bolivia) C Padilla | 1 | 1
(Paraguay) L Escauriza (Paraguay) L Britez | 3 | 2
(Chile) F Labraña (Chile) D Seguel | 6 | 6
(Peru) C Soares (Peru) L Pérez | 1 | 3
(Colombia) Y Lizarazo (Colombia) M Herazo | 6 | 6

Semifinals
(Brazil) I Gamarra Martins (Brazil) R Pereira | 6 | 7 | 10
(Venezuela) A Gámiz (Venezuela) N Echeverría Alam | 7 | 5 | 3
(Chile) F Labraña (Chile) D Seguel | 6^{3} | 4
(Colombia) Y Lizarazo (Colombia) M Herazo | 7^{7} | 6

Finals
(Brazil) I Gamarra Martins (Brazil) R Pereira | 3 | 4
(Colombia) Y Lizarazo (Colombia) M Herazo | 6 | 6
Third place
(Venezuela) A Gámiz (Venezuela) N Echeverría Alam | 6 | 6^{1} | [7]
(Chile) F Labraña (Chile) D Seguel | 4 | 7^{7} | [10]
