= Tennis at the 2022 South American Games – Mixed doubles =

Mixed doubles
- Tennis at the 2022 South American Games

Events
Singles	men	women
Doubles	men	women	mixed
← 2018 ·	South American Games	· 2026 →

The mixed doubles event at the 2022 South American Games was held from 12 to 14 October.

== Draw ==
=== Key ===
- Q = Qualifier
- WC = Wild card
- LL = Lucky loser
- Alt = Alternate
- ITF = ITF entry
- PR = Protected ranking
- SR = Special ranking
- SE = Special exempt
- JE = Junior exempt
- JR = Junior Accelerator Programme entrant
- CO = College Accelerator Programme entrant
- NG = Next Gen Accelerator Program entrant
- w/o = Walkover
- r = Retired
- d = Defaulted

Quarterfinals
(Brazil) Ingrid Gamarra Martins (Brazil) Orlando Luz	6	7
(Peru) Anastasia Iamachkine (Peru) Ignacio Buse	1	5
(Venezuela) Andrea Gámiz (Venezuela) Ricardo Rodríguez-Pace	2	6	[9]
(Paraguay) Daniel Vallejo (Paraguay) Verónica Cepede Royg	6	3	[11]
(Chile) Diego Fernández Flores (Chile) Fernanda Astete	4	4
(Colombia) JM Benítez Chavarriaga (Colombia) María Paulina Pérez	6	6
(Argentina) Lourdes Ayala (Argentina) Valerio Aboian	3	2
(Bolivia) Federico Zeballos (Bolivia) Noelia Zeballos	6	6

Semifinals
(Brazil) Ingrid Gamarra Martins (Brazil) Orlando Luz	4	6	[6]
(Paraguay) Daniel Vallejo (Paraguay) Verónica Cepede Royg	6	2	[10]
(Colombia) JM Benítez Chavarriaga (Colombia) María Paulina Pérez	3	1
(Bolivia) Federico Zeballos (Bolivia) Noelia Zeballos	6	6

Final
(Paraguay) Daniel Vallejo (Paraguay) Verónica Cepede Royg	6	3	[10]
(Bolivia) Federico Zeballos (Bolivia) Noelia Zeballos	4	6	[5]
Third place
(Brazil) Ingrid Gamarra Martins (Brazil) Orlando Luz	6	2	[10]
(Colombia) JM Benítez Chavarriaga (Colombia) María Paulina Pérez	2	6	[7]
