= Tennis at the 2022 South American Games – Men's doubles =

Men's doubles
- Tennis at the 2022 South American Games

Events
Singles	men	women
Doubles	men	women	mixed
← 2018 ·	South American Games	· 2026 →

The men's doubles event at the 2022 South American Games was held from 12 to 14 October.

== Draw ==
=== Key ===
- Q = Qualifier
- WC = Wild card
- LL = Lucky loser
- Alt = Alternate
- ITF = ITF entry
- PR = Protected ranking
- SR = Special ranking
- SE = Special exempt
- JE = Junior exempt
- JR = Junior Accelerator Programme entrant
- CO = College Accelerator Programme entrant
- NG = Next Gen Accelerator Program entrant
- w/o = Walkover
- r = Retired
- d = Defaulted

1st round
(Chile) A Tabilo (Chile) G Lama	6	6
(Ecuador) C March (Ecuador) MM Larrea	2	0

2nd round
(Bolivia) B Arias (Bolivia) F Zeballos	3	6	[10]
(Chile) A Tabilo (Chile) G Lama	6	4	[7]
(Peru) A Huertas del Pino (Peru) N Álvarez
(Venezuela) B Pérez (Venezuela) R Rodríguez-Pace	w/o
(Paraguay) J Borba (Paraguay) M Vergara	4	3
(Argentina) F Díaz Acosta (Argentina) T Farjat	6	6
(Uruguay) JM Fumeaux (Uruguay) W Wibmer	3	2
(Brazil) G Heide (Brazil) O Luz	6	6

Semifinals
(Bolivia) B Arias (Bolivia) F Zeballos	6	6
(Venezuela) B Pérez (Venezuela) R Rodríguez-Pace	2	2
(Argentina) F Díaz Acosta (Argentina) T Farjat	4	5
(Brazil) G Heide (Brazil) O Luz	6	7

Finals
(Bolivia) B Arias (Bolivia) F Zeballos	4	5
(Brazil) G Heide (Brazil) O Luz	6	7
Third place
(Venezuela) B Pérez (Venezuela) R Rodríguez-Pace	2r
(Argentina) F Díaz Acosta (Argentina) T Farjat	4
