= Julieta Lara Estable =

Argentine tennis player

- Country (sports): Argentina
- Born: 15 July 1997 (age 28) Buenos Aires, Argentina
- Plays: Right (two-handed backhand)
- Prize money: $106,387

Singles
- Career record: 266–184
- Career titles: 5 ITF
- Highest ranking: No. 297 (23 September 2024)
- Current ranking: No. 927 (18 May 2026)

Doubles
- Career record: 172–146
- Career titles: 5 ITF
- Highest ranking: No. 378 (15 August 2016)
- Current ranking: No. 1052 (18 May 2026)

Team competitions
- Fed Cup: 3–1
- Last updated on: 24 May 2026.

Julieta Lara Estable (born 15 July 1997) is an inactive Argentine tennis player.

Estable has a career-high singles ranking by the WTA of 297, achieved on 23 September 2024. She also has a career-high WTA doubles ranking of 378, achieved on 15 August 2016.

Estable made her Billie Jean King Cup debut for Argentina in 2024. They went to the play-offs with their team. Competing for Argentina in BJK Cup, Estable has a win–loss record of 3–1 (as of September 2024).

== ITF Circuit finals ==
=== Singles: 18 (5 titles, 13 runner-ups) ===
| Legend W60 tournaments W50 tournaments W25/35 tournaments W10/15 tournaments | Finals by surface Hard (0–1) Clay (5–12) |

| Result | W–L | Date | Tournament | Tier | Surface | Opponent | Score |
|---|---|---|---|---|---|---|---|
| Loss | 0–1 | Oct 2013 | ITF Marcos Juarez, Argentina | W10 | Clay | (Argentina) Carolina Zeballos | 6–4, 6–7^{(3)}, 5–7 |
| Win | 1–1 | Jun 2014 | ITF Villa Del Dique, Argentina | W10 | Clay | (Argentina) Daniela Farfan | 6–3, 3–6, 6–4 |
| Loss | 1–2 | Jul 2014 | ITF Santa Cruz, Bolivia | W10 | Clay | (Chile) Andrea Koch Benvenuto | 2–6, 5–7 |
| Loss | 1–3 | May 2015 | ITF Villa María, Argentina | W10 | Clay | (Chile) Fernanda Brito | 3–6, 6–4, 6–7^{(2)} |
| Loss | 1–4 | Jul 2015 | Bursa Cup, Turkey | W10 | Clay | (Bulgaria) Isabella Shinikova | 3–6, 4–6 |
| Win | 2–4 | Aug 2015 | ITF Koper, Slovenia | W10 | Clay | (Serbia) Dejana Radanović | 3–6, 6–4, 6–2 |
| Loss | 2–5 | Nov 2015 | ITF Caracas, Venezuela | W10 | Hard | (Argentina) Catalina Pella | 2–6, 3–6 |
| Loss | 2–6 | Apr 2016 | ITF Bauru, Brazil | W10 | Clay | (Argentina) Paula Ormaechea | 6–1, 3–6, 5–7 |
| Win | 3–6 | Jul 2016 | ITF Târgu Jiu, Romania | W10 | Clay | (Moldova) Alexandra Perper | 4–6, 6–4, 6–0 |
| Loss | 3–7 | Apr 2017 | ITF São José dos Campos, Brazil | W15 | Clay | (Brazil) Nathaly Kurata | 6–7^{(3)}, 0–6 |
| Win | 4–7 | May 2019 | ITF Tabarka, Tunisia | W15 | Clay | (Chile) Bárbara Gatica | 6–2, 3–6, 7–6^{(5)} |
| Win | 5–7 | Jun 2019 | ITF Tabarka, Tunisia | W15 | Clay | (Argentina) Eugenia Ganga | 4–6, 6–4, 6–4 |
| Loss | 5–8 | Sep 2019 | ITF Buenos Aires, Argentina | W15 | Clay | (Argentina) María Lourdes Carlé | 4–6, 6–7^{(5)} |
| Loss | 5–9 | Aug 2023 | ITF Lima, Peru | W15 | Clay | (Liechtenstein) Sylvie Zund | 6–3, 3–6, 0–6 |
| Loss | 5–10 | Oct 2023 | ITF Luján, Argentina | W25 | Clay | (France) Séléna Janicijevic | 4–6, 6–7^{(0)} |
| Loss | 5–11 | Mar 2024 | ITF Córdoba, Argentina | W15 | Clay | (Argentina) Jazmín Ortenzi | 2–6, 0–6 |
| Loss | 5-12 | Mar 2024 | ITF São João da Boa Vista, Brazil | W15 | Clay | (Brazil) Carolina Alves | 6–4, 1–6, 3–6 |
| Loss | 5–13 | Aug 2024 | ITF Arequipa, Peru | W35 | Clay | (France) Alice Tubello | 3–6, 1–6 |

=== Doubles: 23 (5 titles, 18 runner-ups) ===
| Result | W–L | Date | Tournament | Tier | Surface | Partner | Opponents | Score |
|---|---|---|---|---|---|---|---|---|
| Win | 1–0 | Aug 2024 | ITF El Trébol, Argentina | W10 | Clay | (Argentina) Melina Ferrero | (Argentina) Ana Victoria Gobbi Monllau (Argentina) Constanza Vega | 7–5, 6–4 |
| Loss | 1–1 | Jul 2015 | ITF Târgu Jiu, Romania | W10 | Clay | (Argentina) Daniela Farfán | (Romania) Raluca Ciufrila (Romania) Ioana Loredana Roșca | 6–4, 6-7^{(4)}, [6–10] |
| Win | 2–1 | Aug 2015 | ITF Koper, Slovenia | W10 | Clay | (Slovakia) Barbara Kötelesová | (Slovakia) Jana Jablonovská (Slovenia) Manca Pislak | 3–6, 7–5, [10–7] |
| Loss | 2–2 | Sep 2015 | ITF Varna, Bulgaria | W10 | Clay | (Argentina) Ana Victoria Gobbi Monllau | (Romania) Irina Bara (Bulgaria) Isabella Shinikova | 5–7, 6–4, [4–10] |
| Loss | 2–3 | Nov 2015 | ITF Caracas, Venezuela | W10 | Clay | (Argentina) Ana Victoria Gobbi Monllau | (Argentina) Catalina Pella (Brazil) Laura Pigossi | 1–1 ret. |
| Loss | 2–4 | Mar 2016 | ITF Weston, United States | W10 | Clay | (Italy) Jasmine Paolini | (United States) Katerina Stewart (Switzerland) Tess Sugnaux | 6–7^{(2)}, 3–6 |
| Loss | 2–5 | Apr 2016 | ITF Rio Preto, Brazil | W10 | Clay | (Brazil) Carolina Alves | (Chile) Fernanda Brito (Argentina) Constanza Vega | 6–2, 4–6, [6–10] |
| Loss | 2–6 | Apr 2016 | ITF Bauru, Brazil | W10 | Clay | (Brazil) Carolina Alves | (Brazil) Nathaly Kurata (Brazil) Eduarda Piai | 6–7^{(4)}, 5–7 |
| Loss | 2–7 | Jun 2016 | ITF Périgueux, France | W25 | Clay | (Argentina) Guadalupe Pérez Rojas | (Switzerland) Conny Perrin (Slovakia) Chantal Škamlová | 3–6, 6–3, [7–10] |
| Loss | 2–8 | Aug 2016 | ITF Târgu Jiu, Romania | W10 | Clay | (Argentina) Daniela Farfan | (Romania) Jaqueline Cristian (Greece) Despina Papamichail | 7-6^{(5)}, 0–6, [5–10] |
| Loss | 2–9 | Apr 2017 | ITF São José dos Campos, Brazil | W15 | Clay | (Argentina) Victoria Bosio | (Brazil) Gabriela Cé (Brazil) Thaisa Grana Pedretti | 7–5, 6-7^{(6)}, [3–10] |
| Loss | 2–10 | Sep 2017 | ITF Buenos Aires, Argentina | W15 | Clay | (Argentina) Melina Ferrero | (United Kingdom) Emily Appleton (Argentina) María Lourdes Carlé | 3–6, 1–6 |
| Loss | 2–11 | Apr 2018 | ITF Villa Dolores, Argentina | W15 | Clay | (Argentina) Victoria Bosio | (Chile) Bárbara Gatica (Brazil) Rebeca Pereira | 2–6, 4–6 |
| Loss | 2–12 | Sep 2018 | ITF Buenos Aires, Argentina | W15 | Clay | (Argentina) Catalina Pella | (Chile) Fernanda Brito (Paraguay) Camila Giangreco Campiz | 5–7, 6–7^{(2)} |
| Loss | 2–13 | Jun 2019 | ITF Tabarka, Tunisia | W15 | Clay | (Colombia) María Paulina Pérez | (France) Carla Touly (Italy) Anna Turati | 7-6^{(5)}, 5–7, [8–10] |
| Loss | 2–14 | Sep 2019 | ITF Buenos Aires, Argentina | W15 | Clay | (Argentina) María Lourdes Carlé | (Argentina) Candela Bugnon (Argentina) Guillermina Naya | 2–6, 6–1, [8–10] |
| Loss | 2–15 | Aug 2021 | ITF San Bartolomé, Spain | W60 | Clay | (Argentina) María Lourdes Carlé | (Netherlands) Arianne Hartono (Australia) Olivia Tjandramulia | 4–6, 6–2, [7–10] |
| Win | 3–15 | Feb 2022 | ITF Tucumán, Argentina | W25 | Clay | (Argentina) María Lourdes Carlé | (Italy) Nicole Fossa Huergo (Bolivia) Noelia Zeballos | 3–6, 6–0, [10–7] |
| Win | 4–15 | Jun 2023 | ITF Rosario, Argentina | W15 | Clay | (Argentina) Guillermina Naya | (Ecuador) Mell Reasco (Ecuador) Camila Romero | walkover |
| Loss | 4–16 | Aug 2023 | ITF Junin, Argentina | W25 | Clay | (Chile) Fernanda Labraña | (Peru) Romina Ccuno (Mexico) Victoria Rodríguez | 2–6, 6–2, [7–10] |
| Loss | 4–17 | Aug 2023 | ITF Lima, Peru | W15 | Clay | (Argentina) Lourdes Ayala | (Peru) Romina Ccuno (Chile) Fernanda Labraña | 4–6, 4–6 |
| Loss | 4–18 | Jul 2024 | ITF Torino, Italy | W35 | Clay | (Chile) Fernanda Labraña | (Slovenia) Živa Falkner (Slovenia) Pia Lovrič | 6–1, 2–6, [10–12] |
| Win | 5–18 | Jun 2025 | ITF Kuršumlijska Banja, Serbia | W15 | Clay | (Argentina) María Florencia Urrutia | (Spain) Ana Giraldi Requena (Colombia) María Herazo González | 6–1, 6-7^{(3)}, [10–5] |

== National representation ==
=== Fed Cup/Billie Jean King Cup ===
==== Doubles (3–1) ====
| Edition | Stage | Date | Location | Against | Surface | Partner | Opponents | W/L | Score |
|---|---|---|---|---|---|---|---|---|---|
| 2024 | Americas Zone I | Apr 2024 | Bogotá (COL) | Ecuador | Clay | María Lourdes Carlé | Tania Isabel Andrade Sabando Camila Romero | W | 6–1, 6–2 |
| 2024 | Americas Zone I | Apr 2024 | Bogotá (COL) | Venezuela | Clay | Luisina Giovannini | Sabrina Balderrama; Fabiana Gamboa | W | 3–6, 6–1, [10–4] |
| 2024 | Americas Zone I | Apr 2024 | Bogotá (COL) | Chile | Clay | Martina Capurro Taborda | Jimar Geraldine Gerald González; Antonia Vergara Rivera | W | 6–2, 6–4 |
| 2024 | Americas Zone I | Apr 2024 | Bogotá (COL) | Colombia | Clay | Julia Riera | Yuliana Lizarazo; María Paulina Pérez | L | 7–5, 2–6, [7–10] |
