= Federico Zeballos =

Bolivian tennis player

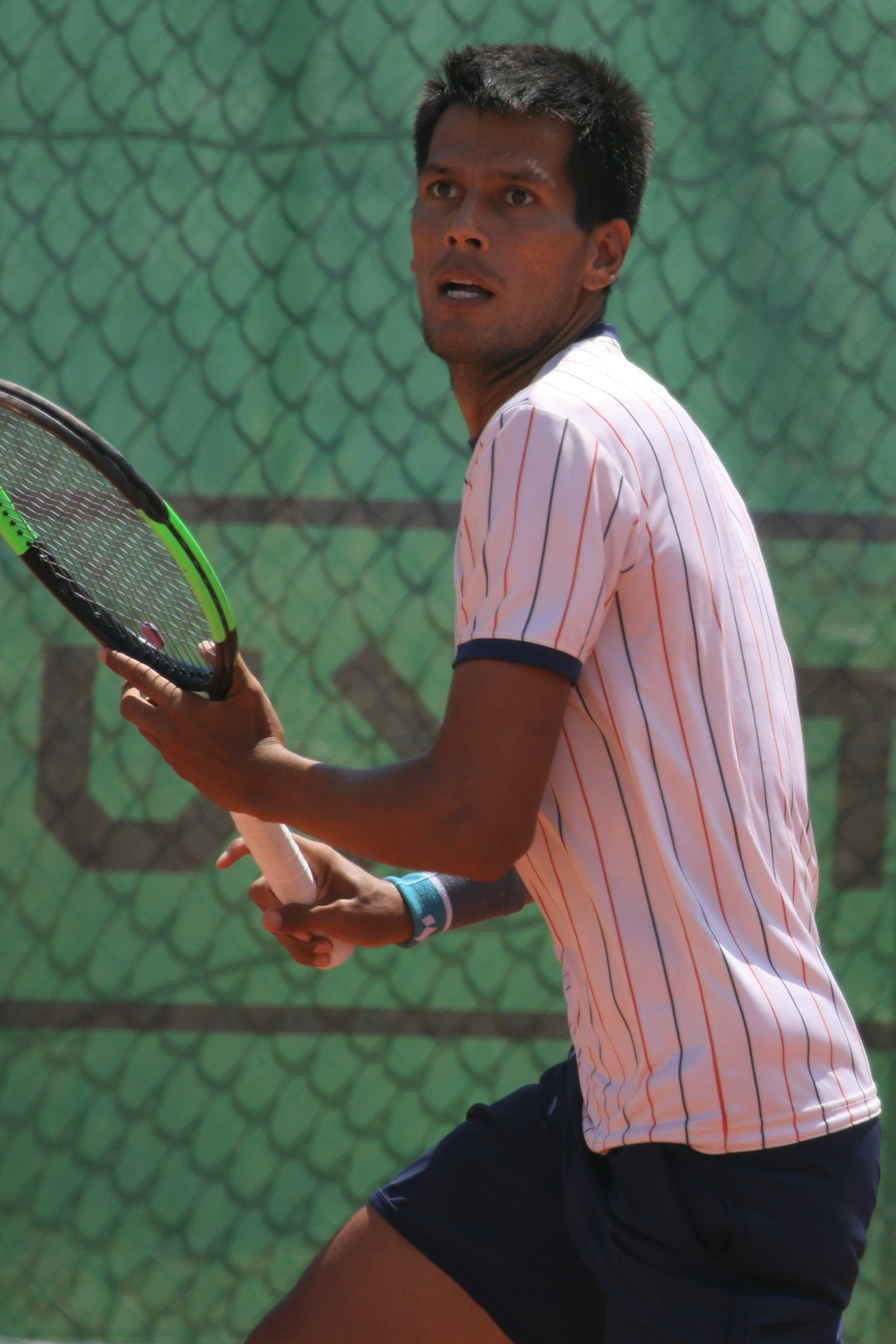
- Zeballos at the 2022 Internationaux de Tennis de Blois
- Full name: Federico Andrés Zeballos Melgar
- Country (sports): Bolivia
- Residence: Santa Cruz de la Sierra, Bolivia
- Born: 30 May 1988 (age 37) Santa Cruz de la Sierra, Bolivia
- Plays: Right-handed (two-handed backhand)
- Prize money: US$206,071

Singles
- Career record: 6–14 (at ATP Tour level, Grand Slam level, and in Davis Cup)
- Career titles: 0
- Highest ranking: No. 440 (8 October 2018)
- Current ranking: -

Doubles
- Career record: 12–20 (at ATP Tour level, Grand Slam level, and in Davis Cup)
- Career titles: 0
- Highest ranking: No. 79 (18 March 2024)
- Current ranking: No. 183 (21 Aprile 2025)

Team competitions
- Davis Cup: 23–17
Medal record
Representing Bolivia
Pan American Games
Silver medal – second place	2019 Lima	Mixed doubles
South American Games
Silver medal – second place	2022 Asunción	Doubles
Silver medal – second place	2022 Asunción	Mixed doubles
- Last updated on: 21 April 2025.

Federico Andrés Zeballos Melgar (Latin American Spanish: [feðeˈɾiko anˈdɾes seˈβaʝos melˈɣaɾ]; born 30 May 1988) is a Bolivian tennis player.

Zeballos has a career high ATP doubles ranking of world No. 79, achieved on 18 March 2024. He also has a career high singles ranking of No. 440 achieved on 8 October 2018. Zeballos has won some ITF singles and several ITF doubles titles.

Zeballos has represented Bolivia at Davis Cup, where he has a win–loss record of 23–17.

== Personal life ==
His sister, Noelia, is also a tennis player. Neither sibling is related to Argentine tennis player Horacio Zeballos.

== Future and Challenger finals ==
=== Singles: 13 (5–8) ===
Legend ATP Challengers 0 (0–0) ITF Futures 13 (5–8)	Titles by surface Hard (1–1) Clay (4–7)

Result	W–L	Date	Tournament	Tier	Surface	Opponent	Score
Loss	0–1	Sep 2012	Cochabamba, Bolivia F1	Futures	Clay	(Argentina) Juan-Pablo Amado	3–6, 1–6
Win	1–1	Oct 2012	La Paz, Bolivia F4	Futures	Clay	(Argentina) José Maria Páez	6–2, 6–4
Loss	1–2	Oct 2013	Arequipa, Peru F1	Futures	Clay	(Peru) Duilio Beretta	1–6, 6–7^{(6–8)}
Loss	1–3	Sep 2014	La Paz, Bolivia F2	Futures	Clay	(Argentina) Matías Zukas	3–6, 0–6
Loss	1–4	Nov 2014	Popayán, Colombia F8	Futures	Hard	(Colombia) Eduardo Struvay	4–6, 5–7
Loss	1–5	Sep 2015	Cochabamba, Bolivia F3	Futures	Clay	(Mexico) Manuel Sánchez	5–7, 3–6
Loss	1–6	Oct 2016	Cairo, Egypt F26	Futures	Clay	(Czech Republic) Jaroslav Pospíšil	3–6, 6–3, 1–6
Loss	1–7	Oct 2016	Quito, Ecuador F2	Futures	Clay	(Brazil) João Menezes	3–6, 6–3, 5–7
Win	2–7	Nov 2016	La Paz, Bolivia F1	Futures	Clay	(Argentina) Matías Zukas	5–7, 7–5, 6–4
Win	3–7	May 2018	Morelia, Mexico F1	Futures	Hard	(Guatemala) Christopher Díaz Figueroa	6–3, 6–2
Win	4–7	Sep 2018	Santa Cruz, Bolivia F1	Futures	Clay	(Argentina) Matías Zukas	6–3, 7–6^{(7–4)}
Loss	4–8	Sep 2018	Santa Cruz, Bolivia F2	Futures	Clay	(Argentina) Matías Franco Descotte	3–6, 6–1, 4–6
Win	5–8	Sep 2018	La Paz, Bolivia F3	Futures	Clay	(Bolivia) Alejandro Mendoza	6–2, 6–1
