= Boris Arias =

Bolivian tennis player (born 1993)

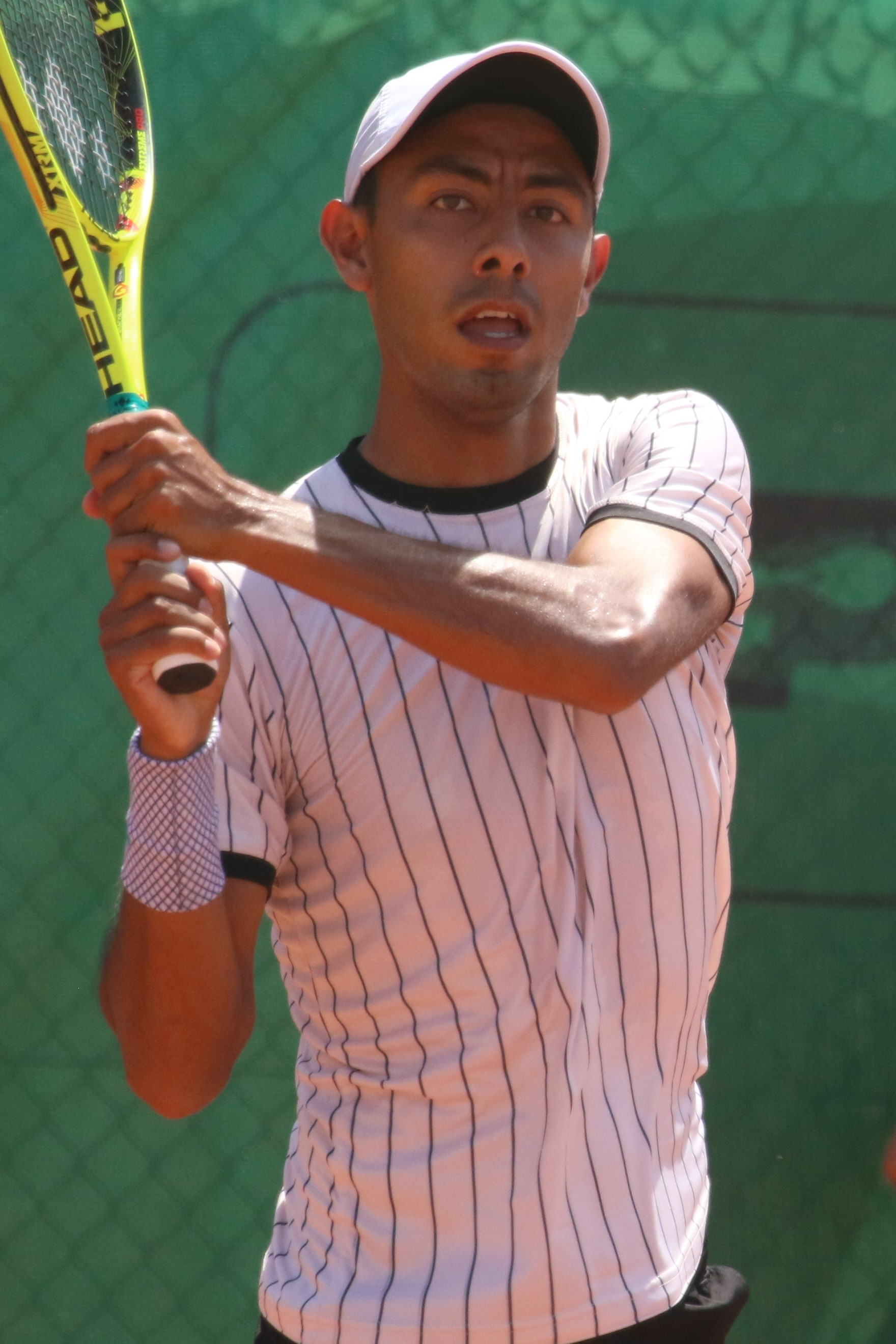
- Arias at the 2022 Internationaux de Tennis de Blois
- Country (sports): Bolivia
- Born: 9 November 1993 (age 32) La Paz, Bolivia
- Height: 1.85 m (6 ft 1 in)
- Plays: Right-handed (two-handed backhand)
- College: Louisiana State University (2012–2016)
- Coach: Danny Bryan, Rodrigo Arias, Ramiro Videa
- Prize money: US $197,197

Singles
- Career record: 1–1 (at ATP Tour level, Grand Slam level, and in Davis Cup)
- Career titles: 0 ITF
- Highest ranking: No. 1,065 (16 July 2012)
- Current ranking: No, 1,284 (26 October 2026)

Doubles
- Career record: 8–14 (at ATP Tour level, Grand Slam level, and in Davis Cup)
- Career titles: 6 ITF
- Highest ranking: No. 80 (18 March 2024)
- Current ranking: No. 148 (26 October 2026)

Team competitions
- Davis Cup: 4–1
Medal record
Men's tennis
Representing Bolivia
South American Games
Silver medal – second place	2022 Asunción	Doubles
- Last updated on: 30 October 2026.

Boris Arias (Spanish pronunciation: [ˈboɾis ˈaɾjas]; born 9 November 1993) is a Bolivian tennis player. He has a career high ATP doubles ranking of world No. 80 achieved on 18 March 2024 and a career high singles ranking of No. 1,065 achieved on 16 July 2012. Arias has won six ITF Futures doubles titles.

Arias has represented Bolivia at the Davis Cup, where he has a W/L record of 4–1.
