= Noelia Zeballos =

Bolivian tennis player (born 1994)

- Full name: Noelia Zeballos Melgar
- Country (sports): Bolivia
- Born: 2 May 1994 (age 32) Santa Cruz, Bolivia
- Height: 1.68 m (5 ft 6 in)
- Plays: Right (two-handed backhand)
- Prize money: $140,175

Singles
- Career record: 294–281
- Career titles: 3 ITF
- Highest ranking: No. 440 (8 May 2023)
- Current ranking: No. 699 (27 July 2026)

Doubles
- Career record: 317–228
- Career titles: 24 ITF
- Highest ranking: No. 242 (9 June 2025)
- Current ranking: No. 396 (27 July 2026)

Team competitions
- Fed Cup: 38–36
Medal record
Representing Bolivia
Pan American Games
| Silver medal – second place | 2019 Lima | Mixed doubles |
South American Games
| Silver medal – second place | 2022 Asunción | Mixed doubles |
- Last updated on: 5 August 2026.

Noelia Zeballos Melgar (Spanish pronunciation: [noˈelja seˈβaʝos melˈɣaɾ]; born 2 May 1994) is a Bolivian tennis player.

Zeballos has a career-high singles ranking by the WTA of 440, achieved on 8 May 2023. She also has a career-high doubles ranking of world No. 242, reached on 9 June 2025. Zeballos has won three singles and 24 doubles titles on the ITF Women's Circuit.

Playing for Bolivia Fed Cup team, she has an overall win–loss record of 38–36 (as of August 2026).

Her brother Federico is also a professional tennis player.

== ITF Circuit finals ==
=== Singles: 7 (3 titles, 4 runner-ups) ===
Legend
W25 tournaments
W15 tournaments

| Result | W–L | Date | Tournament | Tier | Surface | Opponent | Score |
|---|---|---|---|---|---|---|---|
| Win | 1–0 | Jul 2019 | ITF Lima, Peru | W15 | Clay | (Venezuela) Nadia Echeverría Alam | 6–3, 6–1 |
| Win | 2–0 | Oct 2019 | ITF Tabarka, Tunisia | W15 | Clay | (Italy) Irene Lavino | 6–2, 6–3 |
| Loss | 2–1 | Dec 2019 | ITF Heraklion, Greece | W15 | Clay | (Russia) Darya Astakhova | 2–6, 0–6 |
| Loss | 2–2 | May 2022 | ITF São Paulo, Brazil | W15 | Clay | (Argentina) Martina Capurro Taborda | 6–2, 3–6, 0–6 |
| Loss | 2–3 | Aug 2022 | ITF Rio de Janeiro, Brazil | W25 | Clay | (Brazil) Gabriela Cé | 6–4, 5–7, 3–6 |
| Win | 3–3 | Nov 2022 | ITF Lima, Peru | W15 | Clay | (United States) Sofia Sewing | 3–6, 6–3, 6–0 |
| Loss | 3–4 | May 2024 | ITF Santo Domingo, Dominican Republic | W35 | Hard | (United States) Victoria Hu | 7–5, 3–6, 1–6 |

=== Doubles: 52 (24 titles, 28 runner-ups) ===
Legend
W40/50 tournaments
W25/35 tournaments
W10/15 tournaments

| Result | W–L | Date | Tournament | Tier | Surface | Partner | Opponents | Score |
|---|---|---|---|---|---|---|---|---|
| Win | 1–0 | Jul 2014 | ITF Santa Cruz, Bolivia | W10 | Clay | (Paraguay) Sara Giménez | (Argentina) Sofía Luini (Argentina) Guadalupe Pérez Rojas | 6–7^{(3)}, 6–4, [10–8] |
| Loss | 1–1 | Aug 2015 | ITF Bursa, Turkey | W10 | Hard | (Bolivia) María Álvarez Terán | (Germany) Katharina Hering (United Kingdom) Mirabelle Njoze | 6–7^{(4)}, 4–6 |
| Loss | 1–2 | Mar 2016 | ITF São José, Brazil | W10 | Clay | (Colombia) María Herazo González | (Brazil) Carolina Alves (Paraguay) Camila Giangreco Campiz | 3–6, 4–6 |
| Loss | 1–3 | Oct 2016 | ITF Hammamet, Tunisia | W10 | Clay | (Chile) Fernanda Brito | (Brazil) Carolina Alves (Switzerland) Karin Kennel | 2–6, 6–4, [9–11] |
| Loss | 1–4 | Oct 2016 | ITF Hammamet, Tunisia | W10 | Clay | (Chile) Fernanda Brito | (France) Alice Bacquié (Austria) Pia König | 4–6, 1–6 |
| Loss | 1–5 | Nov 2016 | ITF Hammamet, Tunisia | W10 | Clay | (Brazil) Carolina Alves | (Romania) Diana Enache (Romania) Ilona Georgiana Ghioroaie | 6–3, 1–6, [8–10] |
| Loss | 1–6 | Nov 2016 | ITF Hammamet, Tunisia | W10 | Clay | (Brazil) Carolina Alves | (Serbia) Tamara Čurović (Belgium) Déborah Kerfs | 6–7^{(5)}, 3–6 |
| Win | 2–6 | May 2017 | ITF Santa Margherita di Pula, Italy | W15 | Clay | (Chile) Fernanda Brito | (Italy) Maria Masini (Germany) Lisa Ponomar | 6–3, 0–6, [10–3] |
| Loss | 2–7 | Jun 2017 | ITF Antalya, Turkey | W15 | Clay | (Croatia) Ena Kajević | (Romania) Georgia Crăciun (Romania) Ilona Georgiana Ghioroaie | w/o |
| Loss | 2–8 | Jun 2017 | ITF Hammamet, Tunisia | W15 | Clay | (Chile) Fernanda Brito | (Chinese Taipei) Hsieh Yu-chieh (Chinese Taipei) Wu Fang-hsien | 7–5, 3–6, [9–11] |
| Win | 3–8 | Jun 2017 | ITF Hammamet, Tunisia | W15 | Clay | (Chile) Fernanda Brito | (Spain) Lucía de la Puerta Uribe (Spain) Guiomar Maristany | 6–1, 6–3 |
| Loss | 3–9 | Jul 2017 | ITF Getxo, Spain | W25 | Clay | (Spain) Cristina Bucșa | (Venezuela) Andrea Gámiz (Bulgaria) Aleksandrina Naydenova | 2–6, 4–6 |
| Loss | 3–10 | Oct 2017 | ITF Lambaré, Paraguay | W15 | Clay | (Brazil) Thaísa Grana Pedretti | (Chile) Fernanda Brito (Paraguay) Camila Giangreco Campiz | w/o |
| Loss | 3–11 | Nov 2017 | ITF Cúcuta, Colombia | W15 | Clay | (Colombia) Sofía Múnera Sánchez | (United Kingdom) Emily Appleton (Mexico) María Portillo Ramírez | 3–6, 6–7^{(2)} |
| Win | 4–11 | Dec 2017 | ITF Luque, Paraguay | W15 | Hard | (Brazil) Thaísa Grana Pedretti | (Paraguay) Montserrat González (Mexico) Ana Sofía Sánchez | 6–2, 6–4 |
| Win | 5–11 | Aug 2018 | ITF Caslano, Switzerland | W15 | Clay | (Spain) Alba Carrillo Marín | (Italy) Natasha Piludu (Israel) Maya Tahan | 6–4, 6–4 |
| Loss | 5–12 | Nov 2018 | ITF Lousada, Portugal | W15 | Hard (i) | (Spain) Alba Carrillo Marín | (Spain) Olga Parres Azcoitia (Romania) Ioana Loredana Roșca | 2–6, 2–6 |
| Win | 6–12 | Dec 2018 | ITF Solarino, Italy | W15 | Carpet | (France) Lou Adler | (Italy) Maria Masini (Slovenia) Manca Pislak | 2–6, 6–4, [10–6] |
| Win | 7–12 | May 2019 | ITF Cantanhede, Portugal | W15 | Carpet | (Spain) Alba Carrillo Marín | (Portugal) Francisca Jorge (Russia) Anna Ureke | 6–3, 4–6, [10–6] |
| Win | 8–12 | Jun 2019 | ITF Tabarka, Tunisia | W15 | Clay | (Spain) Noelia Bouzó Zanotti | (Russia) Maria Marfutina (Ukraine) Anastasiya Poplavska | 6–0, 6–3 |
| Loss | 8–13 | Jul 2019 | ITF Tabarka, Tunisia | W15 | Clay | (Slovakia) Alica Rusová | (Romania) Ioana Gașpar (Colombia) Yuliana Lizarazo | 5–7, 3–6 |
| Win | 9–13 | Aug 2019 | ITF Santa Cruz, Bolivia | W15 | Clay | (Argentina) Jazmín Ortenzi | (Russia) Elizaveta Koklina (Russia) Anna Morgina | 6–1, 4–6, [11–9] |
| Win | 10–13 | Aug 2019 | ITF La Paz, Bolivia | W15 | Clay | (Argentina) Jazmín Ortenzi | (Peru) Romina Ccuno (Colombia) Antonia Samudio | 6–2, 1–6, [10–4] |
| Win | 11–13 | Aug 2019 | ITF Lambaré, Paraguay | W15 | Clay | (Paraguay) Montserrat González | (Chile) Fernanda Brito (Argentina) Sofía Luini | 6–0, 6–4 |
| Win | 12–13 | Sep 2019 | ITF Tabarka, Tunisia | W15 | Clay | (Germany) Natalia Siedliska | (Italy) Martina Colmegna (Colombia) María Herazo González | 7–5, 6–1 |
| Win | 13–13 | Nov 2019 | ITF Heraklion, Greece | W15 | Clay | (Spain) Noelia Bouzó Zanotti | (Netherlands) Lexie Stevens (Serbia) Draginja Vuković | 6–4, 5–7, [10–6] |
| Loss | 13–14 | Nov 2019 | ITF Heraklion, Greece | W15 | Clay | (Romania) Oana Gavrilă | (Armenia) Ani Amiraghyan (Bulgaria) Julia Stamatova | 1–6, 6–4, [7–10] |
| Loss | 13–15 | Aug 2021 | ITF Monastir, Tunisia | W15 | Hard | (Spain) Noelia Bouzó Zanotti | (France) Tiphanie Lemaître (Lithuania) Akvilė Paražinskaitė | 2–6, 1–6 |
| Loss | 13–16 | Sep 2021 | ITF Monastir, Tunisia | W15 | Hard | (Serbia) Elena Milovanović | (South Korea) Choi Ji-hee (South Korea) Jeong Yeong-won | 4–6, 6–3, [5–10] |
| Win | 14–16 | Nov 2021 | ITF Curitiba, Brazil | W15 | Clay | (Paraguay) Lara Escauriza | (Brazil) Nathaly Kurata (Brazil) Eduarda Piai | 6–3, 6–1 |
| Loss | 14–17 | Feb 2022 | ITF Tucumán, Argentina | W25 | Hard | (Italy) Nicole Fossa Huergo | (Argentina) María Carlé (Argentina) Julieta Estable | 6–3, 0–6, [7–10] |
| Loss | 14–18 | Feb 2022 | ITF Guayaquil, Ecuador | W25 | Hard | (Italy) Nicole Fossa Huergo | (Venezuela) Andrea Gámiz (United States) Sofia Sewing | 4–6, 5–7 |
| Loss | 14–19 | May 2022 | ITF Curitiba, Brazil | W15 | Clay | (Portugal) Ana Filipa Santos | (Argentina) Martina Capurro Taborda (Chile) Fernanda Labraña | 1–6, 4–6 |
| Loss | 14–20 | May 2022 | ITF São Paulo, Brazil | W15 | Clay | (Peru) Romina Ccuno | (Argentina) Martina Capurro Taborda (Chile) Fernanda Labraña | 6–7^{(1)}, 6–3, [7–10] |
| Win | 15–20 | Aug 2022 | ITF Rio de Janeiro, Brazil | W25 | Clay | (Brazil) Thaísa Grana Pedretti | (India) Riya Bhatia (Colombia) María Paulina Pérez | 6–3, 6–1 |
| Loss | 15–21 | Sep 2022 | ITF Santa Margherita di Pula, Italy | W25 | Clay | (Italy) Jennifer Ruggeri | (Italy) Angelica Moratelli (Italy) Camilla Rosatello | 4–6, 4–6 |
| Loss | 15–22 | Jul 2023 | ITF Getxo, Spain | W25 | Clay | (Italy) Nicole Fossa Huergo | (Italy) Diletta Cherubini (Czech Republic) Anna Sisková | 2–6, 4–6 |
| Win | 16–22 | Aug 2023 | ITF Arequipa, Peru | W40 | Clay | (Germany) Natalia Siedliska | (Brazil) Ana Candiotto (Peru) Anastasia Iamachkine | 5–7, 6–2, [10–8] |
| Loss | 16–23 | Jan 2024 | ITF Buenos Aires, Argentina | W35 | Clay | (Argentina) Melany Krywoj | (Italy) Nicole Fossa Huergo (Italy) Miriana Tona | 5–7, 3–6 |
| Loss | 16–24 | Feb 2024 | ITF Tucumán, Argentina | W15 | Clay | (Brazil) Ana Candiotto | (Brazil) Justina González Daniele (Ecuador) Camila Romero | 6–4, 6–7^{(6)}, [8–10] |
| Win | 17–24 | May 2024 | ITF Sopo, Colombia | W35 | Clay | (Mexico) María Portillo Ramírez | (Colombia) Yuliana Lizarazo (Brazil) Rebeca Pereira | 6–4, 6–4 |
| Loss | 17–25 | Jun 2024 | ITF Santo Domingo, Dominican Republic | W15 | Hard | (Mexico) Jessica Hinojosa Gómez | (Mexico) Julia García (United States) Sofía Camila Rojas | 4–6, 6–7^{(6)} |
| Loss | 17–26 | Aug 2024 | ITF Pilar, Argentina | W35 | Clay | (Colombia) María Paulina Pérez | (Spain) Alicia Herrero Liñana (Argentina) Melany Krywoj | 1–6, 3–6 |
| Win | 18–26 | Sep 2024 | ITF Piracicaba, Brazil | W35 | Clay | (Italy) Miriana Tona | (Colombia) María Paulina Pérez (Italy) Aurora Zantedeschi | 5–7, 6–1, [12–10] |
| Win | 19–26 | Sep 2024 | ITF Leme, Brazil | W35 | Clay | (Italy) Miriana Tona | (Brazil) Rebeca Pereira (Ecuador) Camila Romero | 4–6, 6–4, [10–4] |
| Loss | 19–27 | Apr 2025 | ITF Leme, Brazil | W35 | Clay | (Argentina) Luciana Moyano | (Peru) Romina Ccuno (Chile) Fernanda Labraña | 2–6, 5–7 |
| Win | 20–27 | May 2025 | ITF Santo Domingo, Dominican Republic | W35 | Clay | (Italy) Miriana Tona | (Italy) Francesca Pace (Poland) Zuzanna Pawlikowska | 6–0, 6–3 |
| Win | 21–27 | May 2025 | ITF Santo Domingo | W35 | Clay | (Italy) Miriana Tona | (Italy) Francesca Pace (Poland) Zuzanna Pawlikowska | 6–4, 6–3 |
| Win | 22–27 | Jun 2025 | ITF Getxo, Spain | W15 | Clay (i) | (Germany) Joëlle Steur | (Spain) Cayetana Gay (Spain) Isabel Pascual Montalvo | 6–4, 6–2 |
| Loss | 22–28 | Feb 2026 | ITF Orlando, United States | W50 | Hard | (Brazil) Thaísa Grana Pedretti | (Bulgaria) Lia Karatancheva (Ukraine) Anita Sahdiieva | 3–6, 4–6 |
| Win | 23–28 | Jun 2026 | ITF Brasília, Brazil | W15 | Hard | (Ecuador) Camila Romero | (Colombia) María Herazo González (Argentina) Francesca Mattioli | 6–4, 6–1 |
| Win | 24–28 | Jun 2026 | ITF Cuiabá, Brazil | W35 | Clay | (Ecuador) Mell Reasco | (Argentina) Justina María González (Ecuador) Camila Romero | 7–6^{(1)}, 6–3 |
