= Yuliana Lizarazo =

Colombian tennis player (born 1993)

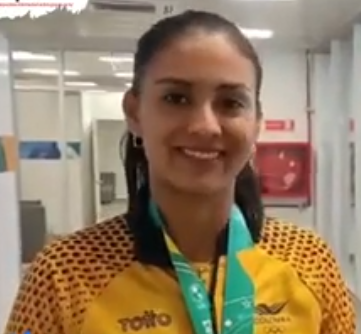
- In a 2023 interview
- Full name: Carol Yuliana Lizarazo Antolinez
- Country (sports): Colombia
- Residence: Barcelona, Spain
- Born: 23 May 1993 (age 33) Cúcuta, Colombia
- Height: 1.75 m (5 ft 9 in)
- Plays: Right (two-handed backhand)
- Prize money: $173,992

Singles
- Career record: 331–220
- Career titles: 11 ITF
- Highest ranking: No. 335 (5 January 2015)
- Current ranking: No. 767 (31 August 2026)

Doubles
- Career record: 214–154
- Career titles: 1 WTA, 19 ITF
- Highest ranking: No. 104 (15 January 2024)
- Current ranking: No. 753 (31 August 2026)

Team competitions
- BJK Cup: 22–21
Medal record
Representing Colombia
Women's tennis
| Event | 1st | 2nd | 3rd |
|---|---|---|---|
| Pan American Games | 1 | 0 | 0 |
| CAC Games | 2 | 2 | 0 |
| South American Games | 1 | 0 | 1 |
| Bolivarian Games | 2 | 1 | 0 |
| Total | 6 | 3 | 1 |
Pan American Games
| Gold medal – first place | 2023 Santiago | Mixed doubles |
Central American and Caribbean Games
| Gold medal – first place | 2023 San Salvador | Doubles |
| Gold medal – first place | 2023 San Salvador | Nations cup |
| Silver medal – second place | 2023 San Salvador | Singles |
| Silver medal – second place | 2026 Santo Domingo | Nations cup |
South American Games
| Gold medal – first place | 2022 Asunción | Doubles |
| Bronze medal – third place | 2022 Asunción | Singles |
Bolivarian Games
| Gold medal – first place | 2022 Valledupar | Singles |
| Gold medal – first place | 2022 Valledupar | Doubles |
| Silver medal – second place | 2025 Lima-Ayacucho | Doubles |
- Last updated on: 7 September 2026.

Carol Yuliana Lizarazo Antolinez (born 23 May 1993) is a Colombian professional tennis player.

On 5 January 2015, she reached her highest WTA singles ranking of No. 335 whilst her best doubles ranking was No. 104 on 15 January 2024. She has won one doubles title on the WTA Tour with eleven singles titles and nineteen doubles titles on the ITF Women's Circuit.

Lizarazo reached her first WTA Tour final at the 2023 Monterrey Open, partnering compatriot María Paulina Pérez. They won their maiden title defeating Kimberly Birrell and Fernanda Contreras Gómez. As a result, Lizarazo moved up 75 positions in the doubles rankings into the top 125.

Partnering Freya Christie, she was runner-up in the doubles at the 2023 Ljubljana Open and 2023 Montevideo Open.

Playing for Colombia Fed Cup team, she has a win–loss record of 22–21 (as of May 2026).

== WTA Tour finals ==
=== Doubles: 1 (title) ===
| Legend WTA 250 (1–0) | Finals by surface Hard (1–0) |

| Result | Date | Tournament | Tier | Surface | Partner | Opponents | Score |
|---|---|---|---|---|---|---|---|
| Win | Mar 2023 | Monterrey Open, Mexico | WTA 250 | Hard | (Colombia) María Paulina Pérez | (Australia) Kimberly Birrell (Mexico) Fernanda Contreras Gómez | 6–3, 5–7, [10–5] |

== WTA 125 finals ==
=== Doubles: 3 (3 runner-ups) ===
| Result | W–L | Date | Tournament | Surface | Partner | Opponents | Score |
|---|---|---|---|---|---|---|---|
| Loss | 0–1 | Aug 2023 | Barranquilla Open, Colombia | Hard | (Colombia) María Paulina Pérez | (Greece) Valentini Grammatikopoulou (Greece) Despina Papamichail | 6–7^{(2–7)}, 5–7 |
| Loss | 0–2 | Sep 2023 | Ljubljana Open, Slovenia | Clay | (United Kingdom) Freya Christie | (Russia) Amina Anshba (United States) Quinn Gleason | 3–6, 4–6 |
| Loss | 0–3 | Dec 2023 | Montevideo Open, Uruguay | Clay | (United Kingdom) Freya Christie | (Argentina) María Lourdes Carlé (Argentina) Julia Riera | 6–7^{(5–7)}, 5–7 |

== ITF Circuit finals ==
=== Singles: 19 (11 titles, 8 runner-ups) ===
| Legend W35 tournaments (1–0) W10/15 tournaments (10–8) | Finals by surface Hard (1–1) Clay (10–7) |

| Result | W–L | Date | Tournament | Tier | Surface | Opponent | Score |
|---|---|---|---|---|---|---|---|
| Loss | 0–1 | Nov 2009 | ITF Bogotá, Colombia | 10k | Clay | (Chile) Andrea Koch Benvenuto | 6–7^{(5)}, 4–6 |
| Win | 1–1 | Nov 2010 | ITF Bogotá, Colombia | 10k | Clay | (United States) Nataly Yoo | 6–1, 7–6^{(1)} |
| Loss | 1–2 | Jan 2011 | ITF Bucaramanga, Colombia | 10k | Clay | (Bulgaria) Aleksandrina Naydenova | 1–6, 2–6 |
| Win | 2–2 | May 2011 | Wiesbaden Open, Germany | 10k | Clay | (Netherlands) Marcella Koek | 6–1, 7–6^{(5)} |
| Win | 3–2 | May 2011 | ITF Båstad, Sweden | 10k | Clay | (Sweden) Hilda Melander | 6–2, 3–6, 6–2 |
| Win | 4–2 | Nov 2011 | ITF Bogotá, Colombia | 10k | Clay | (Colombia) Karen Castiblanco | 4–6, 7–5, 6–4 |
| Loss | 4–3 | Jul 2012 | ITF Viserba, Italy | 10k | Clay | (Italy) Gioia Barbieri | 4–6, 4–6 |
| Win | 5–3 | Aug 2012 | ITF Gardone Val Trompia, Italy | 10k | Clay | (Argentina) Catalina Pella | 7–5, 3–6, 6–4 |
| Loss | 5–4 | Sep 2012 | ITF Bogotá, Colombia | 10k | Clay | (Chile) Cecilia Costa Melgar | 6–1, 3–6, 4–6 |
| Win | 6–4 | May 2014 | ITF Pula, Italy | 10k | Clay | (Switzerland) Tess Sugnaux | 6–2, 6–1 |
| Win | 7–4 | July 2014 | ITF Turin, Italy | 10k | Clay | (Italy) Alice Matteucci | 7–6^{(5)}, 6–3 |
| Loss | 7–5 | May 2016 | ITF Antalya, Turkey | 10k | Hard | (France) Elixane Lechemia | 3–6, 6–3, 4–6 |
| Loss | 7–6 | Nov 2018 | ITF Cúcuta, Colombia | 15k | Clay | (Colombia) Camila Osorio | 3–6, 6–7^{(2)} |
| Loss | 7–7 | Apr 2019 | ITF Guayaquil, Ecuador | W15 | Clay | (Chile) Fernanda Brito | 6–7^{(4)}, 6–4, 5–7 |
| Win | 8–7 | May 2019 | ITF Tacarigua, Trinidad & Tobago | W15 | Hard (i) | (United States) Safiya Carrington | 6–7^{(9)}, 6–3, 6–1 |
| Win | 9–7 | Jul 2019 | ITF Tabarka, Tunisia | W15 | Clay | (Sweden) Louise Brunskog | 6–3, 6–0 |
| Win | 10–7 | Jul 2019 | ITF Schio, Italy | W15 | Clay | (Slovenia) Manca Pislak | 6–4, 7–5 |
| Loss | 10–8 | Sep 2021 | ITF Ibagué, Colombia | W15 | Clay | (Brazil) Thaísa Grana Pedretti | 6–4, 1–1 ret. |
| Win | 11–8 | Apr 2024 | ITF Mosquera, Colombia | W35 | Clay | (Argentina) Jazmín Ortenzi | 6–1, 6–1 |

=== Doubles: 37 (19 titles, 18 runner-ups) ===
| Legend W60/75 tournaments (1–2) W40/50 tournaments (0–2) W25/35 tournaments (2–5) W10/15 tournaments (16–9) | Finals by surface Hard (1–2) Clay (18–14) Carpet (0–2) |

| Result | W–L | Date | Tournament | Tier | Surface | Partner | Opponents | Score |
|---|---|---|---|---|---|---|---|---|
| Loss | 0–1 | Sep 2008 | ITF Bogotá, Colombia | 10k | Clay (i) | (Bulgaria) Aleksandrina Naydenova | (Colombia) Viky Núñez Fuentes (Colombia) Paula-Catalina Robles-García | 3–6, 4–6 |
| Loss | 0–2 | Nov 2009 | ITF Bogotá, Colombia | 10k | Clay | (Colombia) Paula Zabala | (Colombia) Karen Castiblanco (Chile) Andrea Koch Benvenuto | 3–6, 1–6 |
| Win | 1–2 | Nov 2010 | ITF Bogotá, Colombia | 10k | Clay | (Venezuela) Adriana Pérez | (Colombia) Karen Castiblanco (Chile) Andrea Koch Benvenuto | 6–2, 7–6^{(5)} |
| Loss | 1–3 | May 2011 | ITF Båstad, Sweden | 10k | Clay | (Germany) Alina Wessel | (Poland) Olga Brózda (Poland) Natalia Kołat | 6–7^{(7)}, 2–6 |
| Loss | 1–4 | Jul 2011 | ITF Imola, Italy | 25k | Carpet | (Germany) Scarlett Werner | (Italy) Giulia Gatto-Monticone (Italy) Federica Quercia | w/o |
| Win | 2–4 | Sep 2012 | ITF Bogotá, Colombia | 10k | Clay | (Brazil) Laura Pigossi | (United States) Blair Shankle (Colombia) Laura Ucrós | 6–2, 6–2 |
| Loss | 2–5 | Dec 2013 | ITF Duino-Aurisina, Italy | 10k | Clay (i) | (Italy) Anastasia Grymalska | (Italy) Claudia Giovine (Italy) Alice Matteucci | 6–7^{(7)}, 1–6 |
| Win | 3–5 | Jan 2014 | ITF Tinajo, Spain | 10k | Clay | (Italy) Deborah Chiesa | (Spain) Arabela Fernández Rabener (Belgium) Elise Mertens | 6–2, 3–6, [13–11] |
| Win | 4–5 | Feb 2014 | ITF Palma Nova, Spain | 10k | Clay | (Australia) Alexandra Nancarrow | (Netherlands) Anna Katalina Alzate (Serbia) Natalija Kostić | 6–3, 6–4 |
| Win | 5–5 | Mar 2014 | ITF Pula, Italy | 10k | Clay | (Australia) Alexandra Nancarrow | (Italy) Alice Matteucci (Greece) Despina Papamichail | 6–3, 4–6, [11–9] |
| Win | 6–5 | May 2014 | ITF Pula, Italy | 10k | Clay | (Italy) Alice Matteucci | (Argentina) Carla Lucero (Dominican Republic) Francesca Segarelli | 6–1, 7–5 |
| Win | 7–5 | Jul 2014 | ITF Turin, Italy | 10k | Clay | (Italy) Alice Matteucci | (Italy) Georgia Brescia (Switzerland) Lisa Sabino | 6–3, 6–2 |
| Win | 8–5 | May 2015 | ITF Båstad, Sweden | 10k | Clay | (Sweden) Cornelia Lister | (Germany) Carolin Daniels (Germany) Laura Schaeder | 7–5, 5–7, [10–8] |
| Loss | 8–6 | Feb 2016 | ITF Palma Nova, Spain | 10k | Clay | (Italy) Miriana Tona | (Italy) Martina di Giuseppe (Italy) Giorgia Marchetti | 2–6, 4–6 |
| Loss | 8–7 | May 2016 | ITF Antalya, Turkey | 10k | Hard | (Colombia) María Herazo González | (United States) Sarah Lee (United States) Ashley Mackey | 2–6, 6–3, [8–10] |
| Win | 9–7 | May 2016 | ITF Antalya, Turkey | 10k | Hard | (Bosnia and Herzegovina) Anita Husarić | (United Kingdom) Francesca Stephenson (Netherlands) Erika Vogelsang | 4–6, 6–4, [10–3] |
| Loss | 9–8 | Apr 2019 | ITF Bucaramanga, Colombia | W15 | Clay | (Colombia) Antonia Samudio | (Chile) Fernanda Brito (Colombia) María Paulina Pérez | 2–6, 2–6 |
| Win | 10–8 | Jul 2019 | ITF Tabarka, Tunisia | W15 | Clay | (Romania) Ioana Gașpar | (Slovakia) Alica Rusová (Bolivia) Noelia Zeballos | 7–5, 6–3 |
| Win | 11–8 | Jul 2019 | ITF Tabarka, Tunisia | W15 | Clay | (Argentina) Martina Capurro Taborda | (Netherlands) Diana Chehoudi (Netherlands) Noa Liauw A Fong | 6–2, 6–1 |
| Win | 12–8 | Jul 2019 | ITF Schio, Italy | W15 | Clay | (Italy) Aurora Zantedeschi | (Italy) Matilde Paoletti (Italy) Lisa Pigato | 6–3, 1–6, [10–5] |
| Loss | 12–9 | Aug 2019 | ITF Guayaquil, Ecuador | W25 | Clay | (Colombia) Camila Osorio | (United States) Katerina Stewart (Romania) Gabriela Talabă | 7–6^{(1)}, 6–7^{(6)}, [7–10] |
| Win | 13–9 | Feb 2020 | ITF Antalya, Turkey | W15 | Clay | (Italy) Aurora Zantedeschi | (China) Guo Meiqi (China) Han Jiangxue | 6–2, 5–7, [10–4] |
| Loss | 13–10 | Mar 2020 | ITF Antalya, Turkey | W15 | Clay | (Colombia) María Herazo González | (Kazakhstan) Gozal Ainitdinova (Georgia (country)) Zoziya Kardava | 7–6^{(4)}, 6–7^{(1)}, [10–12] |
| Win | 14–10 | Sep 2020 | ITF Trieste, Italy | W15 | Clay | (Italy) Aurora Zantedeschi | (Italy) Melania Delai (Italy) Lisa Pigato | 6–2, 6–3 |
| Win | 15–10 | Feb 2021 | ITF Antalya, Turkey | W15 | Clay | (Colombia) María Herazo González | (Bulgaria) Petia Arshinkova (Bulgaria) Gergana Topalova | 6–2, 6–1 |
| Loss | 15–11 | Feb 2021 | ITF Antalya, Turkey | W15 | Clay | (Colombia) María Herazo González | (Romania) Cristina Dinu (Slovakia) Chantal Škamlová | 1–6, 3–6 |
| Loss | 15–12 | Aug 2021 | ITF Bydgoszcz, Poland | W25 | Clay | (Japan) Hiroko Kuwata | (Brazil) Carolina Alves (Belarus) Iryna Shymanovich | 1–6, 6–3, [5–10] |
| Loss | 15–13 | Jul 2022 | Internazionali di Cordenons, Italy | W60 | Clay | (Italy) Aurora Zantedeschi | (Italy) Angelica Moratelli (Netherlands) Eva Vedder | 3–6, 2–6 |
| Win | 16–13 | Oct 2022 | ITF Ibagué, Colombia | W25 | Clay | (Colombia) María Paulina Pérez | (Colombia) María Herazo González (United States) Sofia Sewing | 6–4, 7–5 |
| Loss | 16–14 | Jan 2023 | ITF Buenos Aires, Argentina | W25 | Clay | (Colombia) María Paulina Pérez | (Russia) Amina Anshba (Ukraine) Valeriya Strakhova | 6–1, 4–6, [7–10] |
| Loss | 16–15 | Feb 2023 | ITF Mexico City, Mexico | W40 | Hard | (Colombia) María Paulina Pérez | (Greece) Despina Papamichail (Cyprus) Raluca Șerban | 6–3, 4–6, [4–10] |
| Loss | 16–16 | Jul 2023 | ITF Roma, Italy | W60 | Clay | (Colombia) María Paulina Pérez | (Russia) Yuliya Hatouka (Kazakhstan) Zhibek Kulambayeva | 4–6, 4–6 |
| Loss | 16–17 | May 2024 | ITF Sopo, Colombia | W35 | Clay | (Brazil) Rebeca Pereira | (Mexico) María Portillo Ramírez (Bolivia) Noelia Zeballos | 4–6, 4–6 |
| Win | 17–17 | Jun 2024 | ITF Caserta, Italy | W75 | Clay | (Greece) Despina Papamichail | (United Kingdom) Ali Collins (Colombia) María Paulina Pérez | 4–6, 6–3, [10–3] |
| Loss | 17–18 | Aug 2024 | ITF Oldenzaal, Netherlands | W50 | Clay | (United Kingdom) Freya Christie | (Russia) Polina Kudermetova (Russia) Ekaterina Makarova | 4–6, 6–1, [7–10] |
| Win | 18–18 | May 2025 | ITF Båstad, Sweden | W35 | Clay | (Colombia) María Paulina Pérez | (Russia) Anastasia Tikhonova (Sweden) Lisa Zaar | 6–3, 6–2 |
| Win | 19–18 | Sep 2025 | ITF Fiano Romano, Italy | W15 | Clay | (Argentina) Maria Florencia Urrutia | (Germany) Laura Böhner (Germany) Eva Marie Voracek | 6–0, 6–4 |
