= María Herazo González =

Colombian tennis player (born 1997)

- Full name: María Fernanda Herazo González
- Country (sports): Colombia
- Born: 22 March 1997 (age 29) Barranquilla, Colombia
- Height: 1.67 m (5 ft 6 in)
- Plays: Left (two-handed backhand)
- Prize money: $184,158

Singles
- Career record: 349–282
- Career titles: 12 ITF
- Highest ranking: No. 317 (24 September 2018)
- Current ranking: No. 762 (14 September 2026)

Doubles
- Career record: 316–219
- Career titles: 27 ITF
- Highest ranking: No. 182 (9 October 2023)
- Current ranking: No. 571 (14 September 2026)

Team competitions
- BJK Cup: 12–15
Medal record
Women's tennis
Representing Colombia
Event	1st	2nd	3rd
Pan American Games	0	1	0
CAC Games	3	0	0
South American Games	2	0	0
Bolivarian Games	1	1	2
Total	6	2	2
Pan American Games
Silver medal – second place	2023 Santiago	Doubles
Central American and Caribbean Games
Gold medal – first place	2018 Barranquilla	Team
Gold medal – first place	2023 San Salvador	Singles
Gold medal – first place	2023 San Salvador	Nations Cup
South American Games
Gold medal – first place	2022 Asunción	Singles
Gold medal – first place	2022 Asunción	Doubles
Bolivarian Games
Gold medal – first place	2022 Valledupar	Doubles
Gold medal – first place	2017 Santa Marta	Singles
Silver medal – second place	2017 Santa Marta	Team
Bronze medal – third place	2013 Trujillo	Doubles
Bronze medal – third place	2013 Trujillo	Nations Cup
- Last updated on: 20 September 2026.

María Fernanda Herazo González (Latin American Spanish: [maˈɾi.a feɾˈnanda eˈɾaso]; born 22 March 1997) is a Colombian professional tennis player. Known as "Mafe" and "The People's Champion", she has won 12 singles and 27 doubles titles on the Women's World Tennis Tour. With 39 titles, she is the most successful professional tournament winner in the history of Colombian tennis, surpassing figures such as Fabiola Zuluaga and Mariana Duque. She began her sports career at the age of 12. On 24 September 2018, she reached her best singles ranking of world No. 317. On 9 October 2023, she peaked at No. 182 in the WTA doubles rankings.

Herazo González has won titles on several continents: South America, North America, Europe, Africa and Asia, and on multiple surfaces, including clay, hard and carpet. She has won a total of eleven medals in events of the Olympic cycle (seven gold, two silver and two bronze) being the Colombian tennis player with the highest number of gold medals in these events. Her gold medals are: Central American and Caribbean Games San Salvador 2023 (singles and Nations Cup); South American Games Asunción 2022 (singles and doubles); Central American and Caribbean Games Barranquilla 2018 (Nations Cup); Bolivarian Games Santa Marta 2017 (singles); and Bolivarian Games Valledupar 2022 (doubles).

Playing for the Colombia Fed Cup team, Herazo González has a win-loss record of 12–15. She contributed to the team's promotion to the play-offs, competed as the number-one player in both singles and doubles, and publicly resigned from the team in 2024 following disagreements with the Colombian Tennis Federation.

She is also the Colombian tennis player with the most wins in professional matches against players of her own nationality: between 2012 and 2026 she played 31 matches against compatriots, with a 29–2 record (93.5% effectiveness), remaining unbeaten against prominent Colombian players such as Camila Osorio and Yuliana Lizarazo, with approximately 86% of sets won and 24 straight-set victories.

Throughout her career, Herazo has recorded 49 victories over players who reached the elite level of world tennis by attaining a top-100 position in the WTA rankings, in either singles or doubles. This record comprises 21 singles victories and 28 doubles victories, achieved in professional tour events and while representing Colombia in international multi-sport competitions.

Herazo González has made several appearances at WTA tournaments; her most notable appearances include the WTA 1000 in Guadalajara, WTA 500 in San Diego, WTA 250 in Bogotá, WTA 125 in Barranquilla, WTA 125 in Cali, WTA 125 in Colina-Chile, and the WTA 125 in San Luis Potosí. In her home country, she was at the 2022 Copa Colsanitas, where she lost in the first round to third seed Rebecca Peterson, while she also fell at the opening stage at the 2023 Copa Oster, this time to Valeriya Strakhova.

She defeated defending champion Panna Udvardy to reach the second round of the 2023 Barranquilla Open, where she lost to Irina Fetecău. At the 2024 Barranquilla Open, Herazo González was defeated in round one by top seed Tatjana Maria.

== Career ==
María Fernanda Herazo González has won twelve singles titles and twenty-seven doubles titles on the ITF Women's World Tennis Tour, reaching finals on clay, hard and carpet courts across South America, North America, Europe, Africa and Asia. She also reached semifinals of WTA tournaments, in both the WTA 250 and WTA 125 categories.

She reached world No. 39 on the junior circuit, where she played Roland Garros, the US Open and Wimbledon. Additionally, she represented Colombia at the Youth Olympic Games held in Nanjing, China, in 2014.

Playing for Colombia in the Fed Cup/Billie Jean King Cup, Herazo finished her participation with a record of 12 wins and 15 losses. She represents Colombia in team competitions and is a gold medalist in Olympic Cycle events: Bolivarian Games, Central American and Caribbean Games, and South American Games, at the individual and doubles levels.

=== 2025 and 2026 seasons ===
In October 2025 she won, together with Dasha Ivanova, the W15 in Santa Tecla and reached 38 professional titles, surpassing Mariana Duque's mark of 37 and taking the lead of the Colombian record for titles on the professional circuit. In 2026 she won her twenty-seventh ITF doubles title by winning the W15 in Hurghada together with Federica Sacco. The following week, the pair reached another final, this time at the W35 in Hurghada, where she was runner-up after falling to Elina Nepliy and Mariia Tkacheva 3–6, 2–6.

== Education ==
Herazo is studying Social Communication at the National Open and Distance University (UNAD) and has expressed interest in sports journalism.

== Injuries ==
Throughout her professional career, María Fernanda Herazo has faced various injuries that have conditioned some periods of her competitive activity.

One of her main physical antecedents has been a serious condition of the spine. At the age of 18 she was diagnosed with two disc herniations at levels L4-L5 and L5-S1, the result of a gym accident during her sports training, which would condition her entire sports career from then on. The neurosurgery service considered that she might not walk again and advised against returning to regular tennis play; however, Herazo continued her sports career with occasional flare-ups of the lumbar condition.

In 2019 she suffered an elbow injury while seeking qualification for the Lima Pan American Games. The injury affected her preparation and performance at the Games; she subsequently required a period of suspension from sports activity before returning to the circuit.

Starting in 2021 she incorporated into her team physician Andrés Felipe Estupiñán Bohórquez, a master's in sports medicine, whom she has considered a fundamental piece to continue her sports process.

At the end of 2024 she suffered a left wrist injury from a fall on a court in poor conditions during a match in Argentina. Herazo continued competing and aggravated her injury; she later completed her recovery process with the support of the Colombian Olympic Committee and its health staff. In the process, physicians Andrés Estupiñán and Rodrigo Laverde were the main pieces of her rehabilitation. In May 2025 she stated that she had recovered from the injury and, in 2026, she was once again in physical condition to compete.

Despite these antecedents, her determination and ability to overcome various injury periods have allowed her to maintain her professional career and continue competing on the international circuit.

== Advocacy for athletes' rights ==
María Fernanda Herazo has spoken publicly about athletes' rights and various aspects of the management and structure of Colombian tennis, gaining relevance both for her sports results and for her role in advocacy and defense of athletes. She has publicly questioned the support criteria, transparency and planning of Colombian women's tennis, and has been involved in controversies with the Colombian Tennis Federation (FCT) over athletes' rights, particularly after her resignation from the Colombia team in 2024.

In a second-instance ruling of 17 October 2025, the Forty-Ninth Criminal Circuit Court with Knowledge Function of Bogotá reversed the first-instance decision, protected Herazo's rights to honor and good name, and ordered the Federation to remove her name from the 19 November 2024 statement. Herazo publicly disseminated the decision. She also publicly questioned statements by Mauricio Lederman, president of the FCT, made in an interview with tennis businessman Jhan Fontalvo, whom she described as controversial, and interpreted them as an attempt at intimidation. The tennis player framed the conflict in a broader context: the autonomy of athletes, recognition based on sports merits, questioning bureaucracy, and the possibility of disagreeing with the decisions of the organizations that administer Colombian sport.

Herazo has also publicly defended her independence in managing her career. Among her professional decisions, she declined an invitation to the WTA 250 in Bogotá in 2024 and to participate in the Nadal vs. Ruud tennis exhibition in order to prioritize her sports calendar. In 2026 she declined an invitation to the main draw of the WTA 125 in Barranquilla, which was communicated to her when she was already competing in Egypt. In 2026 she expanded her questions about the development of Colombian women's tennis, expressing concern about the competitive structure, generational renewal and the development processes of female players, raising a debate about the institutional conditions for the development of Colombian tennis players.

Her pronouncements also consolidated a facet of leadership and recognition off the courts linked to the defense of athletes' rights, professional autonomy and the search for more equitable conditions in sport. This dimension of her career has complemented her competitive career and reinforced her profile as an athlete willing to actively participate in the institutional debates that affect athletes.

== María Fernanda Herazo Stadium ==
The María Fernanda Herazo District Racket Park (Spanish: Parque Distrital de Raquetas María Fernanda Herazo), also known as the María Fernanda Herazo Tennis Stadium, is the main tennis complex in Barranquilla, Colombia. Located in the Buenavista sector, at 100th Street with 52C Race, it has a stadium court and multiple tennis and racquetball courts, and is the regular home of the Atlántico Tennis League.

The venue has borne Herazo's name since 2018: during the opening ceremony of the 2018 Central American and Caribbean Games in Barranquilla, the city government informed the tennis player of the decision to name the stadium after her, an honor she has described as a moment that marked her forever. With this, Herazo became one of the Colombian sportswomen with a stadium named after her in life.

The stadium has hosted top-level international events. In April 2018 it received the Americas Zone Davis Cup tie between Colombia and Brazil, in which Alejandro González defeated Joao Pedro Sorgi and qualified the country for the world group. It also hosts the WTA 125 in Barranquilla (Kia Open), played on its courts consecutively since 2024 with a 32-player main draw; in the 2024 edition, Herazo was doubles semifinalist in her home city. In addition, the venue has received the Barranquilla Challenger, a men's professional tournament held in the city since 2011, and, at the junior level, the Barranquilla J300 Cup, considered one of the most important junior tournaments in Colombia.

== Performance timeline ==
Key
W	F	SF	QF	#R	RR	Q#	DNQ	A	NH

(W) winner; (F) finalist; (SF) semifinalist; (QF) quarterfinalist; (#R) rounds 4, 3, 2, 1; (RR) round-robin stage; (Q#) qualification round; (DNQ) did not qualify; (A) absent; (NH) not held; (SR) strike rate (events won / competed); (W–L) win–loss record.
To avoid confusion and double counting, these charts are updated at the conclusion of a tournament or when the player's participation has ended.

== ITF Circuit finals ==
=== Singles: 17 (12 titles, 5 runner-ups) ===
Legend $25,000 tournaments $10/15,000 tournaments	Finals by surface Hard (2–0) Clay (10–5)

Result	W–L	Date	Tournament	Tier	Surface	Opponent	Score
Win	1–0	Dec 2013	ITF Barranquilla, Colombia	10k	Clay	(Chile) Andrea Koch Benvenuto	6–4, 6–2
Win	2–0	May 2016	ITF Antalya, Turkey	10k	Hard	(Canada) Marie-Alexandre Leduc	6–3, 4–6, 2–1 ret.
Win	3–0	Oct 2016	ITF Pereira, Colombia	10k	Clay	(Colombia) Emiliana Arango	6–3, 6–2
Loss	3–1	Oct 2016	ITF Cúcuta, Colombia	10k	Clay	(Chile) Fernanda Brito	6–4, 4–6, 1–6
Loss	3–2	Apr 2017	ITF Cairo, Egypt	15k	Clay	(Belgium) Hélène Scholsen	6–4, 2–6, 2–6
Win	4–2	Sep 2017	ITF Hammamet, Tunisia	15k	Clay	(Romania) Irina Fetecău	1–6, 7–5, 6–2
Win	5–2	Nov 2017	ITF Pereira, Colombia	15k	Clay	(United Kingdom) Emily Appleton	7–5, 7–5
Win	6–2	Nov 2017	ITF Cúcuta, Colombia	15k	Clay	(United States) Anastasia Nefedova	6–2, 6–2
Win	7–2	Dec 2017	ITF Manta, Ecuador	15k	Clay	(Guatemala) Andrea Weedon	6–3, 6–0
Win	8–2	May 2018	ITF Antalya, Turkey	15k	Clay	(Japan) Haruna Arakawa	6–4, 6–1
Loss	8–3	Jun 2021	ITF Antalya, Turkey	W15	Clay	(Spain) Rosa Vicens Mas	1–6, 2–6
Win	9–3	Nov 2021	ITF Cundinamarca, Colombia	W15	Clay (i)	(United States) Hurricane Tyra Black	7–6^{(5)}, 3–6, 7–6^{(4)}
Win	10–3	Dec 2021	ITF Santo Domingo, Dominican Republic	W15	Hard	(United States) Chanelle Van Nguyen	6–4, 6–4
Loss	10–4	Sep 2022	ITF Guayaquil, Ecuador	W15	Clay	(United States) Sofia Sewing	6–4, 3–6, 2–6
Win	11–4	Oct 2022	ITF Guayaquil, Ecuador	W15	Clay	(United States) Sofia Sewing	6–4, 6–3
Win	12–4	Oct 2022	ITF Ibagué, Colombia	W25	Clay	(Brazil) Gabriela Cé	6–3, 6–3
Loss	12–5	Nov 2022	ITF Lima, Peru	W15	Clay	(United States) Sofia Sewing	6–7^{(3)}, 1–6

=== Doubles: 60 (27 titles, 33 runner-ups) ===
Legend W60/75 tournaments W25/35 tournaments W10/15 tournaments	Finals by surface Hard (8–8) Clay (18–24) Carpet (1–1)

Result	W–L	Date	Tournament	Tier	Surface	Partner	Opponents	Score
Win	1–0	Jun 2013	ITF Breda, Netherlands	10k	Clay	(Colombia) María Paulina Pérez	(Belgium) Elke Lemmens (Belarus) Sviatlana Pirazhenka	1–6, 7–6^{(2)}, [12–10]
Loss	1–1	Nov 2013	ITF Lima, Peru	10k	Clay	(Argentina) Daniela Farfán	(Mexico) Ana Sofía Sánchez (Dominican Republic) Francesca Segarelli	6–0, 4–6, [8–10]
Loss	1–2	Nov 2013	ITF Bogotá, Colombia	10k	Clay	(Hungary) Naomi Totka	(Chile) Andrea Koch Benvenuto (United States) Daniella Roldan	1–6, 4–6
Win	2–2	Oct 2014	ITF Pereira, Colombia	10k	Clay	(United Kingdom) Anna Brogan	(Venezuela) Mariaryeni Gutiérrez (United States) Alexandra Valenstein	6–3, 6–2
Win	3–2	Nov 2014	ITF Bogotá, Colombia	10k	Clay	(United Kingdom) Anna Brogan	(Argentina) Victoria Bosio (United States) Daniella Roldan	5–7, 6–4, [10–7]
Loss	3–3	Nov 2015	ITF Pereira, Colombia	10k	Clay	(United States) Danielle Roldan	(Romania) Jaqueline Cristian (Brazil) Laura Pigossi	5–7, 3–6
Loss	3–4	Mar 2016	ITF São José do Rio Preto, Brazil	10k	Clay	(Bolivia) Noelia Zeballos	(Brazil) Carolina Alves (Paraguay) Camila Giangreco Campiz	3–6, 4–6
Loss	3–5	May 2016	ITF Antalya, Turkey	10k	Hard	(Colombia) Yuliana Lizarazo	(United States) Sarah Lee (United States) Ashley Mackey	2–6, 6–3, [8–10]
Win	4–5	Jul 2016	ITF Schio, Italy	10k	Clay	(Chile) Bárbara Gatica	(Italy) Alice Balducci (Italy) Deborah Chiesa	7–5, 1–6, [10–5]
Loss	4–6	Aug 2016	ITF Medellín, Colombia	10k	Clay	(Argentina) Carla Lucero	(Chile) Fernanda Brito (Paraguay) Camila Giangreco Campiz	4–6, 2–6
Win	5–6	Jan 2017	ITF Antalya, Turkey	15k	Clay	(Ukraine) Kateryna Sliusar	(Russia) Olesya Pervushina (Russia) Aleksandra Pospelova	7–5, 1–6, [10–5]
Win	6–6	May 2017	ITF Cairo, Egypt	15k	Clay	(Belgium) Magali Kempen	(India) Sowjanya Bavisetti (India) Rishika Sunkara	6–1, 6–2
Loss	6–7	Jun 2017	Figueira da Foz Open, Portugal	25k	Hard	(Mexico) Victoria Rodríguez	(Turkey) Ayla Aksu (Romania) Raluca Șerban	4–6, 1–6
Loss	6–8	Sep 2017	ITF Hammamet, Tunisia	15k	Clay	(Argentina) Victoria Bosio	(Algeria) Inès Ibbou (Italy) Isabella Tcherkes Zade	1–6, 4–6
Win	7–8	Sep 2017	ITF Hammamet, Tunisia	15k	Clay	(Argentina) Victoria Bosio	(Belgium) Lara Salden (Belgium) Chelsea Vanhoutte	6–4, 6–3
Win	8–8	Nov 2017	ITF Pereira, Colombia	15k	Clay	(United Kingdom) Emily Appleton	(The Bahamas) Kerrie Cartwright (United States) Kariann Pierre-Louis	7–5, 2–6, [10–7]
Loss	8–9	Dec 2017	ITF Manta, Ecuador	15k	Clay	(United Kingdom) Emily Appleton	(Mexico) María Portillo Ramírez (United States) Sofia Sewing	1–6, 3–6
Loss	8–10	Jun 2018	ITF Périgueux, France	25k	Clay	(Spain) Cristina Bucșa	(Greece) Eleni Kordolaimi (France) Elixane Lechemia	4–6, 6–3, [9–11]
Win	9–10	Sep 2018	Open de Saint-Malo, France	60k	Clay	(Spain) Cristina Bucșa	(Romania) Alexandra Cadanțu (Latvia) Diāna Marcinkēviča	4–6, 6–1, [10–8]
Loss	9–11	May 2019	ITF Óbidos, Portugal	W25	Carpet	(Italy) Martina Colmegna	(Georgia (country)) Sofia Shapatava (United Kingdom) Emily Webley-Smith	3–6, 0–6
Loss	9–12	Jun 2019	ITF Périgueux, France	W25	Clay	(Latvia) Diāna Marcinkēviča	(Chile) Bárbara Gatica (Brazil) Rebeca Pereira	4–6, 2–6
Loss	9–13	Sep 2019	ITF Tabarka, Tunisia	W15	Clay	(Italy) Martina Colmegna	(Germany) Natalia Siedliska (Bolivia) Noelia Zeballos	5–7, 1–6
Win	10–13	Sep 2019	ITF Tabarka, Tunisia	W15	Clay	(Italy) Martina Colmegna	(Russia) Anna Pribylova (Bulgaria) Julia Stamatova	6–3, 6–1
Loss	10–14	Mar 2020	ITF Antalya, Turkey	W15	Clay	(Colombia) Yuliana Lizarazo	(Kazakhstan) Gozal Ainitdinova (Georgia (country)) Zoziya Kardava	7–6^{(4)}, 6–7^{(1)}, [10–12]
Win	11–14	Feb 2021	ITF Antalya, Turkey	W15	Clay	(Colombia) Yuliana Lizarazo	(Bulgaria) Petia Arshinkova (Bulgaria) Gergana Topalova	6–2, 6–1
Loss	11–15	Feb 2021	ITF Antalya, Turkey	W15	Clay	(Colombia) Yuliana Lizarazo	(Romania) Cristina Dinu (Slovakia) Chantal Škamlová	1–6, 3–6
Win	12–15	Sep 2021	Open Medellín, Colombia	W25	Clay	(Brazil) Laura Pigossi	(United States) Rasheeda McAdoo (Mexico) Victoria Rodríguez	6–2, 7–5
Win	13–15	Oct 2021	ITF Guayaquil, Ecuador	W25	Clay	(Colombia) María Paulina Pérez	(Bosnia and Herzegovina) Dea Herdželaš (Mexico) Victoria Rodríguez	6–3, 4–6, [10–7]
Loss	13–16	Dec 2021	ITF Santo Domingo, Dominican Republic	W15	Hard	(Colombia) María Paulina Pérez	(United States) Dasha Ivanova (United States) Chanelle Van Nguyen	4–6, 3–6
Win	14–16	Dec 2021	ITF Santo Domingo, Dominican Republic	W15	Hard	(Colombia) María Paulina Pérez	(United States) Paris Corley (Slovakia) Ingrid Vojčináková	7–6^{(4)}, 3–6, [12–10]
Loss	14–17	Mar 2022	ITF Salinas, Ecuador	W25	Hard	(Colombia) María Paulina Pérez	(Chile) Bárbara Gatica (Brazil) Rebeca Pereira	4–6, 0–6
Loss	14–18	Sep 2022	ITF Guayaquil, Ecuador	W15	Clay	(Peru) Romina Ccuno	(Colombia) María Paulina Pérez (United States) Sofia Sewing	4–6, 6–1, [2–10]
Win	15–18	Oct 2022	ITF Guayaquil, Ecuador	W15	Clay	(Peru) Romina Ccuno	(Colombia) María Paulina Pérez (United States) Sofia Sewing	6–2, 5–7, [11–9]
Loss	15–19	Oct 2022	ITF Ibagué, Colombia	W25	Clay	(United States) Sofia Sewing	(Colombia) María Paulina Pérez (Colombia) Yuliana Lizarazo	4–6, 5–7
Win	16–19	Nov 2022	ITF Lima, Peru	W15	Clay	(Peru) Romina Ccuno	(Peru) Leslie Espinoza Gamarra (Peru) Anastasia Iamachkine	6–1, 6–3
Loss	16–20	Jan 2023	ITF Buenos Aires, Argentina	W25	Clay	(Peru) Romina Ccuno	(Ukraine) Valeriya Strakhova; Amina Anshba	1–6, 2–6
Win	17–20	Feb 2023	ITF Tucumán, Argentina	W25	Clay	(Netherlands) Lexie Stevens	(Australia) Seone Mendez (Latvia) Daniela Vismane	2–6, 6–3, [10–8]
Loss	17–21	May 2023	Open Saint-Gaudens, France	W60	Clay	(United States) Adriana Reami	(Russia) Sofya Lansere (Czech Republic) Anna Sisková	0–6, 6–3, [6–10]
Win	18–21	Jun 2023	ITF Santo Domingo, Dominican Republic	W25	Clay	Ksenia Laskutova	(Mexico) Ana Sofía Sánchez (Mexico) Yuliia Starodubtseva	2–6, 6–4, [11–9]
Win	19–21	Jul 2023	ITF Don Benito, Spain	W25	Carpet	(Peru) Anastasia Iamachkine	(Spain) Lucía Cortez Llorca (Spain) Olga Parres Azcoitia	7–6^{(8)}, 6–3
Win	20–21	Sep 2023	Berkeley Club Challenge, US	W60	Hard	(United States) Jessie Aney	(Australia) Elysia Bolton (Australia) Alexandra Bozovic	7–5, 7–5
Loss	20–22	Oct 2023	ITF Redding, United States	W25	Hard	(Canada) Kayla Cross	(United States) Liv Hovde (United States) Clervie Ngounoue	3–6, 5–7
Loss	20–23	Apr 2024	ITF Hammamet, Tunisia	W35	Clay	(Australia) Kayla McPhee	(Czech Republic) Julie Štruplová; Ksenia Zaytseva	6–4, 4–6, [4–10]
Loss	20–24	May 2024	ITF Hammamet, Tunisia	W35	Clay	(France) Yasmine Mansouri	(Spain) Kaitlin Quevedo (Japan) Ikumi Yamazaki	3–6, 6–7^{(5)}
Win	21–24	May 2024	ITF Monastir, Tunisia	W15	Hard	(South Korea) Back Da-yeon	(Japan) Natsuho Arakawa (China) Zhang Ying	6–4, 6–4
Win	22–24	Jun 2024	ITF Madrid, Spain	W15	Clay	(Italy) Francesca Pace	(Italy) Diletta Cherubini (Germany) Carolina Kuhl	6–3, 7–5
Loss	22–25	May 2025	ITF Kuršumlijska Banja, Serbia	W35	Clay	(Serbia) Draginja Vuković	(Russia) Arina Bulatova (Russia) Ekaterina Kazionova	3–6, 6–7^{(4)}
Loss	22–26	Jun 2025	ITF Kuršumlijska Banja	W15	Clay	(Spain) Ana Giraldi Requena	(Argentina) Julieta Lara Estable (Argentina) María Florencia Urrutia	1–6, 7–6^{(3)}, [5–10]
Win	23–26	Jun 2025	ITF Kayseri, Turkiye	W15	Hard	(Latvia) Adelina Lachinova	(China) Liu Min; Edda Mamedova	4–6, 7–5, [10–5]
Win	24–26	Jun 2025	ITF Kayseri, Turkiye	W15	Hard	(United Kingdom) Esther Adeshina	(Germany) Anastasiya Kuparev (Switzerland) Ayline Samardžić	6–0, 7–6^{(3)}
Loss	24–27	Aug 2025	ITF Ankara, Turkiye	W15	Hard	(Ukraine) Anastasiya Zaparyniuk	(Russia) Maria Golovina (Slovakia) Katarína Kužmová	5–7, 6–3, [4–10]
Win	25–27	Sep 2025	ITF Kayseri, Turkiye	W15	Hard	(Australia) Alana Subasic	(Bulgaria) Dia Evtimova (Germany) Vivien Sandberg	6–7^{(4)}, 6–2, [11–9]
Win	26–27	Sep 2025	ITF Santa Tecla, El Salvador	W15	Hard	(United States) Dasha Ivanova	(France) Sophia Biolay (France) Jade Bornay	6–4, 7–5
Loss	26–28	Oct 2025	ITF Santa Tecla, El Salvador	W15	Hard	(Netherlands) Merel Hoedt	(Mexico) Jéssica Hinojosa Gómez (Mexico) Fernanda Navarro	5–7, 6–2, [7–10]
Loss	26–29	Jun 2026	ITF Brasília, Brazil	W15	Hard	(Argentina) Francesca Mattioli	(Ecuador) Camila Romero (Bolivia) Noelia Zeballos	4–6, 1–6
Loss	26–30	Aug 2026	ITF Kuršumlijska Banja, Serbia	W15	Clay	(United States) Mia Horvit	Felitsata Dorofeeva-Rybas; Varvara Panshina	6–4, 6–7^{(3)}, [4–10]
Win	27–30	Sep 2026	ITF Hurghada, Egypt	W15	Hard	(Italy) Federica Sacco	(Egypt) Yasmin Ezzat (France) Laïa Petretic	6–4, 6–3
Loss	27–31	Sep 2026	ITF Hurghada, Egypt	W35	Hard	(Italy) Federica Sacco	Elina Nepliy (Russia) Mariia Tkacheva	3–6, 2–6
loss	27-32	Sep 2026	ITF Constanta, Romania	W15	Clay	(Czech Republic) Linda Sevcikova	(Romania) Alesia Breaz (Romania) Cristina Todoni	6-3, 2-6, [4-10]
Loss	27–33	Oct 2026	ITF Heraklion, Greece	W35	Clay	(Romania) Simona Ogescu	(Greece) Elena Korokozidi (Germany) Eva Marie Voracek	3–6, 6–3, [9–11]
