= Mell Reasco =

Ecuadorian tennis player (born 2002)

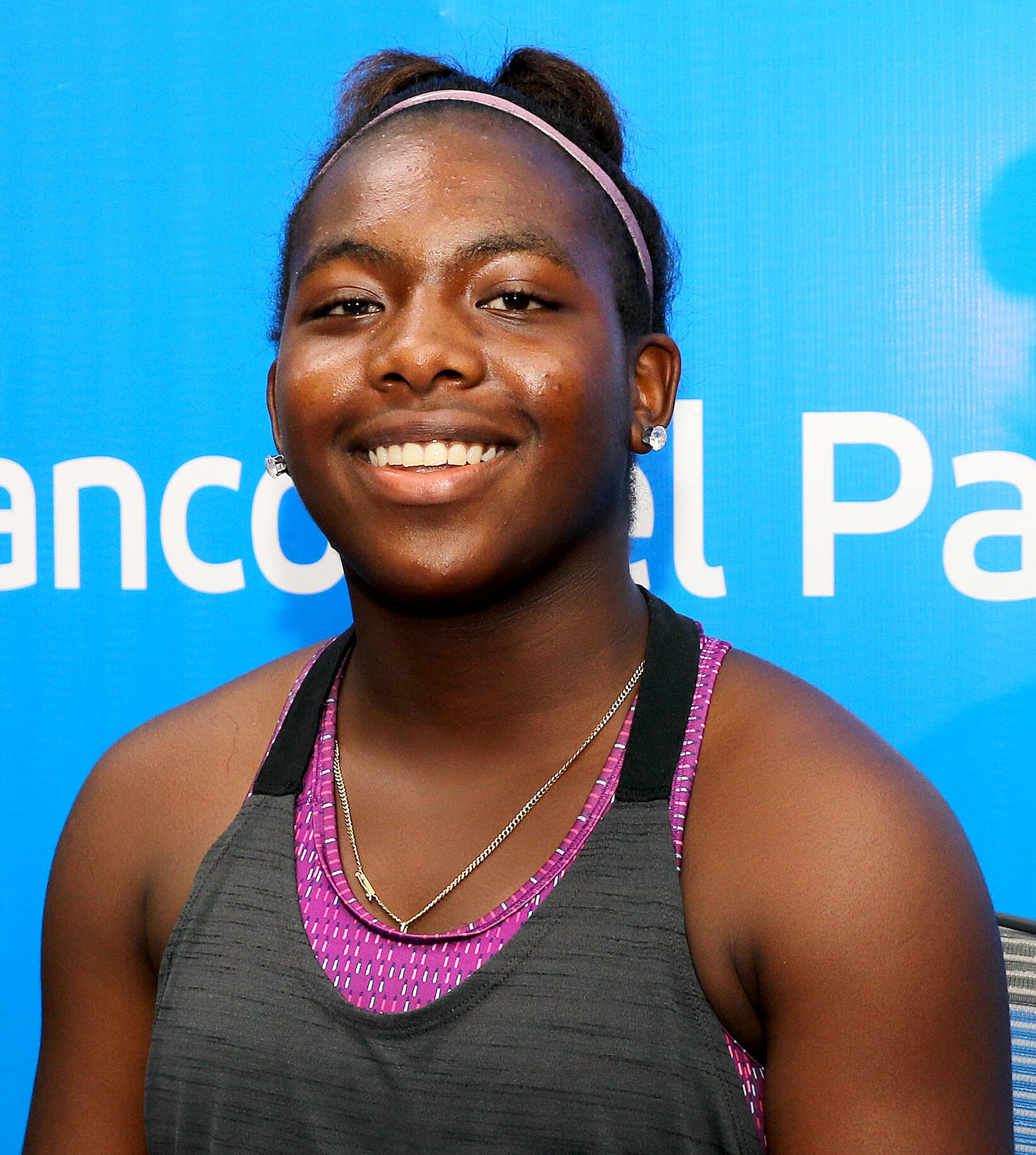
- Reasco in 2017
- Full name: Mell Elizabeth Reasco González
- Country (sports): Ecuador
- Born: 23 July 2002 (age 24) Ecuador
- Plays: Left (two-handed backhand)
- Prize money: $70,394

Singles
- Career record: 146–84
- Career titles: 2 ITF
- Highest ranking: No. 328 (27 July 2026)
- Current ranking: No. 350 (28 September 2026)

Doubles
- Career record: 56–36
- Career titles: 6 ITF
- Highest ranking: No. 212 (21 September 2026)
- Current ranking: No. 218 (28 September 2026)

Team competitions
- Fed Cup: 12–11
- Last updated on: 29 September 2026.

Mell Elizabeth Reasco González (Note: In this Spanish name, the first or paternal surname is Reasco and the second or maternal family name is González.) (born 23 July 2002) is an Ecuadorian tennis player.

== Career ==
Reasco reached a career-high ITF juniors ranking of 20, achieved on 24 February 2020.

She has won two singles titles and six doubles titles on the ITF Women's World Tennis Tour. On 27 July 2026, she recorded her career-high singles ranking of world No. 328. On 21 September 2026, she peaked at No. 218 in the WTA doubles rankings.

Reasco made her Fed Cup debut for Ecuador in 2019.

== ITF Circuit finals ==
=== Singles: 6 (2 titles, 4 runner-ups) ===
| Legend W35 tournaments W15 tournaments | Finals by surface Hard (1–2) Clay (1–2) |

| Result | W–L | Date | Tournament | Tier | Surface | Opponent | Score |
|---|---|---|---|---|---|---|---|
| Win | 1–0 | Jun 2021 | ITF Monastir, Tunisia | W15 | Hard | (Serbia) Katarina Kozarov | 7–6^{(7)}, 3–6, 6–4 |
| Win | 2–0 | Jun 2023 | ITF Buenos Aires, Argentina | W15 | Clay | (Peru) Romina Ccuno | 6–3, 6–2 |
| Loss | 2–1 | Aug 2025 | ITF Santiago, Chile | W15 | Clay | (Chile) Antonia Vergara Rivera | 3–6, 2–6 |
| Loss | 2–2 | Sep 2025 | ITF Santa Tecla, El Salvador | W15 | Hard | (France) Sophia Biolay | 4–6, 0–6 |
| Loss | 2–3 | Oct 2025 | ITF Santa Tecla, El Salvador | W15 | Hard | (France) Sophia Biolay | 6–7^{(4)}, 3–6 |
| Loss | 2–4 | Jul 2026 | ITF São Paulo, Brazil | W35 | Clay | (France) Océane Babel | 3–6, 4–6 |

=== Doubles: 14 (6 titles, 8 runner-ups) ===
| Legend W100 tournaments W50 tournaments W25/35 tournaments W15 tournaments | Finals by surface Hard (1–3) Clay (5–5) |

| Result | W–L | Date | Tournament | Tier | Surface | Partner | Opponents | Score |
|---|---|---|---|---|---|---|---|---|
| Loss | 0–1 | Oct 2019 | ITF Santiago, Chile | W15 | Clay | (Colombia) Antonia Samudio | (Peru) Romina Ccuno (Guatemala) Melissa Morales | 3–6, 3–6 |
| Loss | 0–2 | Jul 2021 | ITF Cairo, Egypt | W15 | Clay | (Slovakia) Alica Rusová | (Kazakhstan) Zhibek Kulambayeva (Russia) Anastasia Sukhotina | 0–6, 0–6 |
| Loss | 0–3 | Aug 2021 | ITF Cairo, Egypt | W15 | Clay | (Colombia) María Paulina Pérez | (Kazakhstan) Zhibek Kulambayeva (Egypt) Sandra Samir | 5–7, 3–6 |
| Win | 1–3 | Jun 2022 | ITF Santo Domingo, Dominican Republic | W25 | Hard | (France) Tiphanie Lemaître | (United States) Hina Inoue (United States) Taylor Ng | 6–4, 6–4 |
| Win | 2–3 | Jun 2023 | ITF Buenos Aires, Argentina | W15 | Clay | (Ecuador) Camila Romero | (Chile) Alessandra Caceres (Argentina) Rocio Daniela Merlo | 6–2, 6–4 |
| Loss | 2–4 | Jul 2023 | ITF Rosario-Santa Fe, Argentina | W15 | Clay | (Ecuador) Camila Romero | (Argentina) Julieta Lara Estable (Argentina) Guillermina Naya | walkover |
| Loss | 2–5 | May 2024 | ITF Santo Domingo, Dominican Republic | W35 | Hard | (Mexico) Jéssica Hinojosa Gómez | (Australia) Alexandra Bozovic (Hong Kong) Cody Wong | 7–6^{(5)}, 5–7, [9–11] |
| Loss | 2–6 | Jun 2024 | ITF Santo Domingo, Dominican Republic | W35 | Hard | (Germany) Antonia Schmidt | (Mexico) Julia García Ruiz (Dominican Republic) Ana Carmen Zamburek | 4–6, 6–2, [4–10] |
| Loss | 2–7 | Sep 2025 | ITF São Luís, Brazil | W15 | Clay | (United States) Hibah Shaikh | (Brazil) Letícia Garcia Vidal (Brazil) Júlia Konishi Camargo Silva | walkover |
| Win | 3–7 | Oct 2025 | ITF Ibague, Colombia | W50 | Clay | (Chile) Jimar Gerald González | (Argentina) Carla Markus (Chile) Antonia Vergara Rivera | walkover |
| Win | 4–7 | Oct 2025 | ITF Neuquén, Argentina | W35 | Clay | (Chile) Jimar Gerald González | (Italy) Miriana Tona (Argentina) Maria Florencia Urrutia | 6–4, 2–6, [10–8] |
| Loss | 4–8 | Feb 2026 | ITF Las Vegas, United States | W35 | Hard | (Mexico) Jessica Hinojosa Gómez | (Italy) Anastasia Abbagnato (United States) Haley Giavara | 3–6, 6–4, [8–10] |
| Win | 5–8 | Apr 2026 | Bonita Springs Championship, US | W100 | Clay | (Czech Republic) Darja Vidmanova | (Bulgaria) Lia Karatancheva (United States) Anna Rogers | 7–5, 6–3 |
| Win | 6–8 | Jun 2026 | ITF Cuiabá, Brazil | W35 | Clay | (Bolivia) Noelia Zeballos | (Argentina) Justina María González (Ecuador) Camila Romero | 7–6^{(1)}, 6–3 |
