= Luciana Moyano =

Argentine tennis player

- Country (sports): Argentina
- Born: 27 September 2005 (age 21)
- Plays: Right-handed (double-handed backhand)
- Prize money: $28,272

Singles
- Career record: 47–45
- Highest ranking: No. 777 (31 October 2022)
- Current ranking: No. 790 (22 December 2025)

Grand Slam singles results
- French Open Junior: 2R (2022)
- Wimbledon Junior: 1R (2023)
- US Open Junior: 1R (2022)

Doubles
- Career record: 80–32
- Highest ranking: No. 431 (6 October 2025)
- Current ranking: No. 442 (22 December 2025)

Grand Slam doubles results
- French Open Junior: 2R (2022)
- Wimbledon Junior: 3R (2023)
- US Open Junior: 1R (2022)
Medal record
South American Youth Games
Gold medal – first place	2022 Rosario	Ladies singles
Gold medal – first place	2022 Rosario	Ladies doubles
Gold medal – first place	2022 Rosario	Mixed doubles
2021 Junior Pan American Games
Gold medal – first place	2021 Cali	Girls' singles
Gold medal – first place	2021 Cali	Mixed doubles
- Last updated on: 22 December 2025.

Luciana Moyano (born 27 September 2005) is an Argentine tennis player.

== Early and personal life ==
From Juárez Celman Department in Cordoba Province, Argentina, Luciana Moyano was born to Gustavo and Teresa. Luciana started playing tennis at the age of three years-old and went on to train at the Club Provincial de Rosario. She is coached by her brothers Matías and Agustín alongside Juan Castagnaro. Her nickname is 'Luli'.

== Career ==
=== Junior career ===
Luciana won junior ITF tournaments, including the J5 of Tarija 2019, the J5 of Santa Cruz de la Sierra 2020 in Bolivia, and the J4 of Córdoba in August 2020. She was part of the Argentina team that won the South American Under 16 Championship in Asunción, Paraguay.

Luciana was a gold medalist in singles and mixed doubles (alongside Lautaro Midón) at the 2021 Junior Pan American Games in Cali, Colombia. That year, she made her debut in the Junior Billie Jean King Cup for Argentina.

Luciana won three gold medals at the 2022 South American Youth Games in Rosario, winning the women's singles, women's doubles alongside Luisina Giovannini, and mixed doubles alongside Midón. She was given the honour of being a flag-bearer for her country in the opening ceremony at the Games.

=== Pro career ===
Luciana qualified for the 2021 Argentina Open for her WTA main draw debut, where she lost to Diane Parry.

Luciana was selected to represent Argentina at the 2023 Pan American Games in Santiago under Argentine coach Mercedes Paz. On her debut she defeated Dominican Ana Zamburek in straight sets.

Luciana won two doubles titles in October 2024 alongside Ecuadorian partner Camila Romero. They also won a title together in Asuncion, Paraguay in November 2024.

== ITF Circuit finals ==
=== Singles: 4 (2 titles, 2 runner-ups) ===
Legend
W15 tournaments

Result	W–L	Date	Tournament	Tier	Surface	Opponent	Score
Win	1–0	Oct 2022	ITF Eldorado, Argentina	W15	Clay	(France) Emma Léné	1–6, 6–4, 6–4
Win	2–0	Mar 2026	ITF Santiago, Chile	W15	Clay	(Spain) Sara Dols	6–4, 4–6, 6–1
Loss	2–1	Jun 2026	ITF Asunción, Paraguay	W15	Clay	(Brazil) Ana Candiotto	3–6, 6–7^{(5)}
Loss	2–2	Oct 2026	ITF Neuquén, Argentina	W15	Clay	(Argentina) Josefina Estévez	0–6, 3–6

=== Doubles: 31 (15 titles, 16 runner–ups) ===
Legend W50 tournaments (1–0) W25/35 tournaments (2–4) W15 tournaments (12–12)	Finals by surface Hard (4–3) Clay (11–13)

Result	W–L	Date	Tournament	Tier	Surface	Partner	Opponents	Score
Win	1–0	Jun 2022	ITF Norges-la-Ville, France	W15	Clay	Anastasiia Gureva	Natalia Orlova (France) Lucie Wargnier	6–0, 6–0
Loss	1–1	Oct 2022	ITF Eldorado, Argentina	W15	Clay	(Mexico) Marian Gómez Pezuela Cano	(Argentina) Berta Bonardi (Argentina) Tiziana Rossini	6–7^{(3)}, 6–4, [7–10]
Loss	1–2	Oct 2022	ITF Tucumán, Argentina	W25	Clay	(Mexico) Marian Gómez Pezuela Cano	(Netherlands) Lexie Stevens (Ukraine) Valeriya Strakhova	3–6, 2–6
Loss	1–3	Jul 2023	ITF Bragado, Argentina	W25	Clay	(Argentina) Candela Vasquez	(Peru) Romina Ccuno (Mexico) Victoria Rodríguez	2–6, 3–6
Win	2–3	Oct 2024	ITF Trelew, Argentina	W15	Hard (i)	(Ecuador) Camila Romero	(Argentina) Lourdes Ayala (Argentina) Justina González Daniele	6–7^{(2)}, 7–5, [10–6]
Win	3–3	Oct 2024	ITF Trelew, Argentina	W15	Hard (i)	(Ecuador) Camila Romero	(Argentina) Victoria Bosio (Mexico) Marian Gómez Pezuela Cano	7–6^{(4)}, 6–3
Loss	3–4	Oct 2024	ITF Luque, Paraguay	W15	Clay	(Ecuador) Camila Romero	(Brazil) Camilla Bossi (Brazil) Ana Candiotto	4–6, 7–5, [7–10]
Win	4–4	Nov 2024	ITF Asunción, Paraguay	W15	Clay	(Ecuador) Camila Romero	(Argentina) Berta Bonardi (Chile) Antonia Vergara Rivera	6–4, 6–7^{(5)}, [11–9]
Loss	4–5	Dec 2024	ITF Joinville, Brazil	W15	Clay (i)	(Ecuador) Camila Romero	(United States) Sabastiani Leon (Switzerland) Marie Mettraux	6–7^{(3)}, 6–7^{(6)}
Loss	4–6	Apr 2025	ITF Leme, Brazil	W35	Clay	(Bolivia) Noelia Zeballos	(Peru) Romina Ccuno (Chile) Fernanda Labraña	2–6, 5–7
Loss	4–7	May 2025	ITF Trelew, Argentina	W15	Hard (i)	(Ecuador) Camila Romero	(Argentina) Martina Capurro Taborda (Mexico) Marian Gómez Pezuela Cano	0–6, 6–7^{(7)}
Win	5–7	May 2025	ITF Trelew, Argentina	W15	Hard (i)	(Ecuador) Camila Romero	(Argentina) Martina Capurro Taborda (Mexico) Marian Gómez Pezuela Cano	6–1, 6–4
Loss	5–8	Sep 2025	ITF Luján, Argentina	W15	Clay	(Ecuador) Camila Romero	(Argentina) Martina Capurro Taborda (Chile) Fernanda Labraña	2–6, 6–7^{(4)}
Win	6–8	Sep 2025	ITF Luján, Argentina	W15	Clay	(Ecuador) Camila Romero	(Argentina) Justina González Daniele (Chile) Fernanda Labraña	6–3, 7–5
Loss	6–9	Nov 2025	ITF Neuquén, Argentina	W15	Clay	(Argentina) Justina González Daniele	(United States) Isabella Barrera Aguirre (Brazil) Júlia Konishi Camargo Silva	3–6, 2–6
Win	7–9	Nov 2025	ITF Criciúma, Brazil	W15	Clay	(Argentina) Justina González Daniele	(Brazil) Luiza Fullana (Brazil) Júlia Konishi Camargo Silva	7–6^{(5)}, 4–6, [10–4]
Win	8–9	Dec 2025	ITF Lima, Peru	W15	Clay	(Brazil) Ana Candiotto	(Jamaica) Najah Dawson (Brazil) Júlia Konishi Camargo Silva	6–4, 6–1
Win	9–9	Dec 2025	ITF Lima, Peru	W15	Clay	(Ecuador) Camila Romero	(Switzerland) Marie Mettraux (Germany) Marie Vogt	4–6, 6–4, [10–6]
Win	10–9	Dec 2025	ITF Lima, Peru	W15	Clay	(Ecuador) Camila Romero	(Brazil) Júlia Konishi Camargo Silva (Chile) Fernanda Labraña	6–2, 6–7^{(6)}, [11–9]
Win	11–9	Jan 2026	ITF Buenos Aires, Argentina	W50	Clay	(Ecuador) Camila Romero	(Mexico) María Fernanda Navarro Oliva (United States) Anna Rogers	1–6, 7–6^{(4)}, [12–10]
Win	12–9	Mar 2026	ITF Santiago, Chile	W15	Clay	(Chile) Antonia Vergara Rivera	(Peru) Romina Ccuno (Chile) Fernanda Labraña	3–6, 6–0, [10–6]
Win	13–9	Mar 2026	ITF Junin, Argentina	W35	Clay	(Ecuador) Camila Romero	(United States) Isabella Barrera Aguirre (Argentina) Justina María González Daniele	7–5, 6–3
Win	14–9	May 2026	ITF Monastir, Tunisia	W35	Hard	(France) Laïa Petretic	(Italy) Lavinia Luciano (Italy) Matilde Mariani	6–3, 6–3
Loss	14–10	May 2026	ITF Monastir, Tunisia	W15	Hard	(France) Laïa Petretic	(Italy) Anastasia Bertacchi (Italy) Carlotta Moccia	2–6, 1–6
Loss	14–11	May 2026	ITF Monastir, Tunisia	W15	Hard	(Mexico) Lya Fernández	(Italy) Lavinia Luciano (Italy) Matilde Mariani	Walkover
Loss	14–12	Jun 2026	ITF Luque, Paraguay	W15	Clay	(Ecuador) Camila Romero	(Brazil) Ana Candiotto (Argentina) Justina María González Daniele	6–7^{(4)}, 5–7
Loss	14–13	Jul 2026	ITF Pergamino, Argentina	W35	Clay	(Ecuador) Camila Romero	(Brazil) Rebeca Pereira (Argentina) María Florencia Urrutia	6–4, 1–6, [8–10]
Loss	14–14	Aug 2026	ITF Luján, Argentina	W15	Clay	(Ecuador) Camila Romero	(Venezuela) Sofía Cabezas Domínguez (Mexico) María Fernanda Navarro Oliva	2–6, 6–3, [5–10]
Loss	14–15	Sep 2026	ITF Pilar, Argentina	W15	Clay	(Ecuador) Camila Romero	(Venezuela) Sofía Cabezas Domínguez (Mexico) María Fernanda Navarro Oliva	3–6, 3–6
Win	15–15	Oct 2026	ITF Neuquén, Argentina	W15	Clay	(United Kingdom) Melissa Boyden	(Argentina) Josefina Estévez (Argentina) Sol Ailin Larraya Guidi	6–3, 6–3
Loss	15–16	Nov 2026	ITF Neuquén, Argentina	W15	Clay	(Ecuador) Camila Romero	(Chile) Fernanda Labraña (Chile) Antonia Vergara Rivera	4–6, 6–4, [7–10]
