= Camila Romero =

Ecuadorian tennis player (born 1998)

- Country (sports): Ecuador
- Born: 5 October 1998 (age 28) Guayaquil, Ecuador
- Height: 1.75 m (5 ft 9 in)
- Plays: Right (two-handed backhand)
- College: University of Oklahoma
- Prize money: $57,582

Singles
- Career record: 134–119
- Highest ranking: No. 555 (25 August 2025)
- Current ranking: No. 853 (22 December 2025)

Doubles
- Career record: 161–93
- Career titles: 14 ITF
- Highest ranking: No. 279 (29 June 2026)
- Current ranking: No. 279 (29 June 2026)

Team competitions
- Fed Cup: 20–12
- Last updated on: 5 July 2026.

Camila Romero (born 5 October 1998) is an Ecuadorian tennis player.

Romero has a career-high doubles ranking of 279 by the WTA, achieved on 29 June 2026. She also has a career-high WTA singles ranking of 555, reached on 25 August 2025. Romero has won 14 doubles titles at tournaments of the ITF Women's World Tennis Tour.

Romero represents Ecuador in the Billie Jean King Cup. As of May 2024, she has a win-loss record of 20–12 (11–7 in singles).

== ITF Circuit finals ==
=== Singles: 1 (runner-up) ===
Legend W15 tournaments (0–1)	Finals by surface Clay (0–1)

Result	W–L	Date	Tournament	Tier	Surface	Opponent	Score
Loss	0–1	Dec 2024	ITF Mogi das Cruzes, Brazil	W15	Clay	(Brazil) Ana Candiotto	0–6, 3–6

=== Doubles: 34 (16 titles, 18 runner-ups) ===
Legend W50 tournaments (1–0) W35 tournaments (1–5) W15 tournaments (14–13)	Finals by surface Hard (4–2) Clay (12–16)

Result	W–L	Date	Tournament	Tier	Surface	Partner	Opponents	Score
Loss	0–1	Aug 2018	ITF Guayaquil, Ecuador	W15	Clay	(Argentina) Martina Capurro Taborda	(Chile) Fernanda Brito (Argentina) Sofía Luini	6–7^{(5)}, 3–6
Win	1–1	Jul 2019	ITF Lima, Peru	W15	Clay	(Chile) Fernanda Labraña	(Venezuela) Nadia Echeverría Alam (Romania) Diana Maria Mihail	6–2, 6–4
Win	2–1	Aug 2022	ITF Cancún, Mexico	W15	Hard	(United Kingdom) Alisha Reayer	Noel Saidenova (Germany) Jantje Tilbürger	6–3, 7–6^{(3)}
Win	3–1	Jun 2023	ITF Buenos Aires, Argentina	W15	Clay	(Ecuador) Mell Reasco	(Chile) Alessandra Cáceres (Argentina) Rocio Merlo	6–2, 6–4
Loss	3–2	Jul 2023	ITF Rosario Santa-Fe, Argentina	W15	Clay	(Ecuador) Mell Reasco	(Argentina) Julieta Lara Estable (Argentina) Guillermina Naya	walkover
Win	4–2	Nov 2023	ITF Buenos Aires, Argentina	W15	Clay	(Brazil) Thaisa Grana Pedretti	(Argentina) Justina González Daniele (Liechtenstein) Sylvie Zünd	0–6, 7–5, [10–5]
Win	5–2	Feb 2024	ITF Tucumán, Argentina	W15	Clay	(Argentina) Justina González Daniele	(Brazil) Ana Candiotto (Bolivia) Noelia Zeballos	4–6, 7–6^{(6)}, [10–8]
Loss	5–3	Mar 2024	ITF Córdoba, Argentina	W15	Clay	(Argentina) Candela Vázquez	(Spain) Alicia Herrero Liñana (Argentina) Melany Krywoj	2–6, 7–5, [5–10]
Win	6–3	Jun 2024	ITF Rio Claro, Brazil	W15	Clay	(Brazil) Rebeca Pereira	(Argentina) Jazmín Ortenzi (Peru) Lucciana Pérez Alarcón	6–3, 6–1
Loss	6–4	Sep 2024	ITF Leme, Brazil	W35	Clay	(Brazil) Rebeca Pereira	(Italy) Miriana Tona (Bolivia) Noelia Zeballos	6–4, 4–6, [4–10]
Win	7–4	Oct 2024	ITF Trelew, Argentina	W15	Hard (i)	(Argentina) Luciana Moyano	(Argentina) Lourdes Ayala (Argentina) Justina González Daniele	6–7^{(2)}, 7–5, [10–6]
Win	8–4	Oct 2024	ITF Trelew, Argentina	W15	Hard (i)	(Argentina) Luciana Moyano	(Argentina) Victoria Bosio (Mexico) Marian Gómez Pezuela Cano	7–6^{(4)}, 6–3
Loss	8–5	Oct 2024	ITF Luque, Paraguay	W15	Clay	(Argentina) Luciana Moyano	(Brazil) Camilla Bossi (Brazil) Ana Candiotto	4–6, 7–5, [7–10]
Win	9–5	Nov 2024	ITF Asunción, Paraguay	W15	Clay	(Argentina) Luciana Moyano	(Argentina) Berta Bonardi (Chile) Antonia Vergara Rivera	6–4, 6–7^{(5)}, [11–9]
Loss	9–6	Dec 2024	ITF Joinville, Brazil	W15	Clay (i)	(Argentina) Luciana Moyano	(United States) Sabastiani Leon (Switzerland) Marie Mettraux	6–7^{(3)}, 6–7^{(6)}
Loss	9–7	May 2025	ITF Trelew, Argentina	W15	Hard (i)	(Argentina) Luciana Moyano	(Argentina) Martina Capurro Taborda (Mexico) Marian Gómez Pezuela Cano	0–6, 6–7^{(7)}
Win	10–7	May 2025	ITF Trelew, Argentina	W15	Hard (i)	(Argentina) Luciana Moyano	(Argentina) Martina Capurro Taborda (Mexico) Marian Gómez Pezuela Cano	6–1, 6–4
Loss	10–8	Aug 2025	ITF Santiago, Chile	W15	Clay	(Chile) Antonia Vergara Rivera	(Peru) Romina Ccuno (Chile) Fernanda Labraña	2–6, 3–6
Loss	10–9	Sep 2025	ITF Punta Cana, Dominican Republic	W35	Clay	(Poland) Zuzanna Pawlikowska	(Poland) Weronika Falkowska (Germany) Katharina Hobgarski	2–6, 5–7
Loss	10–10	Sep 2025	ITF Luján, Argentina	W15	Clay	(Argentina) Luciana Moyano	(Argentina) Martina Capurro Taborda (Chile) Fernanda Labraña	2–6, 6–7^{(4)}
Win	11–10	Sep 2025	ITF Luján, Argentina	W15	Clay	(Argentina) Luciana Moyano	(Argentina) Justina González Daniele (Chile) Fernanda Labraña	6–3, 7–5
Win	12–10	Dec 2025	ITF Lima, Peru	W15	Clay	(Argentina) Luciana Moyano	(Switzerland) Marie Mettraux (Germany) Marie Vogt	4–6, 6–4, [10–6]
Win	13–10	Dec 2025	ITF Lima, Peru	W15	Clay	(Argentina) Luciana Moyano	(Brazil) Júlia Konishi Camargo Silva (Chile) Fernanda Labraña	6–2, 6–7^{(6)}, [11–9]
Win	14–10	Jan 2026	ITF Buenos Aires, Argentina	W50	Clay	(Argentina) Luciana Moyano	(Mexico) María Fernanda Navarro Oliva (United States) Anna Rogers	1–6, 7–6^{(4)}, [12–10]
Win	15–10	Mar 2026	ITF Junin, Argentina	W35	Clay	(Argentina) Luciana Moyano	(United States) Isabella Barrera Aguirre (Argentina) Justina González Daniele	7–5, 6–3
Win	16–10	Jun 2026	ITF Brasília, Brazil	W15	Hard	(Bolivia) Noelia Zeballos	(Colombia) María Herazo González (Argentina) Francesca Mattioli	6–4, 6–1
Loss	16–11	Jun 2026	ITF Cuiabá, Brazil	W35	Clay	(Argentina) Justina González Daniele	(Ecuador) Mell Reasco (Bolivia) Noelia Zeballos	6–7^{(1)}, 3–6
Loss	16–12	Jun 2026	ITF Luque, Paraguay	W15	Clay	(Argentina) Luciana Moyano	(Brazil) Ana Candiotto (Argentina) Justina González Daniele	6–7^{(4)}, 5–7
Loss	16–13	Jul 2026	ITF Pergamino, Argentina	W35	Clay	(Argentina) Luciana Moyano	(Brazil) Rebeca Pereira (Argentina) María Florencia Urrutia	6–4, 1–6, [8–10]
Loss	16–14	Aug 2026	ITF Barueri, Brazil	W35	Hard	(Mexico) María Fernanda Navarro Oliva	(Venezuela) Sofía Cabezas Domínguez (Brazil) Ana Candiotto	4–6, 2–6
Loss	16–15	Aug 2026	ITF Luján, Argentina	W15	Clay	(Argentina) Luciana Moyano	(Venezuela) Sofía Cabezas Domínguez (Mexico) María Fernanda Navarro Oliva	2–6, 6–3, [5–10]
Loss	16–16	Sep 2026	ITF Pilar, Argentina	W15	Clay	(Argentina) Luciana Moyano	(Venezuela) Sofía Cabezas Domínguez (Mexico) María Fernanda Navarro Oliva	3–6, 3–6
Loss	16–17	Oct 2026	ITF Maceió, Brazil	W15	Clay (i)	(Argentina) Lourdes Ayala	(Chile) Bárbara Gatica (Brazil) Rebeca Pereira	4–6, 0–6
Loss	16–18	Nov 2026	ITF Neuquén, Argentina	W15	Clay	(Argentina) Luciana Moyano	(Chile) Fernanda Labraña (Chile) Antonia Vergara Rivera	4–6, 6–4, [7–10]
