= Fernanda Labraña =

Chilean tennis player (born 1999)

- Country (sports): Chile
- Residence: Talagante, Chile
- Born: 13 March 1999 (age 27) Santiago, Chile
- Height: 1.73 m (5 ft 8 in)
- Plays: Right (two-handed backhand)
- College: Austin
- Prize money: $96,515

Singles
- Career record: 159–133
- Highest ranking: No. 424 (13 April 2026)
- Current ranking: No. 452 (10 August 2026)

Doubles
- Career record: 171–93
- Career titles: 15 ITF
- Highest ranking: No. 336 (2 February 2026)
- Current ranking: No. 386 (10 August 2026)

Team competitions
- Fed Cup: 9–14
Medal record
Representing Chile
Women's Tennis
South American Games
Bronze medal – third place	2022 Asunción	Women's doubles
- Last updated on: 17 August 2026.

Fernanda Carolina Labraña Mendoza (born 13 March 1999) is a Chilean tennis player.

Labraña has a career-high singles ranking by the WTA of 424, achieved on 13 April 2026. She also has a career-high doubles ranking of world No. 336, achieved on 2 February 2026. Up to date, she has won 15 doubles titles on the ITF Women's World Tennis Tour.

She attended college at the University of Texas at Austin.

== Career highlights ==
Labraña competes for Chile in the Billie Jean King Cup. She has accumulated a win/loss record of 9–14 (as of August 2026).

== ITF Circuit finals ==
=== Singles: 3 (3 runner-ups) ===
Legend W35 tournaments (0–1) W15 tournaments (0–2)	Finals by surface Clay (0–3)

Result	W–L	Date	Tournament	Tier	Surface	Opponent	Score
Loss	0–1	Sep 2025	ITF Luján, Argentina	W15	Clay	(Argentina) Martina Capurro Taborda	6–3, 6–7^{(1)}, 4–6
Loss	0–2	Oct 2025	ITF Neuquén, Argentina	W35	Clay	(Argentina) Martina Capurro Taborda	1–6, 0–6
Loss	0–3	Mar 2026	ITF Santiago, Chile	W15	Clay	(Argentina) Victoria Bosio	6–7^{(4)}, 6–4, 6–7^{(5)}

=== Doubles: 33 (16 titles, 17 runner-ups) ===
Legend W25/35 tournaments W15 tournaments	Finals by surface Hard (2–5) Clay (14–12)

Result	W–L	Date	Tournament	Tier	Surface	Partner	Opponents	Score
Loss	0–1	Jun 2019	ITF Cancún, Mexico	W15	Hard	(Argentina) Melany Krywoj	(Mexico) Fernanda Contreras (Mexico) Jessica Hinojosa Gómez	6–2, 4–6, [7–10]
Win	1–1	Jul 2019	ITF Lima, Peru	W15	Clay	(Ecuador) Camila Romero	(Venezuela) Nadia Echeverría Alam (Romania) Diana Maria Mihail	6–2, 6–4
Win	2–1	Oct 2019	ITF Norman, US	W15	Hard	(Italy) Anna Turati	(Dominican Republic) Kelly Williford (United States) Amy Zhu	6–1, 7–5
Loss	2–2	Oct 2019	ITF Austin, US	W15	Hard	(Argentina) Melany Krywoj	(Italy) Anna Turati (Italy) Bianca Turati	3–6, 6–1, [4–10]
Loss	2–3	Jul 2021	ITF Prokuplje, Serbia	W15	Clay	(Italy) Anna Turati	(Romania) Karola Bejenaru (Ukraine) Viktoriia Dema	w/o
Win	3–3	Oct 2021	ITF Lubbock, US	W15	Hard	(France) Tiphanie Fiquet	(United States) Carmen Corley (United States) Ivana Corley	6–4, 6–7^{(2)}, [10–8]
Win	4–3	Apr 2022	ITF São Paulo, Brazil	W15	Clay	(Argentina) Martina Capurro Taborda	(Chile) Fernanda Astete (Mexico) Marian Gómez Pezuela Cano	6–2, 6–1
Win	5–3	May 2022	ITF Curitiba, Brazil	W15	Clay	(Argentina) Martina Capurro Taborda	(Portugal) Ana Filipa Santos (Bolivia) Noelia Zeballos	6–1, 6–4
Win	6–3	May 2022	ITF São Paulo, Brazil	W15	Clay	(Argentina) Martina Capurro Taborda	(Peru) Romina Ccuno (Bolivia) Noelia Zeballos	7–6^{(1)}, 3–6, [10–7]
Loss	6–4	Jul 2022	ITF Kottingbrunn, Austria	W15	Clay	(Italy) Dalila Spiteri	(Hungary) Amarissa Tóth (Turkey) Doğa Türkmen	w/o
Loss	6–5	Aug 2022	ITF Eupen, Belgium	W25	Clay	(Italy) Anna Turati	(Czech Republic) Aneta Kučmová (Japan) Misaki Matsuda	6–7^{(5)}, 3–6
Loss	6–6	Feb 2023	ITF Monastir, Tunisia	W15	Hard	(Serbia) Elena Milovanović	(Chinese Taipei) Lee Ya-hsin (China) Liu Fangzhou	3–6, 6–7^{(12)}
Loss	6–7	Mar 2023	ITF Monastir, Tunisia	W15	Hard	(United States) Paris Corley	(United States) Dasha Ivanova (Italy) Angelica Raggi	2–6, 4–6
Loss	6–8	Mar 2023	ITF Monastir, Tunisia	W15	Hard	(Serbia) Elena Milovanović	(Bulgaria) Isabella Shinikova (Switzerland) Naïma Karamoko	4–6, 6–3, [5–10]
Loss	6–9	Aug 2023	ITF Junin, Argentina	W25	Clay	(Argentina) Julieta Lara Estable	(Peru) Romina Ccuno (Mexico) Victoria Rodríguez	2–6, 6–2, [7–10]
Win	7–9	Aug 2023	ITF Lima, Peru	W15	Clay	(Peru) Romina Ccuno	(Argentina) Lourdes Ayala (Argentina) Julieta Lara Estable	6–4, 6–4
Win	8–9	Sep 2023	ITF Luján, Argentina	W25	Clay	(Argentina) Martina Capurro Taborda	(Italy) Nicole Fossa Huergo (Germany) Luisa Meyer auf der Heide	6–2, 7–5
Loss	8–10	Jul 2024	ITF Torino, Italy	W35	Clay	(Argentina) Julieta Lara Estable	(Slovenia) Živa Falkner (Slovenia) Pia Lovrič	6–1, 2–6, [10–12]
Loss	8–11	Nov 2024	ITF Neuquén, Argentina	W15	Clay	(Peru) Lucciana Pérez	(Argentina) Luisina Giovannini (Mexico) Marian Gómez Pezuela Cano	3–6, 4–6
Win	9–11	Nov 2024	ITF Ribeirão Preto, Brazil	W15	Clay	(Peru) Romina Ccuno	(Brazil) Camilla Bossi (Brazil) Ana Candiotto	6–1, 2–6, [10–7]
Win	10–11	Dec 2024	ITF Mogi das Cruzes, Brazil	W15	Clay	(Chile) Antonia Vergara Rivera	(Brazil) Luiza Fullana (Brazil) Júlia Konishi Camargo Silva	7–5, 6–2
Win	11–11	Apr 2025	ITF Leme, Brazil	W35	Clay	(Peru) Romina Ccuno	(Argentina) Luciana Moyano (Bolivia) Noelia Zeballos	6–2, 7–5
Loss	11–12	Jul 2025	ITF Darmstadt, Germany	W35	Clay	(Brazil) Rebeca Pereira	(Switzerland) Chelsea Fontenel (France) Marie Mattel	3–6, 4–6
Win	12–12	Aug 2025	ITF Santiago, Chile	W15	Clay	(Peru) Romina Ccuno	(Italy) Beatrice Stagno (Chile) Antonia Vergara Rivera	6–1, 6–3
Win	13–12	Aug 2025	ITF Santiago, Chile	W15	Clay	(Peru) Romina Ccuno	(Ecuador) Camila Romero (Chile) Antonia Vergara Rivera	6–2, 6–3
Win	14–12	Sep 2025	ITF Luján, Argentina	W15	Clay	(Argentina) Martina Capurro Taborda	(Argentina) Luciana Moyano (Ecuador) Camila Romero	6–2, 7–6^{(4)}
Loss	14–13	Sep 2025	ITF Luján, Argentina	W15	Clay	(Argentina) Justina María González Daniele	(Argentina) Luciana Moyano (Ecuador) Camila Romero	3–6, 5–7
Loss	14–14	Dec 2025	ITF Lima, Peru	W15	Clay	(Brazil) Júlia Konishi Camargo Silva	(Argentina) Luciana Moyano (Ecuador) Camila Romero	2–6, 7–6^{(6)}, [9–11]
Win	15–14	Jan 2026	ITF Buenos Aires, Argentina	W35	Clay	(Brazil) Rebeca Pereira	(Argentina) Carla Markus (Argentina) María Florencia Urrutia	6–3, 5–7, [10–7]
Loss	15–15	Mar 2026	ITF Santiago, Chile	W15	Clay	(Peru) Romina Ccuno	(Brazil) Ana Candiotto (Chile) Antonia Vergara Rivera	1–6, 3–6
Loss	15–16	Mar 2026	ITF Santiago, Chile	W15	Clay	(Peru) Romina Ccuno	(Argentina) Luciana Moyano (Chile) Antonia Vergara Rivera	6–3, 0–6, [6–10]
Loss	15–17	Aug 2026	ITF Chacabuco, Argentina	W35	Clay	(Brazil) Júlia Konishi Camargo Silva	(Argentina) Sol Ailin Larraya Guidi (Colombia) Valentina Mediorreal	6–7^{(5)}, 6–7^{(1)}
Win	16–17	Nov 2026	ITF Neuquén, Argentina	W15	Clay	(Chile) Antonia Vergara Rivera	(Argentina) Luciana Moyano (Ecuador) Camila Romero	6–4, 4–6, [10–7]
