= Tennis at the 2026 South American Games =

Tennis competitions at the 2026 South American Games

- Venue: Hipodromo Ovalo
- Dates: September 21–26
- Competitors: 60 from 12 nations

Tennis competitions at the 2026 South American Games in Rosario, Santa Fe, and Rafaela, Argentina, were held between September 21 and 26 at Hipodromo Ovalo, located within Parque de la Independencia in Rosario.

A total of 5 events was contested (two men, two women and one mixed). Players who get the gold and silver medals in the singles events qualified for the 2027 Pan American Games, with the qualification quotas going to the players and not their NOCs.

== Medal summary ==
=== Medal table ===
* Host nation (Argentina)

Rank	Nation	Gold	Silver	Bronze	Total
1	Argentina*	2	4	2	8
2	Chile	1	1	0	2
3	Colombia	1	0	1	2
3	Peru	1	0	1	2
5	Brazil	0	0	1	1
Totals (5 entries)		5	5	5	15

=== Medalists ===
==== Men ====
Event	Gold	Silver	Bronze
Singles	Lautaro Midón; Argentina	Juan Manuel La Serna; Argentina	Luciano Emanuel Ambrogi; Argentina
Doubles	Colombia; Juan Sebastián Gómez; Cristian Rodríguez	Argentina; Juan Manuel La Serna; Lautaro Midón	Brazil; Enzo Kohlmann; Enzo Camargo

==== Women ====
Event	Gold	Silver	Bronze
Singles	Dana Guzmán; Peru	Jazmín Ortenzi; Argentina	Luciana Moyano; Argentina
Doubles	Argentina; Luisina Giovannini; Jazmín Ortenzi	Chile; Jimar Gerald; Antonia Vergara	Peru; Elizaveta Castillo; Silvana Fajardo

==== Mixed ====
Event	Gold	Silver	Bronze
Doubles	Chile; Fernanda Labraña; Matías Soto	Argentina; Luciana Moyano; Luciano Emanuel Ambrogi	Colombia; María Paulina Pérez García; Cristian Rodríguez

== Participation ==
Twelve nations participated in the table tennis events of the 2026 South American Games.

- Argentina (6)
- Bolivia (4)
- Brazil (4)
- Chile (6)
- Colombia (3)
- Curaçao (2)
- Guyana (1)
- Paraguay (6)
- Peru (6)
- Suriname (2)
- Uruguay (4)
- Venezuela (2)

== Results ==
=== Men's singles ===
1st Round
A Nuñez (PAR)	2
B Pérez (VEN)	1
Y Bergen (SUR)	0
O Solís (BOL)	2
A Rubini (PER)	1
F Llanes (URU)	2
A Gómez (CUR)	2
J Loor (SUR)	0
H Escurra (PAR)	2
E Kohlmann (BRA)	0
T Zurmendi (URU)	0
K Nakamine (PER)	2

2nd Round
L Midon (ARG)	2
A Nuñez (PAR)	0
E Camargo (BRA)	2
D Númez (CHI)	1
L Ambrogi (ARG)	2
O Solís (BOL)	0
F Llanes (URU)	W
J Gómez (COL)	RET
N Villalón (CHI)	2
A Gómez (CUR)	0
H Escurra (PAR)	0
J La Serna (ARG)	2
J Echeverría (VEN)	2
L Suárez (BOL)	0
K Nakamine (PER)	2
M Soto (CHI)	1

Quarterfinals
L Midon (ARG)	2
E Camargo (BRA)	0
L Ambrogi (ARG)	0
F Llanes (URU)	2
N Villalón (CHI)	0
J La Serna (ARG)	2
J Echeverría (VEN)	2
K Nakamine (PER)	0

Semifinals
L Midon (ARG)	2
L Ambrogi (ARG)	0
J La Serna (ARG)	2
J Echeverría (VEN)	0

Final
L Midon (ARG)	2
J La Serna (ARG)	0
Third place
L Ambrogi (ARG)	2
J Echeverría (VEN)	0

=== Men's doubles ===
1st Round
F Llanes (URU); T Zurmendi (URU)	1
O Solís (BOL); L Suárez (BOL)	2
M Vergara (PAR); H Escurra (PAR)	0
A Merino (PER); L Nakamine (PER)	2

Quarterfinals
J Gómez (COL); C Rodríguez (COL)	2
O Solís (BOL); L Suárez (BOL)	0
E Camargo (BRA); E Kohlmann (BRA)	2
J Loor (SUR); Y Bergen (SUR)	0
J La Serna (ARG); L Midón (ARG)	2
N Villalón (CHI); D Núñez (CHI)	0
A Merino (PER); L Nakamine (PER)	2
B Pérez (VEN); J Echeverría (VEN)	0

Semifinals
J Gómez (COL); C Rodríguez (COL)	2
E Camargo (BRA); E Kohlmann (BRA)	0
J La Serna (ARG); L Midón (ARG)	2
A Merino (PER); L Nakamine (PER)	0

Final
J Gómez (COL); C Rodríguez (COL)	2
J La Serna (ARG); L Midón (ARG)	0
Third place
E Camargo (BRA); E Kohlmann (BRA)	2
A Merino (PER); L Nakamine (PER)	0

=== Women's singles ===
1st Round
S Fajardo (PER)	2
G Schincariol (BRA)	1
P Franco (PAR)	0
V Sumoya (BOL)	2
J Rodríguez (URU)	0
M Pérez (COL)	2
E Castillo (PER)	1
M Sejas (BOL)	2
S Nito (CUR)	2
G Muela (URU)	0

2nd Round
J Ortenzi (ARG)	2
S Fajardo (PER)	0
C Delmas (PAR)	0
J Gerald (CHI)	2
F Labraña (CHI)	2
V Sumoya (BOL)	0
M Pérez (COL)	0
L Moyano (ARG)	2
S Vickery (GUY)	2
L Britez (PAR)	0
M Sejas (BOL)	0
A Vergara (CHI)	2
D Guzmán (PER)	2
H Caruso (BRA)	0
S Nito (CUR)	0
L Giovannini (ARG)	2

Quarterfinals
J Ortenzi (ARG)	2
J Gerald (CHI)	0
F Labraña (CHI)	1
L Moyano (ARG)	2
S Vickery (GUY)	2
A Vergara (CHI)	0
D Guzmán (PER)	2
L Giovannini (ARG)	0

Semifinals
J Ortenzi (ARG)	2
L Moyano (ARG)	0
S Vickery (GUY)	0
D Guzmán (PER)	2

Final
J Ortenzi (ARG)	2
D Guzmán (PER)	0
Third place
L Moyano (ARG)	2
S Vickery (GUY)	0

=== Women's doubles ===
Quarterfinals
G Muela (URU); J Rodríguez (URU)	0
S Fajardo (PER); E Castillo (PER)	2
G Schincariol (BRA); H Caruso (BRA)	0
V Sumoya (BOL); M Sejan (BOL)	2
C Delmas (PAR); P Franco (PAR)	0
J Ortenzi (ARG); L Giovannini (ARG)	2

Semifinals
J Gerald (CHI); A Vergara (CHI)	2
S Fajardo (PER); E Castillo (PER)	0
V Sumoya (BOL); M Sejan (BOL)	0
J Ortenzi (ARG); L Giovannini (ARG)	2

Final
J Gerald (CHI); A Vergara (CHI)	0
J Ortenzi (ARG); L Giovannini (ARG)	2
Third place
S Fajardo (PER); E Castillo (PER)	2
V Sumoya (BOL); M Sejan (BOL)	1

=== Mixed doubles ===
Quarterfinals
A Merino (PER); D Guzmán (PER)	0
M Vergara (PAR); L Britez (PAR)	2
L Moyano (ARG); L Ambrogi (ARG)	2
S Nito (CUR); A Gómez (CUR)	0

Semifinals
F Labraña (CHI); M Soto (CHI)	2
M Vergara (PAR); L Britez (PAR)	0
L Moyano (ARG); L Ambrogi (ARG)	2
M Pérez (COL); C Rodríguez (COL)	0

Final
F Labraña (CHI); M Soto (CHI)	2
L Moyano (ARG); L Ambrogi (ARG)	0
Third place
M Vergara (PAR); L Britez (PAR)	0
M Pérez (COL); C Rodríguez (COL)	2
