= Tennis at the 2022 South American Games =

Tennis competitions at the 2022 South American Games

- Tennis pictogram
- Venue: Rakiura Resort
- Dates: 11–15 October 2022
- Competitors: 54 from 10 nations

Tennis competitions at the 2022 South American Games in Asunción, Paraguay were held from 11 to 15 October 2022 at the Rakiura Resort cluster in Luque, a sub-venue outside Asunción.

Five medal events were scheduled to be contested; singles and doubles for both men and women and mixed doubles. A total of 54 athletes (26 men and 28 women) competed in the events. Participating players had to be at least 14 years old at the start of the competition.

Players who got the gold and silver medals in the singles events will qualified for the 2023 Pan American Games, with the qualification quotas going to the players and not their NOCs.

Chile were the South American Games tennis competitions defending champions having won them in the previous edition in Cochabamba 2018. Colombia won the tennis competitions with two gold medals and one bronze.

== Participating nations ==
A total of 10 nations registered athletes for the tennis competitions. Each nation was able to enter a maximum of 6 players (3 per gender) and was able to participate with up to 3 players in the singles events and a pair of players in the doubles events. Each player can compete in a maximum of two events.

- Argentina (6 players)
- Brazil (6)
- Bolivia (6)
- Chile (6)
- Colombia (5)
- Ecuador (4)
- Paraguay (6)
- Peru (6)
- Uruguay (4)
- Venezuela (5)

== Venue ==
The tennis competitions were scheduled to be held at the Rakiura Resort cluster in Luque.

== Medal summary ==
=== Medal table ===
* Host nation (Paraguay)

Rank	Nation	Gold	Silver	Bronze	Total
1	Colombia (COL)	2	0	1	3
2	Brazil (BRA)	1	2	1	4
3	Paraguay (PAR)*	1	1	0	2
4	Argentina (ARG)	1	0	1	2
5	Bolivia (BOL)	0	2	0	2
6	Chile (CHI)	0	0	2	2
Totals (6 entries)		5	5	5	15

Source: ASU2022 Medal Table - Tennis

=== Medalists ===
Event	Gold	Silver	Bronze
Men's singles	Facundo Díaz Acosta; Argentina	Gustavo Heide; Brazil	Alejandro Tabilo; Chile
Men's doubles	Brazil (BRA); Gustavo Heide; Orlando Luz	Bolivia (BOL); Boris Arias; Federico Zeballos	Argentina (ARG); Facundo Díaz Acosta; Tomás Farjat
Women's singles	María Herazo González; Colombia	Verónica Cepede; Paraguay	Yuliana Lizarazo; Colombia
Women's doubles	Colombia (COL); María Herazo González; Yuliana Lizarazo	Brazil (BRA); Ingrid Gamarra Martins; Rebeca Pereira	Chile (CHI); Daniela Seguel; Fernanda Labraña
Mixed doubles	Paraguay (PAR); Verónica Cepede; Daniel Vallejo	Bolivia (BOL); Noelia Zeballos; Federico Zeballos	Brazil (BRA); Ingrid Gamarra Martins; Orlando Luz
