= 2023 ITF Women's World Tennis Tour (October–December) =

The 2023 ITF Women's World Tennis Tour is the 2023 edition of the second-tier tour for women's professional tennis. It is organised by the International Tennis Federation and is a tier below the WTA Tour. The ITF Women's World Tennis Tour includes tournaments in six categories with prize money ranging from $15,000 up to $100,000.

== Key ==
Category
W100 tournaments
W80 tournaments
W60 tournaments
W40 tournaments
W25 tournaments
W15 tournaments

== Month ==
=== October ===
Week of	Tournament	Winner	Runners-up	Semifinalists	Quarterfinalists
October 2	Georgia's Rome Tennis Open 2 Rome, United States; Hard (i); W60; Singles – Doubles	(United States) McCartney Kessler; 6–2, 6–1	(United States) Grace Min	(Mexico) Renata Zarazúa (United States) Jamie Loeb	Anastasia Tikhonova (France) Elsa Jacquemot (United States) Ann Li (United States) Victoria Hu
October 2	Georgia's Rome Tennis Open 2 Rome, United States; Hard (i); W60; Singles – Doubles	(United States) Sofia Sewing; Anastasia Tikhonova; 4–6, 6–3, [10–7]	(United States) Robin Anderson (Mexico) Fernanda Contreras	(Mexico) Renata Zarazúa (United States) Jamie Loeb	Anastasia Tikhonova (France) Elsa Jacquemot (United States) Ann Li (United States) Victoria Hu
October 2	Lisboa Belém Open; Lisbon, Portugal; Clay; W40; Singles and doubles draws	(Ukraine) Katarina Zavatska; 6–3, 2–6, 7–5	(Bulgaria) Gergana Topalova	(Spain) Carlota Martínez Círez (Portugal) Francisca Jorge	(France) Alice Ramé (Spain) Guiomar Maristany (Czech Republic) Aneta Kučmová (Serbia) Dejana Radanović
October 2	Lisboa Belém Open; Lisbon, Portugal; Clay; W40; Singles and doubles draws	(Venezuela) Andrea Gámiz (Netherlands) Eva Vedder; 6–1, 6–2	(Germany) Tayisiya Morderger (Germany) Yana Morderger	(Spain) Carlota Martínez Círez (Portugal) Francisca Jorge	(France) Alice Ramé (Spain) Guiomar Maristany (Czech Republic) Aneta Kučmová (Serbia) Dejana Radanović
October 2	Cairns, Australia; Hard; W25; Singles and doubles draws	(Australia) Destanee Aiava; Walkover	(Australia) Lizette Cabrera	(Australia) Maddison Inglis (Australia) Gabriella Da Silva-Fick	(Japan) Yuki Naito (Australia) Taylah Preston (Australia) Talia Gibson (Australia) Ivana Popovic
October 2	Cairns, Australia; Hard; W25; Singles and doubles draws	(Japan) Yuki Naito (Japan) Naho Sato; 4–6, 6–3, [10–2]	(Australia) Lizette Cabrera (Australia) Maddison Inglis	(Australia) Maddison Inglis (Australia) Gabriella Da Silva-Fick	(Japan) Yuki Naito (Australia) Taylah Preston (Australia) Talia Gibson (Australia) Ivana Popovic
October 2	Makinohara, Japan; Carpet; W25; Singles and doubles draws	(Japan) Sara Saito; 6–4, 6–3	(Thailand) Thasaporn Naklo	(Japan) Shiho Akita (Japan) Rina Saigo	(Japan) Ayano Shimizu (Japan) Saki Imamura (Japan) Hiromi Abe (Chinese Taipei) Joanna Garland
October 2	Makinohara, Japan; Carpet; W25; Singles and doubles draws	(Japan) Hiromi Abe (Japan) Anri Nagata; 1–6, 7–5, [10–8]	(Japan) Rina Saigo (Japan) Yukina Saigo	(Japan) Shiho Akita (Japan) Rina Saigo	(Japan) Ayano Shimizu (Japan) Saki Imamura (Japan) Hiromi Abe (Chinese Taipei) Joanna Garland
October 2	Reims, France; Hard (i); W25; Singles and doubles draws	(Belgium) Alison Van Uytvanck; 6–4, 6–4	Julia Avdeeva	(Poland) Martyna Kubka (France) Margaux Rouvroy	(Switzerland) Valentina Ryser (France) Émeline Dartron (Germany) Mona Barthel (Romania) Patricia Maria Țig
October 2	Reims, France; Hard (i); W25; Singles and doubles draws	(Poland) Martyna Kubka (Sweden) Lisa Zaar; 6–3, 6–2	Julia Avdeeva; Anna Chekanskaya	(Poland) Martyna Kubka (France) Margaux Rouvroy	(Switzerland) Valentina Ryser (France) Émeline Dartron (Germany) Mona Barthel (Romania) Patricia Maria Țig
October 2	Baza, Spain; Hard; W25; Singles and doubles draws	(Croatia) Lea Bošković; 6–3, 6–2	Alina Charaeva	(Australia) Olivia Gadecki (Israel) Lina Glushko	(Greece) Sapfo Sakellaridi (Poland) Maja Chwalińska (Czech Republic) Gabriela Knutson (Switzerland) Susan Bandecchi
October 2	Baza, Spain; Hard; W25; Singles and doubles draws	(Australia) Olivia Gadecki (United Kingdom) Samantha Murray Sharan; 7–5, 4–6, [10–4]	(Croatia) Lea Bošković (Spain) Ángela Fita Boluda	(Australia) Olivia Gadecki (Israel) Lina Glushko	(Greece) Sapfo Sakellaridi (Poland) Maja Chwalińska (Czech Republic) Gabriela Knutson (Switzerland) Susan Bandecchi
October 2	Santa Margherita di Pula, Italy; Clay; W25; Singles and doubles draws	(Italy) Giorgia Pedone; 6–2, 7–5	(Spain) Ane Mintegi del Olmo	(Switzerland) Ylena In-Albon (Italy) Nuria Brancaccio	(Italy) Aurora Zantedeschi (Czech Republic) Nikola Bartůňková (Italy) Federica Urgesi (Italy) Dalila Spiteri
October 2	Santa Margherita di Pula, Italy; Clay; W25; Singles and doubles draws	(Slovenia) Veronika Erjavec (Lithuania) Justina Mikulskytė; 7–6^{(8–6)}, 6–0	(Italy) Nuria Brancaccio (Italy) Angelica Moratelli	(Switzerland) Ylena In-Albon (Italy) Nuria Brancaccio	(Italy) Aurora Zantedeschi (Czech Republic) Nikola Bartůňková (Italy) Federica Urgesi (Italy) Dalila Spiteri
October 2	Mendoza, Argentina; Clay; W25; Singles and doubles draws	(Argentina) Solana Sierra; 6–1, 6–3	(Argentina) Martina Capurro Taborda	(Mexico) Victoria Rodríguez (Argentina) Luisina Giovannini	(Argentina) Julieta Lara Estable (France) Séléna Janicijevic (Brazil) Carolina Alves (Italy) Nicole Fossa Huergo
October 2	Mendoza, Argentina; Clay; W25; Singles and doubles draws	(Peru) Romina Ccuno (Mexico) Victoria Rodríguez; 6–3, 6–3	(Italy) Nicole Fossa Huergo (Germany) Luisa Meyer auf der Heide	(Mexico) Victoria Rodríguez (Argentina) Luisina Giovannini	(Argentina) Julieta Lara Estable (France) Séléna Janicijevic (Brazil) Carolina Alves (Italy) Nicole Fossa Huergo
October 2	Redding, United States; Hard; W25; Singles and doubles draws	(United States) Iva Jovic; 6–4, 6–2	(Japan) Sayaka Ishii	(United States) Tyra Caterina Grant (United States) Hanna Chang	(United States) Kylie McKenzie (United States) Valerie Glozman (United States) Jessie Aney (United States) Elvina Kalieva
October 2	Redding, United States; Hard; W25; Singles and doubles draws	(United States) Liv Hovde (United States) Clervie Ngounoue; 6–3, 7–5	(Canada) Kayla Cross (Colombia) María Herazo González	(United States) Tyra Caterina Grant (United States) Hanna Chang	(United States) Kylie McKenzie (United States) Valerie Glozman (United States) Jessie Aney (United States) Elvina Kalieva
October 2	Šibenik, Croatia; Clay; W15; Singles and doubles draws	(Greece) Dimitra Pavlou; 7–5, 6–4	(Serbia) Jana Bojović	(Belgium) Lara Salden (Czech Republic) Denisa Hindová	(Czech Republic) Lucie Urbanová (Bulgaria) Iva Ivanova (Bosnia and Herzegovina) Suana Tucaković (France) Mathilde Ngijol Carré
October 2	Šibenik, Croatia; Clay; W15; Singles and doubles draws	(Montenegro) Tea Nikčević (Czech Republic) Lucie Urbanová; 7–5, 7–6^{(7–4)}	(Germany) Marie Vogt (Germany) Eva Marie Voracek	(Belgium) Lara Salden (Czech Republic) Denisa Hindová	(Czech Republic) Lucie Urbanová (Bulgaria) Iva Ivanova (Bosnia and Herzegovina) Suana Tucaković (France) Mathilde Ngijol Carré
October 2	Bad Waltersdorf, Austria; Clay; W15; Singles and doubles draws	(Serbia) Tamara Čurović; 6–4, 7–5	(Bulgaria) Julia Stamatova	(Czech Republic) Emma Slavíková (Slovakia) Eszter Méri	(Germany) Lara Schmidt (Romania) Ștefania Bojică (Romania) Anastasia Safta (Italy) Costanza Traversi
October 2	Bad Waltersdorf, Austria; Clay; W15; Singles and doubles draws	(Czech Republic) Denise Hrdinková (Slovakia) Laura Svatíková; 7–6^{(7–5)}, 6–2	(Serbia) Tamara Čurović (Slovakia) Nikola Daubnerová	(Czech Republic) Emma Slavíková (Slovakia) Eszter Méri	(Germany) Lara Schmidt (Romania) Ștefania Bojică (Romania) Anastasia Safta (Italy) Costanza Traversi
October 2	Sharm El Sheikh, Egypt; Hard; W15; Singles and doubles draws	(Egypt) Sandra Samir; 5–7, 6–3, 7–5	(Romania) Elena-Teodora Cadar	(Slovakia) Katarína Kužmová (Egypt) Lamis Alhussein Abdel Aziz	(Egypt) Merna Refaat; Evgeniya Burdina (Switzerland) Arlinda Rushiti (Serbia) Darja Suvirđonkova
October 2	Sharm El Sheikh, Egypt; Hard; W15; Singles and doubles draws	(Romania) Elena-Teodora Cadar (Switzerland) Arlinda Rushiti; 2–6, 6–3, [11–9]	Aleksandra Pospelova; Daria Zelinskaya	(Slovakia) Katarína Kužmová (Egypt) Lamis Alhussein Abdel Aziz	(Egypt) Merna Refaat; Evgeniya Burdina (Switzerland) Arlinda Rushiti (Serbia) Darja Suvirđonkova
October 2	Monastir, Tunisia; Hard; W15; Singles and doubles draws	(Poland) Gina Feistel; 6–1, 6–4	(Romania) Oana Gavrilă	(Netherlands) Marente Sijbesma (France) Marine Szostak	(France) Diana Martynov (India) Tanisha Kashyap (France) Astrid Lew Yan Foon (Germany) Emily Welker
October 2	Monastir, Tunisia; Hard; W15; Singles and doubles draws	(United Kingdom) Abigail Amos (Netherlands) Marente Sijbesma; 6–4, 6–1	(France) Flavie Brugnone (France) Astrid Lew Yan Foon	(Netherlands) Marente Sijbesma (France) Marine Szostak	(France) Diana Martynov (India) Tanisha Kashyap (France) Astrid Lew Yan Foon (Germany) Emily Welker
October 9	Rancho Santa Fe Open; Rancho Santa Fe, United States; Hard; W60; Singles – Doubles	(Ukraine) Yulia Starodubtseva; 7–5, 6–3	(Switzerland) Lulu Sun	Anastasia Tikhonova (China) Han Jiangxue	(Japan) Sayaka Ishii; Maria Kozyreva (United States) Louisa Chirico (United States) Eryn Cayetano
October 9	Rancho Santa Fe Open; Rancho Santa Fe, United States; Hard; W60; Singles – Doubles	(United States) Makenna Jones (Ukraine) Yulia Starodubtseva; 6–3, 4–6, [10–6]	Tatiana Prozorova (United States) Madison Sieg	Anastasia Tikhonova (China) Han Jiangxue	(Japan) Sayaka Ishii; Maria Kozyreva (United States) Louisa Chirico (United States) Eryn Cayetano
October 9	Shenzhen, China; Hard; W40; Singles and doubles draws	(Thailand) Thasaporn Naklo; 6–3, 7–5	(China) Shi Han	(China) Yao Xinxin (Thailand) Lanlana Tararudee	(France) Kristina Mladenovic (China) Yang Yidi (Chinese Taipei) Cho Yi-tsen (China) Na Dong
October 9	Shenzhen, China; Hard; W40; Singles and doubles draws	(Chinese Taipei) Cho I-hsuan (Chinese Taipei) Cho Yi-tsen; 7–5, 6–3	(China) Feng Shuo (China) Zheng Wushuang	(China) Yao Xinxin (Thailand) Lanlana Tararudee	(France) Kristina Mladenovic (China) Yang Yidi (Chinese Taipei) Cho Yi-tsen (China) Na Dong
October 9	Quinta do Lago, Portugal; Hard; W40; Singles and doubles draws	(Czech Republic) Gabriela Knutson; 6–4, 6–1	(United Kingdom) Harriet Dart	(Australia) Arina Rodionova (Romania) Elena-Gabriela Ruse	(United Kingdom) Eden Silva (United Kingdom) Heather Watson (Germany) Ella Seidel (Latvia) Darja Semeņistaja
October 9	Quinta do Lago, Portugal; Hard; W40; Singles and doubles draws	(Australia) Olivia Gadecki (United Kingdom) Heather Watson; 6–4, 6–1	(Portugal) Francisca Jorge (Portugal) Matilde Jorge	(Australia) Arina Rodionova (Romania) Elena-Gabriela Ruse	(United Kingdom) Eden Silva (United Kingdom) Heather Watson (Germany) Ella Seidel (Latvia) Darja Semeņistaja
October 9	Hamamatsu, Japan; Carpet; W25; Singles and doubles draws	(Chinese Taipei) Joanna Garland; 6–2, 4–6, 6–4	(Japan) Ayano Shimizu	(Japan) Haruka Kaji (Japan) Kyōka Okamura	(Japan) Funa Kozaki (Japan) Saki Imamura (Japan) Rina Saigo (Japan) Hiromi Abe
October 9	Hamamatsu, Japan; Carpet; W25; Singles and doubles draws	(Japan) Hiromi Abe (Japan) Natsumi Kawaguchi; 3–6, 6–4, [10–4]	(Japan) Haruna Arakawa (Japan) Aoi Ito	(Japan) Haruka Kaji (Japan) Kyōka Okamura	(Japan) Funa Kozaki (Japan) Saki Imamura (Japan) Rina Saigo (Japan) Hiromi Abe
October 9	Cairns, Australia; Hard; W25; Singles and doubles draws	(Australia) Taylah Preston; 6–4, 6–4	(Japan) Yuki Naito	(Australia) Destanee Aiava (Australia) Talia Gibson	(Japan) Erika Sema (Australia) Ivana Popovic (United States) Lea Ma (Australia) Gabriella Da Silva-Fick
October 9	Cairns, Australia; Hard; W25; Singles and doubles draws	(Australia) Destanee Aiava (Australia) Taylah Preston; 7–6^{(7–5)}, 7–5	(Australia) Roisin Gilheany (Australia) Alicia Smith	(Australia) Destanee Aiava (Australia) Talia Gibson	(Japan) Erika Sema (Australia) Ivana Popovic (United States) Lea Ma (Australia) Gabriella Da Silva-Fick
October 9	Santa Margherita di Pula, Italy; Clay; W25; Singles and doubles draws	(Czech Republic) Sára Bejlek; 6–4, 7–6^{(9–7)}	(Sweden) Caijsa Hennemann	(Italy) Federica Bilardo (Romania) Irina Bara	(United States) Vivian Wolff (Italy) Alessandra Mazzola (Italy) Anastasia Abbagnato (Ukraine) Oleksandra Oliynykova
October 9	Santa Margherita di Pula, Italy; Clay; W25; Singles and doubles draws	(Italy) Eleonora Alvisi (Italy) Nuria Brancaccio; 6–2, 2–6, [10–6]	(Italy) Anastasia Abbagnato (Italy) Virginia Ferrara	(Italy) Federica Bilardo (Romania) Irina Bara	(United States) Vivian Wolff (Italy) Alessandra Mazzola (Italy) Anastasia Abbagnato (Ukraine) Oleksandra Oliynykova
October 9	Seville, Spain; Clay; W25; Singles and doubles draws	(Czech Republic) Dominika Šalková; 6–4, 6–3	(France) Loïs Boisson	(Greece) Sapfo Sakellaridi (Argentina) Guillermina Naya	(Bulgaria) Julia Stamatova (Mexico) María Portillo Ramírez (Spain) Andrea Lázaro García (Czech Republic) Aneta Kučmová
October 9	Seville, Spain; Clay; W25; Singles and doubles draws	(Ukraine) Maryna Kolb (Ukraine) Nadiya Kolb; 6–1, 6–1	(Romania) Cristina Dinu (Greece) Sapfo Sakellaridi	(Greece) Sapfo Sakellaridi (Argentina) Guillermina Naya	(Bulgaria) Julia Stamatova (Mexico) María Portillo Ramírez (Spain) Andrea Lázaro García (Czech Republic) Aneta Kučmová
October 9	Florence, United States; Hard; W25; Singles and doubles draws	(United States) Fiona Crawley; 7–5, 6–1	(United States) Chloe Beck	(United States) Whitney Osuigwe (United States) Tyra Caterina Grant	(Hungary) Panna Udvardy (Germany) Alexandra Vecic (United States) Maria Mateas (Israel) Nicole Khirin
October 9	Florence, United States; Hard; W25; Singles and doubles draws	(United States) Abigail Rencheli (United States) Alana Smith; 3–6, 7–6^{(11–9)}, [10–6]	(United States) Ayana Akli (Israel) Nicole Khirin	(United States) Whitney Osuigwe (United States) Tyra Caterina Grant	(Hungary) Panna Udvardy (Germany) Alexandra Vecic (United States) Maria Mateas (Israel) Nicole Khirin
October 9	Hua Hin, Thailand; Hard; W15; Singles and doubles draws	(Thailand) Patcharin Cheapchandej; 6–3, 6–2	(Thailand) Salakthip Ounmuang	(India) Shrivalli Bhamidipaty (Slovakia) Laura Cíleková	(Thailand) Watsachol Sawatdee; Valery Gynina (South Korea) Kang Na-hyun (Thailand) Punnin Kovapitukted
October 9	Hua Hin, Thailand; Hard; W15; Singles and doubles draws	(Thailand) Patcharin Cheapchandej (Thailand) Punnin Kovapitukted; 7–6^{(7–2)}, 7–5	(China) Sun Yifan (China) Zhang Jin	(India) Shrivalli Bhamidipaty (Slovakia) Laura Cíleková	(Thailand) Watsachol Sawatdee; Valery Gynina (South Korea) Kang Na-hyun (Thailand) Punnin Kovapitukted
October 9	Sharm El Sheikh, Egypt; Hard; W15; Singles and doubles draws	(Slovakia) Katarína Kužmová; 6–2, 6–0	(Romania) Elena-Teodora Cadar	(Slovakia) Salma Drugdová (Lithuania) Klaudija Bubelytė	Daria Zelinskaya (Egypt) Yasmin Ezzat (Germany) Maya Drozd (Romania) Karola Patricia Bejenaru
October 9	Sharm El Sheikh, Egypt; Hard; W15; Singles and doubles draws	(Romania) Karola Patricia Bejenaru (Romania) Elena-Teodora Cadar; 6–3, 6–4	Aleksandra Pospelova; Daria Zelinskaya	(Slovakia) Salma Drugdová (Lithuania) Klaudija Bubelytė	Daria Zelinskaya (Egypt) Yasmin Ezzat (Germany) Maya Drozd (Romania) Karola Patricia Bejenaru
October 9	Monastir, Tunisia; Hard; W15; Singles and doubles draws	(India) Zeel Desai; 6–2, 6–4	(United States) Hina Inoue	(France) Helena Stevic (Romania) Oana Gavrilă	(Poland) Xenia Bandurowska (Switzerland) Naïma Karamoko (Germany) Anja Wildgruber (France) Margaux Komano
October 9	Monastir, Tunisia; Hard; W15; Singles and doubles draws	(United Kingdom) Abigail Amos (Netherlands) Marente Sijbesma; 1–6, 6–2, [12–10]	(Poland) Xenia Bandurowska (Ukraine) Mariia Bergen	(France) Helena Stevic (Romania) Oana Gavrilă	(Poland) Xenia Bandurowska (Switzerland) Naïma Karamoko (Germany) Anja Wildgruber (France) Margaux Komano
October 16	Shenzhen Longhua Open; Shenzhen, China; Hard; W100; Singles – Doubles	(China) Bai Zhuoxuan; 7–6^{(7–5)}, 6–2	(China) Yuan Yue	(Canada) Carol Zhao; Sofya Lansere	(France) Kristina Mladenovic (Hungary) Tímea Babos (Thailand) Lanlana Tararudee (Hong Kong) Eudice Chong
October 16	Shenzhen Longhua Open; Shenzhen, China; Hard; W100; Singles – Doubles	(France) Kristina Mladenovic (Japan) Moyuka Uchijima; 6–2, 7–5	(Hungary) Tímea Babos (Ukraine) Kateryna Volodko	(Canada) Carol Zhao; Sofya Lansere	(France) Kristina Mladenovic (Hungary) Tímea Babos (Thailand) Lanlana Tararudee (Hong Kong) Eudice Chong
October 16	GB Pro-Series Shrewsbury; Shrewsbury, United Kingdom; Hard (i); W100; Singles – Doubles	(Switzerland) Viktorija Golubic; 6–0, 6–0	(United Kingdom) Amarni Banks	(Netherlands) Suzan Lamens (France) Océane Dodin	(United Kingdom) Francesca Jones (Australia) Olivia Gadecki (Switzerland) Simona Waltert (United Kingdom) Hannah Klugman
October 16	GB Pro-Series Shrewsbury; Shrewsbury, United Kingdom; Hard (i); W100; Singles – Doubles	(United Kingdom) Harriet Dart (Australia) Olivia Gadecki; 6–0, 6–2	(Estonia) Elena Malõgina (Czech Republic) Barbora Palicová	(Netherlands) Suzan Lamens (France) Océane Dodin	(United Kingdom) Francesca Jones (Australia) Olivia Gadecki (Switzerland) Simona Waltert (United Kingdom) Hannah Klugman
October 16	Mercer Tennis Classic; Macon, United States; Hard; W80; Singles – Doubles	(United States) Taylor Townsend; 6–3, 6–4	(Hungary) Panna Udvardy	(United States) Katie Volynets (United States) Kayla Day	(United States) Makenna Jones (Mexico) Renata Zarazúa (Cyprus) Raluca Șerban (United States) Alexa Noel
October 16	Mercer Tennis Classic; Macon, United States; Hard; W80; Singles – Doubles	Jana Kolodynska; Tatiana Prozorova; 6–3, 6–2	(United States) Sofia Sewing; Anastasia Tikhonova	(United States) Katie Volynets (United States) Kayla Day	(United States) Makenna Jones (Mexico) Renata Zarazúa (Cyprus) Raluca Șerban (United States) Alexa Noel
October 16	Hamburg Ladies & Gents Cup; Hamburg, Germany; Hard (i); W60; Singles – Doubles	Julia Avdeeva; 6–4, 7–6^{(7–2)}	(Germany) Ella Seidel	(Croatia) Lea Bošković; Alevtina Ibragimova	Ekaterina Maklakova (Belgium) Eliessa Vanlangendonck (Germany) Lara Schmidt (Germany) Mona Barthel
October 16	Hamburg Ladies & Gents Cup; Hamburg, Germany; Hard (i); W60; Singles – Doubles	(Germany) Tayisiya Morderger (Germany) Yana Morderger; 6–1, 6–4	Julia Avdeeva; Ekaterina Maklakova	(Croatia) Lea Bošković; Alevtina Ibragimova	Ekaterina Maklakova (Belgium) Eliessa Vanlangendonck (Germany) Lara Schmidt (Germany) Mona Barthel
October 16	Challenger Banque Nationale de Saguenay; Saguenay, Canada; Hard (i); W60; Singles – Doubles	(Canada) Katherine Sebov; 6–4, 6–4	(Hungary) Fanny Stollár	(Canada) Isabelle Boulais (Australia) Arina Rodionova	(Canada) Victoria Mboko (United States) Madison Sieg (United States) Robin Anderson (Lithuania) Justina Mikulskytė
October 16	Challenger Banque Nationale de Saguenay; Saguenay, Canada; Hard (i); W60; Singles – Doubles	(United States) Robin Anderson (United States) Dalayna Hewitt; 6–1, 6–4	(Canada) Mia Kupres (Denmark) Johanne Svendsen	(Canada) Isabelle Boulais (Australia) Arina Rodionova	(Canada) Victoria Mboko (United States) Madison Sieg (United States) Robin Anderson (Lithuania) Justina Mikulskytė
October 16	Cherbourg-en-Cotentin, France; Hard (i); W25+ Singles and doubles draws	(Ukraine) Veronika Podrez; 6–4, 2–6, 6–4	(France) Alice Robbe	Elena Pridankina (France) Amandine Hesse	(France) Diana Martynov (France) Audrey Albié (Finland) Anastasia Kulikova (France) Alice Ramé
October 16	Cherbourg-en-Cotentin, France; Hard (i); W25+ Singles and doubles draws	(Poland) Martyna Kubka (Kazakhstan) Zhibek Kulambayeva; 6–0, 6–3	(France) Yasmine Mansouri (Belgium) Lara Salden	Elena Pridankina (France) Amandine Hesse	(France) Diana Martynov (France) Audrey Albié (Finland) Anastasia Kulikova (France) Alice Ramé
October 16	Santa Margherita di Pula, Italy; Clay; W25; Singles and doubles draws	(Slovenia) Veronika Erjavec; 2–6, 6–4, 7–5	(Spain) Leyre Romero Gormaz	(Serbia) Lola Radivojević (Italy) Nuria Brancaccio	(Italy) Anastasia Abbagnato (Romania) Cristina Dinu (Croatia) Tena Lukas (Ukraine) Oleksandra Oliynykova
October 16	Santa Margherita di Pula, Italy; Clay; W25; Singles and doubles draws	(Italy) Martina Colmegna (Italy) Lisa Pigato; 6–4, 7–5	(Slovenia) Nika Radišić (Bosnia and Herzegovina) Anita Wagner	(Serbia) Lola Radivojević (Italy) Nuria Brancaccio	(Italy) Anastasia Abbagnato (Romania) Cristina Dinu (Croatia) Tena Lukas (Ukraine) Oleksandra Oliynykova
October 16	Faro, Portugal; Hard; W25; Singles and doubles draws	(France) Harmony Tan; 6–0, 6–2	(France) Manon Léonard	(Ukraine) Nadiya Kolb (Bosnia and Herzegovina) Nefisa Berberović	Anastasia Grechkina (Croatia) Antonia Ružić (Netherlands) Stéphanie Judith Visscher; Daria Khomutsianskaya
October 16	Faro, Portugal; Hard; W25; Singles and doubles draws	(Ukraine) Maryna Kolb (Ukraine) Nadiya Kolb; 6–4, 6–3	(Latvia) Diāna Marcinkēviča (Greece) Sapfo Sakellaridi	(Ukraine) Nadiya Kolb (Bosnia and Herzegovina) Nefisa Berberović	Anastasia Grechkina (Croatia) Antonia Ružić (Netherlands) Stéphanie Judith Visscher; Daria Khomutsianskaya
October 16	Hua Hin, Thailand; Hard; W15; Singles and doubles draws	(Japan) Ayumi Koshiishi; 6–2, 6–1	(India) Shrivalli Bhamidipaty	(Thailand) Punnin Kovapitukted (Thailand) Patcharin Cheapchandej	(Thailand) Anchisa Chanta (Japan) Hiroko Kuwata; Valery Gynina (Thailand) Salakthip Ounmuang
October 16	Hua Hin, Thailand; Hard; W15; Singles and doubles draws	(Thailand) Anchisa Chanta (Japan) Ayumi Koshiishi; 4–6, 6–4, [10–5]	(China) Cao Yajing (Hong Kong) Maggie Ng	(Thailand) Punnin Kovapitukted (Thailand) Patcharin Cheapchandej	(Thailand) Anchisa Chanta (Japan) Hiroko Kuwata; Valery Gynina (Thailand) Salakthip Ounmuang
October 16	Heraklion, Greece; Clay; W15; Singles and doubles draws	(Morocco) Aya El Aouni; 2–6, 6–4, 6–3	(Spain) Claudia Hoste Ferrer	(Bulgaria) Rositsa Dencheva (Germany) Mara Guth	Milana Zhabrailova (Germany) Jana Vanik (Romania) Simona Ogescu (Germany) Eva Marie Voracek
October 16	Heraklion, Greece; Clay; W15; Singles and doubles draws	(Italy) Matilde Mariani (Italy) Gaia Squarcialupi; 1–6, 7–5, [10–7]	(Slovenia) Ela Nala Milić (Czech Republic) Amélie Šmejkalová	(Bulgaria) Rositsa Dencheva (Germany) Mara Guth	Milana Zhabrailova (Germany) Jana Vanik (Romania) Simona Ogescu (Germany) Eva Marie Voracek
October 16	Sharm El Sheikh, Egypt; Hard; W15; Singles and doubles draws	(Latvia) Kamilla Bartone; 7–5, 2–6, 7–5	(Egypt) Lamis Abdel Aziz	Alisa Kummel (Germany) Maya Drozd	(Kazakhstan) Sandugash Kenzhibayeva (Luxembourg) Marie Weckerle (Ukraine) Kateryna Lazarenko (Netherlands) Isis Louise van den Broek
October 16	Sharm El Sheikh, Egypt; Hard; W15; Singles and doubles draws	(Latvia) Kamilla Bartone (Uzbekistan) Sevil Yuldasheva; 6–2, 6–3	Alisa Kummel; Ekaterina Makarova	Alisa Kummel (Germany) Maya Drozd	(Kazakhstan) Sandugash Kenzhibayeva (Luxembourg) Marie Weckerle (Ukraine) Kateryna Lazarenko (Netherlands) Isis Louise van den Broek
October 16	Monastir, Tunisia; Hard; W15; Singles and doubles draws	(United States) Hina Inoue; 6–3, 6–2	(Benin) Gloriana Nahum	(Brazil) Camilla Bossi (India) Zeel Desai	(Austria) Arabella Koller (Mexico) Lya Olivares (Germany) Anja Wildgruber (France) Helena Stevic
October 16	Monastir, Tunisia; Hard; W15; Singles and doubles draws	(India) Zeel Desai; Anastasia Sukhotina; 6–4, 6–7^{(11–13)}, [10–7]	(Austria) Arabella Koller (Italy) Camilla Zanolini	(Brazil) Camilla Bossi (India) Zeel Desai	(Austria) Arabella Koller (Mexico) Lya Olivares (Germany) Anja Wildgruber (France) Helena Stevic
October 16	Jackson, United States; Hard; W15; Singles and doubles draws	(Japan) Ayumi Miyamoto; 6–3, 1–6, 7–5	(Argentina) Lucía Peyre	(United States) Carolyn Ansari (Hungary) Panna Bartha	(United States) Taylor Cataldi (Poland) Anna Hertel (Peru) Lucciana Pérez Alarcón (Spain) Carolina Gómez
October 16	Jackson, United States; Hard; W15; Singles and doubles draws	(Chinese Taipei) Hsu Chieh-yu (Ukraine) Anita Sahdiieva; 7–5, 6–3	(United States) Adeline Flach (Kenya) Angella Okutoyi	(United States) Carolyn Ansari (Hungary) Panna Bartha	(United States) Taylor Cataldi (Poland) Anna Hertel (Peru) Lucciana Pérez Alarcón (Spain) Carolina Gómez
October 23	Torneig Internacional Els Gorchs; Les Franqueses del Vallès, Spain; Hard; W100; Singles – Doubles	(Poland) Magdalena Fręch; 7–5, 4–6, 6–4	(Italy) Sara Errani	(Hungary) Dalma Gálfi (Bulgaria) Viktoriya Tomova	(Netherlands) Arantxa Rus (Czech Republic) Linda Fruhvirtová (France) Nahia Berecoechea (Israel) Lina Glushko
October 23	Torneig Internacional Els Gorchs; Les Franqueses del Vallès, Spain; Hard; W100; Singles – Doubles	(Italy) Angelica Moratelli (Italy) Camilla Rosatello; 4–6, 7–5, [10–6]	(China) Gao Xinyu (Latvia) Darja Semeņistaja	(Hungary) Dalma Gálfi (Bulgaria) Viktoriya Tomova	(Netherlands) Arantxa Rus (Czech Republic) Linda Fruhvirtová (France) Nahia Berecoechea (Israel) Lina Glushko
October 23	Internationaux Féminins de la Vienne; Poitiers, France; Hard (i); W80; Singles – Doubles	(France) Jessika Ponchet; 3–6, 6–3, 7–6^{(7–2)}	(Germany) Anna-Lena Friedsam	(France) Léolia Jeanjean (Japan) Mai Hontama	(Poland) Katarzyna Kawa (France) Émeline Dartron (France) Elsa Jacquemot (France) Océane Dodin
October 23	Internationaux Féminins de la Vienne; Poitiers, France; Hard (i); W80; Singles – Doubles	(France) Jessika Ponchet (Netherlands) Bibiane Schoofs; 7–5, 6–4	Ekaterina Maklakova; Elena Pridankina	(France) Léolia Jeanjean (Japan) Mai Hontama	(Poland) Katarzyna Kawa (France) Émeline Dartron (France) Elsa Jacquemot (France) Océane Dodin
October 23	Christus Health Pro Challenge; Tyler, United States; Hard; W80; Singles – Doubles	(United States) Emma Navarro; 6–3, 6–4	(United States) Kayla Day	(United States) Allie Kiick (United States) Ayana Akli	(China) Tian Fangran (United States) Alana Smith (United States) Victoria Hu; Maria Kozyreva
October 23	Christus Health Pro Challenge; Tyler, United States; Hard; W80; Singles – Doubles	(United Kingdom) Amelia Rajecki (United States) Abigail Rencheli; 7–5, 4–6, [16–14]	(United States) Anna Rogers (United States) Alana Smith	(United States) Allie Kiick (United States) Ayana Akli	(China) Tian Fangran (United States) Alana Smith (United States) Victoria Hu; Maria Kozyreva
October 23	City of Playford Tennis International; City of Playford, Australia; Hard; W60; Singles – Doubles	(Australia) Astra Sharma; 7–6^{(8–6)}, 6–0	(Chinese Taipei) Joanna Garland	(Australia) Taylah Preston (China) Ma Yexin	(Australia) Kimberly Birrell (Australia) Jaimee Fourlis (Japan) Chihiro Muramatsu (Australia) Seone Mendez
October 23	City of Playford Tennis International; City of Playford, Australia; Hard; W60; Singles – Doubles	(Australia) Talia Gibson (Australia) Priscilla Hon; 6–1, 6–2	(Australia) Kaylah McPhee (Australia) Astra Sharma	(Australia) Taylah Preston (China) Ma Yexin	(Australia) Kimberly Birrell (Australia) Jaimee Fourlis (Japan) Chihiro Muramatsu (Australia) Seone Mendez
October 23	GB Pro-Series Glasgow; Glasgow, Great Britain; Hard (i); W60; Singles – Doubles	(Ukraine) Daria Snigur; 6–4, 6–4	(Germany) Mona Barthel	(United Kingdom) Mingge Xu (United Kingdom) Harriet Dart	(United Kingdom) Hannah Klugman (United Kingdom) Yuriko Miyazaki (Sweden) Kajsa Rinaldo Persson (United Kingdom) Anna Brogan
October 23	GB Pro-Series Glasgow; Glasgow, Great Britain; Hard (i); W60; Singles – Doubles	(Portugal) Francisca Jorge (United Kingdom) Maia Lumsden; 6–3, 6–1	(United Kingdom) Freya Christie (Australia) Olivia Gadecki	(United Kingdom) Mingge Xu (United Kingdom) Harriet Dart	(United Kingdom) Hannah Klugman (United Kingdom) Yuriko Miyazaki (Sweden) Kajsa Rinaldo Persson (United Kingdom) Anna Brogan
October 23	Tevlin Women's Challenger; Toronto, Canada; Hard (i); W60; Singles – Doubles	(Canada) Marina Stakusic; 3–6, 7–5, 6–3	(Croatia) Jana Fett	(Canada) Victoria Mboko (Lithuania) Justina Mikulskytė	(Japan) Haruka Kaji (United States) Louisa Chirico (Switzerland) Lulu Sun (Australia) Arina Rodionova
October 23	Tevlin Women's Challenger; Toronto, Canada; Hard (i); W60; Singles – Doubles	(United States) Carmen Corley (United States) Ivana Corley; 6–7^{(6–8)}, 6–3, [10–3]	(Canada) Kayla Cross (United States) Liv Hovde	(Canada) Victoria Mboko (Lithuania) Justina Mikulskytė	(Japan) Haruka Kaji (United States) Louisa Chirico (Switzerland) Lulu Sun (Australia) Arina Rodionova
October 23	Qiandaohu, China; Hard; W25; Singles and doubles draws	Anastasiia Gureva; 2–6, 7–6^{(8–6)}, 6–3	(China) Wei Sijia	(Thailand) Mananchaya Sawangkaew (Liechtenstein) Kathinka von Deichmann	(China) Guo Meiqi (Thailand) Punnin Kovapitukted (China) Wang Jiaqi (China) Yuan Chengyiyi
October 23	Qiandaohu, China; Hard; W25; Singles and doubles draws	Anastasiia Gureva (Georgia (country)) Sofia Shapatava; 6–2, 4–6, [10–4]	(China) Feng Shuo (China) Zheng Wushuang	(Thailand) Mananchaya Sawangkaew (Liechtenstein) Kathinka von Deichmann	(China) Guo Meiqi (Thailand) Punnin Kovapitukted (China) Wang Jiaqi (China) Yuan Chengyiyi
October 23	Istanbul, Turkey; Hard (i); W25; Singles and doubles draws	(Finland) Anastasia Kulikova; 6–4, 3–6, 6–1	(Poland) Martyna Kubka	Anastasia Zakharova (Turkey) Ayla Aksu	(Turkey) Başak Eraydın; Ekaterina Ovcharenko (Serbia) Elena Milovanović (Serbia) Dejana Radanović
October 23	Istanbul, Turkey; Hard (i); W25; Singles and doubles draws	Ekaterina Yashina; Anastasia Zakharova; 6–3, 6–4	(Slovenia) Dalila Jakupović (Bosnia and Herzegovina) Anita Wagner	Anastasia Zakharova (Turkey) Ayla Aksu	(Turkey) Başak Eraydın; Ekaterina Ovcharenko (Serbia) Elena Milovanović (Serbia) Dejana Radanović
October 23	Heraklion, Greece; Clay; W25; Singles and doubles draws	(Romania) Irina Bara; 6–2, 6–1	(Romania) Andreea Mitu	(France) Diane Parry (Romania) Anca Todoni	(Germany) Marie Vogt (Switzerland) Leonie Küng (France) Séléna Janicijevic (Poland) Maja Chwalińska
October 23	Heraklion, Greece; Clay; W25; Singles and doubles draws	(Romania) Ilinca Amariei (Romania) Anca Todoni; 6–0, 5–7, [10–1]	(Austria) Melanie Klaffner (Austria) Sinja Kraus	(France) Diane Parry (Romania) Anca Todoni	(Germany) Marie Vogt (Switzerland) Leonie Küng (France) Séléna Janicijevic (Poland) Maja Chwalińska
October 23	Sharm El Sheikh, Egypt; Hard; W25; Singles and doubles draws	(Greece) Valentini Grammatikopoulou; 7–6^{(7–1)}, 7–5	(Czech Republic) Linda Klimovičová	Marina Melnikova (Slovakia) Salma Drugdová	(Romania) Karola Patricia Bejenaru; Alexandra Shubladze (Egypt) Yasmin Ezzat (Switzerland) Jenny Dürst
October 23	Sharm El Sheikh, Egypt; Hard; W25; Singles and doubles draws	(Romania) Karola Patricia Bejenaru (France) Yasmine Mansouri; 6–2, 7–6^{(7–5)}	(Slovakia) Katarína Kužmová; Ekaterina Shalimova	Marina Melnikova (Slovakia) Salma Drugdová	(Romania) Karola Patricia Bejenaru; Alexandra Shubladze (Egypt) Yasmin Ezzat (Switzerland) Jenny Dürst
October 23	Santa Margherita di Pula, Italy; Clay; W25; Singles and doubles draws	(Czech Republic) Brenda Fruhvirtová; 6–4, 6–3	(Argentina) Guillermina Naya	(Ukraine) Oleksandra Oliynykova (Italy) Martina Colmegna	(Italy) Tatiana Pieri (Spain) Carlota Martínez Círez (Italy) Anna Turati (Switzerland) Ylena In-Albon
October 23	Santa Margherita di Pula, Italy; Clay; W25; Singles and doubles draws	(Italy) Martina Colmegna (Argentina) Guillermina Naya; 6–2, 6–7^{(6–8)}, [10–8]	(Germany) Katharina Hobgarski (Switzerland) Ylena In-Albon	(Ukraine) Oleksandra Oliynykova (Italy) Martina Colmegna	(Italy) Tatiana Pieri (Spain) Carlota Martínez Círez (Italy) Anna Turati (Switzerland) Ylena In-Albon
October 23	Loulé, Portugal; Hard; W25; Singles and doubles draws	(Czech Republic) Dominika Šalková; 6–1, 6–2	(Italy) Silvia Ambrosio	(France) Manon Léonard (Hungary) Natália Szabanin	(Latvia) Diāna Marcinkēviča (France) Sarah Iliev (Belgium) Hanne Vandewinkel (France) Harmony Tan
October 23	Loulé, Portugal; Hard; W25; Singles and doubles draws	(Czech Republic) Dominika Šalková (Hungary) Natália Szabanin; 4–6, 6–2, [10–1]	Daria Khomutsianskaya; Evialina Laskevich	(France) Manon Léonard (Hungary) Natália Szabanin	(Latvia) Diāna Marcinkēviča (France) Sarah Iliev (Belgium) Hanne Vandewinkel (France) Harmony Tan
October 23	Villena, Spain; Hard; W15; Singles and doubles draws	(Italy) Anastasia Abbagnato; 6–1, 6–2	(United States) Adriana Reami	(Finland) Ella Haavisto (Germany) Joëlle Steur	(Spain) Celia Cerviño Ruiz (Germany) Antonia Schmidt; Arina Arifullina (Spain) Cristina Díaz Adrover
October 23	Villena, Spain; Hard; W15; Singles and doubles draws	(Lithuania) Andrė Lukošiūtė (Lithuania) Patricija Paukštytė; 6–4, 2–6, [10–7]	(Germany) Laura Böhner (Germany) Joëlle Steur	(Finland) Ella Haavisto (Germany) Joëlle Steur	(Spain) Celia Cerviño Ruiz (Germany) Antonia Schmidt; Arina Arifullina (Spain) Cristina Díaz Adrover
October 23	Monastir, Tunisia; Hard; W15; Singles and doubles draws	(Romania) Ioana Zvonaru; 6–4, 6–4	(France) Emmanuelle Girard	(Germany) Anja Wildgruber (Bulgaria) Rositsa Dencheva	(Serbia) Tamara Čurović (Belgium) Amelia Waligora; Polina Kaibekova (Mexico) Lya Isabel Fernández
October 23	Monastir, Tunisia; Hard; W15; Singles and doubles draws	(Germany) Alicia Melosch (Germany) Johanna Silva; Walkover	(Serbia) Tamara Čurović (Belgium) Amelia Waligora	(Germany) Anja Wildgruber (Bulgaria) Rositsa Dencheva	(Serbia) Tamara Čurović (Belgium) Amelia Waligora; Polina Kaibekova (Mexico) Lya Isabel Fernández
October 30	NSW Open; Sydney, Australia; Hard; W60; Singles – Doubles	(Australia) Destanee Aiava; 6–3, 6–4	(Australia) Astra Sharma	(Australia) Maya Joint (Japan) Hikaru Sato	(South Korea) Jang Su-jeong (Australia) Jaimee Fourlis (Japan) Moyuka Uchijima (Japan) Kyōka Okamura
October 30	NSW Open; Sydney, Australia; Hard; W60; Singles – Doubles	(Australia) Destanee Aiava (Australia) Maddison Inglis; 6–0, 6–0	(Japan) Kyōka Okamura (Japan) Ayano Shimizu	(Australia) Maya Joint (Japan) Hikaru Sato	(South Korea) Jang Su-jeong (Australia) Jaimee Fourlis (Japan) Moyuka Uchijima (Japan) Kyōka Okamura
October 30	Slovak Open; Bratislava, Slovakia; Hard (i); W60; Singles – Doubles	(Germany) Ella Seidel; 6–4, 7–6^{(7–4)}	Sofya Lansere	(Croatia) Lea Bošković (Slovakia) Renáta Jamrichová	(Slovakia) Mia Pohánková (Germany) Jule Niemeier (Hungary) Dalma Gálfi (France) Chloé Paquet
October 30	Slovak Open; Bratislava, Slovakia; Hard (i); W60; Singles – Doubles	(France) Estelle Cascino (Czech Republic) Jesika Malečková; 6–3, 6–2	(Czech Republic) Denisa Hindová (Czech Republic) Karolína Kubáňová	(Croatia) Lea Bošković (Slovakia) Renáta Jamrichová	(Slovakia) Mia Pohánková (Germany) Jule Niemeier (Hungary) Dalma Gálfi (France) Chloé Paquet
October 30	Open Nantes Atlantique; Nantes, France; Hard (i); W60; Singles – Doubles	(France) Océane Dodin; 6–7^{(2–7)}, 6–3, 6–2	(Czech Republic) Gabriela Knutson	(France) Elsa Jacquemot (Philippines) Alex Eala	(France) Harmony Tan; Polina Kudermetova (France) Léolia Jeanjean (United Kingdom) Yuriko Miyazaki
October 30	Open Nantes Atlantique; Nantes, France; Hard (i); W60; Singles – Doubles	(United Kingdom) Ali Collins (United Kingdom) Yuriko Miyazaki; 7–6^{(7–4)}, 6–2	(United Kingdom) Emily Appleton (Netherlands) Isabelle Haverlag	(France) Elsa Jacquemot (Philippines) Alex Eala	(France) Harmony Tan; Polina Kudermetova (France) Léolia Jeanjean (United Kingdom) Yuriko Miyazaki
October 30	Heraklion, Greece; Clay; W40; Singles and doubles draws	(Austria) Sinja Kraus; 6–2, 4–6, 6–4	(France) Diane Parry	(Romania) Cristina Dinu (Czech Republic) Brenda Fruhvirtová	(Croatia) Tena Lukas (Romania) Anca Todoni (North Macedonia) Lina Gjorcheska (Romania) Irina Bara
October 30	Heraklion, Greece; Clay; W40; Singles and doubles draws	(Romania) Irina Bara (Slovenia) Dalila Jakupović; 3–6, 7–6^{(8–6)}, [10–8]	(Romania) Oana Gavrilă (Greece) Sapfo Sakellaridi	(Romania) Cristina Dinu (Czech Republic) Brenda Fruhvirtová	(Croatia) Tena Lukas (Romania) Anca Todoni (North Macedonia) Lina Gjorcheska (Romania) Irina Bara
October 30	Solarino, Italy; Carpet; W25; Singles and doubles draws	(Italy) Lisa Pigato; 1–6, 6–2, 6–3	(Italy) Dalila Spiteri	(United Kingdom) Emilie Lindh; Julia Avdeeva	(Switzerland) Ylena In-Albon (Romania) Georgia Crăciun (Italy) Giorgia Pedone (Germany) Antonia Schmidt
October 30	Solarino, Italy; Carpet; W25; Singles and doubles draws	(United States) Jessie Aney (Germany) Lena Papadakis; 6–3, 3–6, [10–6]	(Italy) Giorgia Pedone (Italy) Lisa Pigato	(United Kingdom) Emilie Lindh; Julia Avdeeva	(Switzerland) Ylena In-Albon (Romania) Georgia Crăciun (Italy) Giorgia Pedone (Germany) Antonia Schmidt
October 30	Monastir, Tunisia; Hard; W25; Singles and doubles draws	Alina Charaeva; 7–5, 6–3	Maria Bondarenko	(China) Gao Xinyu (Switzerland) Susan Bandecchi	Anastasia Sukhotina; Aliona Falei (Belgium) Eilessa Vanlangendonck; Veronika Miroshnichenko
October 30	Monastir, Tunisia; Hard; W25; Singles and doubles draws	(China) Gao Xinyu (Kazakhstan) Zhibek Kulambayeva; 6–0, 2–6, [10–7]	Aliona Falei; Polina Iatcenko	(China) Gao Xinyu (Switzerland) Susan Bandecchi	Anastasia Sukhotina; Aliona Falei (Belgium) Eilessa Vanlangendonck; Veronika Miroshnichenko
October 30	GB Pro-Series Sunderland; Sunderland, Great Britain; Hard (i); W25; Singles and doubles draws	(Switzerland) Valentina Ryser; 6–4, 7–5	(Estonia) Elena Malõgina	(Czech Republic) Barbora Palicová (United Kingdom) Katie Swan	(Ukraine) Alisa Baranovska (United Kingdom) Mika Stojsavljevic (Czech Republic) Dominika Šalková (Germany) Julia Middendorf
October 30	GB Pro-Series Sunderland; Sunderland, Great Britain; Hard (i); W25; Singles and doubles draws	(United Kingdom) Freya Christie (Estonia) Elena Malõgina; 6–0, 4–6, [10–4]	(Georgia (country)) Mariam Bolkvadze (United Kingdom) Samantha Murray Sharan	(Czech Republic) Barbora Palicová (United Kingdom) Katie Swan	(Ukraine) Alisa Baranovska (United Kingdom) Mika Stojsavljevic (Czech Republic) Dominika Šalková (Germany) Julia Middendorf
October 30	Edmonton, Canada; Hard (i); W25; Singles and doubles draws	(Australia) Arina Rodionova; 6–3, 7–5	(Netherlands) Lesley Pattinama Kerkhove	(Lithuania) Justina Mikulskytė (Japan) Mana Kawamura	(Poland) Urszula Radwańska (United States) Kylie McKenzie (Hungary) Fanny Stollár (United States) Liv Hovde
October 30	Edmonton, Canada; Hard (i); W25; Singles and doubles draws	(Canada) Kayla Cross (United States) Liv Hovde; 4–6, 6–4, [10–7]	(United States) Allura Zamarripa (United States) Maribella Zamarripa	(Lithuania) Justina Mikulskytė (Japan) Mana Kawamura	(Poland) Urszula Radwańska (United States) Kylie McKenzie (Hungary) Fanny Stollár (United States) Liv Hovde
October 30	Sharm El Sheikh, Egypt; Hard; W15; Singles and doubles draws	Alexandra Shubladze; 6–3, 7–5	Ekaterina Shalimova	(Switzerland) Jenny Dürst (Austria) Tamara Kostic	(Poland) Weronika Ewald (Netherlands) Annelin Bakker (Serbia) Darja Suvirđonkova; Vlada Mincheva
October 30	Sharm El Sheikh, Egypt; Hard; W15; Singles and doubles draws	(Serbia) Darja Suvirđonkova; Daria Zelinskaya; 7–5, 2–6, [13–11]	(Austria) Tamara Kostic; Alexandra Shubladze	(Switzerland) Jenny Dürst (Austria) Tamara Kostic	(Poland) Weronika Ewald (Netherlands) Annelin Bakker (Serbia) Darja Suvirđonkova; Vlada Mincheva
October 30	Näsbypark, Sweden; Hard (i); W15; Singles and doubles draws	(Lithuania) Andrė Lukošiūtė; 6–1, 6–4	(Ukraine) Daria Lopatetska	(Sweden) Caijsa Hennemann (Croatia) Iva Primorac	(Belgium) Jana Otzipka (Germany) Franziska Sziedat (Sweden) Lisa Zaar (Sweden) Lea Nilsson
October 30	Näsbypark, Sweden; Hard (i); W15; Singles and doubles draws	(Sweden) Caijsa Hennemann (Sweden) Lisa Zaar; 5–7, 6–1, [10–6]	(Ukraine) Daria Lopatetska (Ukraine) Daria Yesypchuk	(Sweden) Caijsa Hennemann (Croatia) Iva Primorac	(Belgium) Jana Otzipka (Germany) Franziska Sziedat (Sweden) Lisa Zaar (Sweden) Lea Nilsson
October 30	Norman, United States; Hard (i); W15; Singles and doubles draws	(Argentina) Lucía Peyre; 6–2, 6–2	(United States) Ashton Bowers	Maria Kononova; Anna Zyryanova	(United States) Jessica Failla (United States) Emma Staker (Chinese Taipei) Hsu Chieh-yu (United States) Tatum Evans
October 30	Norman, United States; Hard (i); W15; Singles and doubles draws	(Slovenia) Kristina Novak (Argentina) Lucía Peyre; 6–3, 6–2	(Slovakia) Romana Čisovská (United States) Emma Staker	Maria Kononova; Anna Zyryanova	(United States) Jessica Failla (United States) Emma Staker (Chinese Taipei) Hsu Chieh-yu (United States) Tatum Evans

=== November ===
Week of	Tournament	Winner	Runners-up	Semifinalists	Quarterfinalists
November 6	LTP Charleston Pro Tennis 2 Charleston, United States; Clay; W100; Singles – Doubles	(United States) Emma Navarro; 6–1, 6–1	(Hungary) Panna Udvardy	(United States) Hailey Baptiste (Mexico) Renata Zarazúa	(United States) Sachia Vickery (United States) Elizabeth Mandlik (United States) Varvara Lepchenko (United States) Ann Li
November 6	LTP Charleston Pro Tennis 2 Charleston, United States; Clay; W100; Singles – Doubles	(United States) Hailey Baptiste (United States) Whitney Osuigwe; 6–4, 3–6, [13–11]	(Uzbekistan) Nigina Abduraimova (France) Carole Monnet	(United States) Hailey Baptiste (Mexico) Renata Zarazúa	(United States) Sachia Vickery (United States) Elizabeth Mandlik (United States) Varvara Lepchenko (United States) Ann Li
November 6	Calgary National Bank Challenger; Calgary, Canada; Hard (i); W60+H; Singles – Doubles	(Germany) Sabine Lisicki; 7–6^{(7–2)}, 6–7^{(5–7)}, 6–3	(Canada) Stacey Fung	(United States) Jamie Loeb (Poland) Urszula Radwańska	(United States) Dalayna Hewitt (United States) Liv Hovde (Switzerland) Lulu Sun (Australia) Arina Rodionova
November 6	Calgary National Bank Challenger; Calgary, Canada; Hard (i); W60+H; Singles – Doubles	(United Kingdom) Sarah Beth Grey (United Kingdom) Eden Silva; 6–4, 6–4	(United States) Hanna Chang (Serbia) Katarina Jokić	(United States) Jamie Loeb (Poland) Urszula Radwańska	(United States) Dalayna Hewitt (United States) Liv Hovde (Switzerland) Lulu Sun (Australia) Arina Rodionova
November 6	Heraklion, Greece; Clay; W40; Singles and doubles draws	(Czech Republic) Brenda Fruhvirtová; 6–1, 6–3	Ekaterina Makarova	(Spain) Leyre Romero Gormaz (North Macedonia) Lina Gjorcheska	(Greece) Michaela Laki (Romania) Ilinca Amariei (Romania) Cristina Dinu (Romania) Andreea Mitu
November 6	Heraklion, Greece; Clay; W40; Singles and doubles draws	(Belgium) Lara Salden (Latvia) Daniela Vismane; 6–4, 6–3	(Romania) Oana Gavrilă (Greece) Sapfo Sakellaridi	(Spain) Leyre Romero Gormaz (North Macedonia) Lina Gjorcheska	(Greece) Michaela Laki (Romania) Ilinca Amariei (Romania) Cristina Dinu (Romania) Andreea Mitu
November 6	Solarino, Italy; Carpet; W25; Singles and doubles draws	(Czech Republic) Linda Klimovičová; 6–3, 6–7^{(5–7)}, 6–1	(United Kingdom) Emilie Lindh	(United States) Vivian Wolff (Estonia) Maileen Nuudi	(Italy) Samira De Stefano (Czech Republic) Julie Štruplová (Italy) Giorgia Pedone (Finland) Laura Hietaranta
November 6	Solarino, Italy; Carpet; W25; Singles and doubles draws	(Czech Republic) Linda Klimovičová (Czech Republic) Julie Štruplová; 6–1, 6–7^{(4–7)}, [10–8]	(Italy) Gaia Maduzzi (Italy) Vittoria Paganetti	(United States) Vivian Wolff (Estonia) Maileen Nuudi	(Italy) Samira De Stefano (Czech Republic) Julie Štruplová (Italy) Giorgia Pedone (Finland) Laura Hietaranta
November 6	Santo Domingo, Dominican Republic; Hard; W25; Singles and doubles draws	(Mexico) Ana Sofía Sánchez; 1–6, 7–6^{(7–0)}, 6–2	(Serbia) Dejana Radanović	(United States) Hina Inoue (China) Lu Jiajing	(United States) Raveena Kingsley (France) Emma Léné (Mexico) Victoria Rodríguez (Spain) Carlota Martínez Círez
November 6	Santo Domingo, Dominican Republic; Hard; W25; Singles and doubles draws	(Poland) Anna Hertel / (Poland) Olivia Lincer vs (Japan) Hiroko Kuwata / (Brazil) Rebeca Pereira doubles final was abandoned due to poor weather		(United States) Hina Inoue (China) Lu Jiajing	(United States) Raveena Kingsley (France) Emma Léné (Mexico) Victoria Rodríguez (Spain) Carlota Martínez Círez
November 6	Antalya, Turkey; Clay; W15; Singles and doubles draws	Valeriya Yushchenko; 6–4, 6–2	(Slovakia) Irina Balus	(Germany) Nastasja Schunk (Italy) Giulia Carbonaro	(Romania) Joulia Cristiana Cirstea (Italy) Gaia Squarcialupi (Czech Republic) Lucie Urbanová (Serbia) Andjela Lazarević
November 6	Antalya, Turkey; Clay; W15; Singles and doubles draws	(Netherlands) Rikke de Koning (Netherlands) Madelief Hageman; 7–6^{(7–5)}, 6–2	(Romania) Iulia Andreea Ionescu (Romania) Anastasia Safta	(Germany) Nastasja Schunk (Italy) Giulia Carbonaro	(Romania) Joulia Cristiana Cirstea (Italy) Gaia Squarcialupi (Czech Republic) Lucie Urbanová (Serbia) Andjela Lazarević
November 6	Sharm El Sheikh, Egypt; Hard; W15; Singles and doubles draws	Mariia Tkacheva; 6–1, 6–2	(Switzerland) Jenny Dürst	Ekaterina Shalimova; Evgeniya Burdina	Alisa Kummel (Egypt) Yasmin Ezzat (Poland) Zuzanna Pawlikowska (Netherlands) Annelin Bakker
November 6	Sharm El Sheikh, Egypt; Hard; W15; Singles and doubles draws	Ekaterina Shalimova; Mariia Tkacheva; 6–2, 3–6, [10–6]	(Switzerland) Paula Cembranos (Switzerland) Jenny Dürst	Ekaterina Shalimova; Evgeniya Burdina	Alisa Kummel (Egypt) Yasmin Ezzat (Poland) Zuzanna Pawlikowska (Netherlands) Annelin Bakker
November 6	Monastir, Tunisia; Hard; W15; Singles and doubles draws	(Canada) Carson Branstine; 7–5, 4–6, 6–3	(United Kingdom) Ranah Stoiber	Milana Zhabrailova (Belgium) Eliessa Vanlangendonck	(Netherlands) Marente Sijbesma (South Korea) Shin Ji-ho (Germany) Emily Welker (Romania) Carmen Andreea Herea
November 6	Monastir, Tunisia; Hard; W15; Singles and doubles draws	(Canada) Carson Branstine (Germany) Selina Dal; 3–6, 7–5, [10–8]	(Belgium) Eliessa Vanlangendonck (Germany) Emily Welker	Milana Zhabrailova (Belgium) Eliessa Vanlangendonck	(Netherlands) Marente Sijbesma (South Korea) Shin Ji-ho (Germany) Emily Welker (Romania) Carmen Andreea Herea
November 6	Castellón, Spain; Clay; W15; Singles and doubles draws	(Spain) Ángela Fita Boluda; 6–4, 7–6^{(7–5)}	(Spain) Ariana Geerlings	(Spain) Paula Arias Manjón (Ukraine) Nadiya Kolb	(Germany) Joëlle Steur (Spain) Ruth Roura Llaverias (United States) Kaitlin Quevedo (Spain) Lucía Llinares Domingo
November 6	Castellón, Spain; Clay; W15; Singles and doubles draws	(Switzerland) Marie Mettraux (Germany) Chantal Sauvant; 3–6, 6–1, [10–5]	(Ukraine) Maryna Kolb (Ukraine) Nadiya Kolb	(Spain) Paula Arias Manjón (Ukraine) Nadiya Kolb	(Germany) Joëlle Steur (Spain) Ruth Roura Llaverias (United States) Kaitlin Quevedo (Spain) Lucía Llinares Domingo
November 6	Champaign, United States; Hard (i); W15; Singles and doubles draws	(Australia) Stefani Webb; 6–2, 2–6, 6–1	(Germany) Gina Marie Dittmann	(China) Wang Xintong (United States) Annika Penickova	(United States) Rhiann Newborn (Spain) Raquel González Vilar (United States) Mary Lewis (United States) Kennedy Shaffer
November 6	Champaign, United States; Hard (i); W15; Singles and doubles draws	(France) Sophia Biolay (Australia) Stefani Webb; 7–5, 6–3	(Spain) Raquel González Vilar (Japan) Ayumi Miyamoto	(China) Wang Xintong (United States) Annika Penickova	(United States) Rhiann Newborn (Spain) Raquel González Vilar (United States) Mary Lewis (United States) Kennedy Shaffer
November 13	Takasaki Open; Takasaki, Japan; Hard; W100; Singles – Doubles	(China) Yuan Yue; 5–7, 7–5, 6–0	(United Kingdom) Harriet Dart	(Chinese Taipei) Liang En-shuo (China) Wei Sijia	(Thailand) Mananchaya Sawangkaew (Serbia) Natalija Stevanović (Japan) Kyōka Okamura (Japan) Ena Koike
November 13	Takasaki Open; Takasaki, Japan; Hard; W100; Singles – Doubles	(China) Guo Hanyu (China) Jiang Xinyu; 7–6^{(7–5)}, 5–7, [10–5]	(Japan) Momoko Kobori (Japan) Ayano Shimizu	(Chinese Taipei) Liang En-shuo (China) Wei Sijia	(Thailand) Mananchaya Sawangkaew (Serbia) Natalija Stevanović (Japan) Kyōka Okamura (Japan) Ena Koike
November 13	Funchal, Portugal; Hard; W40; Singles and doubles draws	(Czech Republic) Dominika Šalková; 4–6, 7–5, 6–3	(Croatia) Lea Bošković	(France) Amandine Hesse (China) Gao Xinyu	(Spain) Guiomar Maristany; Anastasia Kovaleva (France) Harmony Tan (United Kingdom) Emilie Lindh
November 13	Funchal, Portugal; Hard; W40; Singles and doubles draws	Anastasia Kovaleva; Elena Pridankina; 6–2, 6–3	(France) Yasmine Mansouri (Portugal) Inês Murta	(France) Amandine Hesse (China) Gao Xinyu	(Spain) Guiomar Maristany; Anastasia Kovaleva (France) Harmony Tan (United Kingdom) Emilie Lindh
November 13	Pétange, Luxembourg; Hard (i); W40; Singles and doubles draws	(France) Océane Dodin; 6–1, 7–5	(Philippines) Alex Eala	(Belgium) Hanne Vandewinkel (Germany) Anna-Lena Friedsam	(Denmark) Clara Tauson (Belgium) Sofia Costoulas (Belgium) Amelie Van Impe (Netherlands) Jasmijn Gimbrère
November 13	Pétange, Luxembourg; Hard (i); W40; Singles and doubles draws	(United Kingdom) Alicia Barnett (United Kingdom) Samantha Murray Sharan; 6–7^{(4–7)}, 6–1, [10–6]	(United Kingdom) Ali Collins (Netherlands) Isabelle Haverlag	(Belgium) Hanne Vandewinkel (Germany) Anna-Lena Friedsam	(Denmark) Clara Tauson (Belgium) Sofia Costoulas (Belgium) Amelie Van Impe (Netherlands) Jasmijn Gimbrère
November 13	Heraklion, Greece; Clay; W25; Singles and doubles draws	(Spain) Ane Mintegi del Olmo; 6–2, 6–3	(Romania) Cristina Dinu	(Greece) Dimitra Pavlou (Romania) Alexandra Cadanțu-Ignatik	(Ukraine) Oleksandra Oliynykova (Romania) Ilinca Amariei (Spain) Leyre Romero Gormaz (Romania) Oana Gavrilă
November 13	Heraklion, Greece; Clay; W25; Singles and doubles draws	(Italy) Martina Colmegna (Mexico) María Portillo Ramírez; 6–2, 6–4	(Latvia) Margarita Ignatjeva (Greece) Elena Korokozidi	(Greece) Dimitra Pavlou (Romania) Alexandra Cadanțu-Ignatik	(Ukraine) Oleksandra Oliynykova (Romania) Ilinca Amariei (Spain) Leyre Romero Gormaz (Romania) Oana Gavrilă
November 13	Solarino, Italy; Carpet; W25; Singles and doubles draws	(Czech Republic) Linda Klimovičová; 6–2, 6–3	(Italy) Lisa Pigato	(Bulgaria) Isabella Shinikova (Italy) Giorgia Pedone	(Italy) Samira De Stefano (Italy) Beatrice Ricci (Italy) Eleonora Alvisi (Estonia) Maileen Nuudi
November 13	Solarino, Italy; Carpet; W25; Singles and doubles draws	(Italy) Angelica Moratelli (Italy) Lisa Pigato; 6–3, 6–4	(Georgia (country)) Sofia Shapatava (United Kingdom) Emily Webley-Smith	(Bulgaria) Isabella Shinikova (Italy) Giorgia Pedone	(Italy) Samira De Stefano (Italy) Beatrice Ricci (Italy) Eleonora Alvisi (Estonia) Maileen Nuudi
November 13	Santo Domingo, Dominican Republic; Hard; W25; Singles and doubles draws	(United States) Maria Mateas; 7–5, 7–6^{(7–2)}	(Mexico) Ana Sofía Sánchez	(Mexico) Victoria Rodríguez (China) Lu Jiajing	(United States) Carolyn Ansari (Canada) Cadence Brace (Sweden) Jacqueline Cabaj Awad (United States) Haley Giavara
November 13	Santo Domingo, Dominican Republic; Hard; W25; Singles and doubles draws	(Serbia) Katarina Jokić (United States) Taylor Ng; Walkover	(Sweden) Jacqueline Cabaj Awad (Mexico) María Fernanda Navarro Oliva	(Mexico) Victoria Rodríguez (China) Lu Jiajing	(United States) Carolyn Ansari (Canada) Cadence Brace (Sweden) Jacqueline Cabaj Awad (United States) Haley Giavara
November 13	Austin, United States; Hard; W25; Singles and doubles draws	(Andorra) Victoria Jiménez Kasintseva; 6–0, 6–2	(United States) Hanna Chang	(United States) Madison Sieg (United States) Chloe Beck	(United States) Catherine Harrison (United States) Ellie Douglas (Slovakia) Martina Okáľová (United States) Ashley Lahey
November 13	Austin, United States; Hard; W25; Singles and doubles draws	(China) Han Jiangxue (China) Huang Yujia; 7–5, 2–6, [10–8]	Maria Kozyreva (United States) Ashley Lahey	(United States) Madison Sieg (United States) Chloe Beck	(United States) Catherine Harrison (United States) Ellie Douglas (Slovakia) Martina Okáľová (United States) Ashley Lahey
November 13	Antalya, Turkey; Clay; W15; Singles and doubles draws	Valeriya Yushchenko; 6–1, 6–3	(Kyrgyzstan) Vladislava Andreevskaya	(Slovakia) Irina Balus (Italy) Marion Viertler	(Slovakia) Anika Jašková (Germany) Nastasja Schunk (Romania) Anastasia Safta (Serbia) Natalija Senić
November 13	Antalya, Turkey; Clay; W15; Singles and doubles draws	(Slovakia) Irina Balus (Slovakia) Anika Jašková; 3–6, 6–2, [10–8]	Aleksandra Pospelova; Lidiia Rasskovskaia	(Slovakia) Irina Balus (Italy) Marion Viertler	(Slovakia) Anika Jašková (Germany) Nastasja Schunk (Romania) Anastasia Safta (Serbia) Natalija Senić
November 13	Sharm El Sheikh, Egypt; Hard; W15; Singles and doubles draws	Alisa Kummel; 7–5, 7–6^{(7–3)}	(Poland) Zuzanna Pawlikowska	Margarita Skryabina (Chinese Taipei) Fang An-lin	(South Korea) Kim Yu-jin (Slovakia) Mia Chudejová; Mariia Tkacheva; Evgeniya Burdina
November 13	Sharm El Sheikh, Egypt; Hard; W15; Singles and doubles draws	Alisa Kummel; Ekaterina Makarova; 6–4, 6–0	(Egypt) Yasmin Ezzat (Poland) Zuzanna Pawlikowska	Margarita Skryabina (Chinese Taipei) Fang An-lin	(South Korea) Kim Yu-jin (Slovakia) Mia Chudejová; Mariia Tkacheva; Evgeniya Burdina
November 13	Monastir, Tunisia; Hard; W15; Singles and doubles draws	(Canada) Carson Branstine; 6–2, 6–3	(Germany) Emily Welker	(Belgium) Vicky Van de Peer (Germany) Selina Dal	(Sweden) Julita Saner (Japan) Yuno Kitahara (Germany) Marie Vogt (China) Yuan Chengyiyi
November 13	Monastir, Tunisia; Hard; W15; Singles and doubles draws	(Brazil) Ana Candiotto (Czech Republic) Amélie Šmejkalová; 7–5, 6–3	(Sweden) Julita Saner (Germany) Marie Vogt	(Belgium) Vicky Van de Peer (Germany) Selina Dal	(Sweden) Julita Saner (Japan) Yuno Kitahara (Germany) Marie Vogt (China) Yuan Chengyiyi
November 13	Nules, Spain; Clay; W15; Singles and doubles draws	(Spain) Ángela Fita Boluda; 6–4, 6–3	(Germany) Mina Hodzic	(Spain) Judith Perelló Saavedra (United Kingdom) Sarah Tatu	(Chile) Jimar Gerald González (Italy) Nicole Fossa Huergo (Ukraine) Nadiya Kolb (Spain) Ruth Roura Llaverias
November 13	Nules, Spain; Clay; W15; Singles and doubles draws	(Spain) Yvonne Cavallé Reimers (Spain) Ángela Fita Boluda; 6–1, 6–2	(Ukraine) Maryna Kolb (Ukraine) Nadiya Kolb	(Spain) Judith Perelló Saavedra (United Kingdom) Sarah Tatu	(Chile) Jimar Gerald González (Italy) Nicole Fossa Huergo (Ukraine) Nadiya Kolb (Spain) Ruth Roura Llaverias
November 13	Buenos Aires, Argentina; Clay; W15; Singles and doubles draws	(Brazil) Thaísa Grana Pedretti; 7–5, 6–2	(United States) Alexia Harmon	(Liechtenstein) Sylvie Zünd (Ecuador) Camila Romero	(Argentina) Nicole Poj (Argentina) Justina González Daniele (Argentina) Carla Markus (Argentina) Luisina Giovannini
November 13	Buenos Aires, Argentina; Clay; W15; Singles and doubles draws	(Brazil) Thaísa Grana Pedretti (Ecuador) Camila Romero; 0–6, 7–5, [10–5]	(Argentina) Justina González Daniele (Liechtenstein) Sylvie Zünd	(Liechtenstein) Sylvie Zünd (Ecuador) Camila Romero	(Argentina) Nicole Poj (Argentina) Justina González Daniele (Argentina) Carla Markus (Argentina) Luisina Giovannini
November 20	Takasaki Open 2 Takasaki, Japan; Hard; W100; Singles – Doubles	(China) Bai Zhuoxuan; 6–2, 6–3	(China) Yuan Yue	(United Kingdom) Lily Miyazaki (Japan) Mai Hontama	Anastasia Tikhonova (South Korea) Jang Su-jeong (Japan) Ena Koike (Netherlands) Suzan Lamens
November 20	Takasaki Open 2 Takasaki, Japan; Hard; W100; Singles – Doubles	(Thailand) Luksika Kumkhum (Thailand) Peangtarn Plipuech; 6–3, 6–1	(Chinese Taipei) Liang En-shuo (Chinese Taipei) Wu Fang-hsien	(United Kingdom) Lily Miyazaki (Japan) Mai Hontama	Anastasia Tikhonova (South Korea) Jang Su-jeong (Japan) Ena Koike (Netherlands) Suzan Lamens
November 20	Open Ciudad de Valencia; Valencia, Spain; Clay; W100; Singles – Doubles	(Bulgaria) Viktoriya Tomova; 7–5, 6–3	(Romania) Jaqueline Cristian	(Poland) Katarzyna Kawa (Romania) Andreea Mitu	(Serbia) Mia Ristić (Slovakia) Rebecca Šramková (Spain) Irene Burillo Escorihuela (Spain) Aliona Bolsova
November 20	Open Ciudad de Valencia; Valencia, Spain; Clay; W100; Singles – Doubles	(Greece) Valentini Grammatikopoulou (Romania) Andreea Mitu; 7–5, 6–4	(Spain) Aliona Bolsova (Georgia (country)) Natela Dzalamidze	(Poland) Katarzyna Kawa (Romania) Andreea Mitu	(Serbia) Mia Ristić (Slovakia) Rebecca Šramková (Spain) Irene Burillo Escorihuela (Spain) Aliona Bolsova
November 20	Brisbane QTC Tennis International; Brisbane, Australia; Hard; W60; Singles – Doubles	(Australia) Taylah Preston; 6–3, 6–4	Darya Astakhova	(Chinese Taipei) Joanna Garland (Australia) Kaylah McPhee	(Australia) Priscilla Hon (Japan) Sakura Hosogi (Australia) Seone Mendez (Australia) Destanee Aiava
November 20	Brisbane QTC Tennis International; Brisbane, Australia; Hard; W60; Singles – Doubles	(Australia) Talia Gibson (Australia) Priscilla Hon; 4–6, 7–5, [10–5]	(Australia) Destanee Aiava (Australia) Maddison Inglis	(Chinese Taipei) Joanna Garland (Australia) Kaylah McPhee	(Australia) Priscilla Hon (Japan) Sakura Hosogi (Australia) Seone Mendez (Australia) Destanee Aiava
November 20	Guadalajara, Mexico; Clay; W40; Singles and doubles draws	(Czech Republic) Brenda Fruhvirtová; 6–1, 6–3	(Ukraine) Valeriya Strakhova	Veronika Miroshnichenko (Spain) Carlota Martínez Círez	(Romania) Gabriela Lee (Argentina) Julieta Lara Estable (Mexico) Fernanda Contreras (Sweden) Fanny Östlund
November 20	Guadalajara, Mexico; Clay; W40; Singles and doubles draws	(United States) Haley Giavara (Canada) Layne Sleeth; 6–4, 6–3	Veronika Miroshnichenko (Sweden) Fanny Östlund	Veronika Miroshnichenko (Spain) Carlota Martínez Círez	(Romania) Gabriela Lee (Argentina) Julieta Lara Estable (Mexico) Fernanda Contreras (Sweden) Fanny Östlund
November 20	Bangalore, India; Clay; W25; Singles and doubles draws	(India) Shrivalli Bhamidipaty; 6–0, 4–6, 6–3	(India) Zeel Desai	(India) Rutuja Bhosale (Thailand) Lanlana Tararudee	(Germany) Antonia Schmidt (Kazakhstan) Zhibek Kulambayeva (India) Vaishnavi Adkar (Italy) Diletta Cherubini
November 20	Bangalore, India; Clay; W25; Singles and doubles draws	(Italy) Diletta Cherubini (Germany) Antonia Schmidt; 4–6, 7–5, [10–4]	(Thailand) Punnin Kovapitukted; Anna Ureke	(India) Rutuja Bhosale (Thailand) Lanlana Tararudee	(Germany) Antonia Schmidt (Kazakhstan) Zhibek Kulambayeva (India) Vaishnavi Adkar (Italy) Diletta Cherubini
November 20	Limassol, Cyprus; Hard; W25; Singles and doubles draws	(Belgium) Hanne Vandewinkel; 6–2, 4–6, 6–4	(Belgium) Sofia Costoulas	(Greece) Sapfo Sakellaridi; Anastasia Zakharova	(Germany) Katharina Hobgarski (United Kingdom) Eliz Maloney (Denmark) Rebecca Munk Mortensen (Spain) Guiomar Maristany
November 20	Limassol, Cyprus; Hard; W25; Singles and doubles draws	(Czech Republic) Julie Štruplová (Belgium) Hanne Vandewinkel; 6–4, 6–4	(Germany) Katharina Hobgarski (Spain) Guiomar Maristany	(Greece) Sapfo Sakellaridi; Anastasia Zakharova	(Germany) Katharina Hobgarski (United Kingdom) Eliz Maloney (Denmark) Rebecca Munk Mortensen (Spain) Guiomar Maristany
November 20	Internazionali Tennis Val Gardena Südtirol; Ortisei, Italy; Hard (i); W25; Singles and doubles draws	(Germany) Mona Barthel; 6–2, 6–7^{(6–8)}, 6–4	(Latvia) Diāna Marcinkēviča	(Finland) Anastasia Kulikova; Yuliya Hatouka	(Germany) Carolina Kuhl (France) Loïs Boisson (Sweden) Caijsa Hennemann (United Kingdom) Amarni Banks
November 20	Internazionali Tennis Val Gardena Südtirol; Ortisei, Italy; Hard (i); W25; Singles and doubles draws	(Italy) Anastasia Abbagnato (Latvia) Kamilla Bartone; 6–4, 6–2	(Netherlands) Indy de Vroome (Serbia) Katarina Kozarov	(Finland) Anastasia Kulikova; Yuliya Hatouka	(Germany) Carolina Kuhl (France) Loïs Boisson (Sweden) Caijsa Hennemann (United Kingdom) Amarni Banks
November 20	Lousada, Portugal; Hard (i); W25; Singles and doubles draws	(Australia) Arina Rodionova; 1–6, 6–3, 6–4	(United States) Robin Anderson	Elena Pridankina (Croatia) Lea Bošković	(Portugal) Francisca Jorge (Andorra) Victoria Jiménez Kasintseva (Croatia) Antonia Ružić (France) Amandine Monnot
November 20	Lousada, Portugal; Hard (i); W25; Singles and doubles draws	(Germany) Mara Guth; Elena Pridankina; 6–1, 6–1	(Germany) Alicia Melosch (Germany) Johanna Silva	Elena Pridankina (Croatia) Lea Bošković	(Portugal) Francisca Jorge (Andorra) Victoria Jiménez Kasintseva (Croatia) Antonia Ružić (France) Amandine Monnot
November 20	Antalya, Turkey; Clay; W15; Singles and doubles draws	(Sweden) Lisa Zaar; 6–2, 6–1	(Serbia) Natalija Senić	(Italy) Vittoria Modesti; Valeriya Yushchenko	Eva Garkusha (Georgia (country)) Zoziya Kardava (Kyrgyzstan) Vladislava Andreevskaya (Kazakhstan) Tatyana Nikolenko
November 20	Antalya, Turkey; Clay; W15; Singles and doubles draws	Aleksandra Pospelova; Lidiia Rasskovskaia; 6–7^{(3–7)}, 6–4, [10–1]	(Romania) Iulia Andreea Ionescu (Romania) Anastasia Safta	(Italy) Vittoria Modesti; Valeriya Yushchenko	Eva Garkusha (Georgia (country)) Zoziya Kardava (Kyrgyzstan) Vladislava Andreevskaya (Kazakhstan) Tatyana Nikolenko
November 20	Heraklion, Greece; Clay; W15; Singles and doubles draws	(Greece) Michaela Laki; 6–2, 2–6, 7–6^{(7–5)}	(Romania) Lavinia Tânâsie	(Lithuania) Klaudija Bubelytė (Greece) Eleni Christofi	(Lithuania) Patricija Paukštytė (Slovakia) Laura Svatíková (Italy) Ginevra Parentini (Italy) Maria Vittoria Viviani
November 20	Heraklion, Greece; Clay; W15; Singles and doubles draws	(Greece) Eleni Christofi (Lithuania) Patricija Paukštytė; 6–3, 6–1	(Slovakia) Karolína Krajmer (Estonia) Andrea Roots	(Lithuania) Klaudija Bubelytė (Greece) Eleni Christofi	(Lithuania) Patricija Paukštytė (Slovakia) Laura Svatíková (Italy) Ginevra Parentini (Italy) Maria Vittoria Viviani
November 20	Sharm El Sheikh, Egypt; Hard; W15; Singles and doubles draws	(Romania) Briana Szabó; Walkover	(Ukraine) Kateryna Lazarenko	(India) Teja Tirunelveli; Alisa Kummel	Evgeniya Burdina; Mariia Tkacheva (Netherlands) Anouck Vrancken Peeters (Egypt) Yasmin Ezzat
November 20	Sharm El Sheikh, Egypt; Hard; W15; Singles and doubles draws	Evgeniya Burdina; Nina Rudiukova; 5–7, 6–4, [10–6]	(Egypt) Mariam Atia (Austria) Lilli Tagger	(India) Teja Tirunelveli; Alisa Kummel	Evgeniya Burdina; Mariia Tkacheva (Netherlands) Anouck Vrancken Peeters (Egypt) Yasmin Ezzat
November 20	Monastir, Tunisia; Hard; W15; Singles and doubles draws	Milana Zhabrailova; 6–2, 6–2	(Romania) Mara Gae	(Switzerland) Karolina Kozakova (Germany) Anja Wildgruber	(China) Yuan Chengyiyi (Switzerland) Nicole Gadient (France) Ksenia Efremova (Netherlands) Dilara Okur
November 20	Monastir, Tunisia; Hard; W15; Singles and doubles draws	(Romania) Mara Gae (Netherlands) Rose Marie Nijkamp; 3–6, 6–3, [11–9]	(China) Yang Yidi (China) Yuan Chengyiyi	(Switzerland) Karolina Kozakova (Germany) Anja Wildgruber	(China) Yuan Chengyiyi (Switzerland) Nicole Gadient (France) Ksenia Efremova (Netherlands) Dilara Okur
November 20	Alcalá de Henares, Spain; Hard; W15; Singles and doubles draws	(Netherlands) Lian Tran; 7–5, 6–0	(Spain) Cristina Díaz Adrover	(Italy) Chiara Girelli (Switzerland) Tess Sugnaux	Ekaterina Kazionova (Israel) Vlada Ekshibarova (United Kingdom) Matilda Mutavdzic (Luxembourg) Marie Weckerle
November 20	Alcalá de Henares, Spain; Hard; W15; Singles and doubles draws	(Belgium) Tilwith Di Girolami (Netherlands) Lian Tran; 6–4, 6–2	(Italy) Ester Ivaldo (Norway) Carina Syrtveit	(Italy) Chiara Girelli (Switzerland) Tess Sugnaux	Ekaterina Kazionova (Israel) Vlada Ekshibarova (United Kingdom) Matilda Mutavdzic (Luxembourg) Marie Weckerle
November 20	Córdoba, Argentina; Clay; W15; Singles and doubles draws	(Argentina) Luisina Giovannini; 6–1, 6–1	(Brazil) Thaísa Grana Pedretti	(Argentina) Francesca Mattioli (Liechtenstein) Sylvie Zünd	(Argentina) María Victoria Marchesini (Argentina) Justina González Daniele (Argentina) Sol Rabin (Ecuador) Camila Romero
November 20	Córdoba, Argentina; Clay; W15; Singles and doubles draws	(Mexico) Marian Gómez Pezuela Cano (Argentina) Justina González Daniele; 6–3, 4–6, [10–5]	(Argentina) Francesca Mattioli (Argentina) Mariana Zottoli	(Argentina) Francesca Mattioli (Liechtenstein) Sylvie Zünd	(Argentina) María Victoria Marchesini (Argentina) Justina González Daniele (Argentina) Sol Rabin (Ecuador) Camila Romero
November 27	Gold Coast Tennis International; Gold Coast, Australia; Hard; W60; Singles – Doubles	(Australia) Talia Gibson; 7–5, 6–2	(Australia) Olivia Gadecki	(Japan) Eri Shimizu (Japan) Miho Kuramochi	(Australia) Petra Hule (Australia) Maddison Inglis (Australia) Melisa Ercan (Australia) Ivana Popovic
November 27	Gold Coast Tennis International; Gold Coast, Australia; Hard; W60; Singles – Doubles	(Australia) Roisin Gilheany (Australia) Maya Joint; 7–6^{(7–3)}, 6–1	(Australia) Melisa Ercan (Australia) Alicia Smith	(Japan) Eri Shimizu (Japan) Miho Kuramochi	(Australia) Petra Hule (Australia) Maddison Inglis (Australia) Melisa Ercan (Australia) Ivana Popovic
November 27	Empire Women's Indoor 3 Trnava, Slovakia; Hard (i); W60; Singles – Doubles	(Australia) Arina Rodionova; 7–6^{(7–1)}, 5–7, 6–1	(France) Kristina Mladenovic	(Germany) Mona Barthel; Yuliya Hatouka	(Ukraine) Kateryna Volodko (Malta) Francesca Curmi (Serbia) Elena Milovanović (Uzbekistan) Nigina Abduraimova
November 27	Empire Women's Indoor 3 Trnava, Slovakia; Hard (i); W60; Singles – Doubles	(Slovakia) Natália Kročková (Slovakia) Tereza Mihalíková; 7–6^{(9–7)}, 7–5	(France) Estelle Cascino (Czech Republic) Jesika Malečková	(Germany) Mona Barthel; Yuliya Hatouka	(Ukraine) Kateryna Volodko (Malta) Francesca Curmi (Serbia) Elena Milovanović (Uzbekistan) Nigina Abduraimova
November 27	Keio Challenger; Yokohama, Japan; Hard; W40; Singles and doubles draws	Aliona Falei; 6–3, 7–5	(Japan) Ayano Shimizu	(China) Wei Sijia (Japan) Mai Hontama	(Netherlands) Suzan Lamens (United Kingdom) Lily Miyazaki (Thailand) Mananchaya Sawangkaew (Japan) Aoi Ito
November 27	Keio Challenger; Yokohama, Japan; Hard; W40; Singles and doubles draws	(Chinese Taipei) Liang En-shuo (China) Tang Qianhui; Walkover	(Japan) Aoi Ito (Japan) Natsumi Kawaguchi	(China) Wei Sijia (Japan) Mai Hontama	(Netherlands) Suzan Lamens (United Kingdom) Lily Miyazaki (Thailand) Mananchaya Sawangkaew (Japan) Aoi Ito
November 27	Veracruz, Mexico; Hard; W40; Singles and doubles draws	(United States) Hanna Chang; 7–5, 6–1	(Mexico) Victoria Rodríguez	(China) Lu Jiajing (Portugal) Francisca Jorge	(Spain) Carlota Martínez Círez (Serbia) Katarina Jokić; Veronika Miroshnichenko (United States) Victoria Hu
November 27	Veracruz, Mexico; Hard; W40; Singles and doubles draws	(United States) Dalayna Hewitt; Veronika Miroshnichenko; 2–6, 6–3, [10–8]	(United States) Victoria Hu (Argentina) Melany Solange Krywoj	(China) Lu Jiajing (Portugal) Francisca Jorge	(Spain) Carlota Martínez Círez (Serbia) Katarina Jokić; Veronika Miroshnichenko (United States) Victoria Hu
November 27	Limassol, Cyprus; Hard; W25; Singles and doubles draws	(Belgium) Sofia Costoulas; 6–1, 6–3	(Italy) Silvia Ambrosio	(Spain) Guiomar Maristany; Anastasia Zakharova	(Germany) Katharina Hobgarski (Austria) Tamara Kostic; Polina Iatcenko (United Kingdom) Ranah Stoiber
November 27	Limassol, Cyprus; Hard; W25; Singles and doubles draws	Anastasiia Gureva; Polina Iatcenko; Walkover	(United Kingdom) Katy Dunne (Switzerland) Leonie Küng	(Spain) Guiomar Maristany; Anastasia Zakharova	(Germany) Katharina Hobgarski (Austria) Tamara Kostic; Polina Iatcenko (United Kingdom) Ranah Stoiber
November 27	Selva Gardena, Italy; Hard (i); W25; Singles and doubles draws	(Czech Republic) Julie Štruplová; 6–2, 6–2	(Poland) Martyna Kubka	(Latvia) Kamilla Bartone (Liechtenstein) Kathinka von Deichmann	(Italy) Anastasia Abbagnato (Italy) Arianna Zucchini (United Kingdom) Amarni Banks (Germany) Carolina Kuhl
November 27	Selva Gardena, Italy; Hard (i); W25; Singles and doubles draws	(Netherlands) Jasmijn Gimbrère (Poland) Martyna Kubka; 6–1, 6–4	(Serbia) Bojana Marinković (Luxembourg) Marie Weckerle	(Latvia) Kamilla Bartone (Liechtenstein) Kathinka von Deichmann	(Italy) Anastasia Abbagnato (Italy) Arianna Zucchini (United Kingdom) Amarni Banks (Germany) Carolina Kuhl
November 27	Lousada, Portugal; Hard (i); W25; Singles and doubles draws	(France) Margaux Rouvroy; 6–2, 6–3	(Croatia) Lucija Ćirić Bagarić	(United States) Robin Anderson (France) Amandine Monnot	(Israel) Vlada Ekshibarova (France) Jenny Lim (Hungary) Fanny Stollár (Hungary) Natália Szabanin
November 27	Lousada, Portugal; Hard (i); W25; Singles and doubles draws	(Belgium) Eliessa Vanlangendonck (Netherlands) Stéphanie Judith Visscher; Walkover	(Canada) Kayla Cross; Elena Pridankina	(United States) Robin Anderson (France) Amandine Monnot	(Israel) Vlada Ekshibarova (France) Jenny Lim (Hungary) Fanny Stollár (Hungary) Natália Szabanin
November 27	Ahmedabad, India; Hard; W15; Singles and doubles draws	(Germany) Antonia Schmidt; 6–1, 6–2	Anastasia Sukhotina	(India) Shrivalli Bhamidipaty (India) Tanisha Kashyap	(India) Vaidehi Chaudhari (India) Humera Baharmus; Ekaterina Yashina (Italy) Diletta Cherubini
November 27	Ahmedabad, India; Hard; W15; Singles and doubles draws	(India) Shrivalli Bhamidipaty (India) Vaidehi Chaudhari; 6–1, 6–2	(India) Akanksha Dileep Nitture (India) Soha Sadiq	(India) Shrivalli Bhamidipaty (India) Tanisha Kashyap	(India) Vaidehi Chaudhari (India) Humera Baharmus; Ekaterina Yashina (Italy) Diletta Cherubini
November 27	Antalya, Turkey; Clay; W15; Singles and doubles draws	(Serbia) Natalija Senić; 5–1 ret.	(Morocco) Aya El Aouni	(Latvia) Valērija Maija Kargina (Romania) Maria Sara Popa	(Japan) Mayuka Aikawa (South Korea) Lee Eun-hye (Italy) Francesca Pace (South Korea) Ahn Yu-jin
November 27	Antalya, Turkey; Clay; W15; Singles and doubles draws	(Morocco) Aya El Aouni (Italy) Francesca Pace; 6–0, 6–4	(Japan) Mayuka Aikawa (Japan) Haine Ogata	(Latvia) Valērija Maija Kargina (Romania) Maria Sara Popa	(Japan) Mayuka Aikawa (South Korea) Lee Eun-hye (Italy) Francesca Pace (South Korea) Ahn Yu-jin
November 27	Heraklion, Greece; Clay; W15; Singles and doubles draws	(Lithuania) Klaudija Bubelytė; 6–3, 6–1	(Romania) Carmen Andreea Herea	(Greece) Eleni Christofi (Italy) Ginevra Parentini	(Italy) Maria Vittoria Viviani (Germany) Caroline Brack (Estonia) Liisa Varul (Switzerland) Lara Michel
November 27	Heraklion, Greece; Clay; W15; Singles and doubles draws	(Slovakia) Stella Kovačičová (Guatemala) Janika Kusy; 7–6^{(7–5)}, 6–7^{(7–9)}, [10–8]	(Lithuania) Patricija Paukštytė (Estonia) Liisa Varul	(Greece) Eleni Christofi (Italy) Ginevra Parentini	(Italy) Maria Vittoria Viviani (Germany) Caroline Brack (Estonia) Liisa Varul (Switzerland) Lara Michel
November 27	Sharm El Sheikh, Egypt; Hard; W15; Singles and doubles draws	(Poland) Weronika Ewald; 7–5, 6–7^{(5–7)}, 6–1	Maria Golovina	Mariia Tkacheva (Egypt) Yasmin Ezzat	Evgeniya Burdina (Poland) Olivia Bergler (Germany) Maya Drozd; Yuliya Perapekhina
November 27	Sharm El Sheikh, Egypt; Hard; W15; Singles and doubles draws	(South Korea) Kim Yu-jin (Chinese Taipei) Lin Fang-an; 6–4, 7–6^{(7–5)}	Alisa Kummel; Ekaterina Makarova	Mariia Tkacheva (Egypt) Yasmin Ezzat	Evgeniya Burdina (Poland) Olivia Bergler (Germany) Maya Drozd; Yuliya Perapekhina
November 27	Monastir, Tunisia; Hard; W15; Singles and doubles draws	Milana Zhabrailova; 6–2, 2–6, 6–3	(Netherlands) Sarah van Emst	(Romania) Andreea Prisăcariu (Romania) Ioana Zvonaru	(Italy) Martina Spigarelli (Belgium) Vicky Van de Peer (Brazil) Ana Candiotto (United States) Julia Adams
November 27	Monastir, Tunisia; Hard; W15; Singles and doubles draws	(Brazil) Ana Candiotto (Romania) Andreea Prisăcariu; 6–1, 6–0	(France) Aminata Sall (France) Marie Villet	(Romania) Andreea Prisăcariu (Romania) Ioana Zvonaru	(Italy) Martina Spigarelli (Belgium) Vicky Van de Peer (Brazil) Ana Candiotto (United States) Julia Adams
November 27	Valencia, Spain; Clay; W15; Singles and doubles draws	(Germany) Chantal Sauvant; 6–4, 6–7^{(10–12)}, 6–3	(France) Tiantsoa Sarah Rakotomanga Rajaonah	(Poland) Gina Feistel (Romania) Maria Toma	(Serbia) Mihaela Djaković (Germany) Mina Hodzic (Poland) Marcelina Podlińska (Spain) Judith Perelló Saavedra
November 27	Valencia, Spain; Clay; W15; Singles and doubles draws	(Spain) Martina Genis Salas (France) Tiantsoa Sarah Rakotomanga Rajaonah; 2–6, 6–2, [10–8]	(Italy) Enola Chiesa (Italy) Alessandra Mazzola	(Poland) Gina Feistel (Romania) Maria Toma	(Serbia) Mihaela Djaković (Germany) Mina Hodzic (Poland) Marcelina Podlińska (Spain) Judith Perelló Saavedra

=== December ===
Week of	Tournament	Winner	Runners-up	Semifinalists	Quarterfinalists
December 4	Al Habtoor Tennis Challenge; Dubai, United Arab Emirates; Hard; W100; Singles – Doubles	Anastasia Tikhonova; 6–1, 6–4	(Netherlands) Arianne Hartono	(Uzbekistan) Nigina Abduraimova (United Kingdom) Heather Watson	(Bulgaria) Isabella Shinikova; Yuliya Hatouka (Slovakia) Rebecca Šramková; Ksenia Zaytseva
December 4	Al Habtoor Tennis Challenge; Dubai, United Arab Emirates; Hard; W100; Singles – Doubles	(Hungary) Tímea Babos; Vera Zvonareva; 6–1, 2–6, [10–7]	(United Kingdom) Olivia Nicholls (United Kingdom) Heather Watson	(Uzbekistan) Nigina Abduraimova (United Kingdom) Heather Watson	(Bulgaria) Isabella Shinikova; Yuliya Hatouka (Slovakia) Rebecca Šramková; Ksenia Zaytseva
December 4	Monastir, Tunisia; Hard; W25; Singles and doubles draws	(Croatia) Antonia Ružić; 3–6, 6–4, 7–5	(Turkey) Ayla Aksu	Polina Iatcenko (France) Diana Martynov	(Andorra) Victoria Jiménez Kasintseva; Anastasiia Gureva (Greece) Sapfo Sakellaridi (Romania) Andreea Prisăcariu
December 4	Monastir, Tunisia; Hard; W25; Singles and doubles draws	(Belgium) Magali Kempen (Belgium) Lara Salden; 6–7^{(5–7)}, 6–4, [10–4]	(Germany) Katharina Hobgarski (Greece) Sapfo Sakellaridi	Polina Iatcenko (France) Diana Martynov	(Andorra) Victoria Jiménez Kasintseva; Anastasiia Gureva (Greece) Sapfo Sakellaridi (Romania) Andreea Prisăcariu
December 4	Mogi das Cruzes, Brazil; Clay; W25; Singles and doubles draws	(Portugal) Francisca Jorge; 6–1, 6–1	(Lithuania) Justina Mikulskytė	(United States) Maria Mateas (Mexico) Ana Sofía Sánchez	(Canada) Cadence Brace (Brazil) Thaísa Grana Pedretti (France) Séléna Janicijevic (Brazil) Ana Candiotto
December 4	Mogi das Cruzes, Brazil; Clay; W25; Singles and doubles draws	(Brazil) Ana Candiotto (Argentina) Melany Solange Krywoj; 6–2, 1–6, [10–6]	(Italy) Nicole Fossa Huergo (Lithuania) Justina Mikulskytė	(United States) Maria Mateas (Mexico) Ana Sofía Sánchez	(Canada) Cadence Brace (Brazil) Thaísa Grana Pedretti (France) Séléna Janicijevic (Brazil) Ana Candiotto
December 4	Antalya, Turkey; Clay; W15; Singles and doubles draws	(Hungary) Amarissa Kiara Tóth; 6–1, 6–2	(Serbia) Jana Bojović	(Germany) Nicole Rivkin (Turkey) Başak Eraydın	(United Kingdom) Katherine Barnes (Japan) Mayuka Aikawa (Kazakhstan) Asylzhan Arystanbekova; Ksenia Laskutova
December 4	Antalya, Turkey; Clay; W15; Singles and doubles draws	(Germany) Nicole Rivkin (Switzerland) Katerina Tsygourova; 6–3, 7–5	(Japan) Mayuka Aikawa (Switzerland) Marie Mettraux	(Germany) Nicole Rivkin (Turkey) Başak Eraydın	(United Kingdom) Katherine Barnes (Japan) Mayuka Aikawa (Kazakhstan) Asylzhan Arystanbekova; Ksenia Laskutova
December 4	Sharm El Sheikh, Egypt; Hard; W15; Singles and doubles draws	Kira Pavlova; 6–1, 7–6^{(7–3)}	Mariia Tkacheva	Evgeniya Burdina (Egypt) Sandra Samir	(Denmark) Rebecca Munk Mortensen (Romania) Karola Patricia Bejenaru; Alisa Kummel (Egypt) Yasmin Ezzat
December 4	Sharm El Sheikh, Egypt; Hard; W15; Singles and doubles draws	(Romania) Karola Patricia Bejenaru (Slovakia) Katarína Kužmová; 6–3, 7–6^{(7–5)}	Mariia Tkacheva; Daria Zelinskaya	Evgeniya Burdina (Egypt) Sandra Samir	(Denmark) Rebecca Munk Mortensen (Romania) Karola Patricia Bejenaru; Alisa Kummel (Egypt) Yasmin Ezzat
December 4	Valencia, Spain; Clay; W15; Singles and doubles draws	(Spain) Ruth Roura Llaverias; 7–5, 6–2	(France) Tiantsoa Sarah Rakotomanga Rajaonah	(Spain) Cayetana Gay (Italy) Jessica Bertoldo	Ekaterina Reyngold (Germany) Chantal Sauvant (Romania) Oana Georgeta Simion (United Kingdom) Sarah Tatu
December 4	Valencia, Spain; Clay; W15; Singles and doubles draws	(Portugal) Inês Murta (Romania) Oana Georgeta Simion; 7–6^{(7–0)}, 6–2	(Germany) Laura Böhner (Bulgaria) Ani Vangelova	(Spain) Cayetana Gay (Italy) Jessica Bertoldo	Ekaterina Reyngold (Germany) Chantal Sauvant (Romania) Oana Georgeta Simion (United Kingdom) Sarah Tatu
December 11	Vacaria Open; Vacaria, Brazil; Clay (i); W60; Singles – Doubles	(France) Séléna Janicijevic; 3–6, 6–3, 6–2	(Portugal) Francisca Jorge	(Argentina) María Lourdes Carlé (Argentina) Julia Riera	(Italy) Nicole Fossa Huergo (Argentina) Martina Capurro Taborda (Argentina) Solana Sierra (Brazil) Thaísa Grana Pedretti
December 11	Vacaria Open; Vacaria, Brazil; Clay (i); W60; Singles – Doubles	(Peru) Romina Ccuno (Lithuania) Justina Mikulskytė; 6–2, 6–3	(Portugal) Francisca Jorge (Portugal) Matilde Jorge	(Argentina) María Lourdes Carlé (Argentina) Julia Riera	(Italy) Nicole Fossa Huergo (Argentina) Martina Capurro Taborda (Argentina) Solana Sierra (Brazil) Thaísa Grana Pedretti
December 11	Sharm El Sheikh, Egypt; Hard; W25; Singles and doubles draws	(Georgia (country)) Mariam Bolkvadze; 6–2, 6–1	Elena Pridankina	Alexandra Shubladze (United Kingdom) Katy Dunne	(Egypt) Sandra Samir; Kira Pavlova (Romania) Karola Patricia Bejenaru; Marina Melnikova
December 11	Sharm El Sheikh, Egypt; Hard; W25; Singles and doubles draws	Victoria Mikhaylova; Mariia Tkacheva; 6–4, 3–6, [13–11]	(Poland) Maja Chwalińska (Poland) Gina Feistel	Alexandra Shubladze (United Kingdom) Katy Dunne	(Egypt) Sandra Samir; Kira Pavlova (Romania) Karola Patricia Bejenaru; Marina Melnikova
December 11	Monastir, Tunisia; Hard; W25; Singles and doubles draws	Alina Charaeva; 6–2, 6–4	(Spain) Guiomar Maristany	(Romania) Andreea Prisăcariu (Serbia) Lola Radivojević	(Italy) Nuria Brancaccio (Switzerland) Nadine Keller (Germany) Alexandra Vecic (Belgium) Magali Kempen
December 11	Monastir, Tunisia; Hard; W25; Singles and doubles draws	(Japan) Ayumi Koshiishi (China) Wang Jiaqi; Walkover	(France) Jenny Lim (France) Nina Radovanovic	(Romania) Andreea Prisăcariu (Serbia) Lola Radivojević	(Italy) Nuria Brancaccio (Switzerland) Nadine Keller (Germany) Alexandra Vecic (Belgium) Magali Kempen
December 11	Nairobi, Kenya; Clay; W25; Singles and doubles draws	(Ukraine) Valeriya Strakhova; 6–4, 5–7, 6–1	(France) Émeline Dartron	(France) Emma Léné (Burundi) Sada Nahimana	(Italy) Sofia Rocchetti (China) Lu Jiajing (Italy) Martina Colmegna (United States) Jessie Aney
December 11	Nairobi, Kenya; Clay; W25; Singles and doubles draws	(Sweden) Fanny Östlund (Ukraine) Valeriya Strakhova; 6–4, 7–6^{(7–5)}	(Japan) Nagomi Higashitani (Kenya) Angella Okutoyi	(France) Emma Léné (Burundi) Sada Nahimana	(Italy) Sofia Rocchetti (China) Lu Jiajing (Italy) Martina Colmegna (United States) Jessie Aney
December 11	Wellington, New Zealand; Hard; W15; Singles and doubles draws	(Japan) Mao Mushika; 6–2, 6–1	(Spain) Mercedes Aristegui	(Czech Republic) Michaela Bayerlová (Japan) Hikaru Sato	(Japan) Yuka Hosoki (Japan) Haine Ogata (New Zealand) Renee Zhang (Japan) Nanari Katsumi
December 11	Wellington, New Zealand; Hard; W15; Singles and doubles draws	(Japan) Yui Chikaraishi (Japan) Nanari Katsumi; 6–3, 6–3	(Australia) Ella Simmons (Australia) Belle Thompson	(Czech Republic) Michaela Bayerlová (Japan) Hikaru Sato	(Japan) Yuka Hosoki (Japan) Haine Ogata (New Zealand) Renee Zhang (Japan) Nanari Katsumi
December 11	Antalya, Turkey; Clay; W15; Singles and doubles draws	(Hungary) Amarissa Kiara Tóth; 6–2, 6–0	(Serbia) Jana Bojović	(Italy) Francesca Pace; Rada Zolotareva	(Germany) Nicole Rivkin (Switzerland) Marie Mettraux (Bulgaria) Julia Stamatova (Serbia) Natalija Senić
December 11	Antalya, Turkey; Clay; W15; Singles and doubles draws	(Hungary) Amarissa Kiara Tóth; Rada Zolotareva; 6–1, 6–4	(Netherlands) Rikke de Koning (Netherlands) Madelief Hageman	(Italy) Francesca Pace; Rada Zolotareva	(Germany) Nicole Rivkin (Switzerland) Marie Mettraux (Bulgaria) Julia Stamatova (Serbia) Natalija Senić
December 11	Melilla, Spain; Clay; W15; Singles and doubles draws	(France) Tiantsoa Sarah Rakotomanga Rajaonah; 6–2, ret.	(Portugal) Inês Murta	(Romania) Oana Georgeta Simion (Spain) Paula Arias Manjón	(Germany) Chantal Sauvant (Spain) África Burillo Berezak (Romania) Anastasia Safta (Italy) Giorgia Pinto
December 11	Melilla, Spain; Clay; W15; Singles and doubles draws	(Lithuania) Patricija Paukštytė (Germany) Chantal Sauvant; 6–4, 7–5	(Portugal) Inês Murta (Spain) Olga Parres Azcoitia	(Romania) Oana Georgeta Simion (Spain) Paula Arias Manjón	(Germany) Chantal Sauvant (Spain) África Burillo Berezak (Romania) Anastasia Safta (Italy) Giorgia Pinto
December 18	Papamoa, New Zealand; Hard; W25; Singles and doubles draws	(Australia) Talia Gibson; 6–3, 6–4	(Australia) Ivana Popovic	(New Zealand) Valentina Ivanov (Australia) Petra Hule	(Japan) Hikaru Sato (Japan) Mio Mushika (Australia) Maya Joint (New Zealand) Jade Otway
December 18	Papamoa, New Zealand; Hard; W25; Singles and doubles draws	(Japan) Mio Mushika (Japan) Hikaru Sato; 6–4, 5–7, [10–8]	(Czech Republic) Michaela Bayerlová (Australia) Alana Parnaby	(New Zealand) Valentina Ivanov (Australia) Petra Hule	(Japan) Hikaru Sato (Japan) Mio Mushika (Australia) Maya Joint (New Zealand) Jade Otway
December 18	Solapur, India; Hard; W25; Singles and doubles draws	(India) Sahaja Yamalapalli; 6–4, 6–3	Ekaterina Makarova	(Japan) Saki Imamura (Latvia) Diāna Marcinkēviča	(Japan) Hiromi Abe; Daria Kudashova (Greece) Sapfo Sakellaridi (India) Vaidehi Chaudhari
December 18	Solapur, India; Hard; W25; Singles and doubles draws	(Japan) Hiromi Abe (Japan) Saki Imamura; 6–3, 6–1	(Japan) Funa Kozaki (Japan) Misaki Matsuda	(Japan) Saki Imamura (Latvia) Diāna Marcinkēviča	(Japan) Hiromi Abe; Daria Kudashova (Greece) Sapfo Sakellaridi (India) Vaidehi Chaudhari
December 18	Nairobi, Kenya; Clay; W25; Singles and doubles draws	(Kenya) Angella Okutoyi; 6–3, 1–6, 6–1	(Germany) Lena Papadakis	(Sweden) Fanny Östlund (France) Lucie Nguyen Tan	(Ukraine) Valeriya Strakhova (France) Emma Léné (Italy) Miriana Tona (Burundi) Sada Nahimana
December 18	Nairobi, Kenya; Clay; W25; Singles and doubles draws	(Burundi) Sada Nahimana (Kenya) Angella Okutoyi; 6–4, 3–6, [10–7]	(United States) Jessie Aney (Germany) Lena Papadakis	(Sweden) Fanny Östlund (France) Lucie Nguyen Tan	(Ukraine) Valeriya Strakhova (France) Emma Léné (Italy) Miriana Tona (Burundi) Sada Nahimana
December 18	Antalya, Turkey; Clay; W15; Singles and doubles draws	(Romania) Anastasia Safta; 4–6, 6–0, 6–4	(Switzerland) Katerina Tsygourova	(Hungary) Panna Bartha; Diana Demidova	(Italy) Costanza Traversi (Bulgaria) Denislava Glushkova; Ekaterina Ivanova (Ukraine) Anastasiya Lopata
December 18	Antalya, Turkey; Clay; W15; Singles and doubles draws	(Romania) Anastasia Safta; Rada Zolotareva; 6–2, 6–0	(Hungary) Panna Bartha (Turkey) İlay Yörük	(Hungary) Panna Bartha; Diana Demidova	(Italy) Costanza Traversi (Bulgaria) Denislava Glushkova; Ekaterina Ivanova (Ukraine) Anastasiya Lopata
December 18	Monastir, Tunisia; Hard; W15; Singles and doubles draws	Daria Khomutsianskaya; 6–0, 4–2 ret.	(China) Wang Jiaqi	(Germany) Selina Dal (France) Nina Radovanovic	(Switzerland) Tess Sugnaux (Belgium) Tilwith Di Girolami (Netherlands) Stéphanie Judith Visscher (France) Marie Villet
December 18	Monastir, Tunisia; Hard; W15; Singles and doubles draws	(Germany) Selina Dal (Netherlands) Stéphanie Judith Visscher; 6–2, 6–3	(Tunisia) Chiraz Bechri; Milana Zhabrailova	(Germany) Selina Dal (France) Nina Radovanovic	(Switzerland) Tess Sugnaux (Belgium) Tilwith Di Girolami (Netherlands) Stéphanie Judith Visscher (France) Marie Villet
December 25
December 25	Navi Mumbai, India; Hard; W40; Singles and doubles draws	(Japan) Moyuka Uchijima; 6–4, 6–1	Ekaterina Makarova	(Latvia) Diāna Marcinkēviča (Japan) Misaki Matsuda	(Japan) Saki Imamura; Daria Kudashova; Ekaterina Yashina (Japan) Naho Sato
December 25	Navi Mumbai, India; Hard; W40; Singles and doubles draws	(Latvia) Kamilla Bartone; Ekaterina Makarova; 6–3, 1–6, [10–7]	(Japan) Funa Kozaki (Japan) Misaki Matsuda	(Latvia) Diāna Marcinkēviča (Japan) Misaki Matsuda	(Japan) Saki Imamura; Daria Kudashova; Ekaterina Yashina (Japan) Naho Sato
December 25	Monastir, Tunisia; Hard; W15; Singles and doubles draws	(France) Ksenia Efremova; 7–6^{(7–5)}, 6–0	(Germany) Selina Dal	Milana Zhabrailova (Romania) Ștefania Bojică	(Hong Kong) Adithya Karunaratne (Tunisia) Chiraz Bechri (Ukraine) Kateryna Lazarenko (China) Wang Jiaqi
December 25	Monastir, Tunisia; Hard; W15; Singles and doubles draws	(Morocco) Malak El Allami (Poland) Malwina Rowińska; 7–5, 6–1	(Turkey) Selina Atay; Anna Semenova	Milana Zhabrailova (Romania) Ștefania Bojică	(Hong Kong) Adithya Karunaratne (Tunisia) Chiraz Bechri (Ukraine) Kateryna Lazarenko (China) Wang Jiaqi
