= 2023 Vacaria Open – Doubles =

Doubles
- 2023 Vacaria Open

Final
- Champions: (Peru) Romina Ccuno (Lithuania) Justina Mikulskytė
- Runners-up: (Portugal) Francisca Jorge (Portugal) Matilde Jorge
- Score: 6–2, 6–3

Events
Singles	Doubles
Vacaria Open	· 2024 →

This was the first edition of the tournament.

Romina Ccuno and Justina Mikulskytė won the title, defeating Francisca Jorge and Matilde Jorge in the final, 6–2, 6–3.

== Seeds ==
1. (Portugal) Francisca Jorge / (Portugal) Matilde Jorge (final)
2. (Peru) Romina Ccuno / (Lithuania) Justina Mikulskytė (champions)
3. (Argentina) Martina Capurro Taborda / (Argentina) Julia Riera (first round)
4. (United States) Haley Giavara / (Argentina) Melany Solange Krywoj (first round)

== Draw ==
=== Key ===
- Q = Qualifier
- WC = Wild card
- LL = Lucky loser
- Alt = Alternate
- ITF = ITF entry
- PR = Protected ranking
- SR = Special ranking
- SE = Special exempt
- JE = Junior exempt
- JR = Junior Accelerator Programme entrant
- CO = College Accelerator Programme entrant
- NG = Next Gen Accelerator Program entrant
- w/o = Walkover
- r = Retired
- d = Defaulted

First round
1	(Portugal) F Jorge (Portugal) M Jorge	6	6
(Brazil) C Melleiro (Uruguay) J Rodríguez	0	1
(Brazil) B Bernardes (Brazil) B Melato	2	1
(Colombia) MP Pérez (Mexico) AS Sánchez	6	6
3	(Argentina) M Capurro Taborda (Argentina) J Riera	3	7	[4]
(Brazil) C Alves (Brazil) G Cé	6	5	[10]
WC	(Brazil) L Badia (Brazil) J Bortoluzzi Bianchin Bordignon	0	1
(Italy) N Fossa Huergo; D Lodikova	6	6
WC	(Brazil) Y Bohnenberger de Aguirres (Brazil) C Bohrer Martins	4	3
(Brazil) A Candiotto (Brazil) R Pereira	6	6
(Germany) J Jebawy (United States) A Ulyashchenko	6^{6}	6	[10]
4	(United States) H Giavara (Argentina) MS Krywoj	7^{8}	1	[0]
WC	(Brazil) ML Oliveira (Brazil) L Silvestre da Rosa	6	1	[4]
(Colombia) Y Monroy (Brazil) TG Pedretti	3	6	[10]
(Brazil) MC Ferreira Turchetto (Brazil) L Fullana	2	4
2	(Peru) R Ccuno (Lithuania) J Mikulskytė	6	6

Quarterfinals
1	(Portugal) F Jorge (Portugal) M Jorge	6	6
(Colombia) MP Pérez (Mexico) AS Sánchez	3	1
(Brazil) C Alves (Brazil) G Cé	5	0
(Italy) N Fossa Huergo; D Lodikova	7	6
(Brazil) A Candiotto (Brazil) R Pereira	6	6^{3}	[10]
(Germany) J Jebawy (United States) A Ulyashchenko	3	7^{7}	[4]
(Colombia) Y Monroy (Brazil) TG Pedretti	3	6	[2]
2	(Peru) R Ccuno (Lithuania) J Mikulskytė	6	2	[10]

Semifinals
1	(Portugal) F Jorge (Portugal) M Jorge	6	6
(Italy) N Fossa Huergo; D Lodikova	3	1
(Brazil) A Candiotto (Brazil) R Pereira	6	3	[6]
2	(Peru) R Ccuno (Lithuania) J Mikulskytė	2	6	[10]

Final
1	(Portugal) F Jorge (Portugal) M Jorge	2	3
2	(Peru) R Ccuno (Lithuania) J Mikulskytė	6	6
