= 2023 Vacaria Open – Singles =

Singles
- 2023 Vacaria Open

Final
- Champion: (France) Séléna Janicijevic
- Runner-up: (Portugal) Francisca Jorge
- Score: 3–6, 6–3, 6–2

Events
Singles	Doubles
Vacaria Open	· 2024 →

This was the first edition of the tournament.

Séléna Janicijevic won the title, defeating Francisca Jorge in the final, 3–6, 6–3, 6–2.

== Seeds ==
1. (Argentina) María Lourdes Carlé (semifinals)
2. (Argentina) Julia Riera (semifinals)
3. (Argentina) Martina Capurro Taborda (quarterfinals)
4. (Argentina) Solana Sierra (quarterfinals)
5. (Lithuania) Justina Mikulskytė (second round)
6. (Portugal) Francisca Jorge (final)
7. (France) Séléna Janicijevic (champion)
8. (United States) Maria Mateas (second round, retired)

== Draw ==
=== Key ===
- Q = Qualifier
- WC = Wild card
- LL = Lucky loser
- Alt = Alternate
- ITF = ITF entry
- PR = Protected ranking
- SR = Special ranking
- SE = Special exempt
- JE = Junior exempt
- JR = Junior Accelerator Programme entrant
- CO = College Accelerator Programme entrant
- NG = Next Gen Accelerator Program entrant
- w/o = Walkover
- r = Retired
- d = Defaulted

=== Finals ===
Semifinals
1	(Argentina) María Lourdes Carlé	3	2
6	(Portugal) Francisca Jorge	6	6
7	(France) Séléna Janicijevic	6	3	6
2	(Argentina) Julia Riera	3	6	4

Final
6	(Portugal) Francisca Jorge	6	3	2
7	(France) Séléna Janicijevic	3	6	6

=== Top half ===
First round
1	(Argentina) ML Carlé	6	6
WC	(Brazil) L Badia	1	2
(United States) H Giavara	7	6
Q	(United States) A Harmon	5	2
(Italy) N Fossa Huergo	6	6
(Brazil) A Candiotto	2	4
D Lodikova	3	4
5	(Lithuania) J Mikulskytė	6	6
3	(Argentina) M Capurro Taborda	6	6
Q	(Brazil) C Bossi	3	3
(Portugal) M Jorge	6	6
WC	(Brazil) C Bohrer Martins	1	1
Q	(South Africa) W Mdlulwa	3	2
Q	(Colombia) MP Pérez	6	6
(United States) R Kingsley	6	4	3
6	(Portugal) F Jorge	4	6	6

Second round
1	(Argentina) ML Carlé	6	7
(United States) H Giavara	2	5
(Italy) N Fossa Huergo	6	6
5	(Lithuania) J Mikulskytė	3	4
3	(Argentina) M Capurro Taborda	1	6	6
(Portugal) M Jorge	6	1	4
Q	(Colombia) MP Pérez	6^{0}	0
6	(Portugal) F Jorge	7^{7}	6

Quarterfinals
1	(Argentina) ML Carlé	6	6
(Italy) N Fossa Huergo	1	2
3	(Argentina) M Capurro Taborda	3	4
6	(Portugal) F Jorge	6	6

Semifinals
1	(Argentina) ML Carlé	3	2
6	(Portugal) F Jorge	6	6

=== Bottom half ===
First round
7	(France) S Janicijevic	6	6
WC	(Brazil) S Mendonça	1	0
Q	(Germany) J Jebawy	1	2
(Brazil) C Alves	6	6
(Mexico) AS Sánchez	2	1
WC	(Brazil) L Fullana	6	6
Q	(Peru) R Ccuno	0	1
4	(Argentina) S Sierra	6	6
8	(United States) M Mateas	7^{7}	7^{7}
(Argentina) MS Krywoj	6^{5}	6^{3}
(Brazil) G Cé	3	1
(Brazil) TG Pedretti	6	6
(Slovakia) M Okáľová	6	6
Q	(Colombia) Y Monroy	1	2
Q	(United States) A Ulyashchenko	2	2
2	(Argentina) J Riera	6	6

Second round
7	(France) S Janicijevic	6	6
(Brazil) C Alves	0	1
WC	(Brazil) L Fullana	2	6	3
4	(Argentina) S Sierra	6	3	6
8	(United States) M Mateas	4	0^{r}
(Brazil) TG Pedretti	6	3
(Slovakia) M Okáľová	1	1
2	(Argentina) J Riera	6	6

Quarterfinals
7	(France) S Janicijevic	7^{7}	6
4	(Argentina) S Sierra	6^{4}	4
(Brazil) TG Pedretti	6^{5}	4
2	(Argentina) J Riera	7^{7}	6

Semifinals
7	(France) S Janicijevic	6	3	6
2	(Argentina) J Riera	3	6	4
