= 2023 Vacaria Open =

Tennis tournament

- Date: 11–17 December 2023
- Edition: 1st
- Category: ITF Women's World Tennis Tour
- Prize money: $60,000
- Surface: Clay / Indoor
- Location: Vacaria, Brazil

Champions

Singles
- (France) Séléna Janicijevic

Doubles
- (Peru) Romina Ccuno / (Lithuania) Justina Mikulskytė
Vacaria Open	· 2024 →

The 2023 Vacaria Open was a professional tennis tournament played on indoor clay courts. It was the first edition of the tournament, which was part of the 2023 ITF Women's World Tennis Tour. It took place in Vacaria, Brazil, between 11 and 17 December 2023.

== Champions ==
=== Singles ===
- (France) Séléna Janicijevic def. (Portugal) Francisca Jorge, 3–6, 6–3, 6–2

=== Doubles ===
- (Peru) Romina Ccuno / (Lithuania) Justina Mikulskytė def. (Portugal) Francisca Jorge / (Portugal) Matilde Jorge, 6–2, 6–3

== Singles main draw entrants ==
=== Seeds ===
Country	Player	Rank	Seed
ARG	María Lourdes Carlé	140	1
ARG	Julia Riera	148	2
ARG	Martina Capurro Taborda	157	3
ARG	Solana Sierra	193	4
LTU	Justina Mikulskytė	259	5
POR	Francisca Jorge	266	6
FRA	Séléna Janicijevic	287	7
USA	Maria Mateas	297	8

- Rankings are as of 4 December 2023.

=== Other entrants ===
The following players received wildcards into the singles main draw:

- (Brazil) Laura Badia
- (Brazil) Carolina Bohrer Martins
- (Brazil) Luiza Fullana
- (Brazil) Sofia Mendonça

The following players received entry from the qualifying draw:

- (Brazil) Camilla Bossi
- (Peru) Romina Ccuno
- (United States) Alexia Harmon
- (Germany) Jasmin Jebawy
- (South Africa) Wozuko Mdlulwa
- (Colombia) Yuliana Monroy
- (Colombia) María Paulina Pérez
- (United States) Anna Ulyashchenko
