= Vacaria Open =

- 2023 Vacaria Open

Women's World Tennis Tour
- Event name: Vacaria Open
- Location: Vacaria, Brazil
- Venue: Tênis Santa Teresa
- Category: ITF Women's World Tennis Tour
- Surface: Clay / Indoor
- Draw: 32S/32Q/16D
- Prize money: $75,000

The Vacaria Open was a tournament for professional female tennis players played on indoor clay courts. The event was classified as a $75,000 ITF Women's World Tennis Tour tournament and was held in Vacaria, Brazil, from 2023 to 2026.

== Past finals ==
=== Singles ===
Year	Champion	Runner-up	Score
2026	(Argentina) Julia Riera	(Peru) Lucciana Pérez Alarcón	7–5, 6–0
2025 (2)	(United Kingdom) Francesca Jones	(France) Léolia Jeanjean	1–6, 6–4, 6–1
2025	(Italy) Aurora Zantedeschi	Iryna Shymanovich	4–6, 7–5, 7–5
2024	Not held		
2023	(France) Séléna Janicijevic	(Portugal) Francisca Jorge	3–6, 6–3, 6–2

=== Doubles ===
Year	Champions	Runners-up	Score
2026	(Brazil) Naná Silva (Brazil) Laura Pigossi	(United States) Isabella Barrera Aguirre (Brazil) Carolina Bohrer Martins	4–6, 6–2, [10–6]
2025 (2)	(United States) Robin Anderson (Spain) Alicia Herrero Liñana	(Greece) Despina Papamichail (Argentina) Julia Riera	7–5, 6–4
2025	(Czech Republic) Michaela Bayerlová (Italy) Miriana Tona	(United States) Robin Anderson (Spain) Alicia Herrero Liñana	6–7^{(4–7)}, 7–6^{(7–5)}, [10–7]
2024	Not held		
2023	(Peru) Romina Ccuno (Lithuania) Justina Mikulskytė	(Portugal) Francisca Jorge (Portugal) Matilde Jorge	6–2, 6–3
