= Ginevra Parentini Vallega Montebruno =

Italian tennis player (born 2003)

- Country (sports): Italy
- Born: 4 April 2003 (age 23)
- Height: 1.83 m (6 ft 0 in)
- Plays: Right-handed
- Prize money: US $250,919

Singles
- Career record: 104–99
- Highest ranking: No. 1,162 (19 November 2022)
- Current ranking: No. 1,332 (9 November 2026)

Doubles
- Career record: 52–78
- Career titles: 1 ITF
- Highest ranking: No. 590 (2 November 2026)
- Current ranking: No. 590 (9 November 2026)
- Last updated on: 13 November 2026.

Ginevra Parentini Vallega Montebruno is an Italian tennis player. She has a career high WTA singles ranking of No. 1,162 achieved on 19 November 2022 and a career-high doubles ranking of No. 590 reached on 9 November 2026. She has won 1 ITF doubles title

== ITF Tour titles ==
=== Doubles: 4 (1 title, 3 runner–ups) ===
Legend W25/35 tournaments (0–1) W15 tournaments (1–2)	Finals by surface Clay (1–3)

Result	W–L	Date	Tournament	Tier	Surface	Partner	Opponents	Score
Loss	0–1	Oct 2022	ITF Heraklion, Greece	W15	Clay	(North Macedonia) Aleksandra Simeva	(United Kingdom) Lauryn John-Baptiste (Ukraine) Oleksandra Oliynykova	0–6, 1–6
Loss	0–2	May 2026	ITF Tsaghkadzor, Armenia	W15	Clay	(Iran) Meshkatolzahra Safi	(Kazakhstan) Aruzhan Sagandykova (Uzbekistan) Sevil Yuldasheva	5–7, 2–6
Loss	0–3	Jul 2026	ITF Torino, Italy	W35	Clay	(Italy) Jessica Bertoldo	(Italy) Gaia Maduzzi (Italy) Vittoria Paganetti	2–6, 5–7
Win	1–3	Nov 2026	ITF Nules, Spain	W15	Clay	(Italy) Chiara Fornasieri	(Norway) Astrid Wanja Brune Olsen (Germany) Franziska Sziedat	4–6, 6–4, [10–7]
