= Martina Capurro Taborda =

Argentine tennis player

Martina Capurro
- Full name: Martina Capurro Taborda
- Country (sports): Argentina
- Born: 4 December 1997 (age 28) Avellaneda
- Plays: Left (two-handed backhand)
- Prize money: $240,132

Singles
- Career record: 281–169
- Career titles: 11 ITF
- Highest ranking: No. 149 (15 January 2024)
- Current ranking: No. 240 (27 July 2026)

Grand Slam singles results
- Australian Open: Q1 (2024)
- French Open: Q1 (2024)
- Wimbledon: Q1 (2024)

Doubles
- Career record: 122–103
- Career titles: 10 ITF
- Highest ranking: No. 376 (20 April 20236)
- Current ranking: No. 463 (27 July 2026)
Medal record
Women's tennis
Representing Argentina
Pan American Games
Bronze medal – third place	2023 Santiago	Mixed doubles
- Last updated on: 5 August 2026.

Martina Capurro Taborda (Note: In this Spanish name, the first or paternal surname is Capurro and the second or maternal family name is Taborda.) (born 4 December 1997) is an Argentine tennis player.

She has a career-high singles ranking by the WTA of No. 149, achieved on 15 January 2024. She also has a career-high WTA doubles ranking of No. 376, attained on 20 April 2026.

Capurro Taborda made her WTA Tour main-draw debut at the 2016 Brasil Tennis Cup, where she entered the tournament as a lucky loser, after losing in the final qualifying round.

== Grand Slam singles performance timeline ==
Key
W	F	SF	QF	#R	RR	Q#	DNQ	A	NH

(W) winner; (F) finalist; (SF) semifinalist; (QF) quarterfinalist; (#R) rounds 4, 3, 2, 1; (RR) round-robin stage; (Q#) qualification round; (DNQ) did not qualify; (A) absent; (NH) not held; (SR) strike rate (events won / competed); (W–L) win–loss record.
To avoid confusion and double counting, these charts are updated at the conclusion of a tournament or when the player's participation has ended.

=== Singles ===
Tournament	2024	2025	W–L
Australian Open	Q1	A	0–0
French Open	Q1	A	0–0
Wimbledon	Q1	A	0–0
US Open	A	A	0–0
Win–loss	0–0	0–0	0–0

== WTA 125 finals ==
=== Singles: 1 (runner-up) ===
Result	W–L	Date	Tournament	Surface	Opponent	Score
Loss	0–1	Nov 2023	Brasil Tennis Cup, Brazil	Clay	(Australia) Ajla Tomljanović	1–6, 5–7

== ITF Circuit finals ==
=== Singles: 19 (11 titles, 8 runner-ups) ===
Legend W100 tournaments (0–1) W25/35 tournaments (6–3) W10/15 tournaments (5–4)	Finals by surface Hard (1–1) Clay (10–7)

Result	W–L	Date	Tournament	Tier	Surface	Opponent	Score
Loss	0–1	Jun 2016	ITF Buenos Aires, Argentina	W10	Clay	(Argentina) Victoria Bosio	0–6, 2–6
Win	1–1	Apr 2022	ITF São Paulo, Brazil	W15	Clay	(Switzerland) Nadine Keller	6–1, 6–3
Loss	1–2	May 2022	ITF Curitiba, Brazil	W15	Clay	(Slovakia) Bianca Behúlová	4–6, 6–7^{(2)}
Win	2–2	May 2022	ITF São Paulo, Brazil	W15	Clay	(Bolivia) Noelia Zeballos	2–6, 6–3, 6–0
Win	3–2	Jun 2023	ITF Santo Domingo, Dominican Republic	W25	Clay	(Switzerland) Leonie Küng	6–2, 6–4
Win	4–2	Jul 2023	ITF Santo Domingo, Dominican Republic	W25	Clay	(Bulgaria) Gergana Topalova	3–6, 6–0, 6–0
Win	5–2	Jul 2023	ITF Punta Cana, Dominican Republic	W25	Clay	Ekaterina Makarova	1–6, 6–4, 6–4
Win	6–2	Jul 2023	ITF Bragado, Argentina	W25	Clay	(Argentina) Solana Sierra	6–4, 6–1
Win	7–2	Aug 2023	ITF Junin, Argentina	W25	Clay	(Argentina) Solana Sierra	3–6, 7–6^{(2)}, 6–1
Loss	7–3	Oct 2023	ITF Mendoza, Argentina	W25	Clay	(Argentina) Solana Sierra	1–6, 3–6
Win	8–3	May 2025	ITF Trelew, Argentina	W15	Hard (i)	(Argentina) Victoria Bosio	3–6, 6–2, 6–1
Loss	8–4	May 2025	ITF Trelew, Argentina	W15	Hard (i)	(Argentina) Victoria Bosio	6–7^{(1)}, 4–6
Loss	8–5	Sep 2025	ITF São Luís, Brazil	W15	Clay	(United States) Hibah Shaikh	5–7, 2–6
Win	9–5	Sep 2025	ITF Luján, Argentina	W15	Clay	(Argentina) María Florencia Urrutia	7–5, 6–4
Win	10–5	Sep 2025	ITF Luján, Argentina	W15	Clay	(Chile) Fernanda Labraña	3–6, 7–6^{(1)}, 6–4
Win	11–5	Oct 2025	ITF Neuquén, Argentina	W35	Clay	(Chile) Fernanda Labraña	6–1, 6–0
Loss	11–6	Mar 2026	ITF Junin, Argentina	W35	Clay	(Argentina) Luisina Giovannini	6–7^{(3)}, 2–6
Loss	11–7	Mar 2026	ITF Junin, Argentina	W35	Clay	(Argentina) Luisina Giovannini	4–6, 5–7
Loss	11–8	Apr 2026	Charlottesville Open, United States	W100	Clay	(Mexico) Renata Zarazúa	1–6, 6–1, 5–7

=== Doubles: 14 (10 titles, 4 runner-ups) ===
Legend W25/35 tournaments (4–1) W15 tournaments (6–3)	Finals by surface Hard (1–1) Clay (9–3)

Result	W–L	Date	Tournament	Tier	Surface	Partner	Opponents	Score
Loss	0–1	Aug 2018	ITF Guayaquil, Ecuador	W15	Clay	(Ecuador) Camila Romero	(Chile) Fernanda Brito (Argentina) Sofía Luini	6–7^{(5)}, 3–6
Loss	0–2	Jun 2019	ITF Tabarka, Tunisia	W15	Clay	(Italy) Anna Turati	(Sweden) Fanny Östlund (Sweden) Alexandra Viktorovitch	3–6, 6–2, [8–10]
Win	1–2	Jul 2019	ITF Tabarka, Tunisia	W15	Clay	(Colombia) Yuliana Lizarazo	(Netherlands) Diana Chehoudi (Netherlands) Noa Liauw a Fong	6–2, 6–1
Win	2–2	Apr 2022	ITF São Paulo, Brazil	W15	Clay	(Chile) Fernanda Labraña	(Chile) Fernanda Astete (Mexico) Marian Gómez Pezuela	6–2, 6–1
Win	3–2	May 2022	ITF Curitiba, Brazil	W15	Clay	(Chile) Fernanda Labraña	(Portugal) Ana Filipa Santos (Bolivia) Noelia Zeballos	6–1, 6–4
Win	4–2	May 2022	ITF São Paulo, Brazil	W15	Clay	(Chile) Fernanda Labraña	(Peru) Romina Ccuno (Bolivia) Noelia Zeballos	7–6^{(1)}, 3–6, [10–7]
Loss	4–3	Jul 2023	ITF Santo Domingo, Dominican Republic	W25	Clay	(Spain) Noelia Bouzo Zanotti	(Switzerland) Leonie Küng; Ksenia Laskutova	4–6, 6–3, [3–10]
Win	5–3	Sep 2023	ITF Luján, Argentina	W25	Clay	(Chile) Fernanda Labraña	(Italy) Nicole Fossa Huergo (Germany) Luisa Meyer auf der Heide	6–2, 7–5
Win	6–3	May 2025	ITF Trelew, Argentina	W15	Hard (i)	(Mexico) Marian Gómez Pezuela	(Argentina) Luciana Moyano (Ecuador) Camila Romero	6–0, 7–6^{(7)}
Loss	6–4	May 2025	ITF Trelew, Argentina	W15	Hard (i)	(Mexico) Marian Gómez Pezuela	(Argentina) Luciana Moyano (Ecuador) Camila Romero	1–6, 4–6
Win	7–4	Jul 2025	ITF Pergamino, Argentina	W35	Clay	(Argentina) Julia Riera	(Argentina) Luisina Giovannini (Mexico) Marian Gómez Pezuela	6–4, 6–2
Win	8–4	Sep 2025	ITF Cuiabá, Brazil	W35	Clay	(Mexico) Marian Gómez Pezuela	(Peru) Romina Ccuno (Colombia) María Paulina Pérez	6–4, 6–3
Win	9–4	Sep 2025	ITF Luján, Argentina	W15	Clay	(Chile) Fernanda Labraña	(Argentina) Luciana Moyano (Ecuador) Camila Romero	6–2, 7–6^{(4)}
Win	10–4	Mar 2026	ITF Junin, Argentina	W35	Clay	(Poland) Gina Feistel	(Argentina) Luisina Giovannini (Mexico) Marian Gómez Pezuela	7–5, 6–3
