= Romina Ccuno =

Peruvian tennis player (born 2002)

- Full name: Romina Berenice Ccuno Villanueva
- Country (sports): Peru
- Born: 1 September 2002 (age 23) Arequipa, Peru
- Plays: Right (two-handed backhand)
- Prize money: US$48,939

Singles
- Career record: 95–83
- Career titles: 0
- Highest ranking: No. 628 (20 March 2023)
- Current ranking: No. 719 (25 August 2025)

Doubles
- Career record: 126–67
- Career titles: 13 ITF
- Highest ranking: No. 238 (29 July 2024)
- Current ranking: No. 404 (25 August 2025)

Team competitions
- Fed Cup: 5–14
- Last updated on: 25 August 2025.

Romina Ccuno (born 1 September 2002) is a Peruvian tennis player.

Ccuno has career-high rankings by the WTA of 628 in singles and 238 in doubles. Up to date, she has won 10 doubles titles on the ITF Circuit.

Playing for Peru Fed Cup team, Ccuno has a win–loss record of 5–14 in Fed Cup competitions.

== ITF Circuit finals ==
=== Singles: 2 (2 runner–ups) ===
Legend W15 tournaments (0–2)	Finals by surface Clay (0–2)

Result	W–L	Date	Tournament	Tier	Surface	Opponent	Score
Loss	0–1	Aug 2019	ITF La Paz, Bolivia	W15	Clay	(Argentina) Jazmín Ortenzi	3–6, 3–6
Loss	0–2	Jun 2023	ITF Buenos Aire, Argentina	W15	Clay	(Ecuador) Mell Elizabeth Reasco González	3–6, 2–6

=== Doubles: 26 (13 titles, 13 runner–ups) ===
Legend W60 tournaments (1–0) W25/35 tournaments (6–7) W15 tournaments (6–6)	Finals by surface Clay (13–13)

Result	W–L	Date	Tournament	Tier	Surface	Partner	Opponents	Score
Loss	0–1	Aug 2019	ITF La Paz, Bolivia	W15	Clay	(Colombia) Antonia Samudio	(Argentina) Jazmín Ortenzi (Bolivia) Noelia Zeballos	2–6, 6–1, [4–10]
Win	1–1	Oct 2019	ITF Santiago, Chile	W15	Clay	(Guatemala) Melissa Morales	(Ecuador) Mell Elizabeth Reasco González (Colombia) Antonia Samudio	6–3, 6–3
Win	2–1	Sep 2021	ITF Ibagué, Colombia	W15	Clay	(Colombia) María Camila Torres Murcia	(Slovakia) Alica Rusová (Colombia) Antonia Samudio	3–6, 6–4, [10–5]
Loss	2–2	May 2022	ITF São Paulo, Brazil	W15	Clay	(Bolivia) Noelia Zeballos	(Argentina) Martina Capurro Taborda (Chile) Fernanda Labraña	6–7^{(1)}, 6–3, [7–10]
Loss	2–3	Sep 2022	ITF Guayaquil, Ecuador	W15	Clay	(Colombia) María Herazo González	(Colombia) María Paulina Pérez García (United States) Sofia Sewing	4–6, 6–1, [2–10]
Win	3–3	Oct 2022	ITF Guayaquil, Ecuador	W15	Clay	(Colombia) María Herazo González	(Colombia) María Paulina Pérez García (United States) Sofia Sewing	6–2, 5–7, [11–9]
Loss	3–4	Oct 2022	ITF Bucaramanga, Colombia	W15	Clay	(Colombia) María Paulina Pérez García	(Netherlands) Lexie Stevens (Ukraine) Valeriya Strakhova	6–7^{(4)}, 3–6
Loss	3–5	Nov 2022	ITF Lima, Peru	W15	Clay	(Colombia) María Camila Torres Murcia	(Peru) Lucciana Pérez Alarcón (Peru) Anastasia Iamachkine	2–6, 4–6
Win	4–5	Nov 2022	ITF Lima, Peru	W15	Clay	(Colombia) María Herazo González	(Peru) Leslie Espinoza Gamarra (Peru) Anastasia Iamachkine	6–1, 6–3
Loss	4–6	Jan 2023	ITF Buenos Aires, Argentina	W25	Clay	(Colombia) María Herazo González	(Ukraine) Valeriya Strakhova; Amina Anshba	1–6, 2–6
Win	5–6	Jul 2023	ITF Bragado, Argentina	W25	Clay	(Mexico) Victoria Rodríguez	(Argentina) Luciana Moyano (Argentina) Candela Vasquez	6–2, 6–3
Win	6–6	Jul 2023	ITF Junín, Argentina	W25	Clay	(Mexico) Victoria Rodríguez	(Argentina) Julieta Lara Estable (Chile) Fernanda Labraña	6–2, 6–3
Win	7–6	Aug 2023	ITF Lima, Peru	W15	Clay	(Chile) Fernanda Labraña	(Argentina) Lourdes Ayala (Argentina) Julieta Lara Estable	6–1, 6–3
Win	8–6	Oct 2023	ITF Mendoza, Argentina	W25	Clay	(Mexico) Victoria Rodríguez	(Italy) Nicole Fossa Huergo (Germany) Luisa Meyer auf der Heide	6–3, 6–3
Win	9–6	Dec 2023	ITF Vacaria, Brazil	W60	Clay (i)	(Lithuania) Justina Mikulskytė	(Portugal) Francisca Jorge (Portugal) Matilde Jorge	6–2, 6–3
Loss	9–7	Jan 2024	ITF Buenos Aires, Argentina	W35	Clay	Daria Lodikova	(United States) Jamie Loeb (Mexico) Ana Sofía Sánchez	5–7, 6–7^{(2)}
Loss	9–8	Jul 2024	ITF Luján, Argentina	W15	Clay	(Argentina) María Florencia Urrutia	(Argentina) Jazmín Ortenzi (Peru) Lucciana Pérez Alarcón	4–6, 5–7
Loss	9–9	Jul 2024	ITF Luján, Argentina	W15	Clay	(Peru) Lucciana Pérez Alarcón	(Argentina) Luisina Giovannini (Mexico) Marian Gómez Pezuela Cano	0–6, 2–6
Win	10–9	Nov 2024	ITF Ribeirão Preto, Brazil	W15	Clay	(Chile) Fernanda Labraña	(Brazil) Camilla Bossi (Brazil) Ana Candiotto	6–1, 2–6, [10–7]
Win	11–9	Apr 2025	ITF Leme, Brazil	W35	Clay	(Chile) Fernanda Labraña	(Argentina) Luciana Moyano (Bolivia) Noelia Zeballos	6–2, 7–5
Win	12–9	Aug 2025	ITF Santiago, Chile	W15	Clay	(Chile) Fernanda Labraña	(Italy) Beatrice Stagno (Chile) Antonia Vergara Rivera	6–1, 6–3
Win	13–9	Aug 2025	ITF Santiago, Chile	W15	Clay	(Chile) Fernanda Labraña	(Ecuador) Camila Romero (Chile) Antonia Vergara Rivera	6–2, 6–3
Loss	13–10	Aug 2025	ITF Cuiabá, Brazil	W35	Clay	(Colombia) María Paulina Pérez	(Argentina) Martina Capurro Taborda (Mexico) Marian Gómez Pezuela Cano	4–6, 3–6
Loss	13–11	Mar 2026	ITF Santiago, Chile	W15	Clay	(Chile) Fernanda Labraña	(Brazil) Ana Candiotto (Chile) Antonia Vergara Rivera	1–6, 3–6
Loss	13–12	Mar 2026	ITF Santiago, Chile	W15	Clay	(Chile) Fernanda Labraña	(Argentina) Luciana Moyano (Chile) Antonia Vergara Rivera	6–3, 0–6, [6–10]
Loss	13–13	Jun 2026	ITF Asunción, Paraguay	W15	Clay	(Brazil) Júlia Konishi Camargo Silva	(United States) Isabella Barrera Aguirre (Argentina) Sofía Meabe	2–6, 5–7
