= Tennis at the 2024 Summer Olympics – Qualification =

Qualification
- Tennis at the 2024 Summer Olympics

Events
Singles	men	women
Doubles	men	women	mixed
Qualification
- Summer Olympics

This article details the qualifying phase for tennis at the 2024 Summer Olympics. The qualification pathway will be determined primarily based on the rankings maintained by the Association of Tennis Professionals (ATP) and the Women's Tennis Association (WTA).

== Qualifying criteria ==
The main qualifying criterion will be the players' positions on the ATP and WTA ranking lists published on 10 June 2024. The players entering are formally submitted by the International Tennis Federation. The ATP and WTA rankings will be determined based on the performances achieved in the previous 52 weeks of the qualifying window. To be eligible, the players must satisfy the key criteria as part of the nominated team in two Billie Jean King Cup (women) or Davis Cup (men) events between Tokyo 2020 and Paris 2024 (with one of the nominations occurring in 2023 or 2024), either if their nation competes at the Zone Group round robin level for the third year of the quadrennial cycle or if the player has represented their nation at least twenty times.

Each National Olympic Committee (NOC) can enter a maximum of twelve tennis players (six per gender) with a maximum of four entries each in the men's and women's singles (the best ranked within their respective country), two pairs each in the men's and women's doubles and a single pair in the mixed doubles.

For the singles, the top 56 players in the world rankings on 10 June 2024 of the ATP and WTA tours will qualify for the Olympics, respecting the four-player limit per NOC and gender. Hence, those ranked outside the top 56 and from NOCs with less than four entries are permitted to compete. A player could only participate if he or she is allowed and drafted to represent the player's country in Davis Cup or Billie Jean King Cup for three of the following years: 2022, 2023, and 2024, unless given an exemption by the International Tennis Federation. Four of the remaining eight slots are attributed to the NOCs who have not already qualified four tennis players across three continental zones (the winner and runner-up from the 2023 Pan American Games; the gold medalist each from the 2022 Asian Games and 2023 African Games). The final four spots are reserved, one for the host nation France, two for previous Olympic gold medalists or Grand Slam champions, and one for applicants for the Universality place.

For the men's and women's doubles, there are 32 spots for the highest-ranked teams, with 10 of them reserved for players in the top 10 of the doubles rankings, who could select his or her partner from their NOC provided they are ranked in the top 400 in either singles or doubles. The remaining spots are attributed to the pairs with the highest combined ranking (i.e. the sum of either the singles or doubles ranking) until the 32-team field is complete. If the total quota of 86 players in the relevant gender remains incomplete, additional places continue to be allotted through the combined ranking. Once the field completes, the remaining pairs with both players qualified in the singles are officially selected based on their highest combined ranking; otherwise, additional places are assigned to the pairs with one player qualified in singles, followed by the remaining pairs without any qualified player in the singles tournament, if necessary. One team per gender is reserved for the host nation France if none has already become eligible otherwise.

With no quota places available for the mixed doubles, all teams will consist of players already entered in either the singles or doubles, including the top 15 combined ranking teams and the host nation France.

== Qualified players ==
The following tables reflect the official entry lists for the men's and women's singles as well as the men's and women's doubles. For the mixed doubles, the final entry list is to be determined by the ITF on 24 July.

Ranking figures for all lists are based on the ATP and WTA world rankings of 10 June 2024, the cut-off for the Olympic tennis event.

^{a}	Player did not enter due to: Because of injury; Declined to compete; Was not selected by their governing body; Ineligible to compete (Individual Neutral Athletes)
^{b}	Player failed to fulfill the minimum Billie Jean King Cup / Davis Cup representation level
^{c}	Player is ineligible because of the four-player limit per NOC
^{d}	Player officially retired from the sport
^{e}	Player received special dispensation for the Billie Jean King Cup / Davis Cup requirements from the ITF

=== Men's singles ===
No.	Rank	Player	NOC	ATP Points	NOC Rank
World ranking
^{a}	1	Jannik Sinner	Italy	9,570	–
1	2	Novak Djokovic	Serbia	8,460	1
2^{e}	3	Carlos Alcaraz	Spain	8,130	1
3	4	Alexander Zverev	Germany	7,295	1
4	5	Daniil Medvedev	Individual Neutral Athletes	6,525	1
^{a}	6	Andrey Rublev	Individual Neutral Athletes	4,710	–
5	7	Casper Ruud	Norway	4,025	1
^{a}	8	Hubert Hurkacz	Poland	3,955	–
a	9	Alex de Minaur	Australia	3,845	–
6	9^{PR(264)}	Rafael Nadal	Spain	215	2
^{b}	10	Grigor Dimitrov	Bulgaria	3,775	–
7	11	Stefanos Tsitsipas	Greece	3,740	1
8	12	Taylor Fritz	United States	3,090	1
9	13	Tommy Paul	United States	2,710	2
^{a}	14	Ben Shelton	United States	2,590	–
^{a}	15	Holger Rune	Denmark	2,540	–
10	16	Ugo Humbert	France	2,250	1
11	17	Alexander Bublik	Kazakhstan	2,140	1
12	18	Félix Auger-Aliassime	Canada	2,075	1
13	19	Sebastián Báez	Argentina	2,030	1
14	20	Nicolás Jarry	Chile	1,905	1
^{a}	21	Adrian Mannarino	France	1,865	–
^{a}	22	Karen Khachanov	Individual Neutral Athletes	1,780	–
15	23	Tallon Griekspoor	Netherlands	1,690	1
16	24	Alejandro Tabilo	Chile	1,639	2
^{a}	25	Jiří Lehečka	Czech Republic	1,630	–
^{a}	26	Sebastian Korda	United States	1,620	–
17	27	Francisco Cerúndolo	Argentina	1,610	2
^{a}	28	Frances Tiafoe	United States	1,590	–
18^{e}	29	Mariano Navone	Argentina	1,382	3
19	30	Lorenzo Musetti	Italy	1,290	1
20	31	Tomás Martín Etcheverry	Argentina	1,290	4
^{a}	32	Alejandro Davidovich Fokina	Spain	1,240	–
21	33	Tomáš Macháč	Czech Republic	1,225	1
22	33^{PR(197)}	Milos Raonic	Canada	305	2
23	34	Matteo Arnaldi	Italy	1,220	2
24	35	Jan-Lennard Struff	Germany	1,180	2
25	36	Gaël Monfils	France	1,160	2
^{a}	37	Jordan Thompson	Australia	1,156	–
26	38	Arthur Fils	France	1,155	3
a	39	Cameron Norrie	Great Britain	1,150	–
27	40	Jack Draper	Great Britain	1,131	1
28^{e}	41	Luciano Darderi	Italy	1,126	3
29	42	Fábián Marozsán	Hungary	1,122	1
30	43	Roman Safiullin	Individual Neutral Athletes	1,097	2
As1	44	Zhang Zhizhen	China	1,066	1
31	45	Christopher Eubanks	United States	1,017	3
^{a}	46	Laslo Djere	Serbia	975	–
32	47	Pedro Martínez	Spain	975	3
33	48	Nuno Borges	Portugal	971	1
34	48^{PR(286)}	Kei Nishikori	Japan	193	1
35	49	Alexei Popyrin	Australia	961	1
^{bc}	50	Flavio Cobolli	Italy	955	–
36	51	Pavel Kotov	Individual Neutral Athletes	944	3
37	52	Sebastian Ofner	Austria	933	1
^{a}	53	Miomir Kecmanović	Serbia	920	–
38	54	Marcos Giron	United States	910	4
39	55	Márton Fucsovics	Hungary	887	2
40	56	Corentin Moutet	France	875	4
41	57	Dušan Lajović	Serbia	871	2
^{c}	58	Lorenzo Sonego	Italy	861	–
42	59	Alexander Shevchenko	Kazakhstan	860	2
43	60	Jaume Munar	Spain	850	4
^{bc}	61	Alex Michelsen	United States	832	–
44	62	Dan Evans	Great Britain	828	2
^{c}	63	Facundo Díaz Acosta	Argentina	828	–
^{c}	64	Roberto Carballés Baena	Spain	821	–
45	65	Dominik Koepfer	Germany	801	3
^{bc}	66	Giovanni Mpetshi Perricard	France	786	–
^{a}	67	Christopher O'Connell	Australia	778	–
^{c}	68	Arthur Rinderknech	France	777	–
^{c}	69	Federico Coria	Argentina	761	–
46	70	Thiago Seyboth Wild	Brazil	750	1
^{c}	71	Brandon Nakashima	United States	750	–
^{a}	72	Emil Ruusuvuori	Finland	748	–
^{bc}	73	Luca Nardi	Italy	742	–
^{c}	74	Mackenzie McDonald	United States	735	–
^{bc}	75	Arthur Cazaux	France	735	–
Am1	76	Thiago Monteiro (Note: Quota is passed from 2023 Pan American Games gold medalist Facundo Díaz Acosta to the bronze medalist at the Pan American Games as four athletes from Argentina had already directly qualified.)	Brazil	715	2
47	77	Sumit Nagal	India	713	1
^{c}	78	Alexandre Müller	France	710	–
48	79	Jakub Menšík	Czech Republic	708	2
49^{e}	80	Rinky Hijikata	Australia	708	2
50	81	Zizou Bergs	Belgium	688	1
^{bc}	82	Hugo Gaston	France	683	–
^{c}	83	Aleksandar Kovacevic	United States	680	–
51	84	Taro Daniel	Japan	680	2
^{c}	85	Roberto Bautista Agut	Spain	680	–
52	86	Maximilian Marterer	Germany	679	4
Other entries (Note: The following entries were added to the entry list as late replacements instead of original entrants who had withdrawn.)
53 (Note: Vavassori entered as a last-minute alternate due to Sinner’s withdrawal)	202	Andrea Vavassori	Italy	301	4
54 (Note: Habib entered as a last-minute alternate due to Hurkacz’s withdrawal)	259	Hady Habib	Lebanon	219	2
55 (Note: Ebden entered as a last-minute alternate due to Rune’s withdrawal)	NR	Matthew Ebden	Australia	0	3
56 (Note: Haase entered as a last-minute alternate due to Murray’s withdrawal)	NR	Robin Haase	Netherlands	0	2
57 (Note: Cabral entered as a last-minute alternate due to De Minaur’s withdrawal)	NR	Francisco Cabral	Portugal	0	2
58 (Note: Tsitsipas entered as a last-minute alternate due to Norrie’s withdrawal)	NR	Petros Tsitsipas	Greece	0	2
Continental places
As1	44	Zhang Zhizhen	China	See World Ranking above	
Am1	76	Thiago Monteiro	Brazil	See World Ranking above	
Am2	156	Tomás Barrios Vera	Chile	389	3
Af1	335	Moez Echargui	Tunisia	155	1
Legacy gold medalist / Grand Slam champion
L1	93	Stan Wawrinka	Switzerland	633	1
L2	–	Reallocated to other entries		–	–
Host nation
H1	–	Reallocated to direct entry	France	–	–
Universality
U1	146	Benjamin Hassan	Lebanon	415	1

=== Women's singles ===
No.	Rank	Player	NOC	WTA Points	NOC Rank
World ranking
1	1	Iga Świątek	Poland	11,695	1
2	2	Coco Gauff	United States	7,988	1
^{a}	3	Aryna Sabalenka	Individual Neutral Athletes	7,788	–
^{a}	4	Elena Rybakina	Kazakhstan	5,973	–
3	5	Jessica Pegula	United States	4,625	2
^{a}	6	Markéta Vondroušová	Czech Republic	4,503	–
4	7	Jasmine Paolini	Italy	4,068	1
As1	8	Zheng Qinwen	China	4,005	1
5	9	Maria Sakkari	Greece	3,980	1
^{a}	10	Ons Jabeur	Tunisia	3,748	–
6	11	Danielle Collins	United States	3,532	3
^{a}	12	Madison Keys	United States	3,343	–
7	13	Jeļena Ostapenko	Latvia	3,318	1
^{a}	14	Daria Kasatkina	Individual Neutral Athletes	3,088	–
^{a}	15	Liudmila Samsonova	Individual Neutral Athletes	2,640	–
8	16	Ekaterina Alexandrova	Individual Neutral Athletes	2,360	1
9	17	Marta Kostyuk	Ukraine	2,240	1
10	18	Emma Navarro	United States	2,238	4
^{a}	19	Victoria Azarenka	Individual Neutral Athletes	2,234	–
11	20	Beatriz Haddad Maia	Brazil	2,213	1
12	21	Elina Svitolina	Ukraine	2,100	2
13	22	Caroline Garcia	France	2,068	1
14	23	Mirra Andreeva	Individual Neutral Athletes	2,017	2
^{a}	24	Anna Kalinskaya	Individual Neutral Athletes	1,986	–
15	25	Barbora Krejčíková	Czech Republic	1,768	1
^{a}	26	Anastasia Pavlyuchenkova	Individual Neutral Athletes	1,756	–
16	27	Dayana Yastremska	Ukraine	1,712	3
17	28	Linda Nosková	Czech Republic	1,710	2
^{a}	29	Sorana Cîrstea	Romania	1,704	–
18	30	Katie Boulter	Great Britain	1,671	1
19	31	Kateřina Siniaková	Czech Republic	1,645	3
20	31^{PR(223)}	Angelique Kerber	Germany	332	1
^{ab}	32	Elise Mertens	Belgium	1,629	–
21	33	Leylah Fernandez	Canada	1,625	1
22	33^{PR(189)}	Ajla Tomljanović	Australia	393	1
^{a}	34	Veronika Kudermetova	Individual Neutral Athletes	1,623	–
23	35	Karolína Muchová	Czech Republic	1,510	4
^{a}	36	Anastasia Potapova	Individual Neutral Athletes	1,427	–
^{c}	37	Marie Bouzková	Czech Republic	1,425	–
24	38	Yuan Yue	China	1,422	2
25	39	Donna Vekić	Croatia	1,418	1
26	40	Wang Xinyu	China	1,411	3
^{a}	41	Yulia Putintseva	Kazakhstan	1,333	–
27	42	Clara Burel	France	1,288	2
28	43	Elisabetta Cocciaretto	Italy	1,259	2
29	44	Magda Linette	Poland	1,236	2
^{c}	45	Sofia Kenin	United States	1,222	–
^{a}	46	Anhelina Kalinina	Ukraine	1,221	–
^{c}	47	Sloane Stephens	United States	1,217	–
30	48	Diana Shnaider	Individual Neutral Athletes	1,176	3
31	49	Ana Bogdan	Romania	1,149	1
32	49^{PR(131)}	Irina-Camelia Begu	Romania	581	2
^{c}	50	Karolína Plíšková	Czech Republic	1,147	–
33	51	Wang Xiyu	China	1,125	4
34	52	Magdalena Fręch	Poland	1,106	3
^{c}	53	Zhu Lin	China	1,077	–
^{c}	54	Petra Kvitová	Czech Republic	1,070	–
35	55	Sara Sorribes Tormo	Spain	1,069	1
36	56	Tatjana Maria	Germany	1,059	2
37	57	Arantxa Rus	Netherlands	1,054	1
^{c}	58	Caroline Dolehide	United States	1,049	–
^{bc}	59	Lesia Tsurenko	Ukraine	1,048	–
^{a}	60	Anna Blinkova	Individual Neutral Athletes	1,036	–
^{c}	61	Peyton Stearns	United States	1,035	–
38	62	Nadia Podoroska	Argentina	1,035	1
Af1	63	Mayar Sherif (Note: Quota is passed from gold medalist Angella Okutoyi to the next best placed eligible Africa Games competitor since Okutoyi did not meet the ITF minimum ranking requirement (top 400 or higher).)	Egypt	1,034	1
39	64	Diane Parry	France	999	3
40	64^{PR(228)}	Bianca Andreescu	Canada	323	2
41	65	Clara Tauson	Denmark	994	1
42	66	Jaqueline Cristian	Romania	986	3
43	67	Cristina Bucșa	Spain	984	2
44	68	Lucia Bronzetti	Italy	983	3
45	69	Viktoriya Tomova	Bulgaria	974	1
^{bc}	70	Ashlyn Krueger	United States	974	–
46	71	Varvara Gracheva	France	970	4
^{c}	72	Wang Yafan	China	962	–
47	73	Viktorija Golubic	Switzerland	952	1
48	73^{PR(314)}	Julia Grabher	Austria	216	1
49^{e}	74	Tamara Korpatsch	Germany	951	3
50	75	Laura Siegemund	Germany	941	4
51	76	Moyuka Uchijima	Japan	935	1
^{bc}	77	Katie Volynets	United States	927	–
^{a}	78	Elina Avanesyan	Individual Neutral Athletes	926	–
52	79	Petra Martić	Croatia	911	2
53	80	Anna Karolína Schmiedlová	Slovakia	880	1
54	81	Camila Osorio	Colombia	875	1
Other entries
55 (Note: Errani entered as a last-minute alternate due to Rybakina's withdrawal)	88	Sara Errani	Italy	805	4
56 (Note: Sun entered as a last-minute alternate due to Putintseva's withdrawal)	126	Lulu Sun	New Zealand	611	1
57 (Note: Gadecki entered as a last-minute alternate due to Kalinina's withdrawal)	170	Olivia Gadecki	Australia	444	2
Continental places
As1	8	Zheng Qinwen	China	See World Ranking above	
Af1	63	Mayar Sherif	Egypt	See World Ranking above	
Am1	115	Laura Pigossi	Brazil	672	2
Am2	86	María Lourdes Carlé	Argentina	811	2
Legacy gold medalist / Grand Slam champion
L1	125	Naomi Osaka	Japan	614	1
L2	117	Caroline Wozniacki	Denmark	665	2
Host nation
H1	–	Reallocated to direct entry	France	–	–
Universality
U1	612	Danka Kovinić	Montenegro	71	1

=== Men's doubles ===
No.	CR^{*}	Player A			Player B			NOC
No.	CR^{*}	SR^{†}	DR^{‡}	Name	SR^{†}	DR^{‡}	Name	NOC
World ranking
1	46	–	1	Matthew Ebden	–	45	John Peers	Australia
2	20	–	2	Marcel Granollers	18^{PR(876)}	–	Pablo Carreño Busta	Spain
^{a}	–	–	3	Horacio Zeballos	–	–		Argentina
3	71	–	4	Rohan Bopanna	–	67	Sriram Balaji	India
4	17	–	5	Joe Salisbury	–	12	Neal Skupski	Great Britain
5	21	–	6	Rajeev Ram	–	15	Austin Krajicek	United States
^{a} (Note: Unable to enter because there is no other Salvadoran player within the top of the 300 of the rankings in either singles or doubles.)	–	–	7	Marcelo Arévalo	–	–		El Salvador
6	31	–	8	Wesley Koolhof	23	61	Tallon Griekspoor	Netherlands
7	30	–	9	Mate Pavić	–	21	Nikola Mektić	Croatia
8	21	202	10	Andrea Vavassori	–	11	Simone Bolelli	Italy
Combined ranking
9^{e}	11	2	–	Carlos Alcaraz	9^{PR(264)}	–	Rafael Nadal	Spain
10	25	12	164	Taylor Fritz	13	–	Tommy Paul	United States
11	34	–	17	Kevin Krawietz	–	17	Tim Pütz	Germany
12	39	–	19	Andrés Molteni	–	20	Máximo González	Argentina
13	44	20	576	Nicolás Jarry	24	260	Alejandro Tabilo	Chile
14	48	5	–	Daniil Medvedev	43	233	Roman Safiullin	Individual Neutral Athletes
15	50	–	14	Édouard Roger-Vasselin	36	–	Gael Monfils (Note: Replaced Fabien Reboul)	France
16	51	18	580	Félix Auger-Aliassime	33^{PR(197)}	–	Milos Raonic	Canada
17	54	16	1258	Ugo Humbert	38	568	Arthur Fils	France
18	58	9	294	Alex de Minaur	49	879	Alexei Popyrin	Australia
19	58	–	29	Sander Gillé	–	29	Joran Vliegen	Belgium
20	60	17	143	Alexander Bublik	–	43	Aleksandr Nedovyesov	Kazakhstan
21	60	29	1264	Mariano Navone (Note: Replaced Francisco Cerúndolo)	31	297	Tomás Martín Etcheverry	Argentina
22	69	33	56	Tomáš Macháč	–	36	Adam Pavlásek	Czech Republic
23	71	30	147	Lorenzo Musetti	41	–	Luciano Darderi	Italy
24	80	–	25	Jean-Julien Rojer	–	55	Robin Haase	Netherlands
25	83	11	88	Stefanos Tsitsipas	–	72	Petros Tsitsipas	Greece
26	97	42	572	Fábián Marozsán	55	572	Márton Fucsovics	Hungary
27	100	35	102	Jan-Lennard Struff	65	94	Dominik Koepfer	Germany
28	114	48	364	Nuno Borges	–	66	Francisco Cabral	Portugal
29	146	70	431	Thiago Seyboth Wild	76	–	Thiago Monteiro	Brazil
30	159	62	293	Dan Evans	97	351	Andy Murray	Great Britain
31	405	146	483	Benjamin Hassan	259	529	Hady Habib	Lebanon
Other entries
32 (Note: Daniel and Nishikori entered as a last-minute alternates due to Hurkacz and Zieliński's withdrawals)	132	84	–	Taro Daniel	48^{PR(286)}	–	Kei Nishikori	Japan
Host nation
H1	–	–	–	Reallocated to direct entry	–	–	Reallocated to direct entry	France

^* Combined ranking. The best ranking (singles or doubles) of player A is added to that of player B to calculate the combined ranking.

^† Singles ranking

^‡ Doubles ranking

=== Women's doubles ===
No.	CR^{*}	Player A			Player B			NOC
No.	CR^{*}	SR^{†}	DR^{‡}	Name	SR^{†}	DR^{‡}	Name	NOC
World ranking
^{ab}	–	32	1	Elise Mertens	–	–		Belgium
1	155	675	2	Hsieh Su-wei	519	153	Tsao Chia-yi	Chinese Taipei
2	129	–	3	Erin Routliffe	126	224	Lulu Sun	New Zealand
^{a}	–	137	4	Storm Hunter	–	–		Australia
3	27	31	5	Kateřina Siniaková	25	22	Barbora Krejčíková	Czech Republic
4	37	75	6	Laura Siegemund	31^{PR(223)}	–	Angelique Kerber	Germany
5	40	–	7	Gabriela Dabrowski	33	64	Leylah Fernandez	Canada
^{a}	–	258	8	Vera Zvonareva	–	–		Individual Neutral Athletes
6	93	753	9	Ellen Perez	84	106	Daria Saville	Australia
^{a}	–	1366	9	Nicole Melichar-Martinez	–	–		United States
Combined ranking
7	7	2	12	Coco Gauff	5	44	Jessica Pegula	United States
8	22	7	14	Jasmine Paolini	88	15	Sara Errani	Italy
9	22	11	–	Danielle Collins	–	11	Desirae Krawczyk	United States
10	33	–	13	Luisa Stefani	20	46	Beatriz Haddad Maia	Brazil
11	40	67	19	Cristina Bucșa	55	21	Sara Sorribes Tormo	Spain
12	44	17	57	Marta Kostyuk	27	215	Dayana Yastremska	Ukraine
13	49	–	25	Shuko Aoyama	274	24	Ena Shibahara	Japan
14	52	–	17	Lyudmyla Kichenok	–	35	Nadiia Kichenok	Ukraine
15	63	35	580	Karolína Muchová	28	89	Linda Nosková	Czech Republic
16	63	1108	28	Chan Hao-ching	–	35^{PR(147)}	Latisha Chan	Chinese Taipei
17	68	38	132	Yuan Yue	671	30^{PR(57)}	Zhang Shuai	China
18	71	16	67	Ekaterina Alexandrova	–	55^{PR(475)}	Elena Vesnina	Individual Neutral Athletes
19	71	23	110	Mirra Andreeva	48	88	Diana Shnaider	Individual Neutral Athletes
20	73	–	16	Demi Schuurs	57	77	Arantxa Rus	Netherlands
21	77	30	476	Katie Boulter	158	47	Heather Watson	Great Britain
22	83	40	43	Wang Xinyu	89^{PR(1329)}	43^{PR(129)}	Zheng Saisai	China
23	83	49^{PR(133)}	326	Irina-Camelia Begu	953	34	Monica Niculescu	Romania
24	86	22	42	Caroline Garcia	64	166	Diane Parry	France
25	109	33^{PR(189)}	494	Ajla Tomljanović	170	76	Olivia Gadecki	Australia
26	109	44	49	Magda Linette	–	65^{PR(698)}	Alicja Rosolska	Poland
27	111	43	364	Elisabetta Cocciaretto	68	358	Lucia Bronzetti	Italy
28	113	42	991	Clara Burel	71	867	Varvara Gracheva	France
29	115	49	291	Ana Bogdan	66	216	Jaqueline Cristian	Romania
30	117	9	1590	Maria Sakkari	227	108	Despina Papamichail	Greece
31	130	56	319	Tatjana Maria	74^{e}	328	Tamara Korpatsch	Germany
32	148	62	303	Nadia Podoroska	86	195	María Lourdes Carlé	Argentina
Host nation
H1	–	–	–	Reallocated to direct entry	–	–	Reallocated to direct entry	France

^* Combined ranking. The best ranking (singles or doubles) of player A is added to that of player B to calculate the combined ranking.

^† Singles ranking

^‡ Doubles ranking

=== Mixed doubles ===
No.	CR^{*}	Female Player			Male Player			NOC
No.	CR^{*}	SR^{†}	DR^{‡}	Name	SR^{†}	DR^{‡}	Name	NOC
Combined ranking
1	10	753	9	Ellen Perez	–	1	Matthew Ebden	Australia
2	10	75	6	Laura Siegemund	4	84	Alexander Zverev	Germany
3	14	2	12	Coco Gauff	12	164	Taylor Fritz	United States
4	20	9	1590	Maria Sakkari	11	88	Stefanos Tsitsipas	Greece
^{a}	21	4	–	Elena Rybakina	17	143	Alexander Bublik	Kazakhstan
5	23	55	21	Sara Sorribes Tormo	–	2	Marcel Granollers	Spain
6	24	–	16	Demi Schuurs	–	8	Wesley Koolhof	Netherlands
7	25	–	7	Gabriela Dabrowski	18	580	Félix Auger-Aliassime	Canada
8	25	88	15	Sara Errani	202	10	Andrea Vavassori	Italy
9	28	23	110	Mirra Andreeva	5	–	Daniil Medvedev	Individual Neutral Athletes
10	36	22	42	Caroline Garcia	–	14	Édouard Roger-Vasselin	France
11	38	30	5	Kateřina Siniaková	33	56	Tomáš Macháč	Czech Republic
^{a}	48	39	229	Donna Vekić	–	9	Mate Pavić	Croatia
12	52	158	47	Heather Watson	–	5	Joe Salisbury	Great Britain
13	72	274	24	Ena Shibahara	48^{PR(286)}	–	Kei Nishikori	Japan
14	84	40	43	Wang Xinyu (Note: Replaced Zheng Qinwen)	44	50	Zhang Zhizhen	China
Other entries
15 (Note: Podoroska and González entered as a last-minute alternates due to Rybakina and Bublik's withdrawals)	82	62	303	Nadia Podoroska	–	20	Máximo González	Argentina
16 (Note: Stefani and Seyboth Wild entered as a last-minute alternates due to Vekic and Pavic's withdrawals)	83	–	13	Luisa Stefani	70	431	Thiago Seyboth Wild	Brazil
Host nation
H1	–	–	–	Reallocated to direct entry	–	–	Reallocated to direct entry	France

^* Combined ranking. The best ranking (singles or doubles) of player A is added to that of player B to calculate the combined ranking.

^† Singles ranking

^‡ Doubles ranking
