= Tennis at the 2023 Pan American Games – Qualification =

Qualification
- Tennis at the 2023 Pan American Games

Events
Singles	men	women
Doubles	men	women	mixed
Qualification
- Pan American Games

The following is the qualification system and qualified countries for the Tennis at the 2023 Pan American Games competition.

== Qualification system ==
A total of 82 tennis players will qualify to compete at the Games (41 men and 41 women). Each country is allowed to enter a maximum of three male and three female athletes (with one pair maximum in each of the doubles events). The singles events will consist of 41 men and 41 women respectively, with those athletes competing in the doubles events. The host nation Chile was allowed to enter with a maximum team of 6 athletes, while the remaining spots were distributed using two regional Games and the ATP rankings, WTA rankings and ITF rankings. A further three wildcards for men and women will be also awarded.

== Qualification timeline ==
Event	Date	Venue
2021 Junior Pan American Games	November 29 – December 4	(Colombia) Cali
2022 South American Games	October 1–15	(Paraguay) Asunción
2023 Central American and Caribbean Games	June 23 – July 8	(El Salvador) San Salvador
ATP or WTA Ranking	September 11, 2023	—N/a

== Qualification summary ==
Nation	Men		Women		Mixed	Total
Nation	Singles	Doubles	Singles	Doubles	Doubles	Athletes
Antigua and Barbuda	1					1
Argentina	2	X	4	X	X	6
Bahamas	2		1		X	3
Barbados	1					1
Bolivia	1		1		X	2
Brazil	2	X	2	X	2 (Note: Both players on the mixed doubles pair (Luisa Stefani and Marcelo Demoliner) played only in doubles events.)	6
Canada	1		1		X	2
Chile (Host)	3	X	2	X (1) (Note: Alexa Guarachi played only in doubles events.)	X	6
Colombia	2	X (1) (Note: Nicolás Barrientos played only in doubles events.)	3	X	X	6
Costa Rica	2	X				2
Cuba			1			1
Dominican Republic	3	X	2	X	X	5
Independent Athletes Team			2	X		2
Ecuador			3	X		3
El Salvador			2	X		2
Haiti			1			1
Honduras	1		2	X	X	3
Jamaica	3	X				3
Mexico	2	X				2
Paraguay	3	X	1		X	4
Peru	2	X	3	X	X	5
Saint Kitts and Nevis			1			1
Trinidad and Tobago			1			1
Uruguay			2	X		2
United States	3	X	1		X	4
Venezuela	3	X	1		X	4
Total: 26 NOCs	37	12	37	11	13	78

=== Men's singles ===
Event	Vacancies	Qualifiers
Hosts	3	Tomás Barrios (CHI); Alejandro Tabilo (CHI); Gonzalo Lama (CHI)
2021 Junior Pan American Games	1	Gonzalo Bueno (PER)
2022 South American Games	2	Facundo Díaz Acosta (ARG); Gustavo Heide (BRA)
2023 Central American and Caribbean Games	2	Nick Hardt (DOM); Roberto Cid (DOM)
ATP or ITF ranking	26	Thiago Monteiro (BRA); Facundo Bagnis (ARG); Tristan Boyer (USA); Nicolás Mejía (COL); Omni Kumar (USA); Ernesto Escobedo (MEX); Evan Zhu (USA); Blaise Bicknell (JAM); Daniel Vallejo (PAR); Darian King (BAR); Adrià Soriano Barrera (COL); Justin Boulais (CAN); Conner Huertas del Pino (PER); Peter Bertran (DOM); Justin Roberts (BAH); Alan Rubio (MEX); Jesse Flores (CRC); Federico Zeballos (BOL); Ricardo Rodríguez (VEN); Jody Maginley (ANT); Hernando Escurra (PAR); Brandon Pérez (VEN); John Chin (JAM); Rowland Phillips (JAM); Kevin Major (BAH); Ignacio Martínez (VEN)
Wildcards	3	Rodrigo Crespo (CRC); Alejandro Obando (HON); Martín Vergara (PAR)
Total	37	

=== Men's doubles ===
Event	Vacancies	Qualifiers
Host	1	Chile
World ranking	11	Brazil; Colombia; Peru; Dominican Republic; Venezuela; United States; Costa Rica; Jamaica; Argentina; Paraguay; Mexico
Total	12	

=== Women's singles ===
Event	Vacancies	Qualifiers
Hosts	~~3~~ 2 (Note: The third chilean female player, Alexa Guarachi, only played in the doubles events.)	Daniela Seguel (CHI); Fernanda Labraña (CHI)
2021 Junior Pan American Games	1	Luciana Moyano (ARG)
2022 South American Games	~~2~~ 1	María Herazo González (COL); ~~Verónica Cepede (PAR)~~ (Note: Retired after 2022 South American Games.)
2023 Central American and Caribbean Games	~~2~~ 1	~~María Herazo González (COL)~~ (Note: Already qualified via 2022 South American Games.); Yuliana Lizarazo (COL)
WTA or ITF ranking	29	Laura Pigossi (BRA); Rebecca Marino (CAN); María Carlé (ARG); Julia Riera (ARG); Martina Capurro Taborda (ARG); Carolina Meligeni Alves (BRA); Jamie Loeb (USA); Noelia Zeballos (BOL); Romina Ccuno (PER); Anastasia Iamachkine (PER); Mell Reasco (ECU); Camila Romero (ECU); Lucciana Pérez Alarcón (PER); María Paulina Pérez (COL); Kelly Williford (DOM); Juliana Rodriguez (URU); Leyla Britez (PAR); Sydney-Nicole Clarke (BAH); Roxana Valdés (CUB); Ana Zamburek (DOM); Isabel Andrade (ECU); Daniela Aguilar (ESA); Valentina Cruz (ESA); Natalie Espinal (HON); Daniela Obando (HON); Taly Licht (URU); Vanesa Suarez (VEN); Andrea Weedon (EAI); Deborah Dominguez (EAI)
Wildcards	3	Love-Star Alexis (HAI); Arina Valitova (SKN); Yolande Leacock (TTO)
Total	37	

=== Women's doubles ===
Event	Vacancies	Qualifiers
Host	1	Chile
World ranking	10	Brazil; Colombia; Argentina; Peru; Ecuador; Dominican Republic; Uruguay; Independent Athletes Team; El Salvador; Honduras
Total	11	

=== Mixed doubles ===
Event	Vacancies	Qualifiers
Host	1	Chile
World ranking	12	Brazil; Colombia; Bolivia; Peru; Argentina; Dominican Republic; Canada; United States; Venezuela; Bahamas; Honduras; Paraguay
Total	13	
