= Tennis at the 2023 Pan American Games – Men's doubles =

Tennis – Men's doubles at the 2023 Pan American Games
- Venue: Tennis and Racket Sports Training Centre
- Dates: October 24 – 28, 2023
- Competitors: 24 from 12 nations
- Teams: 12
- Gold medal match score: 6–1, 2–6, [10–7]

Medalists
Gold medal	Gustavo Heide; Marcelo Demoliner	Brazil
Silver medal	Tomás Barrios; Alejandro Tabilo	Chile
Bronze medal	Nick Hardt; Roberto Cid	Dominican Republic

Men's doubles
- Tennis at the 2023 Pan American Games

Events
Singles	men	women
Doubles	men	women	mixed
Qualification
← 2019 ·	Pan American Games	· 2027 →

The men's doubles tennis event of the 2023 Pan American Games was held from October 24 to 28 at the Tennis and Racket Sports Training Centre in Santiago, Chile.

Brazil's Gustavo Heide and Marcelo Demoliner won the gold medal, defeating Chile's Tomás Barrios and Alejandro Tabilo in the final, 6–1, 2–6, [10–7].

Nick Hardt and Roberto Cid from the Dominican Republic won the bronze medal, defeating Jesse Flores and Rodrigo Crespo from Costa Rica in the bronze-medal match, 7–6, 4–6, [12–10].

== Qualification ==
Each National Olympic Committee (NOC) can enter up to one pair (two players) for the men's doubles tournament. The maximum quota of male players, in both singles and doubles, for each country may not exceed three. There are 16 pairs places (32 players) in the event.

The definitive entry list was published on 21 October 2023 and 12 pairs entered the tournament. The seeding was defined by the combined doubles ranking of pairs. The top 4 seed pairs received a Bye in the first round and advanced directly to the Quarterfinals. The remaining eight pairs started in the round of 16.

== Seeds ==
1. Gustavo Heide / Marcelo Demoliner (BRA) (champions, gold medalists)
2. Nicolás Mejía / Nicolás Barrientos (COL) (quarterfinals)
3. Gonzalo Bueno / Conner Huertas del Pino (PER) (quarterfinals)
4. Nick Hardt / Roberto Cid (DOM) (semifinals, bronze medalists)

== Draw ==
=== Key ===
- Q = Qualifier
- WC = Wild card
- LL = Lucky loser
- Alt = Alternate
- ITF = ITF entry
- PR = Protected ranking
- SR = Special ranking
- SE = Special exempt
- JE = Junior exempt
- JR = Junior Accelerator Programme entrant
- CO = College Accelerator Programme entrant
- NG = Next Gen Accelerator Program entrant
- w/o = Walkover
- r = Retired
- d = Defaulted

=== Draw ===
First round
B Bicknell (JAM); R Phillips (JAM)	6	6
E Zhu (USA); O Kumar (USA)	4	3
D Vallejo (PAR); M Vergara (PAR)	6	5	[10]
F Bagnis (ARG); F Díaz Acosta (ARG)	4	7	[3]
B Pérez (VEN); R Rodríguez (VEN)	3	7	[3]
J Flores (CRC); R Crespo (CRC)	6	5	[10]
A Rubio (MEX); E Escobedo (MEX)	3	2
T Barrios (CHI); A Tabilo (CHI)	6	6

Quarterfinals
1	G Heide (BRA); M Demoliner (BRA)	6	6
B Bicknell (JAM); R Phillips (JAM)	2	3
D Vallejo (PAR); M Vergara (PAR)	7	4	[8]
4	N Hardt (DOM); R Cid (DOM)	5	6	[10]
3	G Bueno (PER); C Huertas del Pino (PER)	6^{13}	2
J Flores (CRC); R Crespo (CRC)	7^{15}	6
T Barrios (CHI); A Tabilo (CHI)	7^{7}	6
2	N Mejía (COL); N Barrientos (COL)	6^{1}	0

Semifinals
1	G Heide (BRA); M Demoliner (BRA)	7^{7}	6
4	N Hardt (DOM); R Cid (DOM)	6^{4}	3
J Flores (CRC); R Crespo (CRC)	1	3
T Barrios (CHI); A Tabilo (CHI)	6	6

Final (gold-medal match)
1	G Heide (BRA); M Demoliner (BRA)	6	2	[10]
T Barrios (CHI); A Tabilo (CHI)	1	6	[7]
Bronze-medal match
4	N Hardt (DOM); R Cid (DOM)	7^{7}	4	[12]
J Flores (CRC); R Crespo (CRC)	6^{4}	6	[10]
