= Tennis at the 2023 Pan American Games – Mixed doubles =

Tennis – Mixed doubles at the 2023 Pan American Games
- Venues: Tennis and Racket Sports Training Centre
- Dates: October 25 – 28, 2023
- Competitors: 26 from 13 nations
- Teams: 13
- Gold medal match score: 6–3, 6–4

Medalists
Gold medal	Yuliana Lizarazo; Nicolás Barrientos	Colombia
Silver medal	Luisa Stefani; Marcelo Demoliner	Brazil
Bronze medal	Martina Capurro; Facundo Díaz Acosta	Argentina

Mixed doubles
- Tennis at the 2023 Pan American Games

Events
Singles	men	women
Doubles	men	women	mixed
Qualification
- Pan American Games

The mixed doubles tennis event of the 2023 Pan American Games was held from October 25 to 28 at the Tennis and Racket Sports Training Centre in Santiago, Chile.

Yuliana Lizarazo and Nicolás Barrientos from Colombia won the gold medal, defeating Brazil's Luisa Stefani and Marcelo Demoliner in the final, 6–3, 6–4.

Argentina's Martina Capurro and Facundo Díaz Acosta won the bronze medal, defeating Romina Ccuno and Conner Huertas del Pino from Peru in the bronze-medal match, 6–1, 6–4.

== Qualification ==
Each National Olympic Committee (NOC) can enter up to one pair (two players) for the mixed doubles tournament. There are 16 pairs places (32 players) in the event. Mixed doubles teams will be selected from athletes who have been accepted for the singles and/or doubles events.

The definitive entry list was published on 21 October 2023 and 13 pairs entered the tournament. The seeding was defined by the combined doubles ranking of pairs. The top 3 seed pairs received a Bye in the first round and advanced directly to the Quarterfinals. The remaining ten pairs started in the round of 16.

== Seeds ==
1. Luisa Stefani / Marcelo Demoliner (BRA) (final, silver medalists)
2. Yuliana Lizarazo / Nicolás Barrientos (COL) (champions, gold medalists)
3. Noelia Zeballos / Federico Zeballos (BOL) (quarterfinals)
4. Romina Ccuno / Conner Huertas del Pino (PER) (semifinals)

== Draw ==
Key

- Q = Qualifier
- WC = Wild card
- LL = Lucky loser
- Alt = Alternate
- ITF = ITF entry
- PR = Protected ranking
- SR = Special ranking
- SE = Special exempt
- JE = Junior exempt
- JR = Junior Accelerator Programme entrant
- CO = College Accelerator Programme entrant
- NG = Next Gen Accelerator Program entrant
- w/o = Walkover
- r = Retired
- d = Defaulted

=== Draw ===
First round
R Marino (CAN); J Boulais (CAN)	6	6
N Espinal (HON); A Obando (HON)	4	2
M Capurro (ARG); F Díaz Acosta (ARG)	6	6^{11}	[11]
A Guarachi (CHI); G Lama (CHI)	3	7^{13}	[9]
J Loeb (USA); T Boyer (USA)	6	6
V Suarez (VEN); B Pérez (VEN)	4	4
K Williford (DOM); P Bertran (DOM)	0	2
4	R Ccuno (PER); C Huertas del Pino (PER)	6	6
S Clarke (BAH); J Roberts (BAH)	4	2
L Britez (PAR); M Vergara (PAR)	6	6

Quarterfinals
1	L Stefani (BRA); M Demoliner (BRA)	6	3	[10]
R Marino (CAN); J Boulais (CAN)	4	6	[7]
M Capurro (ARG); F Díaz Acosta (ARG)	7^{7}	6
3	N Zeballos (BOL); F Zeballos (BOL)	6^{2}	4
J Loeb (USA); T Boyer (USA)	4	6	[6]
4	R Ccuno (PER); C Huertas del Pino (PER)	6	3	[10]
L Britez (PAR); M Vergara (PAR)	3	6	[4]
2	Y Lizarazo (COL); N Barrientos (COL)	6	4	[10]

Semifinals
1	L Stefani (BRA); M Demoliner (BRA)	6	6
M Capurro (ARG); F Díaz Acosta (ARG)	2	4
4	R Ccuno (PER); C Huertas del Pino (PER)	3	6^{4}
2	Y Lizarazo (COL); N Barrientos (COL)	6	7^{7}

Final (gold-medal match)
1	L Stefani (BRA); M Demoliner (BRA)	3	4
2	Y Lizarazo (COL); N Barrientos (COL)	6	6
Bronze-medal match
M Capurro (ARG); F Díaz Acosta (ARG)	6	6
4	R Ccuno (PER); C Huertas del Pino (PER)	1	4
