= Tennis at the 2023 Pan American Games – Women's doubles =

Tennis – Women's doubles at the 2023 Pan American Games
- Venue: Tennis and Racket Sports Training Centre
- Dates: October 24 – 28, 2023
- Competitors: 22 from 11 nations
- Teams: 11
- Gold medal match score: 7–5, 6–3

Medalists
Gold medal	Laura Pigossi; Luisa Stefani	Brazil
Silver medal	María Herazo González; María Paulina Pérez	Colombia
Bronze medal	María Lourdes Carlé; Julia Riera	Argentina

Women's doubles
- Tennis at the 2023 Pan American Games

Events
Singles	men	women
Doubles	men	women	mixed
Qualification
← 2019 ·	Pan American Games	· 2027 →

The women's doubles tennis event of the 2023 Pan American Games was held from October 24 to 28 at the Tennis and Racket Sports Training Centre in Santiago, Chile.

Brazil's Laura Pigossi and Luisa Stefani won the gold medal, defeating Colombia's María Fernanda Herazo and María Paulina Pérez in the final, 7–5, 6–3.

Argentina's María Lourdes Carlé and Julia Riera won the bronze medal, defeating Chile's Alexa Guarachi and Fernanda Labraña in the bronze-medal match, 6–3, 6–3.

== Qualification ==
Each National Olympic Committee (NOC) can enter up to one pair (two players) for the women's doubles tournament. The maximum quota of female players, in both singles and doubles, for each country may not exceed three. There are 16 pairs places (32 players) in the event.

The definitive entry list was published on 21 October 2023 and 11 pairs entered the tournament. The seeding was defined by the combined doubles ranking of pairs. The top 4 seed pairs and one randomly drawn unseeded pair received a Bye in the first round, and advanced directly to the Quarterfinals. The remaining six pairs started in the round of 16.

== Seeds ==
1. Laura Pigossi / Luisa Stefani (BRA) (champions, gold medalists)
2. María Herazo González / María Paulina Pérez (COL) (final, silver medalists)
3. Alexa Guarachi / Fernanda Labraña (CHI) (semifinals)
4. María Lourdes Carlé / Julia Riera (ARG) (semifinals, bronze medalists)

== Draw ==
=== Key ===
- Q = Qualifier
- WC = Wild card
- LL = Lucky loser
- Alt = Alternate
- ITF = ITF entry
- PR = Protected ranking
- SR = Special ranking
- SE = Special exempt
- JE = Junior exempt
- JR = Junior Accelerator Programme entrant
- CO = College Accelerator Programme entrant
- NG = Next Gen Accelerator Program entrant
- w/o = Walkover
- r = Retired
- d = Defaulted

=== Draw ===
First round
T Licht (URU); J Rodriguez (URU)	3	7^{10}	[12]
D Obando (HON); N Espinal (HON)	6	6^{8}	[10]
D Dominguez (EAI); A Weedon (EAI)	6	6
D Aguilar (ESA); V Cruz (ESA)	4	0
K Williford (DOM); A Zamburek (DOM)	3	4
A Iamachkine (PER); L Pérez (PER)	6	6

Quarterfinals
1	L Pigossi (BRA); L Stefani (BRA)	6	6
M Reasco (ECU); C Romero (ECU)	2	3
T Licht (URU); J Rodriguez (URU)	0	3
3	A Guarachi (CHI); F Labraña (CHI)	6	6
4	ML Carlé (ARG); J Riera (ARG)	7	6
D Dominguez (EAI); A Weedon (EAI)	5	0
A Iamachkine (PER); L Pérez (PER)	5	4
2	MF Herazo (COL); MP Pérez (COL)	7	6

Semifinals
1	L Pigossi (BRA); L Stefani (BRA)	6	6
3	A Guarachi (CHI); F Labraña (CHI)	2	3
4	ML Carlé (ARG); J Riera (ARG)	6^{5}	6	[5]
2	MF Herazo (COL); MP Pérez (COL)	7^{7}	2	[10]

Final (gold-medal match)
1	L Pigossi (BRA); L Stefani (BRA)	7	6
2	MF Herazo (COL); MP Pérez (COL)	5	3
Bronze-medal match
3	A Guarachi (CHI); F Labraña (CHI)	3	3
4	ML Carlé (ARG); J Riera (ARG)	6	6
