= Tennis at the 2023 Pan American Games – Women's singles =

Tennis – Women's singles at the 2023 Pan American Games
- Venue: Tennis and Racket Sports Training Centre
- Dates: October 23 – 29, 2023
- Competitors: 37 from 21 nations
- Gold medal match score: 6–2, 6–3

Medalists
Gold medal	Laura Pigossi	Brazil
Silver medal	María Lourdes Carlé	Argentina
Bronze medal	Julia Riera	Argentina

Women's singles
- Tennis at the 2023 Pan American Games

Events
Singles	men	women
Doubles	men	women	mixed
Qualification
← 2019 ·	Pan American Games	· 2027 →

The women's singles tennis event of the 2023 Pan American Games was held from October 23 to 29 at the Tennis and Racket Sports Training Centre in Santiago, Chile.

Brazil's Laura Pigossi, the 2020 Olympic bronze medalist in doubles, defeated María Lourdes Carlé from Argentina in the final, 6–2, 6–3, to win the gold medal. It was Brazil's first gold medal at the event since Gisele Miró won it in 1987. Both finalists of the tournament booked tickets to the 2024 Summer Olympics.

Argentina's Julia Riera won the bronze medal, defeating Rebecca Marino from Canada in the bronze-medal match, 3–6, 6–4, 6–1.

== Qualification ==
Each National Olympic Committee (NOC) can enter up to three players. Qualification for the event is primarily through the WTA or ITF ranking, and all athletes must fulfill the qualification requirements for the 2024 Olympic Games. There are 41 quota places available for women's singles.

There are four places available through regional qualification: two in the 2022 South American Games, and two in the 2023 Central American and Caribbean Games. There is also one place available through the 2021 Junior Pan American Games. All of these places are for the athletes, not for their NOC.

Three places are guaranteed to the host nation. Chile only entered 2 players for this event, their third female player (Alexa Guarachi) only played in the doubles events.

The definitive entry list was published on 21 October 2023 and 37 athletes entered the event. The seeding was defined by the WTA rankings of the players. The first round was played by 10 athletes, who were drawn randomly among unseeded players. The remaining athletes started in the round of 32.

== Seeds ==
1. Laura Pigossi (BRA) (champion, gold medalist)
2. Rebecca Marino (CAN) (semifinals)
3. María Carlé (ARG) (final, silver medalist)
4. Julia Riera (ARG) (semifinals, bronze medalist)
5. Martina Capurro Taborda (ARG) (third round)
6. Carolina Meligeni Alves (BRA) (quarterfinals)
7. Jamie Loeb (USA) (quarterfinals)
8. María Herazo González (COL) (second round)
9. Noelia Zeballos (BOL) (third round)
10. Romina Ccuno (PER) (third round)
11. Yuliana Lizarazo (COL) (quarterfinals)
12. Daniela Seguel (CHI) (third round)
13. Fernanda Labraña (CHI) (third round)
14. Anastasia Iamachkine (PER) (third round)
15. Mell Reasco (ECU) (third round)
16. Camila Romero (ECU) (second round)

== Draw ==
The results were as follows:

=== Key ===
- Q = Qualifier
- WC = Wild card
- LL = Lucky loser
- Alt = Alternate
- ITF = ITF entry
- PR = Protected ranking
- SR = Special ranking
- SE = Special exempt
- JE = Junior exempt
- JR = Junior Accelerator Programme entrant
- CO = College Accelerator Programme entrant
- NG = Next Gen Accelerator Program entrant
- w/o = Walkover
- r = Retired
- d = Defaulted

=== Finals ===
Quarterfinals
1	Laura Pigossi (BRA)	7	4	6
7	Jamie Loeb (USA)	5	6	1
4	Julia Riera (ARG)	6	6
Vanesa Suarez (VEN)	4	2
6	Carolina Meligeni Alves (BRA)	6^{5}	1
3	María Lourdes Carlé (ARG)	7^{7}	6
11	Yuliana Lizarazo (COL)	5	6	4
2	Rebecca Marino (CAN)	7	4	6

Semifinals
1	Laura Pigossi (BRA)	4	6	7^{7}
4	Julia Riera (ARG)	6	4	6^{5}
3	María Lourdes Carlé (ARG)	6	6
2	Rebecca Marino (CAN)	1	4

Final (gold-medal match)
1	Laura Pigossi (BRA)	6	6
3	María Lourdes Carlé (ARG)	2	3
Bronze-medal match
4	Julia Riera (ARG)	3	6	6
2	Rebecca Marino (CAN)	6	4	1

=== Top half ===
==== Section 1 ====
First round
L Pérez (PER)	6	6
A Valitova (SKN)	0	2
A Zamburek (DOM)	5	4
L Moyano (ARG)	7	6

Second round
1	L Pigossi (BRA)	6	6
V Cruz (ESA)	0	0
L Pérez (PER)	6	6
16	C Romero (ECU)	0	2
12	D Seguel (CHI)	6	6
L Moyano (ARG)	3	4
S Clarke (BAH)	3	0
7	J Loeb (USA)	6	6

Third round
1	L Pigossi (BRA)	2	7	6
L Pérez (PER)	6	5	4
12	D Seguel (CHI)	2	5
7	J Loeb (USA)	6	7

Quarterfinals
1	L Pigossi (BRA)	7	4	6
7	J Loeb (USA)	5	6	1

==== Section 2 ====
First round
A Weedon (EAI)	6	0	2
V Suarez (VEN)	4	6	6

Second round
4	J Riera (ARG)	6	6
N Espinal (HON)	2	1
L Britez (PAR)	6	2	4
15	M Reasco (ECU)	3	6	6
10	R Ccuno (PER)	6	6
J Rodriguez (URU)	0	2
V Suarez (VEN)	6	7^{8}
8	MF Herazo (COL)	4	6^{6}

Third round
4	J Riera (ARG)	6	6
15	M Reasco (ECU)	4	0
10	R Ccuno (PER)	1	3
V Suarez (VEN)	6	6

Quarterfinals
4	J Riera (ARG)	6	6
V Suarez (VEN)	4	2

=== Bottom half ===
==== Section 3 ====
First round
LS Alexis (HAI)	6	2	3
T Licht (URU)	0	6	6

Second round
6	C Meligeni Alves (BRA)	6	6
D Aguilar (ESA)	0	0
MP Pérez (COL)	6	5	5
9	N Zeballos (BOL)	0	7	7
13	F Labraña (CHI)	4	6	6
K Williford (DOM)	6	1	4
T Licht (URU)	0	2
3	ML Carlé (ARG)	6	6

Third round
6	C Meligeni Alves (BRA)	6	6
9	N Zeballos (BOL)	4	2
13	F Labraña (CHI)	2	2
3	ML Carlé (ARG)	6	6

Quarterfinals
6	C Meligeni Alves (BRA)	6^{5}	1
3	ML Carlé (ARG)	7^{7}	6

==== Section 4 ====
First round
D Obando (HON)	6	6
R Valdés (CUB)	0	3

Second round
5	M Capurro (ARG)	6	6
I Andrade (ECU)	1	4
D Obando (HON)	0	1
11	Y Lizarazo (COL)	6	6
14	A Iamachkine (PER)	6	6
Y Leacock (TTO)	0	0
D Dominguez (EAI)	5	2
2	R Marino (CAN)	7	6

Third round
5	M Capurro (ARG)	4	1
11	Y Lizarazo (COL)	6	6
14	A Iamachkine (PER)	4	3
2	R Marino (CAN)	6	6

Quarterfinals
11	Y Lizarazo (COL)	5	6	4
2	R Marino (CAN)	7	4	6
