= Tennis at the 2023 Pan American Games =

- Tennis pictogram
- Venues: Tennis and Racket Sports Training Centre
- Start date: October 23, 2023
- End date: October 29, 2023
- No. of events: 5 (2 men, 2 women, 1 mixed)
- Competitors: 78 from 26 nations

Tennis at the 2023 Pan American Games

Champions

Men's singles
- Facundo Díaz Acosta (ARG)

Women's singles
- Laura Pigossi (BRA)

Men's doubles
- Gustavo Heide & Marcelo Demoliner (BRA)

Women's doubles
- Laura Pigossi & Luisa Stefani (BRA)

Mixed doubles
- Yuliana Lizarazo & Nicolás Barrientos (COL)
- Pan American Games

Tennis competitions at the 2023 Pan American Games in Santiago, Chile were scheduled to be held from October 23 to 29. The competitions took place at the Tennis and Racket Sports Training Centre inside the Estadio Nacional sporting complex, in Ñuñoa.

A total of 82 athletes (41 men and 41 women) were scheduled to compete in five events: singles and doubles for each gender and a mixed doubles event.

The top two in each individual event would qualify for the 2024 Summer Olympics, if ranked in the top 400 in the world by June 10, 2024, and if their country has not passed the maximum quota.

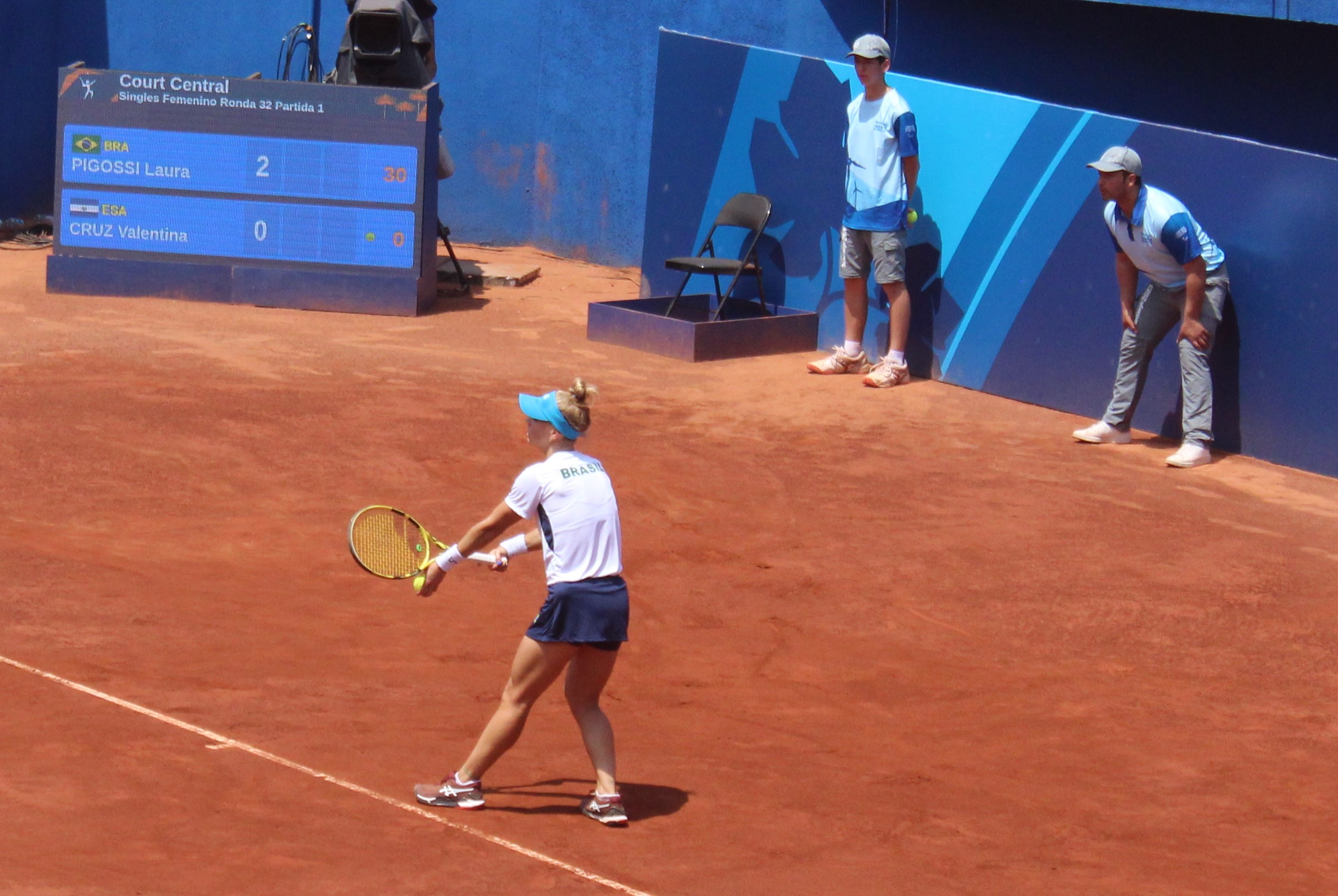
Gold medalist Laura Pigossi from Brazil during her match against Valentina Cruz from El Salvador

Brazil was the most successful nation in this event, taking home five medals, one in each draw, three golds, one silver and one bronze. Of the six Brazilians in the tournament, only Carolina Meligeni Alves did not win any medals and only Thiago Monteiro and Gustavo Heide finished without winning more than one medal.

== Qualification ==
A total of 82 quota places were available to compete at the Games (41 men and 41 women). Each country was allowed to enter a maximum of three male and three female athletes (with one pair maximum in each of the doubles events). The host nation Chile was allowed to enter with a maximum team of 6 athletes, while the remaining spots were distributed using two regional Games and the ATP rankings, WTA rankings and ITF rankings. A further three wildcards for men and women would be also awarded.

== Competition schedule ==
The following is the competition schedule for the tennis competitions:

E	Eliminations	¼	Quarterfinals	½	Semifinals	F	Finals

Event↓/Date →	Mon 23	Tue 24	Wed 25	Thu 26	Fri 27	Sat 28	Sun 29
Men's singles	E	E	E	E	¼	½	F
Men's doubles		E	E	¼	½	F	
Women's singles	E	E	E	E	¼	½	F
Women's doubles		E	E	¼	½	F	
Mixed doubles			E	¼	½	F	

== Participating nations ==
- Antigua and Barbuda (1)
- Argentina (6)
- Bahamas (3)
- Barbados (1)
- Bolivia (2)
- Brazil (6)
- Canada (2)
- Chile (6) (host)
- Colombia (6)
- Costa Rica (2)
- Cuba (1)
- Dominican Republic (5)
- Independent Athletes Team (2)
- Ecuador (3)
- El Salvador (2)
- Haiti (1)
- Honduras (3)
- Jamaica (3)
- Mexico (2)
- Paraguay (4)
- Peru (5)
- Saint Kitts and Nevis (1)
- Trinidad and Tobago (1)
- Uruguay (2)
- United States (4)
- Venezuela (4)

== Medal summary ==
=== Medal table ===
* Host nation (Chile)

Rank	Nation	Gold	Silver	Bronze	Total
1	Brazil	3	1	1	5
2	Argentina	1	1	3	5
3	Colombia	1	1	0	2
4	Chile*	0	2	0	2
5	Dominican Republic	0	0	1	1
Totals (5 entries)		5	5	5	15

=== Medalists ===
Event	Gold	Silver	Bronze
Men's singles	Facundo Díaz Acosta; Argentina	Tomás Barrios Vera; Chile	Thiago Monteiro; Brazil
Men's doubles	Brazil; Gustavo Heide; Marcelo Demoliner	Chile; Tomás Barrios Vera; Alejandro Tabilo	Dominican Republic; Nick Hardt; Roberto Cid Subervi
Women's singles	Laura Pigossi; Brazil	María Lourdes Carlé; Argentina	Julia Riera; Argentina
Women's doubles	Brazil; Laura Pigossi; Luisa Stefani	Colombia; María Herazo González; María Paulina Pérez	Argentina; María Lourdes Carlé; Julia Riera
Mixed doubles	Colombia; Yuliana Lizarazo; Nicolás Barrientos	Brazil; Luisa Stefani; Marcelo Demoliner	Argentina; Martina Capurro; Facundo Díaz Acosta

== See also ==
- Wheelchair tennis at the 2023 Parapan American Games
- Tennis at the 2024 Summer Olympics
