= Tennis at the 2023 Pan American Games – Men's singles =

Tennis – Men's singles at the 2023 Pan American Games
- Venues: Tennis and Racket Sports Training Centre
- Dates: October 23 – 29, 2023
- Competitors: 37 from 18 nations
- Gold medal match score: 6–3, 7–6

Medalists
Gold medal	Facundo Díaz Acosta	Argentina
Silver medal	Tomás Barrios	Chile
Bronze medal	Thiago Monteiro	Brazil

Men's singles
- Tennis at the 2023 Pan American Games

Events
Singles	men	women
Doubles	men	women	mixed
Qualification
- Pan American Games

The men's singles tennis event of the 2023 Pan American Games was held from October 23 to 29 at the Tennis and Racket Sports Training Centre in Santiago, Chile.

Facundo Díaz Acosta from Argentina defeated home athlete Tomás Barrios in the final, 6–4, 7–5, to win his first Pan American gold medal.

Thiago Monteiro from Brazil won the bronze medal, defeating his fellow countryman Gustavo Heide in the bronze-medal match, 1–6, 6–3, 7–6.

== Qualification ==
Each National Olympic Committee (NOC) can enter up to three players. Qualification for the event is primarily through the ATP or ITF ranking, and all athletes must fulfill the qualification requirements for the 2024 Olympic Games. There are 41 quota places available for men's singles.

There are four places available through regional qualification: two in the 2022 South American Games, and two in the 2023 Central American and Caribbean Games. There is also one place available through the 2021 Junior Pan American Games. All of these places are for the athletes, not for their NOC.

Three places are guaranteed to the host nation, Chile.

The definitive entry list was published on 21 October 2023 and 37 athletes entered the event. The seeding was defined by the ATP rankings of the players. The first round was played by 10 athletes, who were drawn randomly among unseeded players. The remaining athletes started in the round of 32.

== Seeds ==
1. Facundo Díaz Acosta (ARG) (champion, gold medalist)
2. Tomás Barrios (CHI) (final, silver medalist)
3. Alejandro Tabilo (CHI) (third round)
4. Thiago Monteiro (BRA) (semifinals, bronze medalist)
5. Facundo Bagnis (ARG) (quarterfinals)
6. Gustavo Heide (BRA) (semifinals)
7. Tristan Boyer (USA) (third round)
8. Nick Hardt (DOM) (quarterfinals)
9. Nicolás Mejía (COL) (third round)
10. Omni Kumar (USA) (second round)
11. Ernesto Escobedo (MEX) (quarterfinals)
12. Evan Zhu (USA) (second round)
13. Gonzalo Bueno (PER) (second round)
14. Gonzalo Lama (CHI) (third round)
15. Blaise Bicknell (JAM) (third round)
16. Daniel Vallejo (PAR) (quarterfinals)

== Draw ==
The results were as follows: Key

- Q = Qualifier
- WC = Wild card
- LL = Lucky loser
- Alt = Alternate
- ITF = ITF entry
- PR = Protected ranking
- SR = Special ranking
- SE = Special exempt
- JE = Junior exempt
- JR = Junior Accelerator Programme entrant
- CO = College Accelerator Programme entrant
- NG = Next Gen Accelerator Program entrant
- w/o = Walkover
- r = Retired
- d = Defaulted

=== Finals ===
Quarterfinals
1	Facundo Díaz Acosta (ARG)	6	6^{5}	6
11	Ernesto Escobedo (MEX)	3	7^{7}	1
16	Daniel Vallejo (PAR)	3	4
6	Gustavo Heide (BRA)	6	6
5	Facundo Bagnis (ARG)	2	4
4	Thiago Monteiro (BRA)	6	6
8	Nick Hardt (DOM)	6	4	4
2	Tomás Barrios (CHI)	2	6	6

Semifinals
1	Facundo Díaz Acosta (ARG)	4	6	7^{8}
6	Gustavo Heide (BRA)	6	4	6^{6}
4	Thiago Monteiro (BRA)	3	1
2	Tomás Barrios (CHI)	6	6

Final (gold-medal match)
1	Facundo Díaz Acosta (ARG)	6	7
2	Tomás Barrios (CHI)	3	6^{5}
Bronze-medal match
6	Gustavo Heide (BRA)	6	3	6^{5}
4	Thiago Monteiro (BRA)	1	6	7

=== Top half ===
==== Section 1 ====
First round
A Soriano (COL)	6	6
A Obando (HON)	1	1
P Bertran (DOM)	6	7^{10}
J Maginley (ANT)	4	6^{8}

Second round
1	F Díaz Acosta (ARG)	6	6
B Pérez (VEN)	2	1
A Soriano (COL)	6	6
13	G Bueno (PER)	3	4
11	E Escobedo (MEX)	6	6
P Bertran (DOM)	1	3
J Chin (JAM)	3	0
7	T Boyer (USA)	6	6

Third round
1	F Díaz Acosta (ARG)	6	6
A Soriano (COL)	2	4
11	E Escobedo (MEX)	3	7^{7}	7^{7}
7	T Boyer (USA)	6	6^{5}	6^{4}

Quarterfinals
1	F Díaz Acosta (ARG)	6	6^{5}	6
11	E Escobedo (MEX)	3	7^{7}	1

==== Section 2 ====
First round
R Cid (DOM)	6	6
R Rodríguez (VEN)	2	0

Second round
3	A Tabilo (CHI)	6	6
J Flores (CRC)	4	3
J Roberts (BAH)	1	3
16	D Vallejo (PAR)	6	6
10	O Kumar (USA)	6	5	4
J Boulais (CAN)	4	7	6
R Cid (DOM)	5	4
6	G Heide (BRA)	7	6

Third round
3	A Tabilo (CHI)	6	6^{6}	5
16	D Vallejo (PAR)	4	7^{8}	7
J Boulais (CAN)	3	3
6	G Heide (BRA)	6	6

Quarterfinals
16	D Vallejo (PAR)	3	4
6	G Heide (BRA)	6	6

=== Bottom half ===
==== Section 3 ====
First round
R Crespo (CRC)	6^{5}	3
C Huertas del Pino (PER)	7^{7}	6

Second round
5	F Bagnis (ARG)	6	6^{4}	7^{7}
F Zeballos (BOL)	2	7^{7}	6^{2}
R Phillips (JAM)	7	4	4
9	N Mejía (COL)	5	6	6
14	G Lama (CHI)	6	6
H Escurra (PAR)	1	1
C Huertas del Pino (PER)	0	4
4	T Monteiro (BRA)	6	6

Third round
5	F Bagnis (ARG)	6	6
9	N Mejía (COL)	3	4
14	G Lama (CHI)	3	4
4	T Monteiro (BRA)	6	6

Quarterfinals
5	F Bagnis (ARG)	2	4
4	T Monteiro (BRA)	6	6

==== Section 4 ====
First round
K Major (BAH)	3	0
A Rubio (MEX)	6	6

Second round
8	N Hardt (DOM)	6	6
I Martínez (VEN)	1	0
A Rubio (MEX)	6	6
12	E Zhu (USA)	4	3
15	B Bicknell (JAM)	3	6	6
M Vergara (PAR)	6	3	2
D King (BAR)	6	3	5
2	T Barrios (CHI)	4	6	7

Third round
8	N Hardt (DOM)	7^{7}	6
A Rubio (MEX)	6^{4}	1
15	B Bicknell (JAM)	3	7^{7}	2
2	T Barrios (CHI)	6	6^{2}	6

Quarterfinals
8	N Hardt (DOM)	6	4	4
2	T Barrios (CHI)	2	6	6
