= Luisa Stefani =

Brazilian tennis player (born 1997)

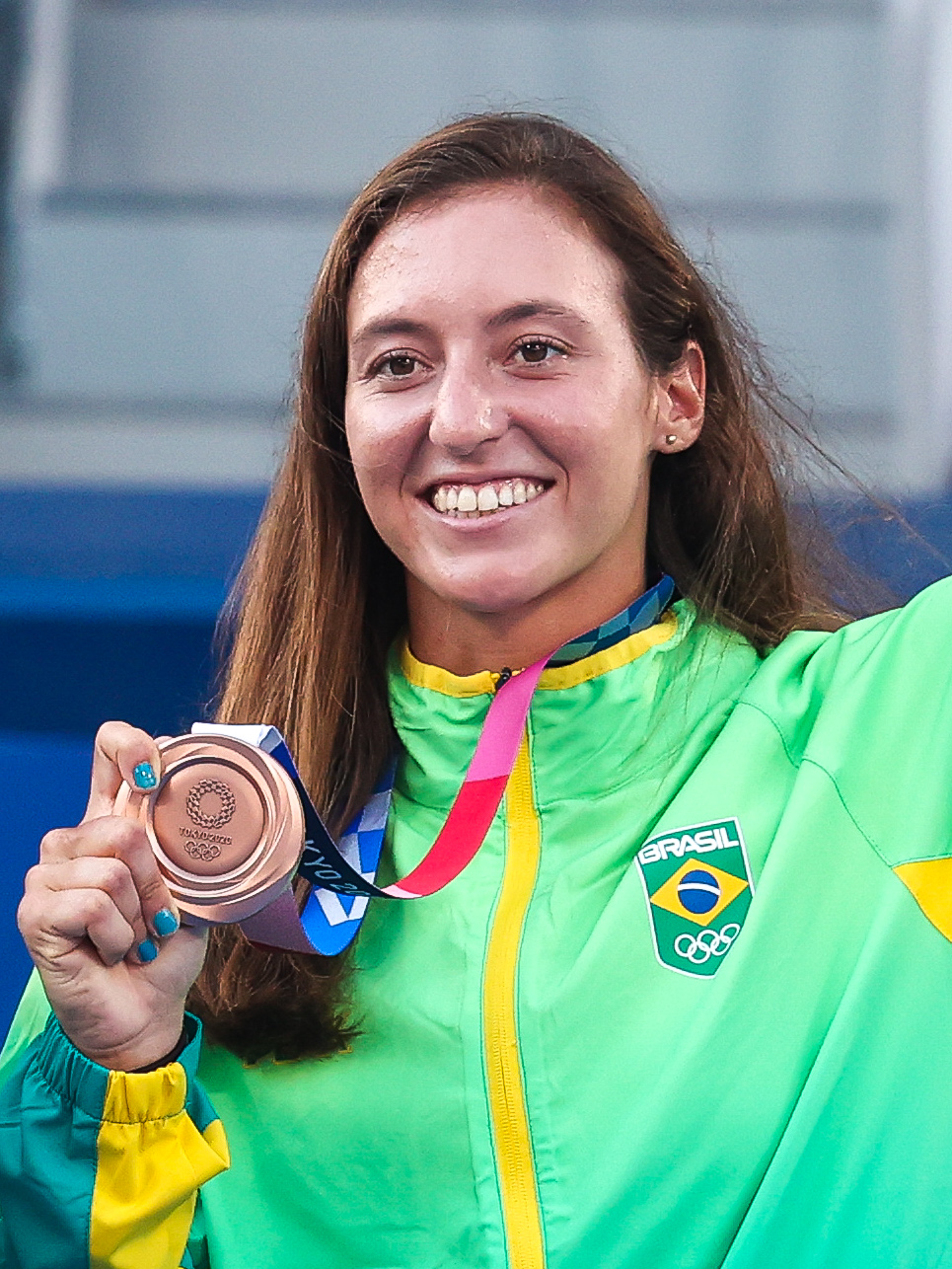
- Stefani at the 2020 Summer Olympics
- Full name: Luisa Veras Stefani
- Country (sports): Brazil
- Residence: São Paulo, Brazil
- Born: 9 August 1997 (age 29) São Paulo, Brazil
- Height: 1.68 m (5 ft 6 in)
- Turned pro: 2015
- Plays: Right (two-handed backhand)
- Coach: Guilherme Pachane
- Prize money: $3,441,333

Singles
- Career record: 85–66
- Career titles: 0
- Highest ranking: No. 431 (20 May 2019)

Doubles
- Career record: 359–147
- Career titles: 19
- Highest ranking: No. 3 (14 September 2026)
- Current ranking: No. 3 (14 September 2026)

Grand Slam doubles results
- Australian Open: SF (2026)
- French Open: SF (2026)
- Wimbledon: F (2026)
- US Open: SF (2021, 2023, 2026)

Other doubles tournaments
- Tour Finals: F (2025)

Grand Slam mixed doubles results
- Australian Open: W (2023)
- French Open: QF (2023)
- Wimbledon: F (2025)
- US Open: 1R (2021, 2023, 2024)

Other mixed doubles tournaments
- Olympic Games: 1R (2021, 2024)

Team competitions
- Fed Cup: 10–2
Medal record
Women's tennis
Representing Brazil
Olympic Games
Bronze medal – third place	2020 Tokyo	Doubles
Pan American Games
Gold medal – first place	2023 Santiago	Doubles
Silver medal – second place	2023 Santiago	Mixed doubles
Bronze medal – third place	2019 Lima	Doubles
- Last updated on: 16 November 2026.

Luisa Veras Stefani (Note: Portuguese: [luˈizɐ ˈvɛɾas steˈfɐni]) (born 9 August 1997) is a professional tennis player from Brazil who specializes in doubles. Her career-high doubles ranking is world No. 3, achieved in September 14 2026.

Stefani is the first Brazilian woman to reach the WTA Top 10, the Top 5, and the top 3 in the Open Era. She is also the first Brazilian woman to have achieved both milestones. She reached world No. 9 in doubles on 1 November 2021 and world No. 4 on 13 July 2026.

On 20 May 2019, she reached a singles ranking of No. 431.

Stefani won the mixed-doubles competition at the 2023 Australian Open with Rafael Matos, becoming the first all Brazilian pair to win a major title. With that, Stefani also became the second Brazilian woman to win any major title—after Maria Bueno—and the first Brazilian woman ever to win a mixed doubles title at the Australian Open. She is also one of two Brazilians to win an Olympic medal for tennis, partnering Laura Pigossi at the 2020 Tokyo Olympics to win bronze in women's doubles.

== Juniors and college years ==
Stefani started playing tennis at age 10, enrolled by her mother who had taken tennis lessons to improve her Frescobol skills. Stefani enjoyed it so much that she wanted to play more and more, until she decided to pursue a professional career in the sport.

At the age of 14, Stefani's family moved to the United States, where it was hoped she would develop herself better in tennis. She started training at Saddlebrook Tennis Academy, and competed in the main draws of all four junior Grand Slams, eventually reaching two junior Grand Slam semifinals in doubles: the 2014 French Open and the 2015 US Open. As she attended Pepperdine University, with a college scholarship, Stefani studied advertising before pausing her academic program. In the Intercollegiate Tennis tour Stefani played for the Pepperdine Waves team, ranked as high as No. 2 in the ITA rankings, and was also named the 2015 ITA National Rookie of the Year, having compiled a 40–6 record in her freshman season and reached the semifinals of the 2016 NCAA Singles Championships, where she lost to eventual champion Danielle Collins.

Stefani attained a career-high ranking of world No. 10 on the ITF Junior Circuit.

== Professional ==
=== 2015 ===
Stefani made her WTA Tour debut at the 2015 Brasil Tennis Cup where she received a wildcard for the singles main draw.

=== 2019 ===
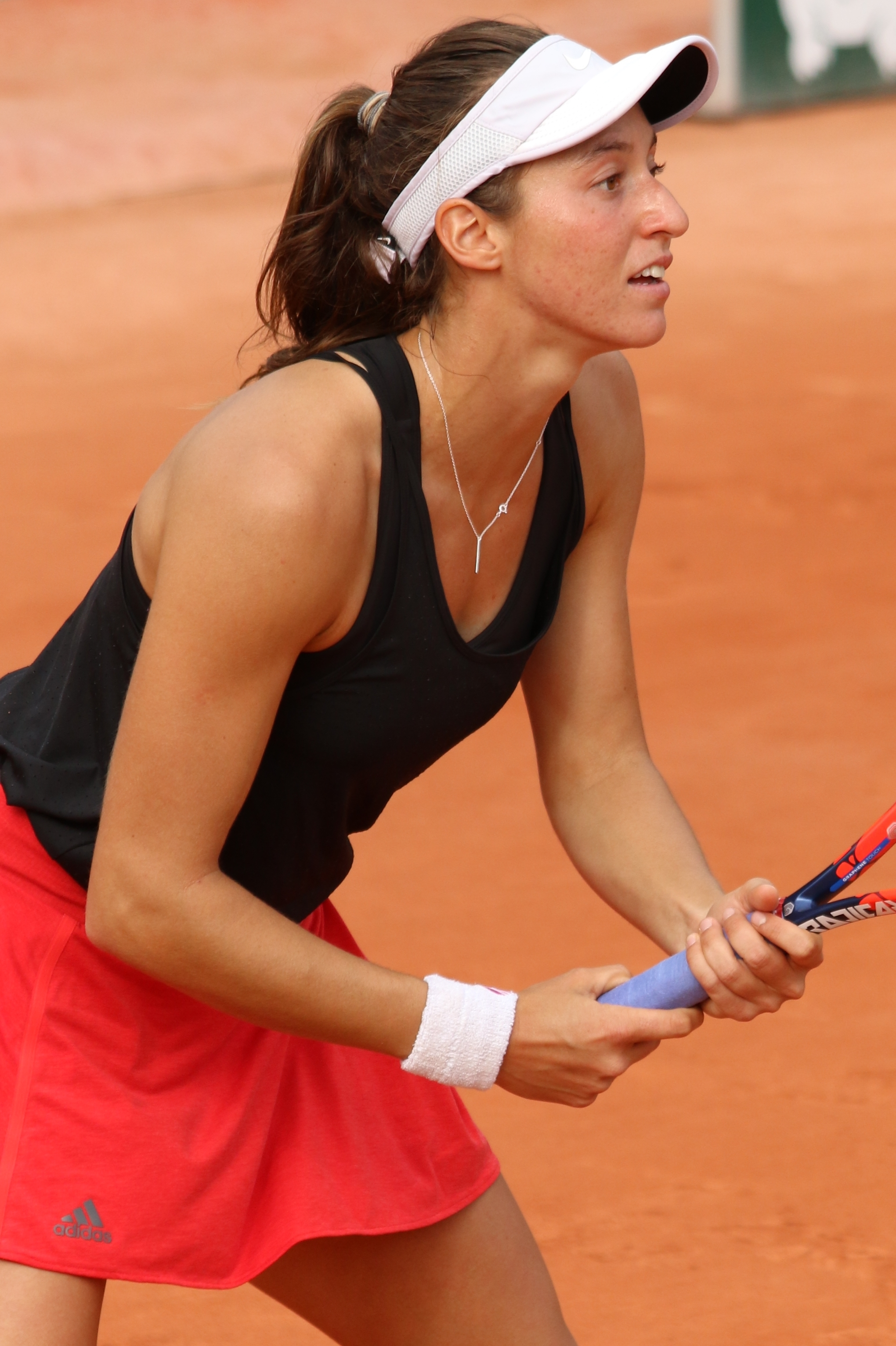
Stefani at the 2019 French Open

Until 2019, Stefani tried to play both singles and doubles. The doubles kept being more productive, and once an invitation to make her tour debut at the 2019 Monterrey Open with Giuliana Olmos led to the semifinals and a ranking increase, she decided to stop playing singles to have more chances at appearing in bigger events. Soon afterward, Stefani made her major main-draw debut at French Open, partnering Australian Astra Sharma in doubles.

In September, alongside Hayley Carter, she reached hre first WTA Tour final in doubles at the Korea Open and, the following week, won the first career title at the Tashkent Open. With these campaigns, she entered the top 100 and reached a career-high ranking in doubles of No. 75 on 21 October 2019. After that, Stefani established a fixed partnership with Carter.

At the 2019 Pan American Games in Lima, Luisa won a bronze medal alongside Carolina Alves.

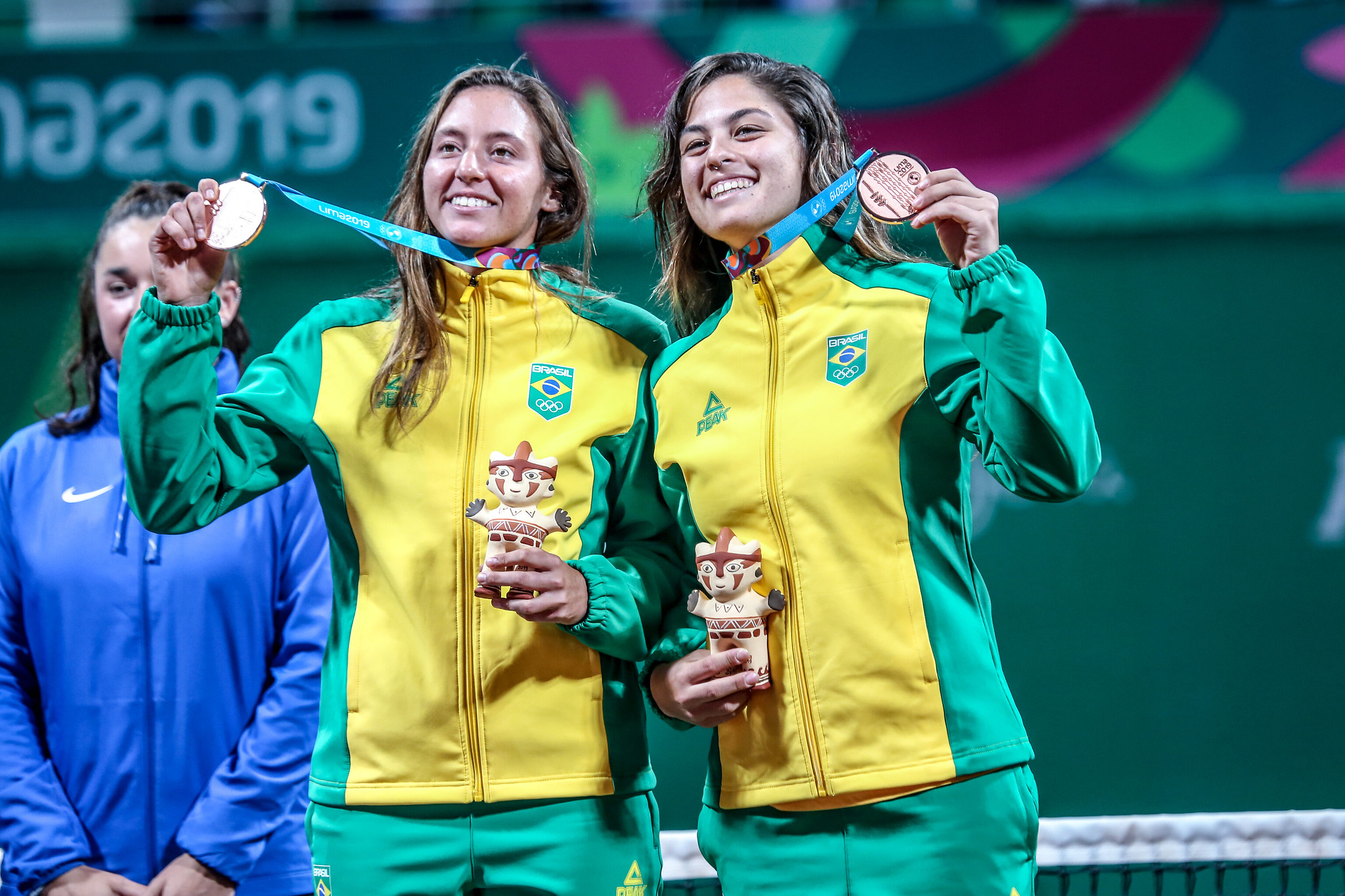
Luisa Stefani and Carolina Alves at the 2019 Pan American Games medal ceremony

=== 2020 ===
In 2020, the Stefani/Carter duo reached the Australian Open third round, won the Challenger Series title in Newport, reached the Dubai quarterfinals in February, and won the Lexington Open in August. With that, they entered the top 40 for the first time.

At the US Open, she had her best major campaign in her career reaching the quarterfinals, defeating the six seeds Japan duo Shuko Aoyama/Ena Shibahara in the round of 16. It had been 38 years since a female doubles player from Brazil had gone as far in a Grand Slam tournament (the last time that Brazilians were in the quarterfinals was in Wimbledon in 1982: Patricia Medrado and Cláudia Monteiro).

At the Italian Open, she reached the semifinals, losing only to the top seeds. In October, she entered her first Premier final in Ostrava, playing with Gabriela Dabrowski.

=== 2021: Olympic doubles bronze, No. 9, injury ===
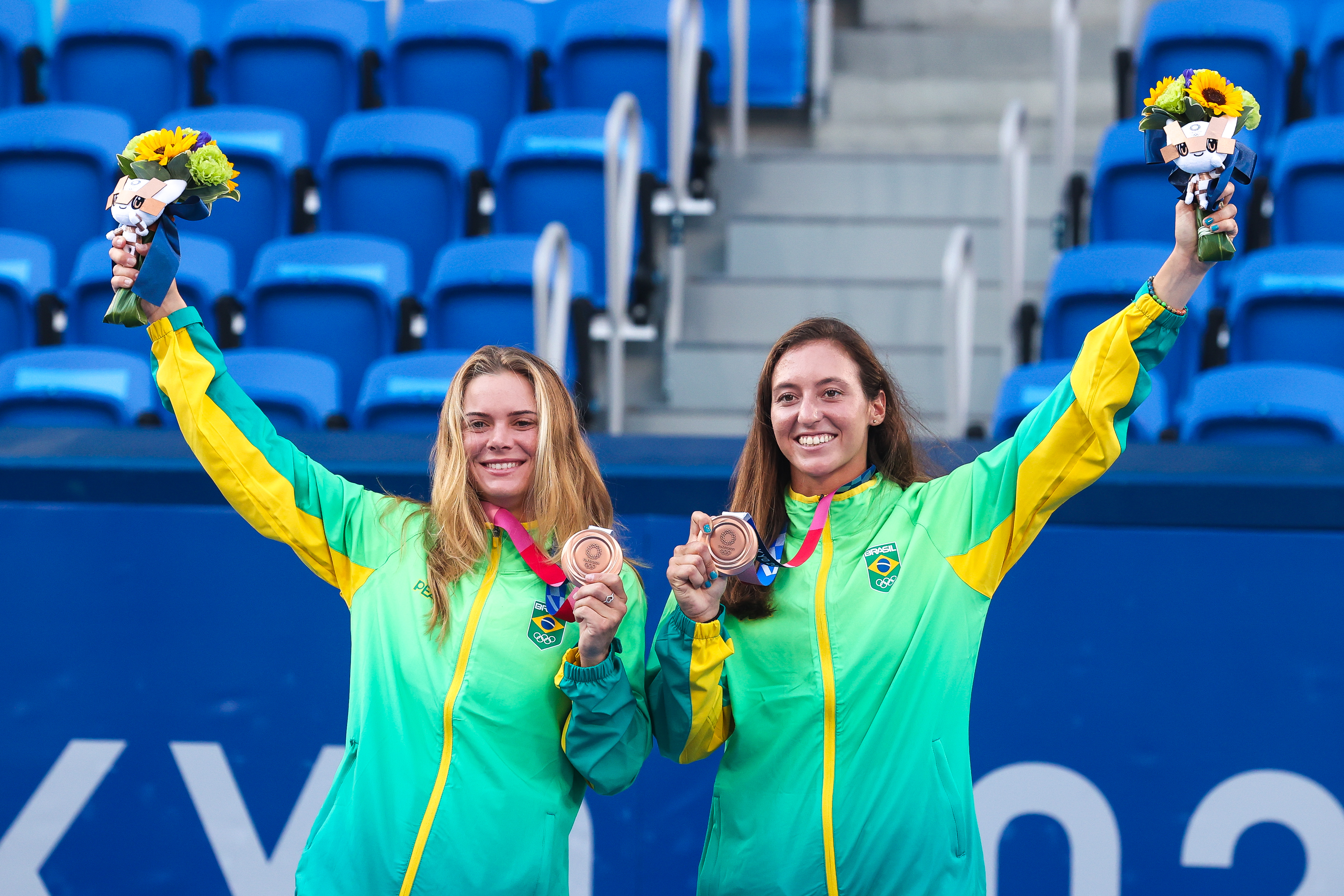
Stefani and Laura Pigossi on the podium at the Tokyo 2020 Olympic Games

Stefani and Carter reached their first WTA 1000 final at the 2021 Miami Open. Stefani had to pass on the French Open, after being forced to endure an emergency appendicitis surgery. With Carter getting a season-ending injury at Wimbledon, Stefani announced she would spend the rest of the year with Gabriela Dabrowski.

At the postponed Tokyo Olympics, Stefani won a bronze medal, partnering Laura Pigossi. Stefani and Pigossi were only granted entry to the Olympics one week before the 2020 Games opened, with Stefani ranked No. 23 in the doubles rankings and Pigossi at No. 190, and had only played together once previously—a defeat at the 2020 Fed Cup. Saving four match points against Czech players Karolína Plíšková and Markéta Vondroušová in the round of 16, they beat Veronika Kudermetova and defending gold medalist Elena Vesnina after saving four match points in the final super tiebreak. Pigossi and Stefani became the first Brazilians in history to obtain an Olympic medal in tennis.

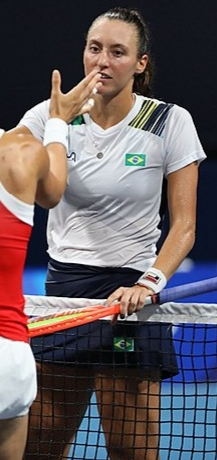
Stefani at Tokyo, 2020

Following the Olympics, seeded fifth, Stefani won her first WTA 1000, partnering Dabrowski, at the Canadian Open avenging their loss in the Silicon Valley Classic final to Darija Jurak and Andreja Klepač. The following week, they followed this successful run by another, reaching the WTA 1000 final at the Cincinnati Open by defeating current Olympic champions, second seeded pair of Krejciková and Siniaková. They lost the final to Sam Stosur and Zhang Shuai.

The US Open had Stefani reaching her first major semifinal and fifth straight in 2021, partnering with Gabriela Dabrowski, only to injure her knee in the decisive game against Coco Gauff and Caty McNally and withdraw. Stefani had to sit out the rest of the season following surgery to mend the anterior cruciate ligament injury. Still in November, she rose to No. 9 of the doubles rankings. The only other Brazilian woman to rank so high was Maria Bueno before the Open era.

During her rehabilitation, Stefani met Guilherme Pachane, a former Brazilian college tennis player who was transitioning to the professional tour. He would later become her boyfriend and eventually take on the role of her head coach, first working alongside Leo Azevedo and later assuming the position on his own.

=== 2022: Guadalajara doubles title, doubles top 50 ===
After nearly a year of recovering from her knee injury, Stefani announced her return to play at the Pan Pacific Open in Tokyo in September, partnered with Ena Shibahara. Before that, she visited the US Open to train among the WTA's best players. During the major event, she arranged with Dabrowski for both to play the Chennai Open the week before Tokyo. Stefani returned to the courts winning the WTA 250 title in Chennai along with Dabrowski.

Ranked No. 217 at the WTA 1000 in Guadalajara, playing with Storm Sanders, she reached an unprecedented Brazilian final at the WTA 1000 level with Beatriz Haddad Maia. Stefani and Sanders won the title in a highly contested match in the tie-breaker. As a result, she returned to the top 100 moving more than 160 positions up to a year-end ranking of No. 55.

Partnering Ingrid Martins, Stefani won the doubles title at the WTA 125 Montevideo Open, defeating Quinn Gleason and Elixane Lechemia in the final. She closed the season at No. 48.

=== 2023: Mixed-doubles title, top 10, first WTA grass title, Pan American champion ===
Stefani announced she would play the 2023 Australian Open with Caty McNally, but withdrew without playing a game once McNally injured herself in the singles tournament. Before that, she got together with McNally's former partner Taylor Townsend at the WTA 500 in Adelaide, where she won the tournament, rising to No. 34 in the world.

Also during the Australian Open, Stefani and Brazilian partner Rafael Matos were crowned champions, after defeating the Indian duo of Sania Mirza and Rohan Bopanna in straight sets. The two became the first all Brazilian pair to win a major, with Stefani herself becoming the second Brazilian woman to ever win any major title.

After winning the mixed doubles title, Stefani said she was devastated when McNally withdrew shortly before their first-round match. She recalled crying after receiving the news, said she felt shaken by the setback, and explained that she eventually accepted there was nothing she could do about the situation.

Along with Zhang Shuai, Stefani won the WTA 500 in Abu Dhabi, returning to the top 30 in doubles. Following two first-round exits, partnering with Anna Danilina, Stefani announced she would reunite with Dabrowski in the following two tournaments. The duo then reached the quarterfinals in Indian Wells, but fell in the first round of the Miami Open. Stefani and Dabrowski also reached the quarterfinals of the WTA 1000 Madrid Open, and the third round at Roland Garros. Afterwards they decided to part ways, with Stefani stating she was frustrated with the low results.

Later, playing with Caroline Garcia, Stefani won her first WTA Tour title on grass at the WTA 500 in Berlin, with this reaching No. 14 in the WTA doubles rankings. Still with Garcia, Stefani reached the quarterfinals of Wimbledon, along the way defeating sixth seeds Leylah Fernandez and Taylor Townsend, and former doubles world No. 1, Tímea Babos (who played alongside Kirsten Flipkens), before losing to the eventual champions, Hsieh Su-wei and Barbora Strýcová.

Stefani made the Cincinnati quarterfinals, partnering Anastasia Pavlyuchenkova, and upon her return to the US Open, alongside Jennifer Brady, repeated the semifinal that preceded her injury. With that, she returned to the top 10. At the China Open, she reached the semifinals playing with compatriot Ingrid Martins, defeating en route second seeds Coco Gauff and Jessica Pegula, and then eighth seeds Laura Siegemund and Vera Zvonareva, avenging her loss at the US Open.

At the 2023 Pan American Games, Stefani and Pigossi won the doubles gold medal. Both having to play two finals on the same day, after winning gold in men's and women's doubles, Stefani and Marcelo Demoliner went to the mixed-doubles final and obtained another medal, now a silver.

In November, Stefanj played alongside Ingrid Martins in the final match of the four-rubber tie between Team Brazil and South Korea in Brasília, part of the play-offs for the Billie Jean King Cup. Stefani was originally set to pair with Beatriz Haddad Maia, but due to strategic changes, she teamed up with Martins instead. Martins and Stefani faced the South Korean duo of Back Da-yeon and Jeong Bo-young, winning the match in straight sets. It was Martin’s debut match representing Brazil in the BJK Cup. Brazil won the tie without dropping a single match.

=== 2024: Third WTA 1000 doubles title ===
Stefani reached the quarterfinals of the Australian Open playing with Demi Schuurs, this being her best campaign in this tournament to date. At the Abu Dhabi Open, she partnered with Beatriz Haddad Maia, with whom she had won two ITF titels in 2019, serving as preparation for the 2024 Summer Olympics given they had the rankings to play the doubles tournament together. They reached the semifinals but had to pull out of the decisive game once Haddad injured herself in the singles semifinal.

At the Qatar Ladies Open, Stefani and Schuurs became tournament champions without losing a single set. It was the third WTA 1000 title in Stefani's career. The duo withdrew without playing in the French Open due to Schuurs feeling back pain, and fell in the first round of Wimbledon. Stefani's return to the Olympics was also short-lived, an opening round loss in the mixed doubles partnering Thiago Seyboth Wild, and a defeat in round 2 in the women's doubles alongside Haddad.

In the US Open, Stefani and Schuurs were quarterfinalists. In October, after falling in round one of the Wuhan Open, even if the pair was still in the chase for the 2024 WTA Finals, Stefani declared she was ending her season sooner due to knee pain.

Because of this, Brazil's team for the BJK Cup November's matches was announced without Stefani. The team selection included Luiza Fullana in her place.

Also in October, Stefani interrupted her vacation and her knee treatment to join the WTA Finals as an alternate player. Originally on a break, Stefani was called to Riyadh, Saudi Arabia to serve as an alternate with Demi Schuurs, ready to participate if needed in the doubles competition.

In late November 2024, Stefani underwent knee surgery. Her recovery period was estimated to be only one month, allowing her to return to the courts in January 2025. While recovering, Stefani co-organized the "Torneio de Duplas Luisa Stefani e Carlos Omaki" in Cotia, São Paulo, held at the end of November 2024. The tournament aimed to promote doubles tennis in Brazil and was deemed a success.

=== 2025: Wimbledon mixed doubles final, year-end Finals, first WTA clay title ===
Luisa Stefani began her 2025 season confident in her recovery and aiming for strong results. She signed a sponsorship deal with the Brazilian sportswear company Slyce, expressing enthusiasm about wearing and representing a local brand. She debuted the Slyce uniform at the Australian Open.

Although she was part of the Brazilian team at the United Cup in Perth, Stefani did not play in any of the matches. The Brazilian team was not able to win any of their matches and was eliminated in the group stage. At the Australian Open, Stefani partnered with American tennis player Peyton Stearns. In the first round of the doubles draw, they faced Ingrid Martins and Irina-Camelia Begu, beating them in straight sets. This was the first match in the 2025 season for Stefani and also her first one in four months.

In their second-round match, Stefani and Stearns lost in straight sets to Zhang Shuai and Kristina Mladenovic. It was the first time Stefani did not play in the Australian Open mixed-doubles draw since her 2021 injury.

In her next tournament, the 2025 Upper Austria Ladies Linz, Stefani was scheduled to play alongside Martins but with a strong entry list, they would be alternates. Because of that, Stefani changed her partner in the last minute and played with Tímea Babos. This was the first time they played together. Babos and Stefani won their semifinal match beating the top-seeded pair of Zhang Shuai and Kateřina Siniaková.

The Brazilian-Hungarian pair won the title in a comeback victory and defeating the Ukrainian twin sisters Lyudmyla and Nadiia Kichenok in the final, which went to a deciding champions tiebreak. This was Stefani's ninth final and ninth consecutive title since she returned from her injury in the 2021 US Open. The WTA 500 title in Linz was her tenth WTA Tour title and her fourth in a WTA 500 tournament.

Next, Stefani played at the Middle East tennis swing, first at the Abu Dhabi Open where she participated alongside Heather Watson, and together they advanced to the quarterfinals in which they faced Zhang and Mladenovic and lost in the decider.

At Doha, Stefani played with Peyton Stearns once again. In this tournament they advanced to the round of 16 and lost in two sets against Veronika Kudermetova and Chan Hao-ching, and Stefani failed to defend her title playing with Demi Schuurs in 2024.

Last, Stefani formed a partnership with former world No. 1 and major champion, Bethanie Mattek-Sands, to play at the Dubai Open in which they reached the quarterfinals but lost to Jeļena Ostapenko and Hsieh Su-wei.

Stefani then went to play at the 2025 Indian Wells Open, where she formed a first time partnership with Leylah Fernandez. They stopped at the first round losing to Gabriela Dabrowski, Stefani's former doubles partner, and Erin Routliffe in the decider.

In the next week, Stefani was called once again to join the Time Brasil BRB, Brazil's team for the BJK Cup. This was the first time she was chosen to be in the team since the first semester of 2024, at the tie against Germany.

Then, Stefani announced that she would resume her partnership with Babos, which would initially continue until the end of the clay court season. First they played at the Miami Open and reached the round of 16, losing to Zhang Shuai and Elise Mertens in straight sets.

Then Stefani went to Ostrava for the BJK Cup, in which she played two matches, first with Haddad Maia, in which they faced Czech players Tereza Valentová and Linda Nosková, winning in straight sets, and next alongside Laura Pigossi, facing the Spaniards Sara Sorribes Tormo and Cristina Bucsa, losing in straight sets.

Continuing her partnership with Babos, they played at the WTA 500 Stuttgart Open. They advanced to the semifinals but lost to Gabriela Dabrowski and Erin Routliffe, the top-seeded pair of the tournament, in three sets. Next, they played two WTA 1000 tournaments: first in Madrid, where they lost on the first round to Eri Hozumi and Ulrikke Eikeri, then they went to Rome and also lost in the first round, both in straight sets, this time playing against Veronika Kudermetova and Elise Mertens.

After that, Stefani and Babos made their best performance on clay, winning their second title together at the WTA 500 event in Strasbourg. They overcame Guo Hanyu and Nicole Melichar-Martinez in the final, in three sets. This was Stefani's fifth WTA 500 title, her 11th WTA Tour title in general and the first on clay. This was also the first time Stefani won a title with the same partner, since she returned from her injury at the 2021 US Open.

At Wimbledon, she reached the quarterfinals of the ladies’ doubles, alongside Babos, and reached the final in mixed doubles, partnering Joe Salisbury, marking the first Brazilian to get that stage of the tournament since Maria Bueno 58 years prior and the second ever in history. They lost the championship match to Sem Verbeek and Kateřina Siniaková. Stefani and Salisbury had previously only played one tournament together, at the 2023 US Open.

In September, Stefani participated in the first edition of the SP Open, a WTA 250 in her hometown of São Paulo. Once again playing alongside Babos, she was the champion, winning in three sets against compatriots Laura Pigossi and Ingrid Martins at the final, losing only one set through the campaign.

Then Stefani and Babos went to play at the Asian hard courts tournaments. At the China Open at Beijing they reached the quarterfinals, before losing in two sets to Miyu Kato and Fanny Stollár. At the Wuhan Open, they stopped at the round of 16 where they lost to Iva Jovic and Giuliana Olmos, in three sets.

At the Ningbo International Open they were runners-up and lost to Nicole Melichar-Martinez and Liudmila Samsonova at the final. By reaching the final, Babos and Stefani got the remaining points they needed to qualify for the WTA Finals at the seventh position. This was the first time Stefani qualified for the WTA Finals and the second time ever for a Brazilian.

Lastly, Babos and Stefani got to be the champions of the Pan Pacific Open in Tokyo, beating Anna Danilina and Aleksandra Krunić in straight sets at the final, securing their fourth title together in their fifth final.

In October, Stefani and Babos were selected to be in a poll on WTA's Instagram account for the “Shot of the month” with a no-look backhand shot from Stefani at the opening set of the doubles final in Ningbo. They won the poll by being the most voted by the public.

At the WTA Finals, Babos and Stefani started in the Liezel Huber Group. They finished the round-robin stage as the second best team, after losing in three sets to Taylor Townsend and Kateřina Siniaková in the first match, winning against Mirra Andreeva and Diana Shneider in three sets in the second match and finally winning against Gabriela Dabrowski and Erin Routliffe, in three sets. Those results made Stefani to become the first ever Brazilian player in history to go beyond the WTA Finals' round-robin stage and reach the semifinals. In the semifinals, they beat Hsieh Su-wei and Jelena Ostapenko in two sets. Thus Stefani became the first Brazilian to reach the WTA Finals final. However, they were defeated by Mertens and Kudermetova in two sets.

Stefani finished the 2025 season as No. 14 in the doubles ranking, making a return to the top 15.

In the next week Stefani joined the Time Brasil BRB for the BJK Cup playoffs against Portugal and Australia, in the city of Hobart. Stefani played in the final match of the tie against Portugal alongside Ingrid Martins. They faced Inês Murta and Angelina Voloshchuk, securing a three set win to help Brazil finish the tie with only wins. Brazil then went to lose against Australia and was knocked back to the zonal group.

In December, Stefani and Babos were selected to be in a poll on WTA's Instagram account for the “Shot of the year” with that same October winner point of a no-look backhand shot from Stefani at the opening set of the doubles final in Ningbo.

=== 2026: Back with Dabrowski, Wimbledon finalist, world No. 3 ===
In November 2025, Stefani announced that she would return to play alongside Dabrowski after almost three years since their last match together, initially to participate at the Adelaide International. Despite this, Stefani and Dabrowski did not compete in Adelaide together, as Dabrowski suffered a foot injury on the pre-season and chose not to participate, in order to recover for the Australian Open. Instead, Stefani played alongside Marie Bouzková. Stefani and Bouzková won their opening match in two sets against Ulrikke Eikeri and Ingrid Neel, but withdrew from the second round due to Bouzková not feeling well.

At the Australian Open, Stefani started by playing in the exhibition event mixed doubles showdown, in which she played alongside Salvadoran Marcelo Arevalo. They were defeated in the final by Australians Ellen Perez and Nick Kyrgios, with a score of 10/9. She played in the mixed-doubles draw alongside Marcelo Arevalo, and they reached the semifinals where they were defeated in three sets by the French pair of Manuel Guinard and Kristina Mladenovic. Stefani and Dabrowski resumed their partnership at the doubles draw of the Australian Open in which they reached the semifinals and were defeated in three sets by Danilina and Krunić. This was the first time that Stefani played at the Australian Open women's doubles semifinal.

Next, Stefani and Drabrowski went to play at the Middle Eastern Swing, first at the Qatar Open, where they also reached the semifinals and also lost to Danilina and Krunić, this time in two sets.

Ending their Middle Eastern campaign, Stefani and Dabrowski played at the Dubai Championships in which they won the third title of their partnership, their first since 2022 and their second on the WTA 1000 level, by defeating Laura Siegemund and Vera Zvonareva in two sets at the final. This was the fourteenth title of Stefani's career on WTA Tour tournaments and her fourth on the WTA 1000-level.

Stefani and Dabrowski played at the Miami Open and reached their fourth semifinal of the season in five tournaments overall. They were defeated by Kateřina Siniaková and Taylor Townsend in three sets. Then, citing a discomfort on her foot, Stefani decided to withdraw from the Madrid Open and not to join the Brazilian team at the Billie Jean King Cup, that was scheduled to play at the Americas Zone stage. She also did not participate in any of the other tournaments until the Italian Open in Rome.

Stefani and Dabrowski played at Strasbourg where they won the title, defeating Quinn Gleason and Ulrikke Eikeri in straight sets in the final. It was their fourth title playing together, the second on 2026, and the very first on clay. For the first time in her career, Luisa Stefani successfully defended a tour title, which also marked the first time she won the same WTA Tour tournament for a second time. It was the 15th WTA Tour title for Stefani.

At the 2026 French Open, Stefani and Dabrowski reached the doubles semifinals, where they faced Townsend and Siniaková and were defeated in two sets, making this the first time Stefani got this far on the French Open women's doubles draw. After the French Open, Stefani reached the best doubles ranking of her career, becoming world No. 7 for the first time.

Stefani and Dabrowski then started the grass-court season by playing at the 2026 Queen's Club Championships, this being their first grass court tournament together, in which they reached the second round and where defeated by Americans Iva Jović and McCartney Kessler in three sets. Then, they played at the 2026 Eastbourne Open, in which they won the title by defeating the Czech pair of Jesika Malečková and Miriam Škoch, in straight sets in the final which was postponed by one day due to rain. This was their third title of the season on their third final. With that, they reached five titles playing together, this being their first on grass and the second on the WTA 250 level. This was Stefani's sixteenth title on the WTA Tour.

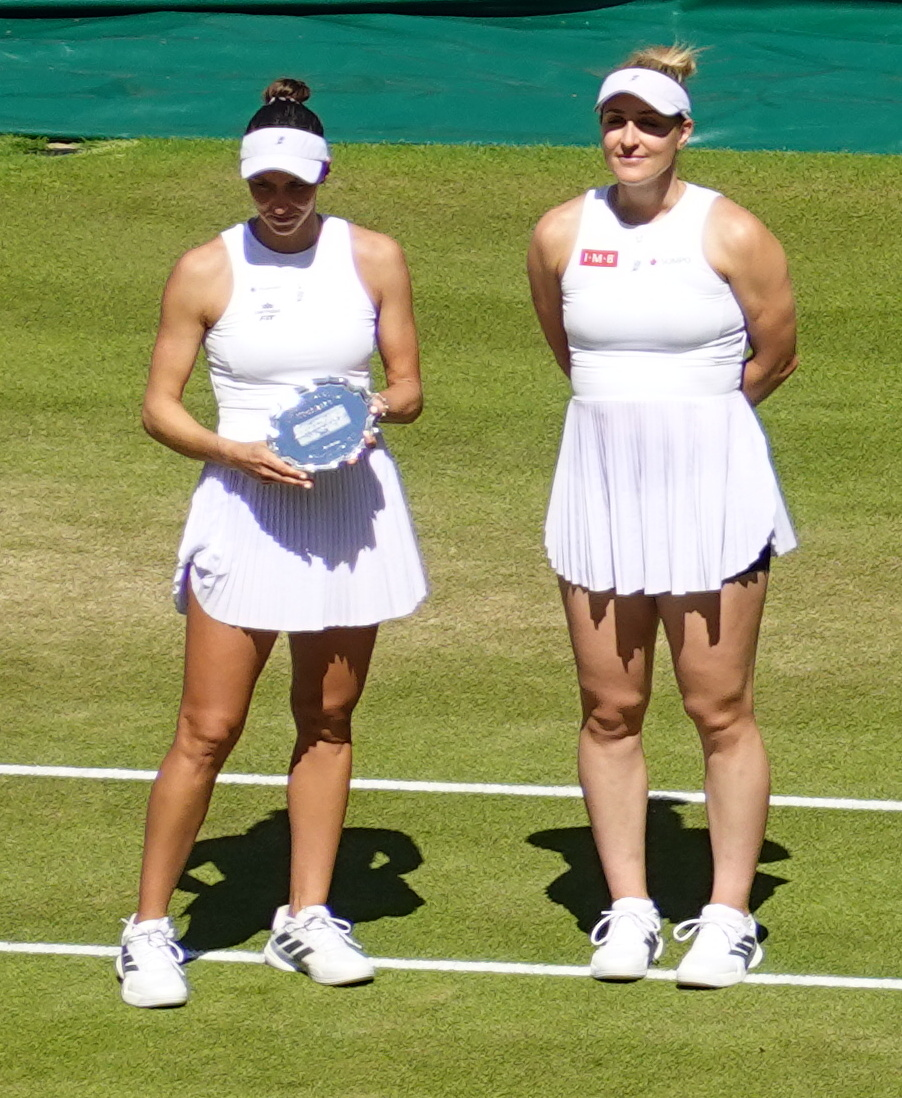
Stefani and Dabrowski at the 2026 Wimbledon women's doubles final trophy ceremony

At the 2026 Wimbledon Championships – Women's doubles, In their first semifinal, they defeated No. 13 seeds Shuko Aoyama and En-shuo Liang, to qualify for the final. It was both the pair's first Grand Slam final together and Stefani's first Grand Slam final of her career. They were then defeated in straight sets by tenth seeds Guo Hanyu and Kristina Mladenovic. After the Wimbledon Championships, Stefani reached the best doubles ranking of her career, becoming world No. 4 for the first time.

Stefani was also a US Open semifinalist where she and Dabrowski where defeated by Americans Ashlyn Krueger and Robin Montgomery, with scores of 4/6, 6/4, and 7/6, including a match tie-break, during which they led 8–2 and served at 5–4 in the third set, a result that propelled her to a career-high ranking of world No. 3, won the SP Open (WTA 250 event) in São Paulo, defending her title by defeating Americans Anna Rogers and Allura Zamarripa in three sets of a final that happened in two days because of rain, and claimed back-to-back WTA 1000 titles in Beijing and Wuhan, her first two titles at this level on Asian tournaments. They defeated the pair of Kateřina Siniaková and Zhang Shuai in straight sets in the Beijing final, and Katerina Siniakova and Storm Hunter in the Wuhan final, also in straight sets.

With those results, Stefani and Dabrowski became the top ranked pair of the 2026 WTA Tour season.

They were also runners-up at the WTA 500 in Tokyo, defeated in the final in straight sets by Jasmine Paolini and Sara Errani.

== Personal life ==
Stefani has described herself as a fan of the television series Ted Lasso, particularly the character Roy Kent, and has expressed a desire to meet the cast.

Stefani grew up idolizing Roger Federer and Kim Clijsters.

Since 2022, Stefani has been in a relationship with Guilherme Pachane, a former Brazilian collegiate tennis player, who has also served as her coach since 2024.

Stefani's said many times that her favorite tennis tournament is the Australian Open.

Luisa Stefani has two tattoos on the back of her arms. On her left arm, she bears a depiction of the Olympic rings, made shortly after she won the bronze medal with Laura Pigossi at the 2020 Olympics.

On her right arm, she has a tattoo of the three letters “F”, representing the Portuguese phrase “Foco, força e fé” (translated as “Focus, strength and faith”). The phrase was a personal mantra shared by her late maternal grandfather, Airton, who would repeat it before and after her matches. Stefani had the tattoo done shortly after winning the mixed doubles title at the 2023 Australian Open and, according to Stefani, it was a way to honor her grandfather, whom she considers her greatest role model.

Stefani speaks Portuguese, Spanish, English, and some Italian.

== Career statistics ==
=== Grand Slam tournament performance timelines ===
Key
W	F	SF	QF	#R	RR	Q#	DNQ	A	NH

(W) winner; (F) finalist; (SF) semifinalist; (QF) quarterfinalist; (#R) rounds 4, 3, 2, 1; (RR) round-robin stage; (Q#) qualification round; (DNQ) did not qualify; (A) absent; (NH) not held; (SR) strike rate (events won / competed); (W–L) win–loss record.
To avoid confusion and double counting, these charts are updated at the conclusion of a tournament or when the player's participation has ended.

==== Doubles ====
Tournament	2019	2020	2021	2022	2023	2024	2025	2026	SR	W–L	Win%
Australian Open	A	3R	3R	A	A	QF	2R	SF	0 / 5	12–5	71%
French Open	1R	3R	A	A	3R	A	3R	SF	0 / 5	10–5	67%
Wimbledon	A	NH	1R	A	QF	1R	QF	F	0 / 5	11–5	69%
US Open	A	QF	SF	A	SF	QF	QF	SF	0 / 6	21–6	77%
Win–Loss	0–1	7–3	6–3	0–0	9–3	6–3	9–4	17–4	0 / 20	54–21	72%

==== Mixed doubles ====
Tournament	2021	2022	2023	2024	2025	SR	W–L	Win%
Australian Open	2R	A	W	1R	A	1 / 3	6–2	75%
French Open	A	A	QF	A	2R	0 / 2	3–2	60%
Wimbledon	2R	A	1R	1R	F	0 / 4	5–4	56%
US Open	1R	A	1R	1R	A	0 / 3	0–3	0%
Win–Loss	2–3	0–0	7–3	0–3	5–2	1 / 12	14–11	56%

=== Grand Slam tournament finals ===
==== Doubles: 1 (runner-up) ====
Result	Year	Tournament	Surface	Partner	Opponents	Score
Loss	2026	Wimbledon	Grass	(Canada) Gabriela Dabrowski	(France) Kristina Mladenovic (China) Guo Hanyu	3–6, 5–7

==== Mixed doubles: 2 (1 title, 1 runner-up) ====
Result	Year	Tournament	Surface	Partner	Opponents	Score
Win	2023	Australian Open	Hard	(Brazil) Rafael Matos	(India) Sania Mirza (India) Rohan Bopanna	7–6^{(7–2)}, 6–2
Loss	2025	Wimbledon	Grass	(United Kingdom) Joe Salisbury	(Czech Republic) Kateřina Siniaková (Netherlands) Sem Verbeek	6–7^{(3–7)}, 6–7^{(3–7)}

=== Olympic medal matches ===
==== Doubles: 1 (bronze medal) ====
Result	Year	Tournament	Surface	Partner	Opponents	Score
Bronze	2021	Tokyo Olympics	Hard	(Brazil) Laura Pigossi	(Russia) Veronika Kudermetova (Russia) Elena Vesnina	4–6, 6–4, [11–9]

=== Year-end championships finals ===
==== Doubles: 1 (runner-up) ====
Result	Year	Location	Surface	Partner	Opponents	Score
Loss	2025	WTA Finals, Saudi Arabia	Hard (i)	(Hungary) Tímea Babos	Veronika Kudermetova (Belgium) Elise Mertens	6–7^{(4–7)}, 1–6

== Awards ==
2021

- Prêmio Brasil Olímpico - Best Brazilian tennis player of the year (tied with Laura Pigossi)
