= 2022 ITF Women's World Tennis Tour (July–September) =

The 2022 ITF Women's World Tennis Tour is the 2022 edition of the second-tier tour for women's professional tennis. It is organised by the International Tennis Federation and is a tier below the WTA Tour. The ITF Women's World Tennis Tour includes tournaments in five categories with prize money ranging from $15,000 up to $100,000.

== Key ==
Category
W100 tournaments
W80 tournaments
W60 tournaments
W25 tournaments
W15 tournaments

== Month ==
=== July ===
Week of	Tournament	Winner	Runners-up	Semifinalists	Quarterfinalists
July 4	Reinert Open; Versmold, Germany; Clay; W100; Singles – Doubles	(Czech Republic) Linda Nosková; 6–1, 6–3	(Belgium) Ysaline Bonaventure	(Hungary) Réka Luca Jani (Argentina) Nadia Podoroska	(France) Chloé Paquet (Germany) Noma Noha Akugue (Austria) Julia Grabher (Netherlands) Arianne Hartono
July 4	Reinert Open; Versmold, Germany; Clay; W100; Singles – Doubles	(Kazakhstan) Anna Danilina (Netherlands) Arianne Hartono; 6–7^{(4–7)}, 6–4, [10–6]	(India) Ankita Raina (Netherlands) Rosalie van der Hoek	(Hungary) Réka Luca Jani (Argentina) Nadia Podoroska	(France) Chloé Paquet (Germany) Noma Noha Akugue (Austria) Julia Grabher (Netherlands) Arianne Hartono
July 4	Amstelveen Women's Open; Amstelveen, Netherlands; Clay; W60; Singles – Doubles	(Switzerland) Simona Waltert; 7–6^{(12–10)}, 6–0	(United States) Emma Navarro	(Czech Republic) Sára Bejlek (Netherlands) Quirine Lemoine	(Austria) Barbara Haas (Spain) Aliona Bolsova (Croatia) Antonia Ružić (Netherlands) Suzan Lamens
July 4	Amstelveen Women's Open; Amstelveen, Netherlands; Clay; W60; Singles – Doubles	(Spain) Aliona Bolsova (Spain) Guiomar Maristany; 6–2, 6–2	(Czech Republic) Michaela Bayerlová (Czech Republic) Aneta Laboutková	(Czech Republic) Sára Bejlek (Netherlands) Quirine Lemoine	(Austria) Barbara Haas (Spain) Aliona Bolsova (Croatia) Antonia Ružić (Netherlands) Suzan Lamens
July 4	Corroios-Seixal, Portugal; Hard; W25; Singles and doubles draws	(Netherlands) Lesley Pattinama Kerkhove; 6–4, 6–4	(Israel) Lina Glushko	(China) Zhu Lin; Vitalia Diatchenko	(Lithuania) Justina Mikulskytė (Switzerland) Lulu Sun (Australia) Kimberly Birrell (Australia) Alexandra Bozovic
July 4	Corroios-Seixal, Portugal; Hard; W25; Singles and doubles draws	(Lithuania) Justina Mikulskytė (Hong Kong) Cody Wong; 6–2, 7–5	(Chinese Taipei) Lee Ya-hsuan (Chinese Taipei) Wu Fang-hsien	(China) Zhu Lin; Vitalia Diatchenko	(Lithuania) Justina Mikulskytė (Switzerland) Lulu Sun (Australia) Kimberly Birrell (Australia) Alexandra Bozovic
July 4	Getxo, Spain; Clay; W25; Singles and doubles draws	(France) Séléna Janicijevic; 4–6, 6–4, 7–5	(Greece) Sapfo Sakellaridi	(France) Marine Partaud (Spain) Ángela Fita Boluda	(Spain) Carlota Martínez Círez (Romania) Ioana Loredana Roșca (Ukraine) Valeriya Strakhova (Switzerland) Jenny Dürst
July 4	Getxo, Spain; Clay; W25; Singles and doubles draws	(Spain) Jéssica Bouzas Maneiro (Spain) Leyre Romero Gormaz; 7–5, 6–0	(South Korea) Park So-hyun (Greece) Sapfo Sakellaridi	(France) Marine Partaud (Spain) Ángela Fita Boluda	(Spain) Carlota Martínez Círez (Romania) Ioana Loredana Roșca (Ukraine) Valeriya Strakhova (Switzerland) Jenny Dürst
July 4	Casablanca, Morocco; Clay; W15; Singles and doubles draws	(Germany) Chantal Sauvant; 7–6^{(7–2)}, 6–4	(Switzerland) Nadine Keller	(Belgium) Lara Salden (Morocco) Yasmine Kabbaj	(Benin) Gloriana Goreti Nahum (Spain) Noelia Bouzó Zanotti (Belgium) Vicky Van de Peer (Morocco) Aya El Aouni
July 4	Casablanca, Morocco; Clay; W15; Singles and doubles draws	Anastasiia Gureva (France) Laïa Petretic; 6–1, 6–2	(Spain) Paula Arias Manjón (Switzerland) Marie Mettraux	(Belgium) Lara Salden (Morocco) Yasmine Kabbaj	(Benin) Gloriana Goreti Nahum (Spain) Noelia Bouzó Zanotti (Belgium) Vicky Van de Peer (Morocco) Aya El Aouni
July 4	Monastir, Tunisia; Hard; W15; Singles and doubles draws	(France) Yasmine Mansouri; 6–2, 6–4	(China) Yao Xinxin	(Japan) Yuka Hosoki (Czech Republic) Zdena Šafářová	(Italy) Lara Pfeifer (Italy) Miriana Tona (Chinese Taipei) Cho I-hsuan (Indonesia) Priska Madelyn Nugroho
July 4	Monastir, Tunisia; Hard; W15; Singles and doubles draws	(New Zealand) Valentina Ivanov (Australia) Lisa Mays; 6–4, 6–7^{(2–7)}, [10–8]	(Chinese Taipei) Cho I-hsuan (China) Yao Xinxin	(Japan) Yuka Hosoki (Czech Republic) Zdena Šafářová	(Italy) Lara Pfeifer (Italy) Miriana Tona (Chinese Taipei) Cho I-hsuan (Indonesia) Priska Madelyn Nugroho
July 4	Fountain Valley, United States; Hard; W15; Singles and doubles draws	(Chinese Taipei) Yang Ya-yi; 6–2, 6–2	(United States) Makenna Jones	(United States) Katie Codd (United States) Malaika Rapolu	(United States) Allie Kiick (China) Han Jiangxue (Ukraine) Sabina Zeynalova (United States) Alexandra Yepifanova
July 4	Fountain Valley, United States; Hard; W15; Singles and doubles draws	(United States) Hind Abdelouahid (Chinese Taipei) Yang Ya-yi; 7–5, 2–6, [10–6]	(China) Han Jiangxue (South Korea) Kim Da-bin	(United States) Katie Codd (United States) Malaika Rapolu	(United States) Allie Kiick (China) Han Jiangxue (Ukraine) Sabina Zeynalova (United States) Alexandra Yepifanova
July 11	Torneo Internazionale Femminile Antico Tiro a Volo; Rome, Italy; Clay; W60+H; Singles – Doubles	(Croatia) Tara Würth; 6–3, 6–4	(France) Chloé Paquet	(Cyprus) Raluca Șerban; Diana Shnaider	(Australia) Olivia Gadecki (Italy) Lucrezia Stefanini; Elina Avanesyan (Bulgaria) Isabella Shinikova
July 11	Torneo Internazionale Femminile Antico Tiro a Volo; Rome, Italy; Clay; W60+H; Singles – Doubles	(Venezuela) Andrea Gámiz (Netherlands) Eva Vedder; 7–5, 2–6, [13–11]	(France) Estelle Cascino (Italy) Camilla Rosatello	(Cyprus) Raluca Șerban; Diana Shnaider	(Australia) Olivia Gadecki (Italy) Lucrezia Stefanini; Elina Avanesyan (Bulgaria) Isabella Shinikova
July 11	Liepāja Open; Liepāja, Latvia; Clay; W60; Singles – Doubles	(United States) Emma Navarro; 6–4, 6–4	(China) Yuan Yue	(Slovenia) Dalila Jakupović (Czech Republic) Anna Sisková	(Netherlands) Arantxa Rus (Italy) Martina Colmegna (Greece) Valentini Grammatikopoulou (Bosnia and Herzegovina) Nefisa Berberović
July 11	Liepāja Open; Liepāja, Latvia; Clay; W60; Singles – Doubles	(Slovenia) Dalila Jakupović (Serbia) Ivana Jorović; 6–4, 6–3	(United Kingdom) Emily Appleton (India) Prarthana Thombare	(Slovenia) Dalila Jakupović (Czech Republic) Anna Sisková	(Netherlands) Arantxa Rus (Italy) Martina Colmegna (Greece) Valentini Grammatikopoulou (Bosnia and Herzegovina) Nefisa Berberović
July 11	Aschaffenburg, Germany; Clay; W25; Singles and doubles draws	(Spain) Jéssica Bouzas Maneiro; 6–1, 6–2	(Germany) Katharina Hobgarski	Kristina Dmitruk; Darya Astakhova	(Germany) Ella Seidel (Slovenia) Živa Falkner (France) Alice Tubello (Czech Republic) Aneta Kučmová
July 11	Aschaffenburg, Germany; Clay; W25; Singles and doubles draws	Irina Khromacheva; Maria Timofeeva; 6–2, 5–7, [10–3]	(Czech Republic) Karolína Kubáňová (Czech Republic) Ivana Šebestová	Kristina Dmitruk; Darya Astakhova	(Germany) Ella Seidel (Slovenia) Živa Falkner (France) Alice Tubello (Czech Republic) Aneta Kučmová
July 11	Nur-Sultan, Kazakhstan; Hard; W25; Singles and doubles draws	Mariia Tkacheva; 7–6^{(7–2)}, 6–2	(Japan) Moyuka Uchijima	(Uzbekistan) Nigina Abduraimova (Georgia (country)) Mariam Bolkvadze	Polina Kudermetova; Tatiana Barkova; Vera Lapko (Serbia) Natalija Stevanović
July 11	Nur-Sultan, Kazakhstan; Hard; W25; Singles and doubles draws	(Japan) Momoko Kobori (India) Ankita Raina; 6–2, 3–6, [10–8]	(South Korea) Choi Ji-hee (South Korea) Han Na-lae	(Uzbekistan) Nigina Abduraimova (Georgia (country)) Mariam Bolkvadze	Polina Kudermetova; Tatiana Barkova; Vera Lapko (Serbia) Natalija Stevanović
July 11	Guimarães, Portugal; Hard; W25; Singles and doubles draws	(Spain) Rosa Vicens Mas; 6–4, 6–1	(Australia) Alexandra Bozovic	(Australia) Kimberly Birrell (Turkey) Pemra Özgen	(United Kingdom) Sarah Beth Grey (United States) Ashley Lahey (Japan) Erika Sema (Serbia) Katarina Jokić
July 11	Guimarães, Portugal; Hard; W25; Singles and doubles draws	(Portugal) Francisca Jorge (Portugal) Matilde Jorge; 6–3, 6–1	(United Kingdom) Sarah Beth Grey (United States) Jamie Loeb	(Australia) Kimberly Birrell (Turkey) Pemra Özgen	(United Kingdom) Sarah Beth Grey (United States) Ashley Lahey (Japan) Erika Sema (Serbia) Katarina Jokić
July 11	Roehampton, United Kingdom; Hard; W25; Singles and doubles draws	(United States) Danielle Lao; 7–5, 6–4	(Netherlands) Lesley Pattinama Kerkhove	(Lithuania) Justina Mikulskytė (Slovakia) Viktória Kužmová	(Chinese Taipei) Joanna Garland (United Kingdom) Eliz Maloney (France) Julie Belgraver (South Africa) Isabella Kruger
July 11	Roehampton, United Kingdom; Hard; W25; Singles and doubles draws	(United Kingdom) Naiktha Bains (United Kingdom) Maia Lumsden; 6–1, 7–6^{(7–4)}	(United Kingdom) Lauryn John-Baptiste (Slovakia) Katarína Strešnáková	(Lithuania) Justina Mikulskytė (Slovakia) Viktória Kužmová	(Chinese Taipei) Joanna Garland (United Kingdom) Eliz Maloney (France) Julie Belgraver (South Africa) Isabella Kruger
July 11	Cancún, Mexico; Hard; W15; Singles and doubles draws	(Mexico) Victoria Rodríguez; 6–3, 6–1	(Mexico) Lya Isabel Fernández Olivares	(Argentina) Melany Krywoj (United States) Sofia Sewing	(Japan) Hikaru Sato; Noel Saidenova (France) Sophia Biolay (Canada) Vanessa Wong
July 11	Cancún, Mexico; Hard; W15; Singles and doubles draws	(Mexico) Jessica Hinojosa Gómez (Mexico) Victoria Rodríguez; 6–2, 7–5	(Spain) Alicia Herrero Liñana (Argentina) Melany Krywoj	(Argentina) Melany Krywoj (United States) Sofia Sewing	(Japan) Hikaru Sato; Noel Saidenova (France) Sophia Biolay (Canada) Vanessa Wong
July 11	Casablanca, Morocco; Clay; W15; Singles and doubles draws	(Morocco) Yasmine Kabbaj; 6–4, 6–3	(Germany) Chantal Sauvant	(Belgium) Vicky Van de Peer (Spain) Carlota Martínez Círez	(Slovakia) Katarína Kužmová (Switzerland) Nadine Keller (Morocco) Aya El Aouni (Bulgaria) Ani Vangelova
July 11	Casablanca, Morocco; Clay; W15; Singles and doubles draws	Anastasiia Gureva (Finland) Laura Hietaranta; 6–2, 6–2	(Switzerland) Marie Mettraux (Italy) Federica Prati	(Belgium) Vicky Van de Peer (Spain) Carlota Martínez Círez	(Slovakia) Katarína Kužmová (Switzerland) Nadine Keller (Morocco) Aya El Aouni (Bulgaria) Ani Vangelova
July 11	Don Benito, Spain; Carpet; W15; Singles and doubles draws	(Switzerland) Valentina Ryser; 4–6, 6–2, 6–1	(Romania) Karola Bejenaru	(Italy) Maria Vittoria Viviani (France) Tiphanie Fiquet	(Spain) Lidia Moreno Arias (Spain) Olga Parres Azcoitia (France) Chloé Noël (South Korea) Shin Ji-ho
July 11	Don Benito, Spain; Carpet; W15; Singles and doubles draws	(United Kingdom) Emilie Lindh (Switzerland) Valentina Ryser; 7–6^{(7–5)}, 7–5	(Austria) Tamara Kostic (Argentina) Lucía Peyre	(Italy) Maria Vittoria Viviani (France) Tiphanie Fiquet	(Spain) Lidia Moreno Arias (Spain) Olga Parres Azcoitia (France) Chloé Noël (South Korea) Shin Ji-ho
July 11	Monastir, Tunisia; Hard; W15; Singles and doubles draws	(Turkey) Zeynep Sönmez; 6–2, 4–6, 7–6^{(7–1)}	(Indonesia) Priska Madelyn Nugroho	(China) Wei Sijia (China) Yao Xinxin	(New Zealand) Valentina Ivanov (Serbia) Elena Milovanović (United States) Ava Hrastar (France) Karine Marion Job
July 11	Monastir, Tunisia; Hard; W15; Singles and doubles draws	(China) Chen Mengyi (Czech Republic) Zdena Šafářová; 7–5, 6–1	(Serbia) Elena Milovanović (Belgium) Eliessa Vanlangendonck	(China) Wei Sijia (China) Yao Xinxin	(New Zealand) Valentina Ivanov (Serbia) Elena Milovanović (United States) Ava Hrastar (France) Karine Marion Job
July 11	Lakewood, United States; Hard; W15; Singles and doubles draws	(China) Han Jiangxue; 7–5, 7–5	(South Korea) Kim Da-bin	(Slovakia) Martina Okáľová (United States) Madison Sieg	(United States) Salma Ewing (United States) Katherine Hui (United States) Carolyn Ansari (United States) Eryn Cayetano
July 11	Lakewood, United States; Hard; W15; Singles and doubles draws	(United States) Makenna Jones (United States) Brienne Minor; 6–4, 6–0	(United States) Taylor Cataldi (United States) Isabella Chhiv	(Slovakia) Martina Okáľová (United States) Madison Sieg	(United States) Salma Ewing (United States) Katherine Hui (United States) Carolyn Ansari (United States) Eryn Cayetano
July 18	ITS Cup; Olomouc, Czech Republic; Clay; W60; Singles – Doubles	(Czech Republic) Sára Bejlek; 6–2, 7–6^{(7–0)}	(North Macedonia) Lina Gjorcheska	(Burundi) Sada Nahimana; Darya Astakhova	(Romania) Miriam Bulgaru (Japan) Kurumi Nara (United States) Emma Navarro (Poland) Maja Chwalińska
July 18	ITS Cup; Olomouc, Czech Republic; Clay; W60; Singles – Doubles	(Italy) Giulia Gatto-Monticone (Burundi) Sada Nahimana; 6–1, 1–6, [10–5]	(Romania) Ilona Georgiana Ghioroaie (Romania) Oana Georgeta Simion	(Burundi) Sada Nahimana; Darya Astakhova	(Romania) Miriam Bulgaru (Japan) Kurumi Nara (United States) Emma Navarro (Poland) Maja Chwalińska
July 18	President's Cup; Nur-Sultan, Kazakhstan; Hard; W60; Singles – Doubles	(Japan) Moyuka Uchijima; 6–3, 7–6^{(7–2)}	(Serbia) Natalija Stevanović	(South Korea) Han Na-lae; Sofya Lansere	Vitalia Diatchenko; Anastasia Zolotareva; Daria Kudashova; Mariia Tkacheva
July 18	President's Cup; Nur-Sultan, Kazakhstan; Hard; W60; Singles – Doubles	Mariia Tkacheva; Anastasia Zolotareva; 4–6, 6–1, [10–6]	(Japan) Momoko Kobori (Japan) Moyuka Uchijima	(South Korea) Han Na-lae; Sofya Lansere	Vitalia Diatchenko; Anastasia Zolotareva; Daria Kudashova; Mariia Tkacheva
July 18	Open Araba en Femenino; Vitoria-Gasteiz, Spain; Hard; W60; Singles – Doubles	(France) Jessika Ponchet; 6–4, 7–5	(Switzerland) Jenny Dürst	(Spain) Eva Guerrero Álvarez (Philippines) Alex Eala	(Switzerland) Susan Bandecchi (Hungary) Adrienn Nagy (Chinese Taipei) Liang En-shuo (United Kingdom) Eden Silva
July 18	Open Araba en Femenino; Vitoria-Gasteiz, Spain; Hard; W60; Singles – Doubles	Maria Bondarenko (Romania) Ioana Loredana Roșca; 4–6, 6–4, [11–9]	(Netherlands) Isabelle Haverlag (Lithuania) Justina Mikulskytė	(Spain) Eva Guerrero Álvarez (Philippines) Alex Eala	(Switzerland) Susan Bandecchi (Hungary) Adrienn Nagy (Chinese Taipei) Liang En-shuo (United Kingdom) Eden Silva
July 18	The Women's Hospital Classic; Evansville, United States; Hard; W60; Singles – Doubles	(United States) Ashlyn Krueger; 6–3, 7–5	(United States) Sachia Vickery	(United States) Catherine Harrison (United States) Elizabeth Mandlik	(Canada) Katherine Sebov (United States) Victoria Duval (Canada) Carol Zhao (United States) Katrina Scott
July 18	The Women's Hospital Classic; Evansville, United States; Hard; W60; Singles – Doubles	(United States) Kolie Allen (United States) Ava Markham; 3–6, 6–1, [10–3]	(United States) Kylie Collins (United States) Ashlyn Krueger	(United States) Catherine Harrison (United States) Elizabeth Mandlik	(Canada) Katherine Sebov (United States) Victoria Duval (Canada) Carol Zhao (United States) Katrina Scott
July 18	Saskatoon, Canada; Hard; W25; Singles and doubles draws	(Canada) Victoria Mboko; 6–2, 6–0	(United States) Madison Sieg	(United States) Elysia Bolton (United States) Hurricane Tyra Black	(Canada) Stacey Fung (United States) Jessie Aney (Canada) Teah Chavez (Canada) Marina Stakusic
July 18	Saskatoon, Canada; Hard; W25; Singles and doubles draws	(Canada) Kayla Cross (Canada) Marina Stakusic; 6–3, 7–6^{(7–4)}	(United States) Kendra Bunch (Serbia) Katarina Kozarov	(United States) Elysia Bolton (United States) Hurricane Tyra Black	(Canada) Stacey Fung (United States) Jessie Aney (Canada) Teah Chavez (Canada) Marina Stakusic
July 18	Darmstadt, Germany; Clay; W25; Singles and doubles draws	(Croatia) Antonia Ružić; 6–3, 6–2	Irina Khromacheva	Ekaterina Makarova (Spain) Jéssica Bouzas Maneiro	Julia Avdeeva (Greece) Sapfo Sakellaridi (France) Carole Monnet (Czech Republic) Anna Sisková
July 18	Darmstadt, Germany; Clay; W25; Singles and doubles draws	(Estonia) Elena Malõgina (France) Alice Robbe; 7–5, 7–5	(Spain) Jéssica Bouzas Maneiro (Spain) Leyre Romero Gormaz	Ekaterina Makarova (Spain) Jéssica Bouzas Maneiro	Julia Avdeeva (Greece) Sapfo Sakellaridi (France) Carole Monnet (Czech Republic) Anna Sisková
July 18	Perugia, Italy; Clay; W25; Singles and doubles draws	(France) Séléna Janicijevic; 6–2, 6–2	(Italy) Anna Turati	(Spain) Carlota Martínez Círez (France) Lucie Nguyen Tan	(Italy) Anastasia Grymalska (Spain) Ángela Fita Boluda (Ukraine) Valeriya Strakhova (Bosnia and Herzegovina) Nefisa Berberović
July 18	Perugia, Italy; Clay; W25; Singles and doubles draws	(Slovenia) Veronika Erjavec (Ukraine) Valeriya Strakhova; Walkover	(Spain) Ángela Fita Boluda (Italy) Angelica Moratelli	(Spain) Carlota Martínez Círez (France) Lucie Nguyen Tan	(Italy) Anastasia Grymalska (Spain) Ángela Fita Boluda (Ukraine) Valeriya Strakhova (Bosnia and Herzegovina) Nefisa Berberović
July 18	Figueira da Foz, Portugal; Hard; W25+H; Singles and doubles draws	(United States) Jamie Loeb; 7–5, 6–4	(Australia) Kimberly Birrell	(Sweden) Lisa Zaar (Turkey) Pemra Özgen	(South Africa) Isabella Kruger (United States) Ashley Lahey (United States) Jenna DeFalco (Thailand) Peangtarn Plipuech
July 18	Figueira da Foz, Portugal; Hard; W25+H; Singles and doubles draws	(Australia) Alexandra Bozovic (Portugal) Francisca Jorge; 6–2, 3–6, [12–10]	(Chinese Taipei) Lee Pei-chi (Chinese Taipei) Wu Fang-hsien	(Sweden) Lisa Zaar (Turkey) Pemra Özgen	(South Africa) Isabella Kruger (United States) Ashley Lahey (United States) Jenna DeFalco (Thailand) Peangtarn Plipuech
July 18	Caloundra, Australia; Hard; W15; Singles and doubles draws	(Australia) Talia Gibson; 7–6^{(7–4)}, 6–4	(Australia) Destanee Aiava	(Japan) Aoi Ito (Japan) Chisa Hosonuma	(New Zealand) Monique Barry (Australia) Alicia Smith (Australia) Mia Repac (Australia) Amy Stevens
July 18	Caloundra, Australia; Hard; W15; Singles and doubles draws	(New Zealand) Monique Barry (New Zealand) Vivian Yang; 6–2, 7–6^{(7–5)}	(Japan) Aoi Ito (Japan) Nanari Katsumi	(Japan) Aoi Ito (Japan) Chisa Hosonuma	(New Zealand) Monique Barry (Australia) Alicia Smith (Australia) Mia Repac (Australia) Amy Stevens
July 18	Les Contamines-Montjoie, France; Hard; W15; Singles and doubles draws	(France) Jenny Lim; 6–1, 7–6^{(10–8)}	(France) Nina Radovanovic	(Switzerland) Valentina Ryser (France) Théo Gravouil	(France) Chloé Noël (France) Astrid Lew Yan Foon (France) Marine Szostak (France) Élise Renard
July 18	Les Contamines-Montjoie, France; Hard; W15; Singles and doubles draws	(Switzerland) Naïma Karamoko (Switzerland) Valentina Ryser; 6–7^{(5–7)}, 6–2, [10–8]	(France) Marine Szostak (France) Lucie Wargnier	(Switzerland) Valentina Ryser (France) Théo Gravouil	(France) Chloé Noël (France) Astrid Lew Yan Foon (France) Marine Szostak (France) Élise Renard
July 18	Cancún, Mexico; Hard; W15; Singles and doubles draws	(Mexico) Lya Isabel Fernández Olivares; 6–3, 6–2	(France) Sophia Biolay	(Canada) Vanessa Wong (Mexico) Victoria Rodríguez	(Spain) Alicia Herrero Liñana (Colombia) María Camila Torres Murcia (Israel) Mika Dagan Fruchtman; Noel Saidenova
July 18	Cancún, Mexico; Hard; W15; Singles and doubles draws	(Japan) Hikaru Sato (Canada) Vanessa Wong; 6–2, 6–4	(Spain) Alicia Herrero Liñana (Argentina) Melany Krywoj	(Canada) Vanessa Wong (Mexico) Victoria Rodríguez	(Spain) Alicia Herrero Liñana (Colombia) María Camila Torres Murcia (Israel) Mika Dagan Fruchtman; Noel Saidenova
July 18	Monastir, Tunisia; Hard; W15; Singles and doubles draws	(Indonesia) Priska Madelyn Nugroho; 6–3, 1–6, 6–4	(India) Vaidehi Chaudhari	(Turkey) Zeynep Sönmez (South Korea) Back Da-yeon	(India) Jennifer Luikham (Japan) Michika Ozeki (France) Caroline Roméo (China) Wei Sijia
July 18	Monastir, Tunisia; Hard; W15; Singles and doubles draws	(Indonesia) Priska Madelyn Nugroho (China) Wei Sijia; 6–4, 6–1	(South Korea) Back Da-yeon (South Korea) Jeong Bo-young	(Turkey) Zeynep Sönmez (South Korea) Back Da-yeon	(India) Jennifer Luikham (Japan) Michika Ozeki (France) Caroline Roméo (China) Wei Sijia
July 25	Internazionali di Tennis del Friuli Venezia Giulia; Cordenons, Italy; Clay; W60; Singles – Doubles	(Hungary) Panna Udvardy; 6–2, 6–0	Elina Avanesyan	(Austria) Julia Grabher (Italy) Angelica Moratelli	(Germany) Katharina Gerlach (Spain) Marina Bassols Ribera (Czech Republic) Linda Fruhvirtová (Slovenia) Veronika Erjavec
July 25	Internazionali di Tennis del Friuli Venezia Giulia; Cordenons, Italy; Clay; W60; Singles – Doubles	(Italy) Angelica Moratelli (Netherlands) Eva Vedder; 6–3, 6–2	(Colombia) Yuliana Lizarazo (Italy) Aurora Zantedeschi	(Austria) Julia Grabher (Italy) Angelica Moratelli	(Germany) Katharina Gerlach (Spain) Marina Bassols Ribera (Czech Republic) Linda Fruhvirtová (Slovenia) Veronika Erjavec
July 25	Horb am Neckar, Germany; Clay; W25; Singles and doubles draws	Ekaterina Makarova; 6–1, 6–0	(Australia) Jaimee Fourlis	(Switzerland) Conny Perrin (Germany) Joëlle Steur	(Germany) Ella Seidel (Slovenia) Nina Potočnik (Greece) Sapfo Sakellaridi (France) Carole Monnet
July 25	Horb am Neckar, Germany; Clay; W25; Singles and doubles draws	Ekaterina Makarova; Ekaterina Reyngold; 2–6, 6–4, [10–8]	(Australia) Jaimee Fourlis (Australia) Alana Parnaby	(Switzerland) Conny Perrin (Germany) Joëlle Steur	(Germany) Ella Seidel (Slovenia) Nina Potočnik (Greece) Sapfo Sakellaridi (France) Carole Monnet
July 25	Open Castilla y León; El Espinar, Spain; Hard; W25; Singles and doubles draws	Mirra Andreeva; 6–4, 6–2	(Spain) Eva Guerrero Álvarez	(Latvia) Diāna Marcinkēviča (Philippines) Alex Eala	(United States) Ashley Lahey (Hong Kong) Cody Wong (Spain) Rosa Vicens Mas (France) Flavie Brugnone
July 25	Open Castilla y León; El Espinar, Spain; Hard; W25; Singles and doubles draws	(Hong Kong) Eudice Chong (Hong Kong) Cody Wong; 6–2, 4–6, [10–6]	(Spain) Marta González Encinas (Mexico) María Fernanda Navarro	(Latvia) Diāna Marcinkēviča (Philippines) Alex Eala	(United States) Ashley Lahey (Hong Kong) Cody Wong (Spain) Rosa Vicens Mas (France) Flavie Brugnone
July 25	Nottingham, United Kingdom; Hard; W25; Singles and doubles draws	(Australia) Priscilla Hon; 6–3, 3–6, 6–3	(United Kingdom) Maia Lumsden	(Switzerland) Jenny Dürst (United Kingdom) Amarni Banks	(Lithuania) Andrė Lukošiūtė (South Korea) Ku Yeon-woo (India) Ankita Raina (Chinese Taipei) Joanna Garland
July 25	Nottingham, United Kingdom; Hard; W25; Singles and doubles draws	(Chinese Taipei) Lee Pei-chi (Chinese Taipei) Wu Fang-hsien; 6–3, 6–2	(Netherlands) Jasmijn Gimbrère (Netherlands) Isabelle Haverlag	(Switzerland) Jenny Dürst (United Kingdom) Amarni Banks	(Lithuania) Andrė Lukošiūtė (South Korea) Ku Yeon-woo (India) Ankita Raina (Chinese Taipei) Joanna Garland
July 25	Dallas, United States; Hard; W25; Singles and doubles draws	(United States) Katrina Scott; 6–1, 6–0	(United States) Elvina Kalieva	(United States) Robin Anderson (United States) Hina Inoue	(United States) Alexa Glatch (United States) Clervie Ngounoue (United States) Peyton Stearns (United States) Hanna Chang
July 25	Dallas, United States; Hard; W25; Singles and doubles draws	Maria Kozyreva; Veronica Miroshnichenko; 6–4, 6–7^{(7–9)}, [10–5]	(United States) Jessie Aney (United States) Jessica Failla	(United States) Robin Anderson (United States) Hina Inoue	(United States) Alexa Glatch (United States) Clervie Ngounoue (United States) Peyton Stearns (United States) Hanna Chang
July 25	Caloundra, Australia; Hard; W15; Singles and doubles draws	(Australia) Talia Gibson; 6–4, 3–2, ret.	(Australia) Destanee Aiava	(Australia) Anja Nayar (Australia) Lily Fairclough	(Japan) Aoi Ito (Australia) Lily Taylor (Australia) Darina Kamenoff (Australia) Ashleigh Simes
July 25	Caloundra, Australia; Hard; W15; Singles and doubles draws	(Japan) Aoi Ito (Japan) Nanari Katsumi; 6–2, 6–2	(New Zealand) Monique Barry (Australia) Stefani Webb	(Australia) Anja Nayar (Australia) Lily Fairclough	(Japan) Aoi Ito (Australia) Lily Taylor (Australia) Darina Kamenoff (Australia) Ashleigh Simes
July 25	Kottingbrunn, Austria; Clay; W15; Singles and doubles draws	(France) Manon Arcangioli; 0–6, 6–4, 6–0	(Italy) Dalila Spiteri	(Czech Republic) Linda Klimovičová (France) Tiphanie Fiquet	(Italy) Alessandra Mazzola (Hungary) Amarissa Kiara Tóth (Switzerland) Bojana Klincov (Italy) Federica Bilardo
July 25	Kottingbrunn, Austria; Clay; W15; Singles and doubles draws	(Hungary) Amarissa Kiara Tóth (Turkey) Doğa Türkmen; Walkover	(Chile) Fernanda Labraña (Italy) Dalila Spiteri	(Czech Republic) Linda Klimovičová (France) Tiphanie Fiquet	(Italy) Alessandra Mazzola (Hungary) Amarissa Kiara Tóth (Switzerland) Bojana Klincov (Italy) Federica Bilardo
July 25	Vejle, Denmark; Clay; W15; Singles and doubles draws	(Denmark) Johanne Svendsen; 6–1, 6–0	(Denmark) Hannah Viller Møller	(Netherlands) Anouck Vrancken Peeters (Germany) Angelina Wirges	(Canada) Jessica Luisa Alsola (Germany) Natalia Siedliska (Finland) Ella Haavisto (New Zealand) Valentina Ivanov
July 25	Vejle, Denmark; Clay; W15; Singles and doubles draws	(New Zealand) Valentina Ivanov (Denmark) Hannah Viller Møller; 6–2, 7–6^{(7–4)}	(Lithuania) Klaudija Bubelytė (Lithuania) Patricija Paukštytė	(Netherlands) Anouck Vrancken Peeters (Germany) Angelina Wirges	(Canada) Jessica Luisa Alsola (Germany) Natalia Siedliska (Finland) Ella Haavisto (New Zealand) Valentina Ivanov
July 25	Monastir, Tunisia; Hard; W15; Singles and doubles draws	(Indonesia) Priska Madelyn Nugroho; 6–2, 6–1	Anastasiia Gureva	(France) Caroline Roméo (Greece) Michaela Laki	(China) Wei Sijia (Czech Republic) Zdena Šafářová (Japan) Michika Ozeki (China) Yao Xinxin
July 25	Monastir, Tunisia; Hard; W15; Singles and doubles draws	(Indonesia) Priska Madelyn Nugroho (China) Wei Sijia; 6–2, 4–6, [10–5]	Anastasiia Gureva (Greece) Michaela Laki	(France) Caroline Roméo (Greece) Michaela Laki	(China) Wei Sijia (Czech Republic) Zdena Šafářová (Japan) Michika Ozeki (China) Yao Xinxin

=== August ===
Week of	Tournament	Winner	Runners-up	Semifinalists	Quarterfinalists
August 1	Polish Open; Grodzisk Mazowiecki, Poland; Hard; W100; Singles – Doubles	(Czech Republic) Kateřina Siniaková; 6–4, 6–1	(Poland) Magda Linette	(Bulgaria) Viktoriya Tomova (Serbia) Natalija Stevanović	(Slovakia) Viktória Kužmová (Poland) Katarzyna Kawa (Uzbekistan) Nigina Abduraimova; Kristina Dmitruk
August 1	Polish Open; Grodzisk Mazowiecki, Poland; Hard; W100; Singles – Doubles	(United Kingdom) Alicia Barnett (United Kingdom) Olivia Nicholls; 6–1, 7–6^{(7–3)}	(Germany) Vivian Heisen (Poland) Katarzyna Kawa	(Bulgaria) Viktoriya Tomova (Serbia) Natalija Stevanović	(Slovakia) Viktória Kužmová (Poland) Katarzyna Kawa (Uzbekistan) Nigina Abduraimova; Kristina Dmitruk
August 1	Ladies Open Hechingen; Hechingen, Germany; Clay; W60; Singles – Doubles	(Croatia) Lea Bošković; 7–5, 3–6, 6–4	(Germany) Noma Noha Akugue	(Greece) Sapfo Sakellaridi (Czech Republic) Michaela Bayerlová	(Bulgaria) Julia Terziyska (United States) Vivian Wolff (Germany) Mona Barthel (Austria) Sinja Kraus
August 1	Ladies Open Hechingen; Hechingen, Germany; Clay; W60; Singles – Doubles	Irina Khromacheva; Diana Shnaider; 6–2, 6–3	(Serbia) Tamara Čurović (United States) Chiara Scholl	(Greece) Sapfo Sakellaridi (Czech Republic) Michaela Bayerlová	(Bulgaria) Julia Terziyska (United States) Vivian Wolff (Germany) Mona Barthel (Austria) Sinja Kraus
August 1	ITF World Tennis Tour Gran Canaria; San Bartolomé de Tirajana, Spain; Clay; W60; Singles – Doubles	(Netherlands) Arantxa Rus; 6–3, 3–6, 6–1	Polina Kudermetova	(France) Carole Monnet (Serbia) Lola Radivojević	(Spain) Irene Burillo Escorihuela (Spain) Leyre Romero Gormaz (Spain) Ángela Fita Boluda (Chinese Taipei) Liang En-shuo
August 1	ITF World Tennis Tour Gran Canaria; San Bartolomé de Tirajana, Spain; Clay; W60; Singles – Doubles	(Spain) Jéssica Bouzas Maneiro (Spain) Leyre Romero Gormaz; 1–6, 7–5, [10–6]	(Spain) Lucía Cortez Llorca (Spain) Rosa Vicens Mas	(France) Carole Monnet (Serbia) Lola Radivojević	(Spain) Irene Burillo Escorihuela (Spain) Leyre Romero Gormaz (Spain) Ángela Fita Boluda (Chinese Taipei) Liang En-shuo
August 1	Lexington Challenger; Lexington, United States; Hard; W60; Singles – Doubles	(United Kingdom) Katie Swan; 6–0, 3–6, 6–3	(United Kingdom) Jodie Burrage	(Mexico) Marcela Zacarías (United States) Peyton Stearns	(United States) Taylor Ng; Veronica Miroshnichenko (India) Karman Thandi (United States) Hanna Chang
August 1	Lexington Challenger; Lexington, United States; Hard; W60; Singles – Doubles	(Indonesia) Aldila Sutjiadi (Ukraine) Kateryna Volodko; 7–5, 6–3	(United States) Jada Hart (United States) Dalayna Hewitt	(Mexico) Marcela Zacarías (United States) Peyton Stearns	(United States) Taylor Ng; Veronica Miroshnichenko (India) Karman Thandi (United States) Hanna Chang
August 1	Eupen, Belgium; Clay; W25; Singles and doubles draws	(Czech Republic) Aneta Kučmová; 7–5, 6–4	(Belgium) Marie Benoît	(Argentina) Julia Riera (Sweden) Caijsa Hennemann	(Turkey) Çağla Büyükakçay (Hungary) Fanny Stollár (Italy) Anna Turati (Malta) Francesca Curmi
August 1	Eupen, Belgium; Clay; W25; Singles and doubles draws	(Czech Republic) Aneta Kučmová (Japan) Misaki Matsuda; 7–6^{(7–5)}, 6–3	(Chile) Fernanda Labraña (Italy) Anna Turati	(Argentina) Julia Riera (Sweden) Caijsa Hennemann	(Turkey) Çağla Büyükakçay (Hungary) Fanny Stollár (Italy) Anna Turati (Malta) Francesca Curmi
August 1	Rio de Janeiro, Brazil; Clay; W25; Singles and doubles draws	(Brazil) Gabriela Cé; 4–6, 7–5, 6–3	(Bolivia) Noelia Zeballos	(Brazil) Thaisa Grana Pedretti (India) Riya Bhatia	(Colombia) María Paulina Pérez (Brazil) Camilla Bossi (Peru) Romina Ccuno (Mexico) Ana Sofía Sánchez
August 1	Rio de Janeiro, Brazil; Clay; W25; Singles and doubles draws	(Brazil) Thaisa Grana Pedretti (Bolivia) Noelia Zeballos; 6–3, 6–1	(India) Riya Bhatia (Colombia) María Paulina Pérez	(Brazil) Thaisa Grana Pedretti (India) Riya Bhatia	(Colombia) María Paulina Pérez (Brazil) Camilla Bossi (Peru) Romina Ccuno (Mexico) Ana Sofía Sánchez
August 1	Agadir, Morocco; Clay; W25; Singles and doubles draws	(Bulgaria) Gergana Topalova; 2–6, 6–2, 6–3	(Italy) Angelica Moratelli	Ekaterina Reyngold (Netherlands) Lexie Stevens	(Spain) Carlota Martínez Círez (United Kingdom) Emilie Lindh (Egypt) Sandra Samir (Italy) Aurora Zantedeschi
August 1	Agadir, Morocco; Clay; W25; Singles and doubles draws	(Italy) Angelica Moratelli (Italy) Aurora Zantedeschi; 6–2, 4–6, [10–7]	(Sweden) Jacqueline Cabaj Awad (Italy) Martina Colmegna	Ekaterina Reyngold (Netherlands) Lexie Stevens	(Spain) Carlota Martínez Círez (United Kingdom) Emilie Lindh (Egypt) Sandra Samir (Italy) Aurora Zantedeschi
August 1	Foxhills, United Kingdom; Hard (indoor); W25; Singles and doubles draws	(Chinese Taipei) Joanna Garland; 3–6, 6–1, 6–2	(Japan) Kyōka Okamura	(Italy) Lucrezia Stefanini (Austria) Tamira Paszek	(Serbia) Katarina Jokić (China) Xun Fangying (United Kingdom) Alice Gillan (United Kingdom) Naiktha Bains
August 1	Foxhills, United Kingdom; Hard (indoor); W25; Singles and doubles draws	(United Kingdom) Freya Christie (United Kingdom) Ali Collins; 6–3, 6–3	(United Kingdom) Naiktha Bains (United Kingdom) Maia Lumsden	(Italy) Lucrezia Stefanini (Austria) Tamira Paszek	(Serbia) Katarina Jokić (China) Xun Fangying (United Kingdom) Alice Gillan (United Kingdom) Naiktha Bains
August 1	Kottingbrunn, Austria; Clay; W15; Singles and doubles draws	(Hungary) Amarissa Kiara Tóth; 6–3, 7–5	(Germany) Carolina Kuhl	(Bosnia and Herzegovina) Laura Radaković (Austria) Tamara Kostic	(Serbia) Andrea Obradović (Georgia (country)) Nino Natsvlishvili (Italy) Laura Mair; Ksenia Zaytseva
August 1	Kottingbrunn, Austria; Clay; W15; Singles and doubles draws	(Czech Republic) Karolína Kubáňová (Czech Republic) Ivana Šebestová; 6–4, 6–0	(Czech Republic) Linda Ševčíková (Czech Republic) Karolína Vlčková	(Bosnia and Herzegovina) Laura Radaković (Austria) Tamara Kostic	(Serbia) Andrea Obradović (Georgia (country)) Nino Natsvlishvili (Italy) Laura Mair; Ksenia Zaytseva
August 1	Frederiksberg, Denmark; Clay; W15; Singles and doubles draws	(Denmark) Rebecca Munk Mortensen; 5–7, 6–1, 6–3	(Canada) Jessica Luisa Alsola	(Lithuania) Klaudija Bubelytė (Netherlands) Anouck Vrancken Peeters	(Spain) Lucía Martínez Gómez (New Zealand) Valentina Ivanov (United Kingdom) Eleanor Baglow (Sweden) Kajsa Rinaldo Persson
August 1	Frederiksberg, Denmark; Clay; W15; Singles and doubles draws	(Canada) Jessica Luisa Alsola (Denmark) Johanne Svendsen; 6–4, 3–6, [10–7]	(Denmark) Vilma Krebs Hyllested (Denmark) Rebecca Munk Mortensen	(Lithuania) Klaudija Bubelytė (Netherlands) Anouck Vrancken Peeters	(Spain) Lucía Martínez Gómez (New Zealand) Valentina Ivanov (United Kingdom) Eleanor Baglow (Sweden) Kajsa Rinaldo Persson
August 1	Savitaipale, Finland; Clay; W15; Singles and doubles draws	(Germany) Antonia Schmidt; 7–5, 6–2	(Italy) Miriana Tona	(Belgium) Vicky Van de Peer (Slovakia) Timea Jarušková	(Finland) Laura Hietaranta (Estonia) Anet Angelika Koskel (Poland) Weronika Baszak (Germany) Emily Welker
August 1	Savitaipale, Finland; Clay; W15; Singles and doubles draws	(Estonia) Anet Angelika Koskel (Estonia) Katriin Saar; 5–7, 6–3, [10–2]	(Italy) Miriana Tona (Bulgaria) Ani Vangelova	(Belgium) Vicky Van de Peer (Slovakia) Timea Jarušková	(Finland) Laura Hietaranta (Estonia) Anet Angelika Koskel (Poland) Weronika Baszak (Germany) Emily Welker
August 1	Pescara, Italy; Clay; W15; Singles and doubles draws	(Italy) Anastasia Grymalska; 6–3, 3–6, 6–3	(Italy) Tatiana Pieri	(Italy) Federica Bilardo (Italy) Giulia Crescenzi	(Italy) Giorgia Pinto (Italy) Beatrice Ricci; Evialina Laskevich (Italy) Jessica Bertoldo
August 1	Pescara, Italy; Clay; W15; Singles and doubles draws	(Italy) Anastasia Grymalska (Germany) Anne Schäfer; 5–7, 6–1, [12–10]	(Italy) Giorgia Pinto (Italy) Gaia Squarcialupi	(Italy) Federica Bilardo (Italy) Giulia Crescenzi	(Italy) Giorgia Pinto (Italy) Beatrice Ricci; Evialina Laskevich (Italy) Jessica Bertoldo
August 1	Monastir, Tunisia; Hard; W15; Singles and doubles draws	(China) Wei Sijia; 4–6, 7–6^{(7–3)}, 6–4	(China) Yao Xinxin	(India) Jennifer Luikham; Anastasiia Gureva	(China) Che Yujiao (Italy) Maria Vittoria Viviani (Australia) Lisa Mays (Ukraine) Marianna Zakarlyuk
August 1	Monastir, Tunisia; Hard; W15; Singles and doubles draws	(Japan) Saki Imamura (Indonesia) Priska Madelyn Nugroho; 6–3, 6–2	(France) Nina Radovanovic (China) Yao Xinxin	(India) Jennifer Luikham; Anastasiia Gureva	(China) Che Yujiao (Italy) Maria Vittoria Viviani (Australia) Lisa Mays (Ukraine) Marianna Zakarlyuk
August 8	Koser Jewelers Tennis Challenge; Landisville, United States; Hard; W100; Singles – Doubles	(China) Zhu Lin; 6–2, 6–3	(United States) Elizabeth Mandlik	(South Korea) Han Na-lae (Switzerland) Simona Waltert	(United States) Robin Anderson (United States) Caroline Dolehide (Netherlands) Lesley Pattinama Kerkhove (Poland) Katarzyna Kawa
August 8	Koser Jewelers Tennis Challenge; Landisville, United States; Hard; W100; Singles – Doubles	(United States) Sophie Chang (Kazakhstan) Anna Danilina; 2–6, 7–6^{(7–4)}, [11–9]	(South Korea) Han Na-lae (South Korea) Jang Su-jeong	(South Korea) Han Na-lae (Switzerland) Simona Waltert	(United States) Robin Anderson (United States) Caroline Dolehide (Netherlands) Lesley Pattinama Kerkhove (Poland) Katarzyna Kawa
August 8	ITF World Tennis Tour Maspalomas; San Bartolomé de Tirajana, Spain; Clay; W60; Singles – Doubles	(Austria) Julia Grabher; 6–4, 6–3	(Argentina) Nadia Podoroska	Polina Kudermetova (Netherlands) Suzan Lamens	(Netherlands) Arantxa Rus; Diana Shnaider (Czech Republic) Barbora Palicová (Spain) Jéssica Bouzas Maneiro
August 8	ITF World Tennis Tour Maspalomas; San Bartolomé de Tirajana, Spain; Clay; W60; Singles – Doubles	(Spain) Ángela Fita Boluda (Netherlands) Arantxa Rus; 6–4, 6–4	Elina Avanesyan; Diana Shnaider	Polina Kudermetova (Netherlands) Suzan Lamens	(Netherlands) Arantxa Rus; Diana Shnaider (Czech Republic) Barbora Palicová (Spain) Jéssica Bouzas Maneiro
August 8	Koksijde, Belgium; Clay; W25; Singles and doubles draws	(Belgium) Marie Benoît; 7–5, 6–3	(Argentina) Julia Riera	(Italy) Anna Turati (Latvia) Daniela Vismane	(Belgium) Amelia Waligora (Belgium) Amelie Van Impe (Belgium) Magali Kempen (Belgium) Lara Salden
August 8	Koksijde, Belgium; Clay; W25; Singles and doubles draws	(Belgium) Magali Kempen (Belgium) Lara Salden; 6–2, 6–2	(Belgium) Amelie Van Impe (Belgium) Hanne Vandewinkel	(Italy) Anna Turati (Latvia) Daniela Vismane	(Belgium) Amelia Waligora (Belgium) Amelie Van Impe (Belgium) Magali Kempen (Belgium) Lara Salden
August 8	Pärnu, Estonia; Clay; W25; Singles and doubles draws	(Poland) Weronika Falkowska; 7–5, 6–2	(Bulgaria) Gergana Topalova	(Estonia) Elena Malõgina (Lithuania) Justina Mikulskytė	(Czech Republic) Anna Sisková (Italy) Martina Colmegna (Netherlands) Merel Hoedt (Czech Republic) Michaela Bayerlová
August 8	Pärnu, Estonia; Clay; W25; Singles and doubles draws	(Lithuania) Justina Mikulskytė (Ukraine) Valeriya Strakhova; 6–2, 4–6, [10–8]	(Greece) Eleni Christofi (Bulgaria) Gergana Topalova	(Estonia) Elena Malõgina (Lithuania) Justina Mikulskytė	(Czech Republic) Anna Sisková (Italy) Martina Colmegna (Netherlands) Merel Hoedt (Czech Republic) Michaela Bayerlová
August 8	Leipzig, Germany; Clay; W25+H; Singles and doubles draws	(Slovenia) Nina Potočnik; 4–6, 6–2, 7–5	(Germany) Mara Guth	(United States) Chiara Scholl (Germany) Julia Middendorf	(Latvia) Diāna Marcinkēviča (Germany) Ella Seidel (Germany) Katharina Hobgarski (Germany) Anna Klasen
August 8	Leipzig, Germany; Clay; W25+H; Singles and doubles draws	(Germany) Noma Noha Akugue (Germany) Ella Seidel; 6–0, 7–5	(Germany) Tea Lukic (Germany) Joëlle Steur	(United States) Chiara Scholl (Germany) Julia Middendorf	(Latvia) Diāna Marcinkēviča (Germany) Ella Seidel (Germany) Katharina Hobgarski (Germany) Anna Klasen
August 8	Ust-Kamenogorsk, Kazakhstan; Hard; W25; Singles and doubles draws	Anna Kubareva; 6–4, 7–6^{(8–6)}	Tatiana Barkova	(Kazakhstan) Gozal Ainitdinova; Daria Kudashova	Ekaterina Kazionova (India) Ashmitha Easwaramurthi; Darya Shauha; Ekaterina Yashina
August 8	Ust-Kamenogorsk, Kazakhstan; Hard; W25; Singles and doubles draws	Ekaterina Maklakova; Aleksandra Pospelova; 7–6^{(7–5)}, 6–1	Ekaterina Kazionova (Kazakhstan) Zhibek Kulambayeva	(Kazakhstan) Gozal Ainitdinova; Daria Kudashova	Ekaterina Kazionova (India) Ashmitha Easwaramurthi; Darya Shauha; Ekaterina Yashina
August 8	Radom, Poland; Clay; W25; Singles and doubles draws	(Turkey) Çağla Büyükakçay; 4–1, ret.	Vera Lapko	(Spain) Carlota Martínez Círez (Slovenia) Veronika Erjavec	(Italy) Lucrezia Stefanini (France) Estelle Cascino (Slovakia) Bianca Behúlová (Czech Republic) Dominika Šalková
August 8	Radom, Poland; Clay; W25; Singles and doubles draws	(Czech Republic) Denisa Hindová (Czech Republic) Karolína Kubáňová; 6–1, 6–2	(Japan) Funa Kozaki (Turkey) İlay Yörük	(Spain) Carlota Martínez Círez (Slovenia) Veronika Erjavec	(Italy) Lucrezia Stefanini (France) Estelle Cascino (Slovakia) Bianca Behúlová (Czech Republic) Dominika Šalková
August 8	Brașov, Romania; Clay; W25; Singles and doubles draws	(Romania) Andreea Roșca; 6–1, 6–7^{(5–7)}, 7–6^{(7–1)}	Julia Avdeeva	(Romania) Cristina Dinu (Romania) Ilona Georgiana Ghioroaie	(Romania) Miriam Bulgaru (Romania) Georgia Crăciun (Romania) Ștefania Bojica (Romania) Oana Georgeta Simion
August 8	Brașov, Romania; Clay; W25; Singles and doubles draws	(Romania) Ilona Georgiana Ghioroaie (Romania) Oana Georgeta Simion; 7–5, 6–3	(Romania) Cristina Dinu (Romania) Andreea Roșca	(Romania) Cristina Dinu (Romania) Ilona Georgiana Ghioroaie	(Romania) Miriam Bulgaru (Romania) Georgia Crăciun (Romania) Ștefania Bojica (Romania) Oana Georgeta Simion
August 8	Danderyd, Sweden; Clay; W25; Singles and doubles draws	(Czech Republic) Brenda Fruhvirtová; 6–1, 6–3	(Germany) Mona Barthel	(Sweden) Lisa Zaar (Denmark) Sofia Samavati	(Slovakia) Alica Rusová (Germany) Natalia Siedliska (Sweden) Jacqueline Cabaj Awad (Greece) Sapfo Sakellaridi
August 8	Danderyd, Sweden; Clay; W25; Singles and doubles draws	(Japan) Rina Saigo (Japan) Yukina Saigo; 2–6, 7–5, [10–7]	(United States) Ashley Lahey (Sweden) Lisa Zaar	(Sweden) Lisa Zaar (Denmark) Sofia Samavati	(Slovakia) Alica Rusová (Germany) Natalia Siedliska (Sweden) Jacqueline Cabaj Awad (Greece) Sapfo Sakellaridi
August 8	Cairo, Egypt; Clay; W15; Singles and doubles draws	Elena Pridankina; 6–1, 6–1	(Romania) Alexandra Iordache	(Japan) Mayuka Aikawa (Egypt) Yasmin Ezzat	(Sweden) Louise Brunskog (Bulgaria) Ani Vangelova (Egypt) Amira Badawi (Egypt) Aya El Sayed
August 8	Cairo, Egypt; Clay; W15; Singles and doubles draws	(Egypt) Yasmin Ezzat (Greece) Dimitra Pavlou; 6–4, 2–6, [12–10]	(Sweden) Vanessa Ersöz (Ukraine) Anastasiia Poplavska	(Japan) Mayuka Aikawa (Egypt) Yasmin Ezzat	(Sweden) Louise Brunskog (Bulgaria) Ani Vangelova (Egypt) Amira Badawi (Egypt) Aya El Sayed
August 8	Padova, Italy; Clay; W15; Singles and doubles draws	(Italy) Federica Bilardo; 6–2, 6–1	(Italy) Laura Mair	(Italy) Alessandra Mazzola (Slovakia) Irina Balus	(Italy) Virginia Ferrara (Italy) Beatrice Ricci (France) Laïa Petretic (Italy) Giulia Crescenzi
August 8	Padova, Italy; Clay; W15; Singles and doubles draws	(Italy) Virginia Ferrara (Italy) Giorgia Pedone; 6–3, 6–4	(Italy) Jessica Bertoldo (Italy) Enola Chiesa	(Italy) Alessandra Mazzola (Slovakia) Irina Balus	(Italy) Virginia Ferrara (Italy) Beatrice Ricci (France) Laïa Petretic (Italy) Giulia Crescenzi
August 8	Cancún, Mexico; Hard; W15; Singles and doubles draws	(United States) Eryn Cayetano; 6–2, 6–2	(Mexico) Lya Isabel Fernández Olivares	(Mexico) Victoria Rodríguez (United States) Carolyn Ansari	(United States) Paris Corley (Moldova) Abigail Rencheli (Guatemala) Gabriela Rivera (Colombia) María Paulina Pérez
August 8	Cancún, Mexico; Hard; W15; Singles and doubles draws	(South Africa) Gabriella Broadfoot (Moldova) Abigail Rencheli; 6–5, ret.	(Japan) Mao Mushika (Japan) Mio Mushika	(Mexico) Victoria Rodríguez (United States) Carolyn Ansari	(United States) Paris Corley (Moldova) Abigail Rencheli (Guatemala) Gabriela Rivera (Colombia) María Paulina Pérez
August 8	Monastir, Tunisia; Hard; W15; Singles and doubles draws	(Indonesia) Priska Madelyn Nugroho; 6–0, 6–3	(Japan) Saki Imamura	(Japan) Naho Sato (China) Yao Xinxin	(China) Li Zongyu (Belgium) Clara Vlasselaer (Australia) Lisa Mays (Slovenia) Ela Nala Milić
August 8	Monastir, Tunisia; Hard; W15; Singles and doubles draws	(Japan) Saki Imamura (Indonesia) Priska Madelyn Nugroho; 6–1, 6–3	(France) Yasmine Mansouri (Japan) Naho Sato	(Japan) Naho Sato (China) Yao Xinxin	(China) Li Zongyu (Belgium) Clara Vlasselaer (Australia) Lisa Mays (Slovenia) Ela Nala Milić
August 15	Bronx Open; The Bronx, United States; Hard; W60; Singles – Doubles	Kamilla Rakhimova; 6–2, 6–3	(Sweden) Mirjam Björklund	Erika Andreeva (Switzerland) Simona Waltert	Oksana Selekhmeteva (Spain) Cristina Bucșa; Anastasia Gasanova (Ukraine) Daria Snigur
August 15	Bronx Open; The Bronx, United States; Hard; W60; Singles – Doubles	Anna Blinkova (Switzerland) Simona Waltert; 6–3, 6–3	(South Korea) Han Na-lae (Japan) Hiroko Kuwata	Erika Andreeva (Switzerland) Simona Waltert	Oksana Selekhmeteva (Spain) Cristina Bucșa; Anastasia Gasanova (Ukraine) Daria Snigur
August 15	Mogyoród, Hungary; Clay; W25; Singles and doubles draws	(Czech Republic) Brenda Fruhvirtová; 6–0, 6–0	(Germany) Luisa Meyer auf der Heide	(Romania) Miriam Bulgaru (Hungary) Natália Szabanin	(Argentina) Julia Riera (Slovakia) Rebecca Šramková (Italy) Giulia Gatto-Monticone (Mexico) Ana Sofía Sánchez
August 15	Mogyoród, Hungary; Clay; W25; Singles and doubles draws	(Romania) Ilona Georgiana Ghioroaie (Hungary) Amarissa Kiara Tóth; 7–5, 6–0	(France) Carole Monnet (France) Marine Partaud	(Romania) Miriam Bulgaru (Hungary) Natália Szabanin	(Argentina) Julia Riera (Slovakia) Rebecca Šramková (Italy) Giulia Gatto-Monticone (Mexico) Ana Sofía Sánchez
August 15	Vrnjačka Banja, Serbia; Clay; W25; Singles and doubles draws	(Serbia) Mia Ristić; 0–6, 7–5, 7–5	(Romania) Cristina Dinu	(Burundi) Sada Nahimana; Evialina Laskevich	(Bulgaria) Lia Karatancheva (Netherlands) Lexie Stevens (Greece) Michaela Laki (Italy) Lisa Pigato
August 15	Vrnjačka Banja, Serbia; Clay; W25; Singles and doubles draws	(Romania) Cristina Dinu (Ukraine) Valeriya Strakhova; 6–1, 4–6, [10–8]	(United Kingdom) Emily Appleton (India) Prarthana Thombare	(Burundi) Sada Nahimana; Evialina Laskevich	(Bulgaria) Lia Karatancheva (Netherlands) Lexie Stevens (Greece) Michaela Laki (Italy) Lisa Pigato
August 15	Ourense, Spain; Hard; W25; Singles and doubles draws	Kristina Dmitruk; 7–5, 6–1	(Bosnia and Herzegovina) Nefisa Berberović	(Portugal) Francisca Jorge (Spain) Jéssica Bouzas Maneiro	(Netherlands) Arantxa Rus (Spain) Yvonne Cavallé Reimers (China) You Xiaodi (United Kingdom) Anna Brogan
August 15	Ourense, Spain; Hard; W25; Singles and doubles draws	(United States) Maria Mateas (Netherlands) Arantxa Rus; 6–4, 5–7, [10–7]	(Spain) Yvonne Cavallé Reimers (Spain) Lucía Cortez Llorca	(Portugal) Francisca Jorge (Spain) Jéssica Bouzas Maneiro	(Netherlands) Arantxa Rus (Spain) Yvonne Cavallé Reimers (China) You Xiaodi (United Kingdom) Anna Brogan
August 15	Aldershot, United Kingdom; Hard; W25; Singles and doubles draws	(Chinese Taipei) Joanna Garland; 6–2, 6–4	(India) Ankita Raina	(Austria) Tamira Paszek (Japan) Haruka Kaji	(Germany) Anna-Lena Friedsam (Chinese Taipei) Liang En-shuo (United Kingdom) Amarni Banks (United Kingdom) Naiktha Bains
August 15	Aldershot, United Kingdom; Hard; W25; Singles and doubles draws	(United Kingdom) Freya Christie (United Kingdom) Ali Collins; 6–4, 6–2	(Lithuania) Andrė Lukošiūtė (United Kingdom) Eliz Maloney	(Austria) Tamira Paszek (Japan) Haruka Kaji	(Germany) Anna-Lena Friedsam (Chinese Taipei) Liang En-shuo (United Kingdom) Amarni Banks (United Kingdom) Naiktha Bains
August 15	Bad Waltersdorf, Austria; Clay; W15; Singles and doubles draws	Polina Leykina; 6–2, 6–3	(Slovenia) Pia Lovrič	(Romania) Karola Bejenaru (France) Tiphanie Fiquet	(Austria) Elena Karner (Switzerland) Katerina Tsygourova (Austria) Arabella Koller (Italy) Costanza Traversi
August 15	Bad Waltersdorf, Austria; Clay; W15; Singles and doubles draws	Ekaterina Ovcharenko (Czech Republic) Zdena Šafářová; 6–1, 6–3	(Hungary) Panna Bartha (Romania) Ștefania Bojica	(Romania) Karola Bejenaru (France) Tiphanie Fiquet	(Austria) Elena Karner (Switzerland) Katerina Tsygourova (Austria) Arabella Koller (Italy) Costanza Traversi
August 15	Duffel, Belgium; Clay; W15; Singles and doubles draws	(Belgium) Vicky Van de Peer; 6–0, 6–3	(Belgium) Hanne Vandewinkel	(France) Léa Tholey (Belgium) Axana Mareen	(United Kingdom) Matilda Mutavdzic (Belgium) Amelie Van Impe (Italy) Giulia Crescenzi (Japan) Miharu Imanishi
August 15	Duffel, Belgium; Clay; W15; Singles and doubles draws	(Italy) Giulia Crescenzi; Anastasia Sukhotina; 6–4, 3–6, [10–8]	(Belgium) Amelie Van Impe (Belgium) Hanne Vandewinkel	(France) Léa Tholey (Belgium) Axana Mareen	(United Kingdom) Matilda Mutavdzic (Belgium) Amelie Van Impe (Italy) Giulia Crescenzi (Japan) Miharu Imanishi
August 15	Cairo, Egypt; Clay; W15; Singles and doubles draws	(Italy) Gaia Squarcialupi; 6–4, 6–3	(Japan) Mayuka Aikawa	(Sweden) Vanessa Ersöz (Egypt) Amira Badawi	Elena Pridankina (Bulgaria) Ani Vangelova (Italy) Beatrice Stagno (Sweden) Louise Brunskog
August 15	Cairo, Egypt; Clay; W15; Singles and doubles draws	(Egypt) Yasmin Ezzat (Greece) Dimitra Pavlou; 7–5, 6–3	Elena Pridankina; Elizaveta Shebekina	(Sweden) Vanessa Ersöz (Egypt) Amira Badawi	Elena Pridankina (Bulgaria) Ani Vangelova (Italy) Beatrice Stagno (Sweden) Louise Brunskog
August 15	Erwitte, Germany; Clay; W15; Singles and doubles draws	(Germany) Julia Middendorf; 3–6, 6–3, 6–4	(Greece) Martha Matoula	(United States) Chiara Scholl (Germany) Joëlle Steur	(Germany) Fabienne Gettwart (Germany) Katharina Hering (Germany) Anna Klasen (Romania) Arina Vasilescu
August 15	Erwitte, Germany; Clay; W15; Singles and doubles draws	(Japan) Lisa-Marie Rioux (United States) Chiara Scholl; 6–7^{(5–7)}, 6–1, [10–7]	(Greece) Martha Matoula (Romania) Arina Vasilescu	(United States) Chiara Scholl (Germany) Joëlle Steur	(Germany) Fabienne Gettwart (Germany) Katharina Hering (Germany) Anna Klasen (Romania) Arina Vasilescu
August 15	Cancún, Mexico; Hard; W15; Singles and doubles draws	(Argentina) Solana Sierra; 2–6, 6–3, 7–6^{(9–7)}	(China) Han Jiangxue	(United States) Salma Ewing (Germany) Jantje Tilbürger	(United States) Kariann Pierre-Louis (Mexico) Victoria Rodríguez (United States) Paris Corley (Moldova) Abigail Rencheli
August 15	Cancún, Mexico; Hard; W15; Singles and doubles draws	(United States) Paris Corley (Argentina) Melany Krywoj; 7–6^{(8–6)}, 6–3	(Japan) Mao Mushika (Japan) Mio Mushika	(United States) Salma Ewing (Germany) Jantje Tilbürger	(United States) Kariann Pierre-Louis (Mexico) Victoria Rodríguez (United States) Paris Corley (Moldova) Abigail Rencheli
August 15	Eindhoven, Netherlands; Clay; W15; Singles and doubles draws	(Estonia) Maileen Nuudi; 6–3, 7–5	(Netherlands) Anouck Vrancken Peeters	(Netherlands) Merel Hoedt (Netherlands) Anouk Koevermans	(Netherlands) Demi Tran (Netherlands) Lian Tran (Latvia) Anna Ozerova (Romania) Oana Gavrilă
August 15	Eindhoven, Netherlands; Clay; W15; Singles and doubles draws	(Lithuania) Patricija Paukštytė (France) Laïa Petretic; 4–6, 7–5, [11–9]	(Netherlands) Demi Tran (Netherlands) Lian Tran	(Netherlands) Merel Hoedt (Netherlands) Anouk Koevermans	(Netherlands) Demi Tran (Netherlands) Lian Tran (Latvia) Anna Ozerova (Romania) Oana Gavrilă
August 15	Bydgoszcz, Poland; Clay; W15; Singles and doubles draws	Valeriia Olianovskaia; 6–3, 6–1	(Czech Republic) Linda Klimovičová	(Ukraine) Yelyzaveta Kotliar (Slovakia) Katarína Kužmová	(Czech Republic) Julie Štruplová (Czech Republic) Denisa Hindová (Poland) Weronika Ewald (Romania) Ilinca Amariei
August 15	Bydgoszcz, Poland; Clay; W15; Singles and doubles draws	(Ukraine) Maryna Kolb (Ukraine) Nadiya Kolb; 6–4, 1–6, [10–7]	Valeriia Olianovskaia (Poland) Stefania Rogozińska Dzik	(Ukraine) Yelyzaveta Kotliar (Slovakia) Katarína Kužmová	(Czech Republic) Julie Štruplová (Czech Republic) Denisa Hindová (Poland) Weronika Ewald (Romania) Ilinca Amariei
August 15	Monastir, Tunisia; Hard; W15; Singles and doubles draws	(Japan) Saki Imamura; 6–1, 6–1	(India) Jennifer Luikham	(Slovakia) Emma Tóthová (Peru) Anastasia Iamachkine	(Japan) Naho Sato (China) Li Zongyu (France) Evita Ramirez (South Korea) Wi Hwi-won
August 15	Monastir, Tunisia; Hard; W15; Singles and doubles draws	(China) Jiang Zijun (China) Li Zongyu; 6–1, 6–2	(India) Bhuvana Kalva (India) Jennifer Luikham	(Slovakia) Emma Tóthová (Peru) Anastasia Iamachkine	(Japan) Naho Sato (China) Li Zongyu (France) Evita Ramirez (South Korea) Wi Hwi-won
August 22	Zubr Cup; Přerov, Czech Republic; Clay; W60; Singles – Doubles	(Czech Republic) Barbora Palicová; 6–2, 1–6, 6–0	(Burundi) Sada Nahimana	(Spain) Irene Burillo Escorihuela (Venezuela) Andrea Gámiz	(Spain) Guiomar Maristany (Germany) Katharina Hobgarski (Czech Republic) Dominika Šalková (Czech Republic) Nikola Bartůňková
August 22	Zubr Cup; Přerov, Czech Republic; Clay; W60; Singles – Doubles	(Czech Republic) Anastasia Dețiuc (Czech Republic) Miriam Kolodziejová; 7–6^{(7–4)}, 4–6, [10–5]	(Japan) Funa Kozaki (Japan) Misaki Matsuda	(Spain) Irene Burillo Escorihuela (Venezuela) Andrea Gámiz	(Spain) Guiomar Maristany (Germany) Katharina Hobgarski (Czech Republic) Dominika Šalková (Czech Republic) Nikola Bartůňková
August 22	Braunschweig, Germany; Clay; W25; Singles and doubles draws	(Czech Republic) Brenda Fruhvirtová; 6–3, 6–1	(Germany) Noma Noha Akugue	(Germany) Julia Middendorf (Slovenia) Veronika Erjavec	(Croatia) Lea Bošković (Poland) Weronika Falkowska (Germany) Mona Barthel (Turkey) Çağla Büyükakçay
August 22	Braunschweig, Germany; Clay; W25; Singles and doubles draws	(Italy) Martina Colmegna (Germany) Anna Klasen; 6–3, 2–6, [10–5]	(Slovenia) Veronika Erjavec (Poland) Weronika Falkowska	(Germany) Julia Middendorf (Slovenia) Veronika Erjavec	(Croatia) Lea Bošković (Poland) Weronika Falkowska (Germany) Mona Barthel (Turkey) Çağla Büyükakçay
August 22	Oldenzaal, Netherlands; Clay; W25; Singles and doubles draws	(Spain) Leyre Romero Gormaz; 6–4, 7–6^{(7–2)}	Ekaterina Makarova	(Sweden) Kajsa Rinaldo Persson (Belgium) Magali Kempen	(Argentina) Julia Riera (Slovakia) Bianca Behúlová (Italy) Jessica Pieri (Italy) Melania Delai
August 22	Oldenzaal, Netherlands; Clay; W25; Singles and doubles draws	(Sweden) Jacqueline Cabaj Awad (Sweden) Caijsa Hennemann; 6–1, 6–3	(Netherlands) Rikke de Koning (Netherlands) Marente Sijbesma	(Sweden) Kajsa Rinaldo Persson (Belgium) Magali Kempen	(Argentina) Julia Riera (Slovakia) Bianca Behúlová (Italy) Jessica Pieri (Italy) Melania Delai
August 22	Goyang, South Korea; Hard; W25; Singles and doubles draws	(Japan) Kyōka Okamura; 1–6, 6–4, 6–3	(Thailand) Peangtarn Plipuech	(Belgium) Clara Vlasselaer (Thailand) Punnin Kovapitukted	(Japan) Momoko Kobori (South Korea) Choi Ji-hee (South Korea) Back Da-yeon (South Korea) Jeong Bo-young
August 22	Goyang, South Korea; Hard; W25; Singles and doubles draws	(Japan) Kyōka Okamura (Thailand) Peangtarn Plipuech; 6–1, 6–0	(South Korea) Kim Da-bin (Thailand) Punnin Kovapitukted	(Belgium) Clara Vlasselaer (Thailand) Punnin Kovapitukted	(Japan) Momoko Kobori (South Korea) Choi Ji-hee (South Korea) Back Da-yeon (South Korea) Jeong Bo-young
August 22	Vigo, Spain; Hard; W25; Singles and doubles draws	(Croatia) Antonia Ružić; 6–1, 6–1	(United Kingdom) Anna Brogan	(Spain) Eva Guerrero Álvarez (Bosnia and Herzegovina) Nefisa Berberović	(Spain) Lucía Cortez Llorca (China) You Xiaodi (Spain) Jéssica Bouzas Maneiro; Kristina Dmitruk
August 22	Vigo, Spain; Hard; W25; Singles and doubles draws	(Malta) Francesca Curmi (Malta) Elaine Genovese; 6–0, 6–3	(Denmark) Olga Helmi (Germany) Kathleen Kanev	(Spain) Eva Guerrero Álvarez (Bosnia and Herzegovina) Nefisa Berberović	(Spain) Lucía Cortez Llorca (China) You Xiaodi (Spain) Jéssica Bouzas Maneiro; Kristina Dmitruk
August 22	Verbier, Switzerland; Clay; W25; Singles and doubles draws	(Italy) Matilde Paoletti; 6–2, 3–6, 7–6^{(7–2)}	(Turkey) Zeynep Sönmez	(Switzerland) Valentina Ryser (Switzerland) Arlinda Rushiti	(Switzerland) Conny Perrin (Czech Republic) Michaela Bayerlová (Switzerland) Fiona Ganz (Switzerland) Jenny Dürst
August 22	Verbier, Switzerland; Clay; W25; Singles and doubles draws	(Japan) Erina Hayashi (Japan) Kanako Morisaki; 6–2, 6–1	(Czech Republic) Michaela Bayerlová (Italy) Nicole Fossa Huergo	(Switzerland) Valentina Ryser (Switzerland) Arlinda Rushiti	(Switzerland) Conny Perrin (Czech Republic) Michaela Bayerlová (Switzerland) Fiona Ganz (Switzerland) Jenny Dürst
August 22	Roehampton, United Kingdom; Hard; W25; Singles and doubles draws	(China) Gao Xinyu; 6–1, 6–0	(United Kingdom) Amarni Banks	(Hong Kong) Eudice Chong (Chinese Taipei) Joanna Garland	(India) Rutuja Bhosale (Japan) Erika Sema (Czech Republic) Lucie Havlíčková (Japan) Haruka Kaji
August 22	Roehampton, United Kingdom; Hard; W25; Singles and doubles draws	(India) Rutuja Bhosale (Japan) Erika Sema; 4–6, 6–3, [11–9]	(United Kingdom) Naiktha Bains (United Kingdom) Maia Lumsden	(Hong Kong) Eudice Chong (Chinese Taipei) Joanna Garland	(India) Rutuja Bhosale (Japan) Erika Sema (Czech Republic) Lucie Havlíčková (Japan) Haruka Kaji
August 22	Bad Waltersdorf, Austria; Clay; W15; Singles and doubles draws	(France) Tiphanie Fiquet; 7–6^{(7–2)}, 6–3	(Slovenia) Pia Lovrič	(Switzerland) Katerina Tsygourova; Ekaterina Ovcharenko	(Ukraine) Oleksandra Oliynykova (Serbia) Natalija Senić (Italy) Jennifer Ruggeri; Alevtina Ibragimova
August 22	Bad Waltersdorf, Austria; Clay; W15; Singles and doubles draws	(Romania) Karola Bejenaru (France) Tiphanie Fiquet; 2–6, 6–1, [10–5]	(Czech Republic) Nikola Břečková (Slovakia) Romana Čisovská	(Switzerland) Katerina Tsygourova; Ekaterina Ovcharenko	(Ukraine) Oleksandra Oliynykova (Serbia) Natalija Senić (Italy) Jennifer Ruggeri; Alevtina Ibragimova
August 22	Wanfercée-Baulet, Belgium; Clay; W15; Singles and doubles draws	(Netherlands) Stéphanie Visscher; 6–1, 6–4	(Belgium) Amelie Van Impe	(Belgium) Hanne Vandewinkel (Netherlands) Anouk Koevermans	Anastasia Sukhotina (Romania) Bianca Bulat (Belgium) Vicky Van de Peer; Polina Bakhmutkina
August 22	Wanfercée-Baulet, Belgium; Clay; W15; Singles and doubles draws	Polina Bakhmutkina; Anna Zyryanova; 6–4, 6–3	(Ukraine) Mariia Bergen (Argentina) Agustina Chlpac	(Belgium) Hanne Vandewinkel (Netherlands) Anouk Koevermans	Anastasia Sukhotina (Romania) Bianca Bulat (Belgium) Vicky Van de Peer; Polina Bakhmutkina
August 22	Cairo, Egypt; Clay; W15; Singles and doubles draws	(Japan) Mayuka Aikawa; 6–3, 7–5	(Egypt) Sandra Samir	(Serbia) Tijana Sretenović (Romania) Alexandra Iordache	(Sweden) Vanessa Ersöz (Romania) Bianca Bărbulescu (Italy) Anastasia Piangerelli (Italy) Beatrice Stagno
August 22	Cairo, Egypt; Clay; W15; Singles and doubles draws	(Italy) Anastasia Abbagnato (Italy) Beatrice Stagno; 6–1, 6–2	(Sweden) Vanessa Ersöz (Turkey) Doğa Türkmen	(Serbia) Tijana Sretenović (Romania) Alexandra Iordache	(Sweden) Vanessa Ersöz (Romania) Bianca Bărbulescu (Italy) Anastasia Piangerelli (Italy) Beatrice Stagno
August 22	Cancún, Mexico; Hard; W15; Singles and doubles draws	(Argentina) Solana Sierra; 6–3, 6–3	(Mexico) Victoria Rodríguez	(Colombia) María Paulina Pérez (Guatemala) Gabriela Rivera	(India) Prathyusha Rachapudi (Germany) Jantje Tilbürger; Noel Saidenova (Japan) Mio Mushika
August 22	Cancún, Mexico; Hard; W15; Singles and doubles draws	(United Kingdom) Alisha Reayer (Ecuador) Camila Romero; 6–3, 7–6^{(7–3)}	Noel Saidenova (Germany) Jantje Tilbürger	(Colombia) María Paulina Pérez (Guatemala) Gabriela Rivera	(India) Prathyusha Rachapudi (Germany) Jantje Tilbürger; Noel Saidenova (Japan) Mio Mushika
August 22	Norrköping, Sweden; Clay; W15; Singles and doubles draws	(Finland) Laura Hietaranta; 6–0, 6–0	(Italy) Enola Chiesa	(Sweden) Julita Saner (France) Laïa Petretic	(Italy) Irene Lavino (Slovakia) Mia Chudejová (Finland) Ella Haavisto (Canada) Ana Grubor
August 22	Norrköping, Sweden; Clay; W15; Singles and doubles draws	(Finland) Laura Hietaranta (France) Laïa Petretic; 6–4, 6–3	(Poland) Weronika Baszak (Norway) Astrid Wanja Brune Olsen	(Sweden) Julita Saner (France) Laïa Petretic	(Italy) Irene Lavino (Slovakia) Mia Chudejová (Finland) Ella Haavisto (Canada) Ana Grubor
August 22	Monastir, Tunisia; Hard; W15; Singles and doubles draws	(China) Li Zongyu; 6–4, 6–3	(China) Wei Sijia	(Turkey) Melis Ayda Uyar (China) Bai Zhuoxuan	(France) Yasmine Mansouri; Anastasia Kovaleva (Australia) Mia Repac (Japan) Saki Imamura
August 22	Monastir, Tunisia; Hard; W15; Singles and doubles draws	(Japan) Saki Imamura (Japan) Honoka Kobayashi; 3–6, 6–0, [10–6]	(China) Li Zongyu (Australia) Mia Repac	(Turkey) Melis Ayda Uyar (China) Bai Zhuoxuan	(France) Yasmine Mansouri; Anastasia Kovaleva (Australia) Mia Repac (Japan) Saki Imamura
August 29	Kuchyně Gorenje Prague Open; Prague, Czech Republic; Clay; W60; Singles – Doubles	(Hungary) Réka Luca Jani; 6–3, 7–6^{(7–4)}	(Germany) Noma Noha Akugue	(Argentina) María Lourdes Carlé (Japan) Misaki Matsuda	(Austria) Julia Grabher (Slovenia) Veronika Erjavec (Czech Republic) Barbora Palicová (Spain) Ángela Fita Boluda
August 29	Kuchyně Gorenje Prague Open; Prague, Czech Republic; Clay; W60; Singles – Doubles	(France) Elixane Lechemia (Germany) Julia Lohoff; 7–5, 7–5	(Czech Republic) Linda Klimovičová (Czech Republic) Dominika Šalková	(Argentina) María Lourdes Carlé (Japan) Misaki Matsuda	(Austria) Julia Grabher (Slovenia) Veronika Erjavec (Czech Republic) Barbora Palicová (Spain) Ángela Fita Boluda
August 29	TCCB Open; Collonge-Bellerive, Switzerland; Clay; W60; Singles – Doubles	(Italy) Lucrezia Stefanini; 6–2, 2–1, ret.	(Austria) Sinja Kraus	(South Korea) Jang Su-jeong (Italy) Dalila Spiteri	(Switzerland) Jenny Dürst (Brazil) Carolina Alves (Switzerland) Joanne Züger (France) Alice Tubello
August 29	TCCB Open; Collonge-Bellerive, Switzerland; Clay; W60; Singles – Doubles	(Switzerland) Jenny Dürst (Poland) Weronika Falkowska; 7–6^{(7–5)}, 6–1	(Czech Republic) Michaela Bayerlová (Sweden) Jacqueline Cabaj Awad	(South Korea) Jang Su-jeong (Italy) Dalila Spiteri	(Switzerland) Jenny Dürst (Brazil) Carolina Alves (Switzerland) Joanne Züger (France) Alice Tubello
August 29	Vienna, Austria; Clay; W25; Singles and doubles draws	(Hungary) Natália Szabanin; 7–5, 6–3	(Croatia) Tena Lukas	(Romania) Cristina Dinu (Latvia) Daniela Vismane	(Germany) Lena Papadakis (Italy) Angelica Moratelli (Bulgaria) Gergana Topalova (France) Alice Ramé
August 29	Vienna, Austria; Clay; W25; Singles and doubles draws	(Germany) Lena Papadakis (Czech Republic) Anna Sisková; 7–6^{(10–8)}, 6–4	(Slovenia) Živa Falkner (Hungary) Amarissa Kiara Tóth	(Romania) Cristina Dinu (Latvia) Daniela Vismane	(Germany) Lena Papadakis (Italy) Angelica Moratelli (Bulgaria) Gergana Topalova (France) Alice Ramé
August 29	Trieste, Italy; Clay; W25; Singles and doubles draws	(Argentina) Julia Riera; 6–1, 6–4	(Romania) Oana Georgeta Simion	(Slovenia) Dalila Jakupović (Romania) Miriam Bulgaru	(Spain) Rosa Vicens Mas (Germany) Anne Schäfer (Italy) Diletta Cherubini (Italy) Lisa Pigato
August 29	Trieste, Italy; Clay; W25; Singles and doubles draws	(China) Lu Jiajing (Slovenia) Nika Radišić; 7–5, 3–6, [15–13]	(Croatia) Lucija Ćirić Bagarić (Latvia) Diāna Marcinkēviča	(Slovenia) Dalila Jakupović (Romania) Miriam Bulgaru	(Spain) Rosa Vicens Mas (Germany) Anne Schäfer (Italy) Diletta Cherubini (Italy) Lisa Pigato
August 29	Almaty, Kazakhstan; Clay; W25; Singles and doubles draws	Ekaterina Maklakova; 6–4, 1–6, 6–4	(Kazakhstan) Zhibek Kulambayeva	Daria Khomutsianskaya; Amina Anshba	Anastasia Zolotareva; Dana Shakirova; Edda Mamedova; Tatiana Barkova
August 29	Almaty, Kazakhstan; Clay; W25; Singles and doubles draws	(Kazakhstan) Zhibek Kulambayeva; Ekaterina Yashina; 7–6^{(7–4)}, 5–7, [10–8]	Amina Anshba; Sofya Lansere	Daria Khomutsianskaya; Amina Anshba	Anastasia Zolotareva; Dana Shakirova; Edda Mamedova; Tatiana Barkova
August 29	Leiria, Portugal; Hard; W25; Singles and doubles draws	(Serbia) Natalija Stevanović; 2–6, 6–4, 6–4	(Ukraine) Kateryna Volodko	(Hong Kong) Eudice Chong (Japan) Sakura Hosogi	(Portugal) Francisca Jorge; Anastasia Tikhonova (Croatia) Antonia Ružić (Japan) Mai Hontama
August 29	Leiria, Portugal; Hard; W25; Singles and doubles draws	(Portugal) Francisca Jorge (Portugal) Matilde Jorge; 6–4, 6–0	(South Korea) Choi Ji-hee (Serbia) Natalija Stevanović	(Hong Kong) Eudice Chong (Japan) Sakura Hosogi	(Portugal) Francisca Jorge; Anastasia Tikhonova (Croatia) Antonia Ružić (Japan) Mai Hontama
August 29	Cairo, Egypt; Clay; W15; Singles and doubles draws	(Egypt) Sandra Samir; 6–2, 6–0	(Italy) Anastasia Abbagnato	(Egypt) Yasmin Ezzat (Japan) Mayuka Aikawa	(Italy) Vittoria Modesti (Slovakia) Barbora Matúšová (Germany) Antonia Schmidt (Romania) Alexandra Iordache
August 29	Cairo, Egypt; Clay; W15; Singles and doubles draws	(Egypt) Yasmin Ezzat (Greece) Dimitra Pavlou; 6–4, 6–4	(Japan) Mayuka Aikawa (China) Gao Xinyu	(Egypt) Yasmin Ezzat (Japan) Mayuka Aikawa	(Italy) Vittoria Modesti (Slovakia) Barbora Matúšová (Germany) Antonia Schmidt (Romania) Alexandra Iordache
August 29	Haren, Netherlands; Clay; W15; Singles and doubles draws	(Germany) Sina Herrmann; 7–5, 5–7, 6–3	(Netherlands) Anouk Koevermans	(Netherlands) Anouck Vrancken Peeters (Netherlands) Jasmijn Gimbrère	(United States) Jessie Aney (Netherlands) Stéphanie Visscher (Spain) Ariana Geerlings (Netherlands) Demi Tran
August 29	Haren, Netherlands; Clay; W15; Singles and doubles draws	(Netherlands) Annelin Bakker (Netherlands) Sarah van Emst; 6–3, 6–7^{(2–7)}, [10–5]	(Ukraine) Mariia Bergen (Argentina) Agustina Chlpac	(Netherlands) Anouck Vrancken Peeters (Netherlands) Jasmijn Gimbrère	(United States) Jessie Aney (Netherlands) Stéphanie Visscher (Spain) Ariana Geerlings (Netherlands) Demi Tran
August 29	Brașov, Romania; Clay; W15; Singles and doubles draws	(Romania) Ilinca Amariei; 6–1, 6–2	(Switzerland) Alina Granwehr	(Slovenia) Nastja Kolar (Romania) Cara Maria Meșter	(Romania) Ioana Gașpar (Italy) Linda Salvi (Romania) Simona Ogescu (Italy) Jessica Bertoldo
August 29	Brașov, Romania; Clay; W15; Singles and doubles draws	(Slovenia) Nastja Kolar (Serbia) Bojana Marinković; 6–4, 6–4	(Romania) Ilinca Amariei (Romania) Ioana Gașpar	(Slovenia) Nastja Kolar (Romania) Cara Maria Meșter	(Romania) Ioana Gașpar (Italy) Linda Salvi (Romania) Simona Ogescu (Italy) Jessica Bertoldo
August 29	Yeongwol, South Korea; Hard; W15; Singles and doubles draws	(South Korea) Jeong Su-nam; 6–4, 6–1	(Belgium) Clara Vlasselaer	(South Korea) Kim Da-bin (South Korea) Lee So-ra	(Thailand) Punnin Kovapitukted (China) Yang Yidi (Japan) Junri Namigata (South Korea) Lee Da-mi
August 29	Yeongwol, South Korea; Hard; W15; Singles and doubles draws	(South Korea) Back Da-yeon (South Korea) Lee Eun-hye; 7–5, 3–6, [13–11]	(Japan) Junri Namigata (Japan) Riko Sawayanagi	(South Korea) Kim Da-bin (South Korea) Lee So-ra	(Thailand) Punnin Kovapitukted (China) Yang Yidi (Japan) Junri Namigata (South Korea) Lee Da-mi
August 29	Monastir, Tunisia; Hard; W15; Singles and doubles draws	(China) Wei Sijia; 6–1, 6–4	(China) Bai Zhuoxuan	(China) Yao Xinxin (Peru) Anastasia Iamachkine	(Australia) Mia Repac (Switzerland) Sophie Lüscher (India) Jennifer Luikham (China) Li Zongyu
August 29	Monastir, Tunisia; Hard; W15; Singles and doubles draws	(Japan) Honoka Kobayashi (India) Jennifer Luikham; 6–3, 0–6, [10–5]	(Peru) Anastasia Iamachkine (United States) Teja Tirunelveli	(China) Yao Xinxin (Peru) Anastasia Iamachkine	(Australia) Mia Repac (Switzerland) Sophie Lüscher (India) Jennifer Luikham (China) Li Zongyu

=== September ===
Week of	Tournament	Winner	Runners-up	Semifinalists	Quarterfinalists
September 5	Montreux Ladies Open; Montreux, Switzerland; Clay; W60; Singles – Doubles	(Germany) Tamara Korpatsch; 6–4, 6–1	(United States) Emma Navarro	(Netherlands) Arantxa Rus (France) Océane Dodin	(France) Elsa Jacquemot (Latvia) Diāna Marcinkēviča (United States) Chiara Scholl (Switzerland) Sebastianna Scilipoti
September 5	Montreux Ladies Open; Montreux, Switzerland; Clay; W60; Singles – Doubles	(Algeria) Inès Ibbou (Switzerland) Naïma Karamoko; 2–6, 6–3, [16–14]	(Switzerland) Jenny Dürst (Poland) Weronika Falkowska	(Netherlands) Arantxa Rus (France) Océane Dodin	(France) Elsa Jacquemot (Latvia) Diāna Marcinkēviča (United States) Chiara Scholl (Switzerland) Sebastianna Scilipoti
September 5	Frýdek-Místek, Czech Republic; Clay; W25; Singles and doubles draws	(Czech Republic) Julie Štruplová; 6–3, 2–6, 6–4	(Germany) Lena Papadakis	(Japan) Misaki Matsuda (Denmark) Sofia Samavati	(Germany) Mara Guth (Greece) Sapfo Sakellaridi (Czech Republic) Miriam Kolodziejová (Czech Republic) Linda Klimovičová
September 5	Frýdek-Místek, Czech Republic; Clay; W25; Singles and doubles draws	(Czech Republic) Miriam Kolodziejová (Czech Republic) Dominika Šalková; 6–2, 6–3	(Japan) Funa Kozaki (Japan) Misaki Matsuda	(Japan) Misaki Matsuda (Denmark) Sofia Samavati	(Germany) Mara Guth (Greece) Sapfo Sakellaridi (Czech Republic) Miriam Kolodziejová (Czech Republic) Linda Klimovičová
September 5	Cairo, Egypt; Clay; W25; Singles and doubles draws	Anastasia Zolotareva; 7–5, 6–7^{(4–7)}, 6–4	(Spain) Rosa Vicens Mas	(Turkey) Berfu Cengiz (Serbia) Lola Radivojević	(Egypt) Sandra Samir (Turkey) İlay Yörük (Bulgaria) Gergana Topalova (Italy) Martina Colmegna
September 5	Cairo, Egypt; Clay; W25; Singles and doubles draws	(Japan) Mayuka Aikawa (Sweden) Vanessa Ersöz; 6–1, 7–5	(Romania) Elena-Teodora Cadar (Egypt) Sandra Samir	(Turkey) Berfu Cengiz (Serbia) Lola Radivojević	(Egypt) Sandra Samir (Turkey) İlay Yörük (Bulgaria) Gergana Topalova (Italy) Martina Colmegna
September 5	Saint-Palais-sur-Mer, France; Clay; W25; Singles and doubles draws	(France) Jessika Ponchet; 6–1, 6–4	(France) Séléna Janicijevic	(Turkey) Çağla Büyükakçay (France) Audrey Albié	(Belgium) Magali Kempen (China) Lu Jiajing (Spain) Irene Burillo Escorihuela (Italy) Jessica Pieri
September 5	Saint-Palais-sur-Mer, France; Clay; W25; Singles and doubles draws	(Belgium) Magali Kempen (China) Lu Jiajing; 6–4, 6–4	(France) Marine Partaud (Ukraine) Valeriya Strakhova	(Turkey) Çağla Büyükakçay (France) Audrey Albié	(Belgium) Magali Kempen (China) Lu Jiajing (Spain) Irene Burillo Escorihuela (Italy) Jessica Pieri
September 5	Santarém, Portugal; Hard; W25; Singles and doubles draws	Vitalia Diatchenko; 6–3, 6–2	(South Africa) Isabella Kruger	(Japan) Mai Hontama (Japan) Sakura Hosogi	(United States) Hina Inoue; Anastasia Tikhonova (Portugal) Matilde Jorge; Anna Kubareva
September 5	Santarém, Portugal; Hard; W25; Singles and doubles draws	(Japan) Mai Hontama (Australia) Maddison Inglis; 6–0, 6–4	(Netherlands) Suzan Lamens; Anastasia Tikhonova	(Japan) Mai Hontama (Japan) Sakura Hosogi	(United States) Hina Inoue; Anastasia Tikhonova (Portugal) Matilde Jorge; Anna Kubareva
September 5	Marbella, Spain; Clay; W25; Singles and doubles draws	(Spain) Leyre Romero Gormaz; 6–7^{(2–7)}, 6–2, 6–0	(Spain) Carlota Martínez Círez	(Spain) Ángela Fita Boluda (United Kingdom) Amanda Carreras	(France) Alice Ramé (Argentina) Julia Riera (China) You Xiaodi (Spain) Ane Mintegi del Olmo
September 5	Marbella, Spain; Clay; W25; Singles and doubles draws	(Spain) Jéssica Bouzas Maneiro (Spain) Leyre Romero Gormaz; 6–4, 6–2	(Argentina) Julia Riera (Chile) Daniela Seguel	(Spain) Ángela Fita Boluda (United Kingdom) Amanda Carreras	(France) Alice Ramé (Argentina) Julia Riera (China) You Xiaodi (Spain) Ane Mintegi del Olmo
September 5	Cancún, Mexico; Hard; W15; Singles and doubles draws	(United States) Ava Markham; 6–3, 3–6, 6–1	(Japan) Wakana Sonobe	(United States) Lexington Reed (United States) Esther Vyrlan	(Mexico) Victoria Rodríguez (Venezuela) Nadia Echeverría Alam (United States) Elizabeth Tkachenko (Brazil) Ana Candiotto
September 5	Cancún, Mexico; Hard; W15; Singles and doubles draws	(United States) Paris Corley (United States) Lexington Reed; 7–5, 6–3	(Canada) Louise Kwong (United States) Anna Ulyashchenko	(United States) Lexington Reed (United States) Esther Vyrlan	(Mexico) Victoria Rodríguez (Venezuela) Nadia Echeverría Alam (United States) Elizabeth Tkachenko (Brazil) Ana Candiotto
September 5	Casablanca, Morocco; Clay; W15; Singles and doubles draws	Alina Korneeva; 7–5, 6–4	(Finland) Laura Hietaranta	(Belgium) Vicky Van de Peer (Germany) Natalia Siedliska	(Slovakia) Ela Pláteníková (Spain) Noelia Bouzó Zanotti (Croatia) Mariana Dražić (Romania) Ilinca Amariei
September 5	Casablanca, Morocco; Clay; W15; Singles and doubles draws	(Finland) Laura Hietaranta (Netherlands) Stéphanie Visscher; 1–6, 7–5, [10–8]	(Croatia) Mariana Dražić; Aleksandra Pospelova	(Belgium) Vicky Van de Peer (Germany) Natalia Siedliska	(Slovakia) Ela Pláteníková (Spain) Noelia Bouzó Zanotti (Croatia) Mariana Dražić (Romania) Ilinca Amariei
September 5	Yeongwol, South Korea; Hard; W15; Singles and doubles draws	(South Korea) Back Da-yeon; 7–6^{(7–2)}, 3–0 ret.	(South Korea) Kim Da-bin	(South Korea) Ahn Yu-jin (Japan) Junri Namigata	(Thailand) Punnin Kovapitukted (Japan) Risa Ushijima (Japan) Ramu Ueda (South Korea) Jeong Bo-young
September 5	Yeongwol, South Korea; Hard; W15; Singles and doubles draws	(South Korea) Kim Da-bin (South Korea) Lee So-ra; 6–4, 3–6, [12–10]	(South Korea) Back Da-yeon (South Korea) Lee Eun-hye	(South Korea) Ahn Yu-jin (Japan) Junri Namigata	(Thailand) Punnin Kovapitukted (Japan) Risa Ushijima (Japan) Ramu Ueda (South Korea) Jeong Bo-young
September 5	Monastir, Tunisia; Hard; W15; Singles and doubles draws	(China) Wei Sijia; 6–3, 6–1	(China) Li Zongyu	(China) Dong Na (China) Bai Zhuoxuan	(China) Yao Xinxin (Japan) Honoka Kobayashi (Italy) Lara Pfeifer (Italy) Maria Vittoria Viviani
September 5	Monastir, Tunisia; Hard; W15; Singles and doubles draws	(Japan) Honoka Kobayashi; Milana Zhabrailova; 7–5, 6–2	(Switzerland) Paula Cembranos (Switzerland) Sophie Lüscher	(China) Dong Na (China) Bai Zhuoxuan	(China) Yao Xinxin (Japan) Honoka Kobayashi (Italy) Lara Pfeifer (Italy) Maria Vittoria Viviani
September 12
September 12	ITF Féminin Le Neubourg; Le Neubourg, France; Hard; W80+H; Singles – Doubles	(Romania) Jaqueline Cristian; 6–4, 6–4	(Belgium) Magali Kempen	(France) Harmony Tan (Germany) Mona Barthel	(Belgium) Ysaline Bonaventure; Polina Kudermetova (Poland) Magdalena Fręch (France) Audrey Albié
September 12	ITF Féminin Le Neubourg; Le Neubourg, France; Hard; W80+H; Singles – Doubles	(United Kingdom) Freya Christie (United Kingdom) Ali Collins; 1–6, 7–6^{(7–4)}, [10–3]	(Poland) Weronika Falkowska (United Kingdom) Sarah Beth Grey	(France) Harmony Tan (Germany) Mona Barthel	(Belgium) Ysaline Bonaventure; Polina Kudermetova (Poland) Magdalena Fręch (France) Audrey Albié
September 12	Caldas da Rainha Ladies Open; Caldas da Rainha, Portugal; Hard; W60+H; Singles – Doubles	(Italy) Lucrezia Stefanini; 3–6, 6–1, 7–6^{(7–3)}	(Spain) Marina Bassols Ribera	(Colombia) Emiliana Arango (Denmark) Olga Helmi	Vitalia Diatchenko (Hong Kong) Eudice Chong; Yuliya Hatouka (United States) Adriana Reami
September 12	Caldas da Rainha Ladies Open; Caldas da Rainha, Portugal; Hard; W60+H; Singles – Doubles	(United States) Adriana Reami (United States) Anna Rogers; 6–4, 7–5	(United States) Elysia Bolton (United States) Jamie Loeb	(Colombia) Emiliana Arango (Denmark) Olga Helmi	Vitalia Diatchenko (Hong Kong) Eudice Chong; Yuliya Hatouka (United States) Adriana Reami
September 12	Darwin Tennis International; Darwin, Australia; Hard; W25; Singles and doubles draws	(Australia) Alexandra Bozovic; 6–1, 6–4	(Australia) Destanee Aiava	(Thailand) Luksika Kumkhum (United Kingdom) Naiktha Bains	(Australia) Talia Gibson (Japan) Natsuho Arakawa (United States) Jessica Failla (Japan) Momoko Kobori
September 12	Darwin Tennis International; Darwin, Australia; Hard; W25; Singles and doubles draws	(Japan) Momoko Kobori (Thailand) Luksika Kumkhum; 6–2, 7–6^{(7–3)}	(Japan) Yui Chikaraishi (Japan) Nanari Katsumi	(Thailand) Luksika Kumkhum (United Kingdom) Naiktha Bains	(Australia) Talia Gibson (Japan) Natsuho Arakawa (United States) Jessica Failla (Japan) Momoko Kobori
September 12	Jablonec nad Nisou, Czech Republic; Clay; W25; Singles and doubles draws	(Spain) Leyre Romero Gormaz; 6–1, 7–6^{(7–1)}	(Japan) Misaki Matsuda	(Slovenia) Nina Potočnik (Denmark) Sofia Samavati	(Slovakia) Eszter Méri (Germany) Lena Papadakis (Czech Republic) Anna Sisková (Austria) Barbara Haas
September 12	Jablonec nad Nisou, Czech Republic; Clay; W25; Singles and doubles draws	(Kazakhstan) Anna Danilina (Ukraine) Valeriya Strakhova; 7–5, 6–1	(Germany) Lena Papadakis (Czech Republic) Anna Sisková	(Slovenia) Nina Potočnik (Denmark) Sofia Samavati	(Slovakia) Eszter Méri (Germany) Lena Papadakis (Czech Republic) Anna Sisková (Austria) Barbara Haas
September 12	Santa Margherita di Pula, Italy; Clay; W25; Singles and doubles draws	(Czech Republic) Brenda Fruhvirtová; 6–4, 2–0 ret.	(Italy) Jessica Pieri	(Italy) Diletta Cherubini (Greece) Sapfo Sakellaridi	(Germany) Katharina Hobgarski (Italy) Angelica Raggi (France) Alice Ramé (Spain) Jéssica Bouzas Maneiro
September 12	Santa Margherita di Pula, Italy; Clay; W25; Singles and doubles draws	(Kazakhstan) Zhibek Kulambayeva (Latvia) Darja Semenistaja; 6–2, 6–2	(China) Lu Jiajing (Bosnia and Herzegovina) Anita Wagner	(Italy) Diletta Cherubini (Greece) Sapfo Sakellaridi	(Germany) Katharina Hobgarski (Italy) Angelica Raggi (France) Alice Ramé (Spain) Jéssica Bouzas Maneiro
September 12	Varna, Bulgaria; Clay; W15; Singles and doubles draws	(Romania) Patricia Maria Țig; 6–1, 6–0	(Croatia) Lucija Ćirić Bagarić	(Bulgaria) Daria Shalamanova (Romania) Elena Ruxandra Bertea	(Bulgaria) Yoana Radulova (Bulgaria) Lia Karatancheva (Czech Republic) Nikola Břečková (Bulgaria) Denislava Glushkova
September 12	Varna, Bulgaria; Clay; W15; Singles and doubles draws	(Romania) Patricia Maria Țig (Romania) Maria Toma; 6–4, 6–4	(Turkey) Melis Sezer (Bulgaria) Julia Stamatova	(Bulgaria) Daria Shalamanova (Romania) Elena Ruxandra Bertea	(Bulgaria) Yoana Radulova (Bulgaria) Lia Karatancheva (Czech Republic) Nikola Břečková (Bulgaria) Denislava Glushkova
September 12	Sharm El Sheikh, Egypt; Hard; W15; Singles and doubles draws	Polina Iatcenko; 7–6^{(8–6)}, 6–2	(Sweden) Jacqueline Cabaj Awad	(Egypt) Yasmin Ezzat (Slovakia) Katarína Kužmová	(India) Sravya Shivani Chilakalapudi (Georgia (country)) Nino Natsvlishvili (Estonia) Katriin Saar; Aliona Falei
September 12	Sharm El Sheikh, Egypt; Hard; W15; Singles and doubles draws	Aliona Falei (Georgia (country)) Nino Natsvlishvili; 6–3, 6–4	(Chinese Taipei) Chen Pei-hsuan (Chinese Taipei) Lin Fang-an	(Egypt) Yasmin Ezzat (Slovakia) Katarína Kužmová	(India) Sravya Shivani Chilakalapudi (Georgia (country)) Nino Natsvlishvili (Estonia) Katriin Saar; Aliona Falei
September 12	Dijon, France; Clay; W15; Singles and doubles draws	(France) Loïs Boisson; 7–5, 3–6, 7–5	(United States) Vivian Wolff	(Switzerland) Tess Sugnaux (Argentina) Luisina Giovannini	(Belgium) Chelsea Vanhoutte (Turkey) Başak Eraydın (France) Inès Nicault (Switzerland) Nicole Gadient
September 12	Dijon, France; Clay; W15; Singles and doubles draws	(France) Jade Bornay (Switzerland) Alina Granwehr; 6–2, 6–3	(Switzerland) Nicole Gadient (Belgium) Chelsea Vanhoutte	(Switzerland) Tess Sugnaux (Argentina) Luisina Giovannini	(Belgium) Chelsea Vanhoutte (Turkey) Başak Eraydın (France) Inès Nicault (Switzerland) Nicole Gadient
September 12	Cancún, Mexico; Hard; W15; Singles and doubles draws	(United States) Kaitlin Quevedo; 6–4, 6–3	(Brazil) Thaisa Grana Pedretti	(Guatemala) Gabriela Rivera (Mexico) Jessica Hinojosa Gómez	(Japan) Ena Koike (Bulgaria) Verginie Tchakarova (Colombia) María Camila Torres Murcia (Chinese Taipei) Lin Li-hsin
September 12	Cancún, Mexico; Hard; W15; Singles and doubles draws	(United States) Anna Ulyashchenko (Dominican Republic) Kelly Williford; 7–6^{(7–5)}, 4–6, [10–6]	(Venezuela) Nadia Echeverría Alam (Mexico) Jessica Hinojosa Gomez	(Guatemala) Gabriela Rivera (Mexico) Jessica Hinojosa Gómez	(Japan) Ena Koike (Bulgaria) Verginie Tchakarova (Colombia) María Camila Torres Murcia (Chinese Taipei) Lin Li-hsin
September 12	Casablanca, Morocco; Clay; W15; Singles and doubles draws	(Finland) Laura Hietaranta; 6–2, 6–2	(Switzerland) Marie Mettraux	(Germany) Natalia Siedliska (Morocco) Sara Akid	(Netherlands) Jasmijn Gimbrère (Romania) Ilinca Amariei (Argentina) Lucía Peyre (Czech Republic) Linda Ševčíková
September 12	Casablanca, Morocco; Clay; W15; Singles and doubles draws	(Romania) Ilinca Amariei (Czech Republic) Linda Ševčíková; 4–6, 6–2, [10–5]	(Italy) Matilde Mariani (Italy) Linda Salvi	(Germany) Natalia Siedliska (Morocco) Sara Akid	(Netherlands) Jasmijn Gimbrère (Romania) Ilinca Amariei (Argentina) Lucía Peyre (Czech Republic) Linda Ševčíková
September 12	Melilla, Spain; Clay; W15; Singles and doubles draws	(Romania) Karola Bejenaru; 7–5, 6–1	(United States) Amy Zhu	(Spain) Lucía Llinares Domingo (Spain) Victoria Gómez	(France) Naïa Mercadier (Italy) Giorgia Pinto (Australia) Roisin Gilheany (Spain) Ana Giraldi Requena
September 12	Melilla, Spain; Clay; W15; Singles and doubles draws	(Romania) Karola Bejenaru (United States) Amy Zhu; 6–3, 6–3	(Italy) Giorgia Pinto (Italy) Gaia Squarcialupi	(Spain) Lucía Llinares Domingo (Spain) Victoria Gómez	(France) Naïa Mercadier (Italy) Giorgia Pinto (Australia) Roisin Gilheany (Spain) Ana Giraldi Requena
September 12	Monastir, Tunisia; Hard; W15; Singles and doubles draws	(China) Bai Zhuoxuan; 6–2, 6–4	(Italy) Samira De Stefano	Milana Zhabrailova (China) Wei Sijia	(Italy) Lara Pfeifer (China) Dong Na (China) Jiang Zijun (United States) Jaeda Daniel
September 12	Monastir, Tunisia; Hard; W15; Singles and doubles draws	(Chinese Taipei) Lee Ya-hsin (Chinese Taipei) Tsao Chia-yi; 7–6^{(8–6)}, 6–4	(Poland) Emilia Durska (Italy) Camilla Zanolini	Milana Zhabrailova (China) Wei Sijia	(Italy) Lara Pfeifer (China) Dong Na (China) Jiang Zijun (United States) Jaeda Daniel
September 19	Vrnjačka Banja Open; Vrnjačka Banja, Serbia; Clay; W60; Singles – Doubles	(Spain) Aliona Bolsova; 7–5, 6–1	(Slovenia) Nina Potočnik	(Serbia) Mia Ristić (Romania) Alexandra Cadanțu-Ignatik	(Romania) Cristina Dinu (Australia) Jaimee Fourlis (Croatia) Tena Lukas (Serbia) Lola Radivojević
September 19	Vrnjačka Banja Open; Vrnjačka Banja, Serbia; Clay; W60; Singles – Doubles	Darya Astakhova; Ekaterina Reyngold; 3–6, 6–2, [10–8]	(Romania) Cristina Dinu (Slovenia) Nika Radišić	(Serbia) Mia Ristić (Romania) Alexandra Cadanțu-Ignatik	(Romania) Cristina Dinu (Australia) Jaimee Fourlis (Croatia) Tena Lukas (Serbia) Lola Radivojević
September 19	Berkeley Tennis Club Challenge; Berkeley, United States; Hard; W60; Singles – Doubles	(United States) Madison Brengle; 6–7^{(3–7)}, 6–3, 6–2	(China) Yuan Yue	Diana Shnaider (United States) Louisa Chirico	(Denmark) Johanne Svendsen (United States) Kayla Day (United States) Ashlyn Krueger (Mexico) Renata Zarazúa
September 19	Berkeley Tennis Club Challenge; Berkeley, United States; Hard; W60; Singles – Doubles	(United States) Elvina Kalieva (United States) Peyton Stearns; 7–6^{(7–5)}, 7–6^{(7–5)}	(United States) Allura Zamarripa (United States) Maribella Zamarripa	Diana Shnaider (United States) Louisa Chirico	(Denmark) Johanne Svendsen (United States) Kayla Day (United States) Ashlyn Krueger (Mexico) Renata Zarazúa
September 19	Darwin Tennis International; Darwin, Australia; Hard; W25; Singles and doubles draws	(Australia) Alexandra Bozovic; 3–6, 6–3, 6–3	(Australia) Talia Gibson	(Slovakia) Zuzana Zlochová (Thailand) Luksika Kumkhum	(Japan) Momoko Kobori (Australia) Alana Parnaby (New Zealand) Monique Barry (United Kingdom) Naiktha Bains
September 19	Darwin Tennis International; Darwin, Australia; Hard; W25; Singles and doubles draws	(Australia) Talia Gibson (Australia) Petra Hule; 2–6, 7–5, [10–5]	(Australia) Lisa Mays (Japan) Ramu Ueda	(Slovakia) Zuzana Zlochová (Thailand) Luksika Kumkhum	(Japan) Momoko Kobori (Australia) Alana Parnaby (New Zealand) Monique Barry (United Kingdom) Naiktha Bains
September 19	Santa Margherita di Pula, Italy; Clay; W25; Singles and doubles draws	(Germany) Katharina Hobgarski; 6–1, 6–1	(Italy) Camilla Rosatello	(Switzerland) Ylena In-Albon (Sweden) Kajsa Rinaldo Persson	(Italy) Federica Bilardo (Latvia) Darja Semenistaja (Belgium) Marie Benoît (Italy) Denise Valente
September 19	Santa Margherita di Pula, Italy; Clay; W25; Singles and doubles draws	(Italy) Angelica Moratelli (Italy) Camilla Rosatello; 6–4, 6–4	(Italy) Jennifer Ruggeri (Bolivia) Noelia Zeballos	(Switzerland) Ylena In-Albon (Sweden) Kajsa Rinaldo Persson	(Italy) Federica Bilardo (Latvia) Darja Semenistaja (Belgium) Marie Benoît (Italy) Denise Valente
September 19	Otočec, Slovenia; Clay; W25; Singles and doubles draws	(Romania) Miriam Bulgaru; 7–5, 6–4	(Argentina) Paula Ormaechea	(Burundi) Sada Nahimana (Slovakia) Rebecca Šramková	(Slovenia) Pia Lovrič; Alina Korneeva (Romania) Lavinia Tănăsie (Croatia) Lea Bošković
September 19	Otočec, Slovenia; Clay; W25; Singles and doubles draws	Irina Khromacheva; Iryna Shymanovich; 6–2, 6–4	(Egypt) Sandra Samir (Chinese Taipei) Yang Ya-yi	(Burundi) Sada Nahimana (Slovakia) Rebecca Šramková	(Slovenia) Pia Lovrič; Alina Korneeva (Romania) Lavinia Tănăsie (Croatia) Lea Bošković
September 19	Guayaquil, Ecuador; Clay; W15; Singles and doubles draws	(United States) Sofia Sewing; 4–6, 6–3, 6–2	(Colombia) María Herazo González	(Ecuador) Camila Romero (Peru) Romina Ccuno	(South Africa) Wozuko Mdlulwa (Ecuador) Valeska San Martín (United States) Sydney Dorcil (Colombia) Antonia Samudio
September 19	Guayaquil, Ecuador; Clay; W15; Singles and doubles draws	(Colombia) María Paulina Pérez (United States) Sofia Sewing; 6–4, 1–6, [10–2]	(Peru) Romina Ccuno (Colombia) María Herazo González	(Ecuador) Camila Romero (Peru) Romina Ccuno	(South Africa) Wozuko Mdlulwa (Ecuador) Valeska San Martín (United States) Sydney Dorcil (Colombia) Antonia Samudio
September 19	Sharm El Sheikh, Egypt; Hard; W15; Singles and doubles draws	Elena Pridankina; 3–6, 6–4, 6–4	(Slovakia) Katarína Kužmová	(Italy) Giuliana Bestetti; Aliona Falei	(United Kingdom) Jasmine Conway (Georgia (country)) Nino Natsvlishvili; Polina Iatcenko; Darya Shauha
September 19	Sharm El Sheikh, Egypt; Hard; W15; Singles and doubles draws	Aglaya Fedorova; Elena Pridankina; 7–5, 6–1	(Egypt) Yasmin Ezzat; Aliona Falei	(Italy) Giuliana Bestetti; Aliona Falei	(United Kingdom) Jasmine Conway (Georgia (country)) Nino Natsvlishvili; Polina Iatcenko; Darya Shauha
September 19	Cancún, Mexico; Hard; W15; Singles and doubles draws	(Guatemala) Gabriela Rivera; 4–3, ret.	(United States) Salma Ewing	(United States) Kaitlin Quevedo (United States) Solymar Colling	(Brazil) Thaisa Grana Pedretti (United States) Mia Slama (United States) Lauren Proctor (United States) Anna Ulyashchenko
September 19	Cancún, Mexico; Hard; W15; Singles and doubles draws	(Mexico) María Fernanda Navarro (United States) Lauren Proctor; 6–3, 5–7, [10–7]	(Mexico) Jessica Hinojosa Gómez (Mexico) Victoria Rodríguez	(United States) Kaitlin Quevedo (United States) Solymar Colling	(Brazil) Thaisa Grana Pedretti (United States) Mia Slama (United States) Lauren Proctor (United States) Anna Ulyashchenko
September 19	Ceuta, Spain; Hard; W15; Singles and doubles draws	(Denmark) Olga Helmi; 4–0, ret.	(Sweden) Louise Brunskog	(Spain) Olga Parres Azcoitia (Poland) Aleksandra Zuchańska	(Spain) Lucía Llinares Domingo (Slovakia) Mia Chudejová; Elizaveta Morozova (Ukraine) Nadiya Kolb
September 19	Ceuta, Spain; Hard; W15; Singles and doubles draws	(Ukraine) Maryna Kolb (Ukraine) Nadiya Kolb; 6–4, 6–2	(Spain) Lucía Llinares Domingo (Spain) Olga Parres Azcoitia	(Spain) Olga Parres Azcoitia (Poland) Aleksandra Zuchańska	(Spain) Lucía Llinares Domingo (Slovakia) Mia Chudejová; Elizaveta Morozova (Ukraine) Nadiya Kolb
September 19	Monastir, Tunisia; Hard; W15; Singles and doubles draws	(Switzerland) Nadine Keller; 6–2, 7–6^{(9–7)}	(France) Yasmine Mansouri	(China) Li Zongyu (China) Yao Xinxin	(Greece) Eleni Kordolaimi (United Kingdom) Amarni Banks (India) Jennifer Luikham (Denmark) Rebecca Munk Mortensen
September 19	Monastir, Tunisia; Hard; W15; Singles and doubles draws	(Chinese Taipei) Lee Ya-hsin (Chinese Taipei) Tsao Chia-yi; 6–0, 6–1	(United Kingdom) Abigail Amos (United States) Jaeda Daniel	(China) Li Zongyu (China) Yao Xinxin	(Greece) Eleni Kordolaimi (United Kingdom) Amarni Banks (India) Jennifer Luikham (Denmark) Rebecca Munk Mortensen
September 19	Lubbock, United States; Hard; W15; Singles and doubles draws	(United States) Liv Hovde; 7–6^{(7–2)}, 6–1	(Canada) Carson Branstine	(Poland) Martyna Kubka (United States) McCartney Kessler	(Germany) Jantje Tilbürger (Spain) Raquel González Vilar; Veronica Miroshnichenko (Thailand) Thasaporn Naklo
September 19	Lubbock, United States; Hard; W15; Singles and doubles draws	(Serbia) Katarina Kozarov; Veronica Miroshnichenko; 6–1, 4–6, [11–9]	(Chinese Taipei) Hsu Chieh-yu; Maria Kononova	(Poland) Martyna Kubka (United States) McCartney Kessler	(Germany) Jantje Tilbürger (Spain) Raquel González Vilar; Veronica Miroshnichenko (Thailand) Thasaporn Naklo
September 26	Open Internacional de San Sebastián; San Sebastián, Spain; Clay; W60; Singles – Doubles	(Austria) Julia Grabher; 6–3, 7–6^{(7–3)}	(Spain) Aliona Bolsova	(Cyprus) Raluca Șerban (Netherlands) Eva Vedder	(Ukraine) Katarina Zavatska (Argentina) Paula Ormaechea (Germany) Nastasja Schunk (Czech Republic) Brenda Fruhvirtová
September 26	Open Internacional de San Sebastián; San Sebastián, Spain; Clay; W60; Singles – Doubles	(Spain) Aliona Bolsova (Ukraine) Katarina Zavatska; 1–2, ret.	(Spain) Ángela Fita Boluda (Spain) Guiomar Maristany	(Cyprus) Raluca Șerban (Netherlands) Eva Vedder	(Ukraine) Katarina Zavatska (Argentina) Paula Ormaechea (Germany) Nastasja Schunk (Czech Republic) Brenda Fruhvirtová
September 26	Central Coast Pro Tennis Open; Templeton, United States; Hard; W60; Singles – Doubles	(United States) Madison Brengle; 4–6, 6–4, 6–2	(United States) Robin Montgomery	(United States) Sophie Chang (Ukraine) Kateryna Volodko	(Japan) Nao Hibino (Mexico) Marcela Zacarías (Poland) Katarzyna Kawa (China) Yuan Yue
September 26	Central Coast Pro Tennis Open; Templeton, United States; Hard; W60; Singles – Doubles	(Japan) Nao Hibino (United States) Sabrina Santamaria; 6–4, 7–6^{(7–4)}	(United States) Sophie Chang (Poland) Katarzyna Kawa	(United States) Sophie Chang (Ukraine) Kateryna Volodko	(Japan) Nao Hibino (Mexico) Marcela Zacarías (Poland) Katarzyna Kawa (China) Yuan Yue
September 26	Nanao, Japan; Carpet; W25; Singles and doubles draws	(Japan) Haruka Kaji; 3–6, 6–3, 6–3	(Japan) Momoko Kobori	(Japan) Rina Saigo (Japan) Sakura Hosogi	(Japan) Kyōka Okamura (Japan) Chihiro Muramatsu (Japan) Nagi Hanatani (Switzerland) Lulu Sun
September 26	Nanao, Japan; Carpet; W25; Singles and doubles draws	(Japan) Funa Kozaki (Japan) Ikumi Yamazaki; 3–6, 7–6^{(7–5)}, [10–5]	(Japan) Aoi Ito (Japan) Rinon Okuwaki	(Japan) Rina Saigo (Japan) Sakura Hosogi	(Japan) Kyōka Okamura (Japan) Chihiro Muramatsu (Japan) Nagi Hanatani (Switzerland) Lulu Sun
September 26	Santa Margherita di Pula, Italy; Clay; W25; Singles and doubles draws	(Switzerland) Ylena In-Albon; 6–3, 6–2	(Germany) Noma Noha Akugue	(Spain) Rosa Vicens Mas (Latvia) Darja Semenistaja	(Italy) Martina Colmegna (Belgium) Marie Benoît (Italy) Deborah Chiesa (Czech Republic) Sára Bejlek
September 26	Santa Margherita di Pula, Italy; Clay; W25; Singles and doubles draws	Amina Anshba (Romania) Oana Georgeta Simion; 6–3, 6–1	(Italy) Angelica Moratelli (Italy) Lisa Pigato	(Spain) Rosa Vicens Mas (Latvia) Darja Semenistaja	(Italy) Martina Colmegna (Belgium) Marie Benoît (Italy) Deborah Chiesa (Czech Republic) Sára Bejlek
September 26	Lisboa Belém Open; Lisbon, Portugal; Clay; W25; Singles and doubles draws	(France) Carole Monnet; 1–6, 6–3, 6–2	(Switzerland) Joanne Züger	(United Kingdom) Amanda Carreras (Germany) Luisa Meyer auf der Heide	(Turkey) Çağla Büyükakçay (Germany) Stephanie Wagner (Greece) Martha Matoula (France) Séléna Janicijevic
September 26	Lisboa Belém Open; Lisbon, Portugal; Clay; W25; Singles and doubles draws	(Portugal) Francisca Jorge (Portugal) Matilde Jorge; 6–2, 6–2	(Spain) Irene Burillo Escorihuela (Spain) Andrea Lázaro García	(United Kingdom) Amanda Carreras (Germany) Luisa Meyer auf der Heide	(Turkey) Çağla Büyükakçay (Germany) Stephanie Wagner (Greece) Martha Matoula (France) Séléna Janicijevic
September 26	Otočec, Slovenia; Clay; W25; Singles and doubles draws	Iryna Shymanovich; 6–3, 3–6, 6–3	(Romania) Miriam Bulgaru	(Slovenia) Nina Potočnik; Irina Khromacheva	Alina Korneeva (Germany) Katharina Gerlach (Czech Republic) Dominika Šalková; Evialina Laskevich
September 26	Otočec, Slovenia; Clay; W25; Singles and doubles draws	(United States) Jessie Aney (Czech Republic) Anna Sisková; 3–0 ret.	Irina Khromacheva; Iryna Shymanovich	(Slovenia) Nina Potočnik; Irina Khromacheva	Alina Korneeva (Germany) Katharina Gerlach (Czech Republic) Dominika Šalková; Evialina Laskevich
September 26	Austin, United States; Hard; W25; Singles and doubles draws	(United States) Peyton Stearns; 6–1, 6–0	(United States) Clervie Ngounoue	(Israel) Nicole Khirin (Japan) Yuki Naito	(United States) Ashley Lahey (United States) Tatum Evans; Jana Kolodynska (United States) Jamie Loeb
September 26	Austin, United States; Hard; W25; Singles and doubles draws	(Australia) Elysia Bolton (United States) Jamie Loeb; 6–3, 6–3	(Poland) Martyna Kubka (United States) Ashley Lahey	(Israel) Nicole Khirin (Japan) Yuki Naito	(United States) Ashley Lahey (United States) Tatum Evans; Jana Kolodynska (United States) Jamie Loeb
September 26	Eldorado, Argentina; Clay; W15; Singles and doubles draws	(Argentina) Solana Sierra; 6–3, 6–3	(Argentina) Luisina Giovannini	(France) Emma Léné (Argentina) Luciana Moyano	(Brazil) Júlia Konishi Camargo Silva (Argentina) Valentina Mutilba (Argentina) Chiara Di Genova (Brazil) Geórgia Gulin
September 26	Eldorado, Argentina; Clay; W15; Singles and doubles draws	(Brazil) Júlia Konishi Camargo Silva (France) Emma Léné; 6–2, 6–0	(Argentina) Luciana Blatter (Argentina) Tiziana Rossini	(France) Emma Léné (Argentina) Luciana Moyano	(Brazil) Júlia Konishi Camargo Silva (Argentina) Valentina Mutilba (Argentina) Chiara Di Genova (Brazil) Geórgia Gulin
September 26	Guayaquil, Ecuador; Clay; W15; Singles and doubles draws	(Colombia) María Herazo González; 6–4, 6–3	(United States) Sofia Sewing	(Ecuador) Tania Isabel Andrade Sabando (Colombia) María Paulina Pérez	(Ecuador) Camila Romero (Peru) Romina Ccuno (Colombia) Laura Daniela Arciniegas Patiño (Colombia) Antonia Samudio
September 26	Guayaquil, Ecuador; Clay; W15; Singles and doubles draws	(Peru) Romina Ccuno (Colombia) María Herazo González; 6–2, 5–7, [11–9]	(Colombia) María Paulina Pérez (United States) Sofia Sewing	(Ecuador) Tania Isabel Andrade Sabando (Colombia) María Paulina Pérez	(Ecuador) Camila Romero (Peru) Romina Ccuno (Colombia) Laura Daniela Arciniegas Patiño (Colombia) Antonia Samudio
September 26	Sharm El Sheikh, Egypt; Hard; W15; Singles and doubles draws	Darya Shauha; 6–2, 7–6^{(7–3)}	Aliona Falei	(United Kingdom) Jasmine Conway (Egypt) Yasmin Ezzat	(Chinese Taipei) Lin Fang-an (Romania) Briana Szabó (Egypt) Merna Refaat; Polina Iatcenko
September 26	Sharm El Sheikh, Egypt; Hard; W15; Singles and doubles draws	(Italy) Anastasia Abbagnato (Italy) Beatrice Stagno; 2–6, 6–3, [10–5]	Aglaya Fedorova; Elena Pridankina	(United Kingdom) Jasmine Conway (Egypt) Yasmin Ezzat	(Chinese Taipei) Lin Fang-an (Romania) Briana Szabó (Egypt) Merna Refaat; Polina Iatcenko
September 26	Cancún, Mexico; Hard; W15; Singles and doubles draws	(United States) Kaitlin Quevedo; 6–2, 6–3	(Israel) Mika Dagan Fruchtman	(United States) Lauren Proctor (Mexico) Jessica Hinojosa Gómez	(Japan) Mayu Crossley (Mexico) María Fernanda Martínez Hernández (Guatemala) Gabriela Rivera (Japan) Ena Koike
September 26	Cancún, Mexico; Hard; W15; Singles and doubles draws	(Canada) Louise Kwong (United States) Anna Ulyashchenko; 6–4, 6–4	(Mexico) Jessica Hinojosa Gómez (United States) Kaitlin Quevedo	(United States) Lauren Proctor (Mexico) Jessica Hinojosa Gómez	(Japan) Mayu Crossley (Mexico) María Fernanda Martínez Hernández (Guatemala) Gabriela Rivera (Japan) Ena Koike
September 26	Monastir, Tunisia; Hard; W15; Singles and doubles draws	(China) Wei Sijia; 6–3, 6–2	(China) Yao Xinxin	(China) Dong Na; Anna Ukolova	(United States) Jaeda Daniel (Greece) Eleni Kordolaimi (United Kingdom) Abigail Amos (United Kingdom) Amarni Banks
September 26	Monastir, Tunisia; Hard; W15; Singles and doubles draws	(China) Dong Na (India) Jennifer Luikham; 6–7^{(6–8)}, 6–4, [10–6]	(United Kingdom) Abigail Amos (Austria) Arabella Koller	(China) Dong Na; Anna Ukolova	(United States) Jaeda Daniel (Greece) Eleni Kordolaimi (United Kingdom) Abigail Amos (United Kingdom) Amarni Banks
September 26	Hilton Head Island, United States; Clay; W15; Singles and doubles draws	All competition was cancelled due to the Hurricane Ian			(Ecuador) Mell Reasco (Spain) Carolina Gómez (United States) Victoria Hu (United States) McCartney Kessler; Anastasia Sysoeva (United States) Paris Corley (Japan) Ange Oby Kajuru (Germany) Johanna Silva
September 26	Hilton Head Island, United States; Clay; W15; Singles and doubles draws	(United States) Paris Corley / (United States) Lexington Reed vs (Poland) Daria Kuczer / (Luxembourg) Eléonora Molinaro			(Ecuador) Mell Reasco (Spain) Carolina Gómez (United States) Victoria Hu (United States) McCartney Kessler; Anastasia Sysoeva (United States) Paris Corley (Japan) Ange Oby Kajuru (Germany) Johanna Silva
