= 2022 ITF World Tennis Tour Gran Canaria – Singles =

Singles
- 2022 ITF World Tennis Tour Gran Canaria

Final
- Champion: (Netherlands) Arantxa Rus
- Runner-up: Polina Kudermetova
- Score: 6–3, 3–6, 6–1

Events
Singles	Doubles
← 2021 ·	ITF World Tennis Tour Gran Canaria	· 2023 →

Arantxa Rus was the defending champion and successfully defended her title, defeating Polina Kudermetova in the final, 6–3, 3–6, 6–1.

== Seeds ==
All seeds receive a bye into the second round.

1. (Netherlands) Arantxa Rus (champion)
2. (Netherlands) Suzan Lamens (second round)
3. (France) Carole Monnet (semifinals)
4. (Spain) Ángela Fita Boluda (quarterfinals)
5. (Italy) Giulia Gatto-Monticone (second round)
6. (Chile) Daniela Seguel (third round)
7. (Spain) Rosa Vicens Mas (third round)
8. (Spain) Leyre Romero Gormaz (quarterfinals)
9. (Spain) Irene Burillo Escorihuela (quarterfinals)
10. (Spain) Jéssica Bouzas Maneiro (second round)
11. (Chinese Taipei) Liang En-shuo (quarterfinals)
12. (Italy) Martina Di Giuseppe (second round)
13. Polina Kudermetova (final)
14. (Norway) Malene Helgø (third round)
15. (United States) Maria Mateas (third round)
16. (Czech Republic) Barbora Palicová (third round)

== Draw ==
=== Key ===
- Q = Qualifier
- WC = Wild card
- LL = Lucky loser
- Alt = Alternate
- SE = Special exempt
- PR = Protected ranking
- ITF = ITF entry
- JE = Junior exempt
- w/o = Walkover
- r = Retired
- d = Defaulted
- SR = Special ranking

=== Finals ===
Quarterfinals
1	(Netherlands) Arantxa Rus	6	6
9	(Spain) Irene Burillo Escorihuela	1	2
3	(France) Carole Monnet	2	7	6
8	(Spain) Leyre Romero Gormaz	6	5	2
(Serbia) Lola Radivojević	6	7
4	(Spain) Ángela Fita Boluda	3	5
11	(Chinese Taipei) Liang En-shuo	3	1
13	Polina Kudermetova	6	6

Semifinals
1	(Netherlands) Arantxa Rus	6	6
3	(France) Carole Monnet	3	1
(Serbia) Lola Radivojević	4	1
13	Polina Kudermetova	6	6

Final
1	(Netherlands) Arantxa Rus	6	3	6
13	Polina Kudermetova	3	6	1

=== Top half ===
==== Section 1 ====
First round
Q	(Mexico) CS Martínez Solis	0	0
(Hungary) N Szabanin	6	6
Q	(Romania) M Toma	4	6	3
WC	(Spain) N Bouzó Zanotti	6	3	6
(United Kingdom) A Carreras	2	6	5
(India) R Bhosale	6	0	7
Q	(Spain) M González Encinas	3	7^{11}	1
(Czech Republic) A Laboutková	6	6^{9}	6

Second round
1	(Netherlands) A Rus	6	6
(Hungary) N Szabanin	0	2
WC	(Spain) N Bouzó Zanotti	4	6	1
15/PR	(United States) M Mateas	6	4	6
9	(Spain) I Burillo Escorihuela	6	6
(India) R Bhosale	2	4
(Czech Republic) A Laboutková	6	6
5	(Italy) G Gatto-Monticone	2	1

Third round
1	(Netherlands) A Rus	4	6	6
15/PR	(United States) M Mateas	6	1	2
9	(Spain) I Burillo Escorihuela	2	6	6
(Czech Republic) A Laboutková	6	0	1

Quarterfinals
1	(Netherlands) A Rus	6	6
9	(Spain) I Burillo Escorihuela	1	2

==== Section 2 ====
First round
Q	(Bulgaria) L Karatancheva	1	6^{3}
(Spain) C Hoste Ferrer	6	7^{7}
(Ukraine) V Strakhova	6	7^{7}
(Switzerland) L Küng	3	6^{3}
(Greece) M Matoula	6	6
WC	(Denmark) O Gram	0	4
(Italy) D Cherubini	7	4	6
Q	(Germany) C Sauvant	5	6	3

Second round
3	(France) C Monnet	6	6
(Spain) C Hoste Ferrer	0	0
(Ukraine) V Strakhova	5	4
16	(Czech Republic) B Palicová	7	6
12	(Italy) M Di Giuseppe	0	1
(Greece) M Matoula	6	6
(Italy) D Cherubini	3	3
8	(Spain) L Romero Gormaz	6	6

Third round
3	(France) C Monnet	6	6
16	(Czech Republic) B Palicová	2	1
(Greece) M Matoula	1	3
8	(Spain) L Romero Gormaz	6	6

Quarterfinals
3	(France) C Monnet	2	7	6
8	(Spain) L Romero Gormaz	6	5	2

=== Bottom half ===
==== Section 3 ====
First round
(France) M Rouvroy	6	6
(Colombia) M Herazo González	4	2
Q	(Italy) C Girelli	2	2
(Serbia) L Radivojević	6	6
(Slovakia) R Zelníčková	4	7^{7}	6
Q	(Italy) G Ceschi	6	6^{5}	1
Q	(Norway) LE Håseth	7	7^{7}
(Japan) H Sato	5	6^{5}

Second round
6	(Chile) D Seguel	7	6
(France) M Rouvroy	5	2
(Serbia) L Radivojević	7^{7}	6
10	(Spain) J Bouzas Maneiro	6^{4}	2
14	(Norway) M Helgø	6	6
(Slovakia) R Zelníčková	1	2
Q	(Norway) LE Håseth	3	2
4	(Spain) Á Fita Boluda	6	6

Third round
6	(Chile) D Seguel	1	6	2
(Serbia) L Radivojević	6	3	6
14	(Norway) M Helgø	6	5	1
4	(Spain) Á Fita Boluda	1	7	6

Quarterfinals
(Serbia) L Radivojević	6	7
4	(Spain) Á Fita Boluda	3	5

==== Section 4 ====
First round
(Germany) J Jebawy	6	3	6
WC	(Spain) M García Reboredo	4	6	3
(Italy) M Delai	7	6
(Germany) S Herrmann	5	3
WC	(Spain) X Estévez Grillo	0	0
(Algeria) I Ibbou	6	6
(Spain) L Cortez Llorca	6	6
(Italy) F Rossi	0	4

Second round
7/WC	(Spain) R Vicens Mas	6	7
(Germany) J Jebawy	0	5
(Italy) M Delai	0	0
11	(Chinese Taipei) E-s Liang	6	6
13	P Kudermetova	6	6
(Algeria) I Ibbou	2	4
(Spain) L Cortez Llorca	6	6
2	(Netherlands) S Lamens	2	4

Third round
7/WC	(Spain) R Vicens Mas	3	3
11	(Chinese Taipei) E-s Liang	6	6
13	P Kudermetova	6	6
(Spain) L Cortez Llorca	1	2

Quarterfinals
11	(Chinese Taipei) E-s Liang	3	1
13	P Kudermetova	6	6
