= 2022 ITF World Tennis Tour Gran Canaria =

Tennis tournament

- Date: 1–7 August 2022
- Edition: 2nd
- Category: ITF Women's World Tennis Tour
- Prize money: $60,000
- Surface: Clay / Outdoor
- Location: San Bartolomé de Tirajana, Spain

Champions

Singles
- (Netherlands) Arantxa Rus

Doubles
- (Spain) Jéssica Bouzas Maneiro / (Spain) Leyre Romero Gormaz
- ITF World Tennis Tour Gran Canaria

The 2022 ITF World Tennis Tour Gran Canaria was a professional tennis tournament played on outdoor clay courts. It was the second edition of the tournament which was part of the 2022 ITF Women's World Tennis Tour. It took place in San Bartolomé de Tirajana, Spain between 1 and 7 August 2022.

== Champions ==
=== Singles ===
- (Netherlands) Arantxa Rus def. Polina Kudermetova, 6–3, 3–6, 6–1

=== Doubles ===
- (Spain) Jéssica Bouzas Maneiro / (Spain) Leyre Romero Gormaz def. (Spain) Lucía Cortez Llorca / (Spain) Rosa Vicens Mas, 1–6, 7–5, [10–6]

== Singles main draw entrants ==
=== Seeds ===
Country	Player	Rank^{1}	Seed
NED	Arantxa Rus	75	1
NED	Suzan Lamens	198	2
FRA	Carole Monnet	264	3
ESP	Ángela Fita Boluda	275	4
ITA	Giulia Gatto-Monticone	277	5
CHI	Daniela Seguel	284	6
ESP	Rosa Vicens Mas	285	7
ESP	Leyre Romero Gormaz	294	8
ESP	Irene Burillo Escorihuela	303	9
ESP	Jéssica Bouzas Maneiro	306	10
TPE	Liang En-shuo	331	11
ITA	Martina Di Giuseppe	334	12
	Polina Kudermetova	336	13
NOR	Malene Helgø	338	14
USA	Maria Mateas	369	15
CZE	Barbora Palicová	373	16

- ^{1} Rankings are as of 25 July 2022.

=== Other entrants ===
The following players received wildcards into the singles main draw:

- (Spain) Noelia Bouzó Zanotti
- (Spain) Xiomara Estévez Grillo
- (Spain) Marta García Reboredo
- (Denmark) Olivia Gram
- (Spain) Rosa Vicens Mas

The following players received entry into the singles main draw using a protected ranking:

- (United States) Maria Mateas

The following players received entry from the qualifying draw:

- (Italy) Gloria Ceschi
- (Italy) Chiara Girelli
- (Spain) Marta González Encinas
- (Norway) Lilly Elida Håseth
- (Bulgaria) Lia Karatancheva
- (Mexico) Claudia Sofía Martínez Solis
- (Germany) Chantal Sauvant
- (Romania) Maria Toma
