= 2022 ITF World Tennis Tour Gran Canaria – Doubles =

Doubles
- 2022 ITF World Tennis Tour Gran Canaria

Final
- Champions: (Spain) Jéssica Bouzas Maneiro (Spain) Leyre Romero Gormaz
- Runners-up: (Spain) Lucía Cortez Llorca (Spain) Rosa Vicens Mas
- Score: 1–6, 7–5, [10–6]

Events
Singles	Doubles
← 2021 ·	ITF World Tennis Tour Gran Canaria	· 2023 →

Elina Avanesyan and Oksana Selekhmeteva were the defending champions but chose not to participate.

Jéssica Bouzas Maneiro and Leyre Romero Gormaz won the title, defeating Lucía Cortez Llorca and Rosa Vicens Mas in the final, 1–6, 7–5, [10–6].

== Seeds ==
1. (India) Rutuja Bhosale / (Ukraine) Valeriya Strakhova (first round)
2. (Spain) Ángela Fita Boluda / (Netherlands) Arantxa Rus (semifinals)
3. (Colombia) María Herazo González / (France) Carole Monnet (first round)
4. (Spain) Jéssica Bouzas Maneiro / (Spain) Leyre Romero Gormaz (champions)

== Draw ==
=== Key ===
- Q = Qualifier
- WC = Wild card
- LL = Lucky loser
- Alt = Alternate
- SE = Special exempt
- PR = Protected ranking
- ITF = ITF entry
- JE = Junior exempt
- w/o = Walkover
- r = Retired
- d = Defaulted
- SR = Special ranking

=== Draw ===
First round
1	(India) R Bhosale (Ukraine) V Strakhova	5	6^{3}
(Norway) M Helgø (Netherlands) S Lamens	7	7^{7}
(Japan) E Hayashi (Japan) K Morisaki	5	6	[10]
(Chinese Taipei) E-s Liang (Japan) H Sato	7	4	[7]
4	(Spain) J Bouzas Maneiro (Spain) L Romero Gormaz	6	6
(United States) M Mateas (Germany) C Sauvant	3	1
(Switzerland) L Küng (France) M Rouvroy	6	4	[10]
WC	(Spain) N Bouzó Zanotti (Algeria) I Ibbou	4	6	[6]
WC	(Spain) M García Reboredo (Denmark) O Gram	4	6	[10]
WC	(Spain) M González Encinas (Spain) C Hoste Ferrer	6	2	[7]
(Spain) L Cortez Llorca (Spain) R Vicens Mas	6	6
3	(Colombia) M Herazo González (France) C Monnet	4	3
(Italy) M Delai (Italy) F Rossi	4	6^{4}
(Italy) M Di Giuseppe (Italy) G Gatto-Monticone	6	7^{7}
(Germany) S Hermann (Greece) M Matoula	2	1
2	(Spain) Á Fita Boluda (Netherlands) A Rus	6	6

Quarterfinals
(Norway) M Helgø (Netherlands) S Lamens	7	6
(Japan) E Hayashi (Japan) K Morisaki	5	2
4	(Spain) J Bouzas Maneiro (Spain) L Romero Gormaz	6	6
(Switzerland) L Küng (France) M Rouvroy	1	4
WC	(Spain) M García Reboredo (Denmark) O Gram	3	1
(Spain) L Cortez Llorca (Spain) R Vicens Mas	6	6
(Italy) M Di Giuseppe (Italy) G Gatto-Monticone	5	7^{7}	[7]
2	(Spain) Á Fita Boluda (Netherlands) A Rus	7	6^{5}	[10]

Semifinals
(Norway) M Helgø (Netherlands) S Lamens	4	5
4	(Spain) J Bouzas Maneiro (Spain) L Romero Gormaz	6	7
(Spain) L Cortez Llorca (Spain) R Vicens Mas	6	6
2	(Spain) Á Fita Boluda (Netherlands) A Rus	4	4

Final
4	(Spain) J Bouzas Maneiro (Spain) L Romero Gormaz	1	7	[10]
(Spain) L Cortez Llorca (Spain) R Vicens Mas	6	5	[6]
