= Rosa Vicens Mas =

Spanish tennis player (born 2000)

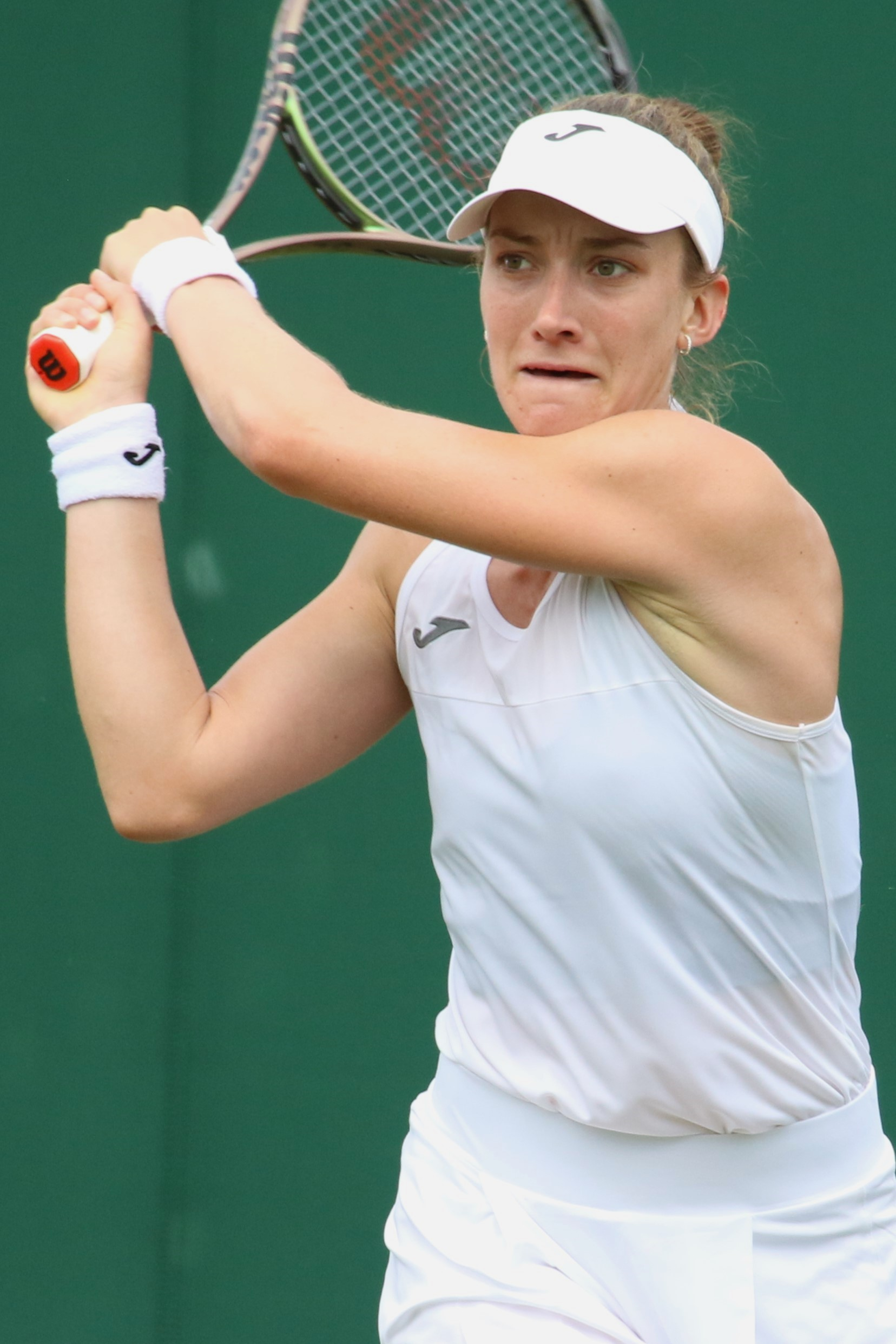
- Vicens Mas at the 2023 Wimbledon Championships
- Country (sports): Spain
- Born: 25 June 2000 (age 25)
- Plays: Right (two-handed backhand)
- Prize money: US$ 171,187

Singles
- Career record: 233–148
- Career titles: 9 ITF
- Highest ranking: No. 175 (17 April 2023)

Grand Slam singles results
- Australian Open: Q1 (2023)
- French Open: Q1 (2023)
- Wimbledon: Q1 (2023)

Doubles
- Career record: 62–73
- Career titles: 1 ITF
- Highest ranking: No. 285 (30 January 2023)

Rosa Vicens Mas (born 25 June 2000) is a Spanish former tennis player.

Vicens Mas has a career-high singles ranking by the WTA of 175, achieved on 17 April 2023. She also has a career-high doubles ranking of world No. 285, attained on 30 January 2023. She won nine singles titles and one doubles title on the ITF Women's Circuit.

== Career ==
In March 2023, Vicens Mas became the champion in Tucumán, Argentina, by defeating Brazilian player Carolina Alves.

She made her WTA Tour main-draw debut as a qualifier at the 2023 Copa Colsanitas, losing in the first round to Peyton Stearns in straight sets.

== ITF Circuit finals ==
=== Singles: 16 (9 titles, 7 runner-ups) ===
| Legend $60,000 tournaments $25,000 tournaments (3–4) $15,000 tournaments (6–3) | Legend Hard (1–2) Clay (7–5) Carpet (1–0) |

| Result | W–L | Date | Tournament | Tier | Surface | Opponent | Score |
|---|---|---|---|---|---|---|---|
| Loss | 0–1 | Mar 2018 | ITF Heraklion, Greece | 15,000 | Clay | (Hungary) Réka Luca Jani | 4–6, 5–7 |
| Win | 1–1 | Mar 2019 | ITF Tabarka, Tunisia | 15,000 | Clay | (Russia) Daria Lodikova | 6–4, 6–4 |
| Win | 2–1 | April 2019 | ITF Tabarka, Tunisia | 15,000 | Clay | (United Kingdom) Amanda Carreras | 6–4, 6–2 |
| Loss | 2–2 | Jan 2020 | ITF Manacor, Spain | 15,000 | Hard | (Romania) Ioana Loredana Roșca | 4–6, 1–6 |
| Win | 3–2 | Jun 2021 | ITF Antalya, Turkey | 15,000 | Clay | (Colombia) María Herazo González | 6–1, 6–2 |
| Win | 4–2 | Oct 2021 | ITF Antalya, Turkey | 15,000 | Clay | (United Kingdom) Sonay Kartal | 6–1, 2–6, 6–3 |
| Loss | 4–3 | Oct 2021 | ITF Antalya, Turkey | 15,000 | Clay | (Argentina) Julia Riera | 4–6, 7–5, 6–7^{(1)} |
| Win | 5–3 | Dec 2021 | ITF Cairo, Egypt | 15,000 | Clay | (United States) Anastasia Nefedova | 6–4, 6–4 |
| Win | 6–3 | Mar 2022 | ITF Antalya, Turkey | 15,000 | Clay | (Serbia) Dejana Radanović | 6–4, 5–7, 6–1 |
| Win | 7–3 | May 2022 | ITF Tossa de Mar, Spain | 25,000 | Carpet | (South Africa) Isabella Kruger | 7–5, 6–3 |
| Win | 8–3 | Jul 2022 | ITF Guimarães, Portugal | 25,000 | Hard | (Australia) Alexandra Bozovic | 6–4, 6–1 |
| Loss | 8–4 | Sep 2022 | ITF Cairo, Egypt | 25,000 | Clay | (Russia) Anastasia Zolotareva | 5–7, 7–6^{(4)}, 4–6 |
| Loss | 8–5 | Feb 2023 | ITF Tucumán, Argentina | 25,000 | Clay | (Argentina) Solana Sierra | 2–6, 2–6 |
| Win | 9–5 | Mar 2023 | ITF Tucumán, Argentina | 25,000 | Clay | (Brazil) Carolina Alves | 6–2, 6–1 |
| Loss | 9–6 | Mar 2023 | ITF Palma Nova, Spain | 25,000 | Clay | (Spain) Guiomar Maristany | 4–6, 6–1, 1–6 |
| Loss | 9–7 | Jun 2023 | ITF Tauste, Spain | 25,000+H | Hard | (Australia) Lizette Cabrera | 1–6, 3–6 |

=== Doubles: 2 (1 title, 1 runner-up) ===
| Legend $60,000 tournaments (0–1) $15,000 tournaments (1–0) | Legend Clay (1–1) |

| Result | W–L | Date | Tournament | Tier | Surface | Partner | Opponents | Score |
|---|---|---|---|---|---|---|---|---|
| Win | 1–0 | Nov 2018 | ITF Vinaròs, Spain | 15,000 | Clay | (Spain) Gemma Lairon Navarro | (Spain) Noelia Bouzó Zanotti (Romania) Ioana Loredana Roșca | 7–6^{(7)}, 6–3 |
| Loss | 1–1 | Aug 2022 | ITF San Bartolomé de Tirajana, Spain | 60,000 | Clay | (Spain) Lucía Cortez Llorca | (Spain) Jéssica Bouzas Maneiro (Spain) Leyre Romero Gormaz | 6–1, 5–7, [6–10] |
