= 2023 Wiesbaden Tennis Open – Doubles =

Doubles
- 2023 Wiesbaden Tennis Open

Final
- Champions: (Australia) Jaimee Fourlis (Australia) Olivia Gadecki
- Runners-up: (United Kingdom) Emily Appleton (Germany) Julia Lohoff
- Score: 6–1, 6–4

Events
Singles	Doubles
← 2022 ·	Wiesbaden Tennis Open	· 2024 →

Amina Anshba and Panna Udvardy were the defending champions but Udvardy chose not to participate. Anshba partnered alongside Anastasia Dețiuc but lost in the first round to Kimberly Birrell and Asia Muhammad.

Jaimee Fourlis and Olivia Gadecki won the title, defeating Emily Appleton and Julia Lohoff in the final, 6–1, 6–4.

== Seeds ==
1. (United Kingdom) Alicia Barnett / (United Kingdom) Olivia Nicholls (semifinals)
2. (Venezuela) Andrea Gámiz / (Netherlands) Eva Vedder (quarterfinals)
3. Amina Anshba / (Czech Republic) Anastasia Dețiuc (first round)
4. (Germany) Vivian Heisen / (Czech Republic) Renata Voráčová (first round)

== Draw ==
Key

- Q = Qualifier
- WC = Wild card
- LL = Lucky loser
- Alt = Alternate
- ITF = ITF entry
- PR = Protected ranking
- SR = Special ranking
- SE = Special exempt
- JE = Junior exempt
- JR = Junior Accelerator Programme entrant
- CO = College Accelerator Programme entrant
- NG = Next Gen Accelerator Program entrant
- w/o = Walkover
- r = Retired
- d = Defaulted

First round
1	(United Kingdom) A Barnett (United Kingdom) O Nicholls	6	6
K Laskutova; E Makarova	2	0
(Netherlands) I Haverlag (Lithuania) J Mikulskytė	4	6	[8]
(Slovenia) D Jakupović (Slovenia) N Radišić	6	2	[10]
4	(Germany) V Heisen (Czech Republic) R Voráčová	1	4
(Australia) J Fourlis (Australia) O Gadecki	6	6
WC	(Croatia) M Dražić (Romania) A Prisăcariu	6	6
A Fomina-Klotz; E Yashina	2	4
WC	(Germany) A Klasen (Germany) Jo Steur	6^{3}	6	[7]
(Germany) N Noha Akugue (Germany) E Seidel	7^{7}	0	[10]
(Australia) K Birrell (United States) A Muhammad	6	6
3	A Anshba (Czech Republic) A Dețiuc	3	4
(Belgium) M Kempen (Belgium) Y Wickmayer	4	4
(United Kingdom) E Appleton (Germany) J Lohoff	6	6
WC	(Germany) L Böhner (Germany) K Kanev	3	3
2	(Venezuela) A Gámiz (Netherlands) E Vedder	6	6

Quarterfinals
1	(United Kingdom) A Barnett (United Kingdom) O Nicholls	6	6
(Slovenia) D Jakupović (Slovenia) N Radišić	4	1
(Australia) J Fourlis (Australia) O Gadecki	6	6
WC	(Croatia) M Dražić (Romania) A Prisăcariu	2	1
(Germany) N Noha Akugue (Germany) E Seidel	6	6
(Australia) K Birrell (United States) A Muhammad	0	3
(United Kingdom) E Appleton (Germany) J Lohoff	6	6
2	(Venezuela) A Gámiz (Netherlands) E Vedder	4	3

Semifinals
1	(United Kingdom) A Barnett (United Kingdom) O Nicholls	4	5
(Australia) J Fourlis (Australia) O Gadecki	6	7
(Germany) N Noha Akugue (Germany) E Seidel	d
(United Kingdom) E Appleton (Germany) J Lohoff

Final
(Australia) J Fourlis (Australia) O Gadecki	6	6
(United Kingdom) E Appleton (Germany) J Lohoff	1	4
