= 2024 Wiesbaden Tennis Open – Doubles =

Doubles
- 2024 Wiesbaden Tennis Open

Final
- Champions: (United Kingdom) Samantha Murray Sharan (Brazil) Laura Pigossi
- Runners-up: (Japan) Himeno Sakatsume (Bosnia and Herzegovina) Anita Wagner
- Score: 7–5, 6–2

Events
Singles	Doubles
← 2023 ·	Wiesbaden Tennis Open	· 2025 →

Jaimee Fourlis and Olivia Gadecki were the defending champions but Gadecki chose to compete in Saint-Malo instead. Fourlis partnered alongside Priscilla Hon but lost in the first round to Himeno Sakatsume and Anita Wagner.

Samantha Murray Sharan and Laura Pigossi won the title, defeating Sakatsume and Wagner in the final, 7–5, 6–2.

== Seeds ==
1. (Georgia (country)) Oksana Kalashnikova / Yana Sizikova (semifinals)
2. (Slovenia) Dalila Jakupović / (United States) Sabrina Santamaria (quarterfinals)
3. (Georgia (country)) Natela Dzalamidze / (Latvia) Darja Semeņistaja (quarterfinals)
4. (Poland) Maja Chwalińska / (Czech Republic) Jesika Malečková (quarterfinals, withdrew)

== Draw ==
Key

- Q = Qualifier
- WC = Wild card
- LL = Lucky loser
- Alt = Alternate
- ITF = ITF entry
- PR = Protected ranking
- SR = Special ranking
- SE = Special exempt
- JE = Junior exempt
- JR = Junior Accelerator Programme entrant
- CO = College Accelerator Programme entrant
- NG = Next Gen Accelerator Program entrant
- w/o = Walkover
- r = Retired
- d = Defaulted

First round
(Slovenia) V Erjavec (Slovenia) T Zidanšek	4	6^{4}
(Kazakhstan) A Arystanbekova (Kazakhstan) S Zhiyenbayeva	6	7^{7}
3	(Georgia (country)) N Dzalamidze (Latvia) D Semeņistaja	6	6
WC	(Cyprus) N Andronicou (Germany) K Kanev	4	2
E Makarova; T Prozorova	4	1
(United Kingdom) S Murray Sharan (Brazil) L Pigossi	6	6
(Australia) J Fourlis (Australia) P Hon	3	1
(Japan) H Sakatsume (Bosnia and Herzegovina) A Wagner	6	6
(Germany) T Morderger (Germany) Y Morderger	2	1
4	(Poland) M Chwalińska (Czech Republic) J Malečková	6	6
J Avdeeva (Germany) A Schmidt	7^{7}	6^{5}	[10]
(Spain) L Romero Gormaz (Croatia) T Würth	6^{3}	7^{7}	[8]
(Argentina) M Capurro Taborda (Argentina) J Riera	1	2
2	(Slovenia) D Jakupović (United States) S Santamaria	6	6

Quarterfinals
1	(Georgia (country)) O Kalashnikova; Y Sizikova	7	6
(Kazakhstan) A Arystanbekova (Kazakhstan) S Zhiyenbayeva	5	2
3	(Georgia (country)) N Dzalamidze (Latvia) D Semeņistaja	5	3
(United Kingdom) S Murray Sharan (Brazil) L Pigossi	7	6
(Japan) H Sakatsume (Bosnia and Herzegovina) A Wagner	w/o
4	(Poland) M Chwalińska (Czech Republic) J Malečková
J Avdeeva (Germany) A Schmidt	7	2	[10]
2	(Slovenia) D Jakupović (United States) S Santamaria	5	6	[4]

Semifinals
1	(Georgia (country)) O Kalashnikova; Y Sizikova	4	1
(United Kingdom) S Murray Sharan (Brazil) L Pigossi	6	6
(Japan) H Sakatsume (Bosnia and Herzegovina) A Wagner	6	5	[10]
J Avdeeva (Germany) A Schmidt	3	7	[7]

Final
(United Kingdom) S Murray Sharan (Brazil) L Pigossi	7	6
(Japan) H Sakatsume (Bosnia and Herzegovina) A Wagner	5	2
