= 2021 Wiesbaden Tennis Open =

Tennis tournament

- Date: 20–26 September 2021
- Edition: 12th
- Category: ITF Women's World Tennis Tour
- Prize money: $80,000
- Surface: Clay
- Location: Wiesbaden, Germany

Champions

Singles
- (Hungary) Anna Bondár

Doubles
- (Hungary) Anna Bondár / (Belgium) Lara Salden
← 2019 ·	Wiesbaden Tennis Open	· 2022 →

The 2021 Wiesbaden Tennis Open was a professional women's tennis tournament played on outdoor clay courts. It was the twelfth edition of the tournament which was part of the 2021 ITF Women's World Tennis Tour. It took place in Wiesbaden, Germany between 20 and 26 September 2021.

== Singles main-draw entrants ==
=== Seeds ===
Country	Player	Rank^{1}	Seed
FRA	Clara Burel	92	1
ESP	Cristina Bucșa	151	2
HUN	Anna Bondár	182	3
RUS	Marina Melnikova	191	4
HUN	Réka Luca Jani	195	5
ITA	Giulia Gatto-Monticone	200	6
ITA	Lucrezia Stefanini	205	7
ITA	Federica Di Sarra	212	8

- ^{1} Rankings are as of 13 September 2021.

=== Other entrants ===
The following players received wildcards into the singles main draw:

- (Germany) Mina Hodzic
- (Germany) Kathleen Kanev
- (Germany) Anna Klasen
- (Germany) Laura Isabel Putz

The following player received entry using a junior exempt:

- (Andorra) Victoria Jiménez Kasintseva

The following players received entry from the qualifying draw:

- (Latvia) Kamilla Bartone
- (Bosnia and Herzegovina) Nefisa Berberović
- (Italy) Cristiana Ferrando
- (North Macedonia) Lina Gjorcheska
- (Netherlands) Arianne Hartono
- (Germany) Lena Papadakis
- (Romania) Andreea Roșca
- (Germany) Stephanie Wagner

The following player received entry as a lucky loser:

- (Germany) Yana Morderger

== Champions ==
=== Singles ===
- (Hungary) Anna Bondár def. (France) Clara Burel, 6–2, 6–4

=== Doubles ===
- (Hungary) Anna Bondár / (Belgium) Lara Salden def. (Netherlands) Arianne Hartono / (Australia) Olivia Tjandramulia, 6–7^{(9–11)}, 6–2, [10–4]
