= 2023 Montevideo Open – Singles =

Singles
- 2023 Montevideo Open

Final
- Champion: (Mexico) Renata Zarazúa
- Runner-up: (France) Diane Parry
- Score: 7–5, 3–6, 6–4

Events
| Singles | Doubles |
- Montevideo Open

Renata Zarazúa won the singles title at the 2023 Montevideo Open, defeating Diane Parry in the final, 7–5, 3–6, 6–4.

Diana Shnaider was the reigning champion, but chose not to participate.

== Seeds ==
1. (France) Diane Parry (final)
2. (Mexico) Renata Zarazúa (champion)
3. (Argentina) Martina Capurro Taborda (second round)
4. (Argentina) Julia Riera (quarterfinals)
5. (Argentina) María Lourdes Carlé (semifinals)
6. (Romania) Miriam Bulgaru (quarterfinals)
7. (Argentina) Solana Sierra (quarterfinals)
8. (Greece) Valentini Grammatikopoulou (first round)

== Draw ==
Key

- Q = Qualifier
- WC = Wild card
- LL = Lucky loser
- Alt = Alternate
- ITF = ITF entry
- PR = Protected ranking
- SR = Special ranking
- SE = Special exempt
- JE = Junior exempt
- JR = Junior Accelerator Programme entrant
- CO = College Accelerator Programme entrant
- NG = Next Gen Accelerator Program entrant
- w/o = Walkover
- r = Retired
- d = Defaulted

=== Finals ===
Semifinals
1 | (France) Diane Parry | 7^{7} | 6
(United States) Robin Montgomery | 6^{5} | 3
5 | (Argentina) María Lourdes Carlé | 1 | 6 | 5
2 | (Mexico) Renata Zarazúa | 6 | 2 | 7

Final
1 | (France) Diane Parry | 5 | 6 | 4
2 | (Mexico) Renata Zarazúa | 7 | 3 | 6

=== Top half ===
First round
1 | (France) D Parry | 7 | 6
A Anshba | 5 | 3
(Greece) D Papamichail | 6 | 6
(United States) V Hu | 4 | 2
WC | (Uruguay) J Rodríguez | 3 | 4
(Georgia (country)) E Gorgodze | 6 | 6
WC | (Brazil) C Bohrer Martins | 4 | 1
7 | (Argentina) S Sierra | 6 | 6
3 | (Argentina) M Capurro Taborda | 6 | 6
WC | (Uruguay) T Licht | 1 | 1
(Spain) L Romero Gormaz | 6^{5} | 3
(United States) R Montgomery | 7^{7} | 6
(United States) R Kingsley | 3 | 3
(Switzerland) Y In-Albon | 6 | 6
D Lodikova | 7^{7} | 6
8 | (Greece) V Grammatikopoulou | 6^{5} | 2

Second round
1 | (France) D Parry | 6 | 6
(Greece) D Papamichail | 1 | 2
(Georgia (country)) E Gorgodze | 3 | 6 | 3
7 | (Argentina) S Sierra | 6 | 3 | 6
3 | (Argentina) M Capurro Taborda | 1 | 3
(United States) R Montgomery | 6 | 6
(Switzerland) Y In-Albon | 6 | 7^{7}
D Lodikova | 2 | 6^{4}

Quarterfinals
1 | (France) D Parry | 2 | 6 | 6
7 | (Argentina) S Sierra | 6 | 4 | 0
(United States) R Montgomery | 6 | 6
(Switzerland) Y In-Albon | 2 | 1

Semifinals
1 | (France) D Parry | 7^{7} | 6
(United States) R Montgomery | 6^{5} | 3

=== Bottom half ===
First round
5 | (Argentina) ML Carlé | 6 | 6
(Ukraine) V Strakhova | 4 | 3
PR | (Slovenia) P Hercog | 7^{7} | 6
Q | (United States) V Lepchenko | 6^{2} | 2
(United States) J Loeb | 6 | 1 | 4
(Turkey) İ Öz | 2 | 6 | 6
(Brazil) C Meligeni Alves | 3 | 1
4 | (Argentina) J Riera | 6 | 6
6 | (Romania) M Bulgaru | 6 | 6
Q | (United States) A Rogers | 1 | 1
(Brazil) G Cé | 5 | 4
(Netherlands) E Vedder | 7 | 6
Q | (Romania) G Lee | 6 | 6
WC | (Uruguay) L de Santa Ana | 0 | 1
Q | (United States) H Giavara | 0 | 5
2 | (Mexico) R Zarazúa | 6 | 7

Second round
5 | (Argentina) ML Carlé | 6 | 6
PR | (Slovenia) P Hercog | 0 | 1
(Turkey) İ Öz | 6 | 4 | 3
4 | (Argentina) J Riera | 4 | 6 | 6
6 | (Romania) M Bulgaru | 3 | 6 | 6
(Netherlands) E Vedder | 6 | 2 | 2
Q | (Romania) G Lee | 0 | 0
2 | (Mexico) R Zarazúa | 6 | 6

Quarterfinals
5 | (Argentina) ML Carlé | 6 | 6
4 | (Argentina) J Riera | 4 | 0
6 | (Romania) M Bulgaru | 2 | 2
2 | (Mexico) R Zarazúa | 6 | 6

Semifinals
5 | (Argentina) ML Carlé | 1 | 6 | 5
2 | (Mexico) R Zarazúa | 6 | 2 | 7

== Qualifying ==
=== Seeds ===
1. (United States) Varvara Lepchenko (qualified)
2. (Romania) Gabriela Lee (qualified)
3. (United States) Haley Giavara (qualified)
4. (United States) Anna Rogers (qualified)

=== Qualifiers ===
1. (United States) Varvara Lepchenko
2. (Romania) Gabriela Lee
3. (United States) Haley Giavara
4. (United States) Anna Rogers

=== Qualifying draw ===
==== First qualifier ====
| Qualifying competition |
| 1 | (United States) Varvara Lepchenko | 7^{7} | 6 |
| WC | (Peru) Romina Ccuno | 6^{7} | 3 |

==== Second qualifier ====
| Qualifying competition |
| 2 | (Romania) Gabriela Lee | 6 | 6 |
| | (United States) Quinn Gleason | 3 | 3 |

==== Third qualifier ====
| Qualifying competition |
| 3 | (United States) Haley Giavara | 6 | 6 |
| WC | (Argentina) Julia Caffarena | 3 | 2 |

==== Fourth qualifier ====
| Qualifying competition |
| 4 | (United States) Anna Rogers | 6 | 6 |
| | (United Kingdom) Freya Christie | 1 | 1 |
