= 2023 Wiesbaden Tennis Open – Singles =

Singles
- 2023 Wiesbaden Tennis Open

Final
- Champion: Elina Avanesyan
- Runner-up: (Australia) Jaimee Fourlis
- Score: 6–2, 6–0

Events
Singles	Doubles
← 2022 ·	Wiesbaden Tennis Open	· 2024 →

Danka Kovinić was the defending champion but chose not to participate.

Elina Avanesyan won the title, defeating Jaimee Fourlis in the final, 6–2, 6–0.

== Seeds ==
1. (Estonia) Kaia Kanepi (second round)
2. (Australia) Kimberly Birrell (quarterfinals)
3. (Switzerland) Simona Waltert (semifinals)
4. (Australia) Olivia Gadecki (quarterfinals)
5. (Austria) Sinja Kraus (semifinals)
6. (Czech Republic) Sára Bejlek (first round)
7. Elina Avanesyan (champion)
8. (Australia) Jaimee Fourlis (final)

== Draw ==
Key

- Q = Qualifier
- WC = Wild card
- LL = Lucky loser
- Alt = Alternate
- ITF = ITF entry
- PR = Protected ranking
- SR = Special ranking
- SE = Special exempt
- JE = Junior exempt
- JR = Junior Accelerator Programme entrant
- CO = College Accelerator Programme entrant
- NG = Next Gen Accelerator Program entrant
- w/o = Walkover
- r = Retired
- d = Defaulted

=== Finals ===
Semifinals
7	Elina Avanesyan	6	6
5	(Austria) Sinja Kraus	1	1
3	(Switzerland) Simona Waltert	6	5	6^{4}
2	(Australia) Jaimee Fourlis	2	7	7^{7}

Final
7	Elina Avanesyan	6	6
2	(Australia) Jaimee Fourlis	2	0

=== Top half ===
First round
1	(Estonia) K Kanepi	6	6
WC	(Germany) Jo Steur	0	1
(Slovenia) D Jakupović	7^{7}	4	4
(Germany) S Lisicki	6^{4}	6	0^{r}
Q	A Anshba	6	2	6
(Germany) N Noha Akugue	2	6	4
WC	(Germany) E Seidel	3	5
7	E Avanesyan	6	7
4	(Australia) O Gadecki	6^{6}	6	6
(Netherlands) E Vedder	7^{8}	4	2
Q	(Germany) K Kanev	6	4	6
Q	J Avdeeva	2	6	4
WC	(Germany) J Middendorf	2	6^{5}
Q	M Melnikova	6	7^{7}
T Prozorova	4	4
5	(Austria) S Kraus	6	6

Second round
1	(Estonia) K Kanepi	3	2
(Slovenia) D Jakupović	6	6
Q	A Anshba	0	2
7	E Avanesyan	6	6
4	(Australia) O Gadecki	4	7^{7}	6
Q	(Germany) K Kanev	6	6^{5}	1
Q	M Melnikova	3	1
5	(Austria) S Kraus	6	6

Quarterfinals
(Slovenia) D Jakupović	6	3	6^{3}
7	E Avanesyan	3	6	7^{7}
4	(Australia) O Gadecki	1	6^{10}
5	(Austria) S Kraus	6	7^{12}

Semifinals
7	E Avanesyan	6	6
5	(Austria) S Kraus	1	1

=== Bottom half ===
First round
6	(Czech Republic) S Bejlek	6	4	4
Q	(France) L Boisson	1	6	6
(Romania) A Cadanțu-Ignatik	0	2
(Belgium) M Kempen	6	6
Q	K Laskutova	4	2
(Belgium) Y Wickmayer	6	6
(Serbia) N Stevanović	4	7	4
3	(Switzerland) S Waltert	6	5	6
8	(Australia) J Fourlis	6	6
WC	(Germany) M Guth	4	3
(Germany) M Barthel	6	3	6
Q	(Germany) A Klasen	4	6	3
Q	(Bulgaria) G Topalova	3	4
E Makarova	6	6
(United States) A Muhammad	1	4
2	(Australia) K Birrell	6	6

Second round
Q	(France) L Boisson	6	6
(Belgium) M Kempen	4	4
(Belgium) Y Wickmayer	6	3	6^{3}
3	(Switzerland) S Waltert	1	6	7^{7}
8	(Australia) J Fourlis	6	6
(Germany) M Barthel	4	2
E Makarova	3	2
2	(Australia) K Birrell	6	6

Quarterfinals
Q	(France) L Boisson	4	5
3	(Switzerland) S Waltert	6	7
8	(Australia) J Fourlis	6	6
2	(Australia) K Birrell	4	2

Semifinals
3	(Switzerland) S Waltert	6	5	6^{4}
8	(Australia) J Fourlis	2	7	7^{7}
