= 2019 Wiesbaden Tennis Open =

- Date: 29 April–5 May 2019
- Edition: 11th
- Category: ITF Women's World Tennis Tour
- Prize money: $60,000
- Surface: Clay
- Location: Wiesbaden, Germany

Champions

Singles
- (Czech Republic) Barbora Krejčíková

Doubles
- (Russia) Anna Blinkova / (Belgium) Yanina Wickmayer
← 2018 ·	Wiesbaden Tennis Open	· 2021 →

The 2019 Wiesbaden Tennis Open was a professional tennis tournament played on outdoor clay courts. It was the eleventh edition of the tournament which was part of the 2019 ITF Women's World Tennis Tour. It took place in Wiesbaden, Germany between 29 April and 5 May 2019.

== Singles main-draw entrants ==
=== Seeds ===
Country	Player	Rank^{1}	Seed
RUS	Anna Blinkova	121	1
NED	Arantxa Rus	127	2
ISR	Julia Glushko	129	3
CZE	Barbora Krejčíková	138	4
BEL	Yanina Wickmayer	139	5
UKR	Katarina Zavatska	172	6
NED	Richèl Hogenkamp	176	7
GER	Anna Zaja	193	8

- ^{1} Rankings are as of 22 April 2019.

=== Other entrants ===
The following players received wildcards into the singles main draw:

- (Austria) Mira Antonitsch
- (Germany) Katharina Gerlach
- (Germany) Kathleen Kanev
- (Germany) Stephanie Wagner

The following player received entry using a junior exempt:

- (Denmark) Clara Tauson

The following player received entry by a special exempt:

- (United States) Elizabeth Halbauer

The following players received entry from the qualifying draw:

- (Australia) Jaimee Fourlis
- (France) Julie Gervais
- (Hungary) Réka Luca Jani
- (Luxembourg) Eléonora Molinaro
- (Romania) Laura-Ioana Paar
- (Belgium) Hélène Scholsen

== Champions ==
=== Singles ===
- (Czech Republic) Barbora Krejčíková def. (Ukraine) Katarina Zavatska, 6–4, 7–6^{(7–2)}

=== Doubles ===
- (Russia) Anna Blinkova / (Belgium) Yanina Wickmayer def. (Australia) Jaimee Fourlis / (Liechtenstein) Kathinka von Deichmann, 6–3, 4–6, [10–3]
