= 2021 Wiesbaden Tennis Open – Singles =

Tennis event

Singles
- 2021 Wiesbaden Tennis Open

Final
- Champion: (Hungary) Anna Bondár
- Runner-up: (France) Clara Burel
- Score: 6–2, 6–4

Events
Singles	Doubles
← 2019 ·	Wiesbaden Tennis Open	· 2022 →

Barbora Krejčíková was the defending champion but chose not to participate.

Anna Bondár won the title, defeating Clara Burel in the final, 6–2, 6–4.

== Seeds ==
1. (France) Clara Burel (final)
2. (Spain) Cristina Bucșa (first round)
3. (Hungary) Anna Bondár (champion)
4. (Russia) Marina Melnikova (second round)
5. (Hungary) Réka Luca Jani (first round)
6. (Italy) Giulia Gatto-Monticone (second round)
7. (Italy) Lucrezia Stefanini (quarterfinals)
8. (Italy) Federica Di Sarra (quarterfinals, retired)

== Draw ==
Key

- Q = Qualifier
- WC = Wild card
- LL = Lucky loser
- Alt = Alternate
- ITF = ITF entry
- PR = Protected ranking
- SR = Special ranking
- SE = Special exempt
- JE = Junior exempt
- JR = Junior Accelerator Programme entrant
- CO = College Accelerator Programme entrant
- NG = Next Gen Accelerator Program entrant
- w/o = Walkover
- r = Retired
- d = Defaulted

=== Finals ===
Semifinals
1	(France) Clara Burel	4	6	6
Q	(North Macedonia) Lina Gjorcheska	6	4	4
3	(Hungary) Anna Bondár	6	6
(Switzerland) Conny Perrin	2	3

Final
1	(France) Clara Burel	2	4
3	(Hungary) Anna Bondár	6	6

=== Top half ===
First round
1	(France) C Burel	7^{7}	6
Q	(Latvia) K Bartone	6^{3}	2
Q	(Germany) L Papadakis	6	6
WC	(Germany) LI Putz	2	0
(Romania) A Ignatik	6	6
(Croatia) T Mrdeža	3	1
(Italy) M Di Giuseppe	7^{7}	7^{7}
5	(Hungary) RL Jani	6^{3}	6^{4}
4	(Russia) M Melnikova	7	6
(Germany) A Zaja	5	1
(Italy) B Turati	6^{3}	7	6^{5}
Q	(North Macedonia) L Gjorcheska	7^{7}	5	7^{7}
LL	(Germany) Y Morderger	7^{7}	1	3
WC	(Germany) A Klasen	6^{4}	6	6
(Croatia) T Lukas	3	2
8	(Italy) F Di Sarra	6	6

Second round
1	(France) C Burel	6	6^{4}	6
Q	(Germany) L Papadakis	2	7^{7}	0
(Romania) A Ignatik	6	6
(Italy) M Di Giuseppe	2	3
4	(Russia) M Melnikova	3	5
Q	(North Macedonia) L Gjorcheska	6	7
WC	(Germany) A Klasen	4	5
8	(Italy) F Di Sarra	6	7

Quarterfinals
1	(France) C Burel	7^{7}	6
(Romania) A Ignatik	6^{2}	4
Q	(North Macedonia) L Gjorcheska	6	2
8	(Italy) F Di Sarra	1	0^{r}

Semifinals
1	(France) C Burel	4	6	6
Q	(North Macedonia) L Gjorcheska	6	4	4

=== Bottom half ===
First round
7	(Italy) L Stefanini	2	6	6
Q	(Bosnia and Herzegovina) N Berberović	6	4	1
WC	(Germany) K Kanev	3	0
Q	(Germany) S Wagner	6	6
(Switzerland) S Bandecchi	6^{5}	6	4
JE	(Andorra) V Jiménez Kasintseva	7^{7}	4	6
Q	(Italy) C Ferrando	0^{r}
3	(Hungary) A Bondár	5
6	(Italy) G Gatto-Monticone	2	6	6
Q	(Netherlands) A Hartono	6	1	2
(Switzerland) C Perrin	6	6
Q	(Romania) A Roșca	4	1
WC	(Germany) M Hodzic	1	2
(Germany) K Gerlach	6	6
(Switzerland) Y In-Albon	6	7
2	(Spain) C Bucșa	4	5

Second round
7	(Italy) L Stefanini	6	6^{4}	6
Q	(Germany) S Wagner	1	7^{7}	1
JE	(Andorra) V Jiménez Kasintseva	2	2^{r}
3	(Hungary) A Bondár	6	3
6	(Italy) G Gatto-Monticone	0	0
(Switzerland) C Perrin	6	6
(Germany) K Gerlach	2	4
(Switzerland) Y In-Albon	6	6

Quarterfinals
7	(Italy) L Stefanini	3	3
3	(Hungary) A Bondár	6	6
(Switzerland) C Perrin	6	6
(Switzerland) Y In-Albon	1	3

Semifinals
3	(Hungary) A Bondár	6	6
(Switzerland) C Perrin	2	3
