= 2022 Wiesbaden Tennis Open – Doubles =

Doubles
- 2022 Wiesbaden Tennis Open

Final
- Champions: Amina Anshba (Hungary) Panna Udvardy
- Runners-up: (Venezuela) Andrea Gámiz (Netherlands) Eva Vedder
- Score: 6–2, 6–4

Events
Singles	Doubles
← 2021 ·	Wiesbaden Tennis Open	· 2023 →

Anna Bondár and Lara Salden were the defending champions, but both players chose not to participate.

Amina Anshba and Panna Udvardy won the title, defeating Andrea Gámiz and Eva Vedder in the final, 6–2, 6–4.

== Seeds ==
1. (United States) Kaitlyn Christian / Lidziya Marozava (semifinals)
2. (United Kingdom) Alicia Barnett / (United Kingdom) Olivia Nicholls (semifinals)
3. (France) Kristina Mladenovic / (Netherlands) Arantxa Rus (first round, withdrew)
4. Amina Anshba / (Hungary) Panna Udvardy (champions)

== Draw ==
Key

- Q = Qualifier
- WC = Wild card
- LL = Lucky loser
- Alt = Alternate
- ITF = ITF entry
- PR = Protected ranking
- SR = Special ranking
- SE = Special exempt
- JE = Junior exempt
- JR = Junior Accelerator Programme entrant
- CO = College Accelerator Programme entrant
- NG = Next Gen Accelerator Program entrant
- w/o = Walkover
- r = Retired
- d = Defaulted

=== Draw ===
First round
1	(United States) K Christian; L Marozava	6	6
(Germany) K Gerlach (Chile) D Seguel	1	2
(Slovenia) D Jakupović (Belgium) K Zimmermann	1	4
O Selekhmeteva (Latvia) D Vismane	6	6
4	A Anshba (Hungary) P Udvardy	6	6
WC	(Germany) L Böhner (Germany) K Kanev	2	1
(United Kingdom) H Dart (United Kingdom) K Swan	4	5
(Netherlands) I Haverlag (Lithuania) J Mikulskytė	6	7
WC	(Germany) A Klasen (Romania) A Roșca	1	3
(Venezuela) A Gámiz (Netherlands) E Vedder	6	6
WC	(Bulgaria) J Terziyska (United States) V Wolff	w/o
3	(France) K Mladenovic (Netherlands) A Rus
(Indonesia) B Gumulya (Netherlands) A Hartono	6	6
(Georgia (country)) O Kalashnikova; E Makarova	2	2
(Uzbekistan) A Amanmuradova; A Fomina-Klotz	1	1
2	(United Kingdom) A Barnett (United Kingdom) O Nicholls	6	6

Quarterfinals
1	(United States) K Christian; L Marozava	6	6
O Selekhmeteva (Latvia) D Vismane	3	3
4	A Anshba (Hungary) P Udvardy	6	6
(Netherlands) I Haverlag (Lithuania) J Mikulskytė	0	1
(Venezuela) A Gámiz (Netherlands) E Vedder	4	6	[10]
WC	(Bulgaria) J Terziyska (United States) V Wolff	6	1	[3]
(Indonesia) B Gumulya (Netherlands) A Hartono	4	1
2	(United Kingdom) A Barnett (United Kingdom) O Nicholls	6	6

Semifinals
1	(United States) K Christian; L Marozava	6^{2}	4
4	A Anshba (Hungary) P Udvardy	7^{7}	6
(Venezuela) A Gámiz (Netherlands) E Vedder	6	6
2	(United Kingdom) A Barnett (United Kingdom) O Nicholls	1	3

Final
4	A Anshba (Hungary) P Udvardy	6	6
(Venezuela) A Gámiz (Netherlands) E Vedder	2	4
