= 2021 Wiesbaden Tennis Open – Doubles =

Tennis tournament in Germany

Doubles
- 2021 Wiesbaden Tennis Open

Final
- Champions: (Hungary) Anna Bondár (Belgium) Lara Salden
- Runners-up: (Netherlands) Arianne Hartono (Australia) Olivia Tjandramulia
- Score: 6–7^{(9–11)}, 6–2, [10–4]

Events
Singles	Doubles
← 2019 ·	Wiesbaden Tennis Open	· 2022 →

Anna Blinkova and Yanina Wickmayer were the defending champions but chose not to participate.

Anna Bondár and Lara Salden won the title, defeating Arianne Hartono and Olivia Tjandramulia in the final, 6–7^{(9–11)}, 6–2, [10–4].

== Seeds ==
1. (North Macedonia) Lina Gjorcheska / (Switzerland) Xenia Knoll (quarterfinals)
2. (Hungary) Réka Luca Jani / (Ukraine) Valeriya Strakhova (first round)
3. (Russia) Marina Melnikova / (Switzerland) Conny Perrin (quarterfinals)
4. (Hungary) Anna Bondár / (Belgium) Lara Salden (champions)

== Draw ==
Key

- Q = Qualifier
- WC = Wild card
- LL = Lucky loser
- Alt = Alternate
- ITF = ITF entry
- PR = Protected ranking
- SR = Special ranking
- SE = Special exempt
- JE = Junior exempt
- JR = Junior Accelerator Programme entrant
- CO = College Accelerator Programme entrant
- NG = Next Gen Accelerator Program entrant
- w/o = Walkover
- r = Retired
- d = Defaulted

=== Draw ===
First round
(Russia) E Kazionova (Russia) E Makarova	6^{5}	6^{3}
(Germany) A Klasen (Germany) A Zaja	7^{7}	7^{7}
4	(Hungary) A Bondár (Belgium) L Salden	6	6
(Germany) T Morderger (Germany) Y Morderger	4	2
(Latvia) D Marcinkēviča (United States) C Scholl	6	6^{3}	[9]
(Italy) M Di Giuseppe (Italy) G Gatto-Monticone	4	7^{7}	[11]
(Netherlands) A Hartono (Australia) O Tjandramulia	6	6
(Latvia) K Bartone (Ukraine) G Poznikhirenko	1	3
(Netherlands) H Lodewijks (Netherlands) K van der Heijden	3	0
3	(Russia) M Melnikova (Switzerland) C Perrin	6	6
(Spain) C Bucșa (Croatia) T Mrdeža	3	4
(Turkey) İ Öz (Slovenia) N Radišić	6	6
(Italy) A Turati (Italy) B Turati	6^{5}	6	[10]
2	(Hungary) RL Jani (Ukraine) V Strakhova	7^{7}	3	[4]

Quarterfinals
1	(North Macedonia) L Gjorcheska (Switzerland) X Knoll	1	4
(Germany) A Klasen (Germany) A Zaja	6	6
4	(Hungary) A Bondár (Belgium) L Salden	6	6
(Italy) M Di Giuseppe (Italy) G Gatto-Monticone	2	2
(Netherlands) A Hartono (Australia) O Tjandramulia	6	6
3	(Russia) M Melnikova (Switzerland) C Perrin	4	3
(Turkey) İ Öz (Slovenia) N Radišić	6	6
(Italy) A Turati (Italy) B Turati	0	2

Semifinals
(Germany) A Klasen (Germany) A Zaja	3	1
4	(Hungary) A Bondár (Belgium) L Salden	6	6
(Netherlands) A Hartono (Australia) O Tjandramulia	6	6
(Turkey) İ Öz (Slovenia) N Radišić	3	3

Final
4	(Hungary) A Bondár (Belgium) L Salden	6^{9}	6	[10]
(Netherlands) A Hartono (Australia) O Tjandramulia	7^{11}	2	[4]
