= 2024 Wiesbaden Tennis Open =

Tennis tournament

- Date: 29 April–5 May 2024
- Edition: 15th
- Category: ITF Women's World Tennis Tour
- Prize money: $100,000
- Surface: Clay / Outdoor
- Location: Wiesbaden, Germany

Champions

Singles
- (Argentina) Julia Riera

Doubles
- (United Kingdom) Samantha Murray Sharan / (Brazil) Laura Pigossi
← 2023 ·	Wiesbaden Tennis Open	· 2025 →

The 2024 Wiesbaden Tennis Open was a professional tennis tournament played on outdoor clay courts. It was the fifteenth edition of the tournament, which was part of the 2024 ITF Women's World Tennis Tour. It took place in Wiesbaden, Germany, between 29 April and 5 May 2024.

== Champions ==
=== Singles ===
- (Argentina) Julia Riera def. (Germany) Jule Niemeier, 3–6, 6–3, 6–2

=== Doubles ===
- (United Kingdom) Samantha Murray Sharan / (Brazil) Laura Pigossi def. (Japan) Himeno Sakatsume / (Bosnia and Herzegovina) Anita Wagner, 7–5, 6–2

== Singles main draw entrants ==
=== Seeds ===
Country	Player	Rank	Seed
ARG	Julia Riera	94	1
HUN	Anna Bondár	95	2
GER	Jule Niemeier	111	3
LAT	Darja Semeņistaja	113	4
BRA	Laura Pigossi	124	5
ROU	Irina-Camelia Begu	128	6
AUT	Julia Grabher	132	7
SLO	Tamara Zidanšek	135	8

- Rankings are as of 22 April 2024.

=== Other entrants ===
The following players received wildcards into the singles main draw:

- (Germany) Mara Guth
- (Germany) Julia Middendorf
- (Germany) Nastasja Schunk
- (Germany) Marie Vogt

The following players received entry from the qualifying draw:

- Julia Avdeeva
- ~~(Poland) Maja Chwalińska~~
- (Slovenia) Veronika Erjavec
- (Poland) Gina Feistel
- (Germany) Anna Gabric
- (Romania) Andreea Mitu
- (Czech Republic) Barbora Palicová
- (Spain) Leyre Romero Gormaz

The following players received entry as lucky losers:

- (Turkey) İpek Öz
- (Ukraine) Katarina Zavatska
