= 2022 Wiesbaden Tennis Open =

Tennis tournament

- Date: 2–8 May 2022
- Edition: 13th
- Category: ITF Women's World Tennis Tour
- Prize money: $100,000
- Surface: Clay / Outdoor
- Location: Wiesbaden, Germany

Champions

Singles
- (Montenegro) Danka Kovinić

Doubles
- Amina Anshba / (Hungary) Panna Udvardy
← 2021 ·	Wiesbaden Tennis Open	· 2023 →

The 2022 Wiesbaden Tennis Open was a professional tennis tournament played on outdoor clay courts. It was the thirteenth edition of the tournament which was part of the 2022 ITF Women's World Tennis Tour. It took place in Wiesbaden, Germany between 2 and 8 May 2022.

== Singles main draw entrants ==
=== Seeds ===
Country	Player	Rank^{1}	Seed
NED	Arantxa Rus	74	1
SWE	Rebecca Peterson	76	2
HUN	Panna Udvardy	83	3
FRA	Clara Burel	84	4
FRA	Kristina Mladenovic	99	5
GBR	Harriet Dart	102	6
CRO	Donna Vekić	108	7
GER	Jule Niemeier	110	8

- ^{1} Rankings are as of 25 April 2022.

=== Other entrants ===
The following players received wildcards into the singles main draw:

- (Germany) Kathleen Kanev
- (Germany) Eva Lys
- (Germany) Julia Middendorf
- (Germany) Laura Siegemund

The following players received entry from the qualifying draw:

- (Slovenia) Dalila Jakupović
- (Austria) Sinja Kraus
- Ekaterina Makarova
- (Lithuania) Justina Mikulskytė
- (Romania) Andreea Roșca
- (Germany) Joëlle Steur
- (Netherlands) Eva Vedder
- (Latvia) Daniela Vismane

== Champions ==
=== Singles ===
- (Montenegro) Danka Kovinić def. (Germany) Nastasja Schunk, 6–3, 7–6^{(7–0)}

=== Doubles ===
- Amina Anshba / (Hungary) Panna Udvardy def. (Venezuela) Andrea Gámiz / (Netherlands) Eva Vedder, 6–2, 6–4
