= 2023 Wiesbaden Tennis Open =

Tennis tournament

- Date: 1–7 May 2023
- Edition: 14th
- Category: ITF Women's World Tennis Tour
- Prize money: $100,000
- Surface: Clay / Outdoor
- Location: Wiesbaden, Germany

Champions

Singles
- Elina Avanesyan

Doubles
- (Australia) Jaimee Fourlis / (Australia) Olivia Gadecki
← 2022 ·	Wiesbaden Tennis Open	· 2024 →

The 2023 Wiesbaden Tennis Open was a professional tennis tournament played on outdoor clay courts. It was the fourteenth edition of the tournament, which was part of the 2023 ITF Women's World Tennis Tour. It took place in Wiesbaden, Germany, between 1 and 7 May 2023.

== Champions ==
=== Singles ===
- Elina Avanesyan def. (Australia) Jaimee Fourlis, 6–2, 6–0

=== Doubles ===
- (Australia) Jaimee Fourlis / (Australia) Olivia Gadecki def. (United Kingdom) Emily Appleton / (Germany) Julia Lohoff, 6–1, 6–4

== Singles main draw entrants ==
=== Seeds ===
Country	Player	Rank	Seed
EST	Kaia Kanepi	63	1
AUS	Kimberly Birrell	113	2
SUI	Simona Waltert	133	3
AUS	Olivia Gadecki	151	4
AUT	Sinja Kraus	153	5
CZE	Sára Bejlek	157	6
	Elina Avanesyan	166	7
AUS	Jaimee Fourlis	179	8

- Rankings are as of 24 April 2023.

=== Other entrants ===
The following players received wildcards into the singles main draw:

- (Germany) Mara Guth
- (Germany) Julia Middendorf
- (Germany) Ella Seidel
- (Germany) Joëlle Steur

The following players received entry through the qualifying draw:

- Amina Anshba
- Julia Avdeeva
- (France) Loïs Boisson
- (Germany) Kathleen Kanev
- (Germany) Anna Klasen
- Ksenia Laskutova
- Marina Melnikova
- (Bulgaria) Gergana Topalova
