= 2019 Wiesbaden Tennis Open – Singles =

Singles
- 2019 Wiesbaden Tennis Open

Final
- Champion: (Czech Republic) Barbora Krejčíková
- Runner-up: (Ukraine) Katarina Zavatska
- Score: 6–4, 7–6^{(7–2)}

Events
Singles	Doubles
← 2018 ·	Wiesbaden Tennis Open	· 2021 →

Kathinka von Deichmann was the defending champion, but lost to Arantxa Rus in the second round.

Barbora Krejčíková won the title, defeating Katarina Zavatska in the final, 6–4, 7–6^{(7–2)}.

== Seeds ==
1. (Russia) Anna Blinkova (semifinals)
2. (Netherlands) Arantxa Rus (quarterfinals)
3. (Israel) Julia Glushko (first round)
4. (Czech Republic) Barbora Krejčíková (champion)
5. (Belgium) Yanina Wickmayer (second round)
6. (Ukraine) Katarina Zavatska (final)
7. (Netherlands) Richèl Hogenkamp (first round)
8. (Germany) Anna Zaja (second round)

== Draw ==
Key

- Q = Qualifier
- WC = Wild card
- LL = Lucky loser
- Alt = Alternate
- ITF = ITF entry
- PR = Protected ranking
- SR = Special ranking
- SE = Special exempt
- JE = Junior exempt
- JR = Junior Accelerator Programme entrant
- CO = College Accelerator Programme entrant
- NG = Next Gen Accelerator Program entrant
- w/o = Walkover
- r = Retired
- d = Defaulted

=== Finals ===
Semifinals
1	(Russia) Anna Blinkova	0	2
4	(Czech Republic) Barbora Krejčíková	6	6
(Chile) Daniela Seguel	2	5
6	(Ukraine) Katarina Zavatska	6	7

Final
4	(Czech Republic) Barbora Krejčíková	6	7^{7}
6	(Ukraine) Katarina Zavatska	4	6^{2}

=== Top half ===
First round
1	(Russia) A Blinkova	6	4	6
(Netherlands) Q Lemoine	3	6	4
(France) M Georges	4	1
WC	(Austria) M Antonitsch	6	6
(Serbia) D Radanović	6	6
(Ukraine) D Lopatetska	3	3
WC	(Germany) K Gerlach	4	6	0
8	(Germany) A Zaja	6	3	6
4	(Czech Republic) B Krejčíková	6	6
(France) A Hesse	1	2
Q	(Belgium) H Scholsen	6	6^{2}	7^{7}
(Austria) J Grabher	3	7^{7}	6^{4}
(Turkey) Ç Büyükakçay	7^{8}	4	6
Q	(Luxembourg) E Molinaro	6^{6}	6	1
WC	(Germany) S Wagner	6	1^{r}
5	(Belgium) Y Wickmayer	1	4

Second round
1	(Russia) A Blinkova	6	6
WC	(Austria) M Antonitsch	0	3
(Serbia) D Radanović	4	6	6
8	(Germany) A Zaja	6	4	2
4	(Czech Republic) B Krejčíková	6	6
Q	(Belgium) H Scholsen	1	2
(Turkey) Ç Büyükakçay	6	3	7^{7}
5	(Belgium) Y Wickmayer	1	6	6^{3}

Quarterfinals
1	(Russia) A Blinkova	6	3	6
(Serbia) D Radanović	4	6	1
4	(Czech Republic) B Krejčíková	6	6
(Turkey) Ç Büyükakçay	1	1

Semifinals
1	(Russia) A Blinkova	0	2
4	(Czech Republic) B Krejčíková	6	6

=== Bottom half ===
First round
7	(Netherlands) R Hogenkamp	2	6	6^{1}
Q	(Hungary) RL Jani	6	4	7^{7}
Q	(Australia) J Fourlis	5	6	6
Q	(Romania) L-I Paar	7	2	2
(France) C Paquet	6	6
WC	(Germany) K Kanev	4	2
(Chile) D Seguel	6	1	6
3	(Israel) J Glushko	4	6	4
6	(Ukraine) K Zavatska	6	2	6
JE	(Denmark) C Tauson	4	6	2
(Greece) V Grammatikopoulou	6	1	6
Q	(France) J Gervais	3	6	4
(Argentina) N Podoroska	2	2
(Liechtenstein) K von Deichmann	6	6
SE	(United States) E Halbauer	4	7	3
2	(Netherlands) A Rus	6	5	6

Second round
Q	(Hungary) RL Jani	1	3
Q	(Australia) J Fourlis	6	6
(France) C Paquet	6	4	3
(Chile) D Seguel	3	6	6
6	(Ukraine) K Zavatska	6	4	6
(Greece) V Grammatikopoulou	4	6	2
(Liechtenstein) K von Deichmann	6	3	3
2	(Netherlands) A Rus	3	6	6

Quarterfinals
Q	(Australia) J Fourlis	3	3
(Chile) D Seguel	6	6
6	(Ukraine) K Zavatska	6	7^{7}
2	(Netherlands) A Rus	3	6^{4}

Semifinals
(Chile) D Seguel	2	5
6	(Ukraine) K Zavatska	6	7
