= 2026 Wiesbaden Tennis Open – Singles =

Singles
- 2026 Wiesbaden Tennis Open

Final
- Champion: (Germany) Noma Noha Akugue
- Runner-up: (Slovakia) Mia Pohánková
- Score: 6–2, 7–6^{(7–3)}

Events
Singles	Doubles
- Wiesbaden Tennis Open

Anna Bondár was the defending champion but chose not to participate.

Noma Noha Akugue won the singles title at the 2026 Wiesbaden Tennis Open, defeating Mia Pohánková in the final, 6–2, 7–6^{(7–3)}.

== Seeds ==
1. (Belgium) Hanne Vandewinkel (first round)
2. (Switzerland) Simona Waltert (second round)
3. (Germany) Ella Seidel (first round)
4. (United Kingdom) Francesca Jones (semifinals)
5. (Austria) Sinja Kraus (quarterfinals)
6. (Austria) Julia Grabher (quarterfinals)
7. (Latvia) Darja Semeņistaja (quarterfinals)
8. (Uzbekistan) Maria Timofeeva (first round)

== Draw ==
Key

- Q = Qualifier
- WC = Wild card
- LL = Lucky loser
- Alt = Alternate
- ITF = ITF entry
- PR = Protected ranking
- SR = Special ranking
- SE = Special exempt
- JE = Junior exempt
- JR = Junior Accelerator Programme entrant
- CO = College Accelerator Programme entrant
- NG = Next Gen Accelerator Program entrant
- w/o = Walkover
- r = Retired
- d = Defaulted

=== Finals ===
Semifinals
Q	(Belgium) Jeline Vandromme	6^{5}	4
(Germany) Noma Noha Akugue	7^{7}	6
4	(United Kingdom) Francesca Jones	6	4	6^{3}
(Slovakia) Mia Pohánková	1	6	7^{7}

Final
(Germany) Noma Noha Akugue	6	7^{7}
(Slovakia) Mia Pohánková	2	6^{3}

=== Top half ===
First round
1	(Belgium) H Vandewinkel	2	0
Q	E Andreeva	6	6
Q	(Belgium) J Vandromme	6	6
Q	(Ukraine) P Skliar	4	4
(Poland) L Klimovičová	2	2
Q	(Armenia) E Avanesyan	6	6
(Czech Republic) A Sisková	6	1	3
5	(Austria) S Kraus	2	6	6
3	(Germany) E Seidel	7^{7}	5	4
(Germany) N Noha Akugue	6^{3}	7	6
A Falei	3	6	5
WC	(Germany) A-L Friedsam	6	4	7
Q	(Bulgaria) E Yaneva	6	7
LL	(Sweden) C Hennemann	3	5
(Czech Republic) L Havlíčková	4	2
7	(Latvia) D Semeņistaja	6	6

Second round
Q	E Andreeva	6	4	0^{r}
Q	(Belgium) J Vandromme	1	6	2
Q	(Armenia) E Avanesyan
5	(Austria) S Kraus	w/o
(Germany) N Noha Akugue	6	6
WC	(Germany) A-L Friedsam	3	2
Q	(Bulgaria) E Yaneva	5	4
7	(Latvia) D Semeņistaja	7	6

Quarterfinals
Q	(Belgium) J Vandromme	2	7	7
5	(Austria) S Kraus	6	5	5
(Germany) N Noha Akugue	0	6	6
7	(Latvia) D Semeņistaja	6	3	3

Semifinals
Q	(Belgium) J Vandromme	6^{5}	4
(Germany) N Noha Akugue	7^{7}	6

=== Bottom half ===
First round
6	(Austria) J Grabher	4	7^{7}	6
WC	(Germany) J Niemeier	6	6^{4}	3
A Gasanova	6	6
(Romania) M Bulgaru	2	2
WC	(Germany) E Bennemann	1	6^{3}
(Italy) L Bronzetti	6	7^{7}
Q	(Germany) E Seibold	2	1
4	(United Kingdom) F Jones	6	6
8	(Uzbekistan) M Timofeeva	6^{5}	2
WC	(Germany) T Brockmann	7^{7}	6
Q	(Germany) M Hodzic	6	2	3
(United States) CYS Lee	4	6	6
(Germany) M Barthel	5	6	6^{5}
(Slovakia) M Pohánková	7	3	7^{7}
Q	(Croatia) L Ćirić Bagarić	5	6	3
2	(Switzerland) S Waltert	7	4	6

Second round
6	(Austria) J Grabher	6	1	6
A Gasanova	3	6	2
(Italy) L Bronzetti	2	6	4
4	(United Kingdom) F Jones	6	4	6
WC	(Germany) T Brockmann	7^{9}	4	6
(United States) CYS Lee	6^{7}	6	3
(Slovakia) M Pohánková	3	7^{10}	6
2	(Switzerland) S Waltert	6	6^{8}	1

Quarterfinals
6	(Austria) J Grabher	5	2
4	(United Kingdom) F Jones	7	6
WC	(Germany) T Brockmann	6^{6}	2
(Slovakia) M Pohánková	7^{8}	6

Semifinals
4	(United Kingdom) F Jones	6	4	6^{3}
(Slovakia) M Pohánková	1	6	7^{7}
