= Montevideo Open =

- 2023 Montevideo Open

Defunct tennis tournament
- Location: Montevideo, Uruguay
- Venue: Carrasco Lawn Tennis Club
- Surface: Clay / Outdoors

Current champions (2023)
- Singles: (Mexico) Renata Zarazúa
- Doubles: (Argentina) María Lourdes Carlé (Argentina) Julia Riera
WTA Tour
- Category: WTA 125
- Draw: 32S / 8Q / 16D
- Prize money: $115,000

The Montevideo Open was a women's tennis tournament held in Montevideo, Uruguay from 2021 to 2023 as part of the WTA 125 series. It was played at the Carrasco Lawn Tennis Club on outdoor clay courts. The event was promoted by Tennium alongside sister tournaments in Buenos Aires, Colina and Florianópolis.

== Past finals ==
=== Singles ===
Year	Champion	Runner-up	Score
2021	(France) Diane Parry	(Hungary) Panna Udvardy	6–3, 6–2
2022	Diana Shnaider	(France) Léolia Jeanjean	6–4, 6–4
2023	(Mexico) Renata Zarazúa	(France) Diane Parry	7–5, 3–6, 6–4

=== Doubles ===
Year	Champions	Runners-up	Score
2021	(Romania) Irina Bara (Georgia (country)) Ekaterine Gorgodze	(Brazil) Carolina Alves (Spain) Marina Bassols Ribera	6–4, 6–3
2022	(Brazil) Ingrid Gamarra Martins (Brazil) Luisa Stefani	(United States) Quinn Gleason (France) Elixane Lechemia	7–5, 6–7^{(6–8)}, [10–6]
2023	(Argentina) María Lourdes Carlé (Argentina) Julia Riera	(United Kingdom) Freya Christie (Colombia) Yuliana Lizarazo	7–6^{(7–5)}, 7–5

== See also ==
- Uruguay Open
