= 2024 Wiesbaden Tennis Open – Singles =

Singles
- 2024 Wiesbaden Tennis Open

Final
- Champion: (Argentina) Julia Riera
- Runner-up: (Germany) Jule Niemeier
- Score: 3–6, 6–3, 6–2

Events
Singles	Doubles
← 2023 ·	Wiesbaden Tennis Open	· 2025 →

Elina Avanesyan was the defending champion but chose not to participate.

Julia Riera won the title, defeating Jule Niemeier in the final, 3–6, 6–3, 6–2.

== Seeds ==
1. (Argentina) Julia Riera (champion)
2. (Hungary) Anna Bondár (second round)
3. (Germany) Jule Niemeier (final)
4. (Latvia) Darja Semeņistaja (semifinals)
5. (Brazil) Laura Pigossi (second round)
6. (Romania) Irina-Camelia Begu (semifinals)
7. (Austria) Julia Grabher (first round)
8. (Slovenia) Tamara Zidanšek (first round)

== Draw ==
Key

- Q = Qualifier
- WC = Wild card
- LL = Lucky loser
- Alt = Alternate
- ITF = ITF entry
- PR = Protected ranking
- SR = Special ranking
- SE = Special exempt
- JE = Junior exempt
- JR = Junior Accelerator Programme entrant
- CO = College Accelerator Programme entrant
- NG = Next Gen Accelerator Program entrant
- w/o = Walkover
- r = Retired
- d = Defaulted

=== Finals ===
Semifinals
1	(Argentina) Julia Riera	6	4	6
4	(Latvia) Darja Semeņistaja	2	6	4
3	(Germany) Jule Niemeier	6	6
6	(Romania) Irina-Camelia Begu	1	3

Final
1	(Argentina) Julia Riera	3	6	6
3	(Germany) Jule Niemeier	6	3	2

=== Top half ===
First round
1	(Argentina) J Riera	6	7
(Hungary) D Gálfi	1	5
(Hungary) P Udvardy	6	2	6
Q	(Romania) A Mitu	1	6	0
Q	(Spain) L Romero Gormaz	6	6
WC	(Germany) M Vogt	1	2
Q	(Germany) A Gabric	6	6
7	(Austria) J Grabher	2	1
4	(Latvia) D Semeņistaja	6	6
(Cyprus) R Șerban	4	1
Q	(Poland) G Feistel	6	6
Q	(Czech Republic) B Palicová	1	2
Q	(Slovenia) V Erjavec	6	6
LL	(Turkey) İ Öz	2	1
WC	(Germany) N Schunk	6	4	6
8	(Slovenia) T Zidanšek	2	6	3

Second round
1	(Argentina) J Riera	6	6
(Hungary) P Udvardy	4	0
Q	(Spain) L Romero Gormaz	6	6^{5}	6
Q	(Germany) A Gabric	3	7^{7}	0
4	(Latvia) D Semeņistaja	6^{6}	7	6
Q	(Poland) G Feistel	7^{8}	5	2
Q	(Slovenia) V Erjavec	6	6
WC	(Germany) N Schunk	0	2

Quarterfinals
1	(Argentina) J Riera	6	6
Q	(Spain) L Romero Gormaz	2	0
4	(Latvia) D Semeņistaja	5	7	6
Q	(Slovenia) V Erjavec	7	5	2

Semifinals
1	(Argentina) J Riera	6	4	6
4	(Latvia) D Semeņistaja	2	6	4

=== Bottom half ===
First round
5	(Brazil) L Pigossi	6	6
WC	(Germany) J Middendorf	1	1
WC	(Germany) M Guth	4	6^{3}
(Czech Republic) T Martincová	6	7^{7}
(Germany) N Noha Akugue	3	1
Q	J Avdeeva	6	6
(Germany) E Seidel	1	3
3	(Germany) J Niemeier	6	6
6	(Romania) I-C Begu	6	6
(Czech Republic) D Šalková	0	4
(Switzerland) S Waltert	6	6
E Makarova	3	2
LL	(Ukraine) K Zavatska	5	7	6
(Croatia) T Würth	7	5	3
(Argentina) M Capurro Taborda	1	3
2	(Hungary) A Bondár	6	6

Second round
5	(Brazil) L Pigossi	3	5
(Czech Republic) T Martincová	6	7
Q	J Avdeeva	5	3
3	(Germany) J Niemeier	7	6
6	(Romania) I-C Begu	4	6	7^{7}
(Switzerland) S Waltert	6	1	6^{2}
LL	(Ukraine) K Zavatska	6^{3}	6	7
2	(Hungary) A Bondár	7^{7}	2	5

Quarterfinals
(Czech Republic) T Martincová	0	0^{r}
3	(Germany) J Niemeier	6	1
6	(Romania) I-C Begu	6	6
LL	(Ukraine) K Zavatska	2	2

Semifinals
3	(Germany) J Niemeier	6	6
6	(Romania) I-C Begu	1	3
