= 2019 Wiesbaden Tennis Open – Doubles =

Doubles
- 2019 Wiesbaden Tennis Open

Final
- Champions: (Russia) Anna Blinkova (Belgium) Yanina Wickmayer
- Runners-up: (Australia) Jaimee Fourlis (Liechtenstein) Kathinka von Deichmann
- Score: 6–3, 4–6, [10–3]

Events
Singles	Doubles
← 2018 ·	Wiesbaden Tennis Open	· 2021 →

Hélène Scholsen and Chanel Simmonds were the defending champions, but Simmonds chose not to participate. Scholsen partnered alongside İpek Soylu, but lost to Ágnes Bukta and Julia Terziyska in the first round.

Anna Blinkova and Yanina Wickmayer won the title, defeating Jaimee Fourlis and Kathinka von Deichmann in the final, 6–3, 4–6, [10–3].

== Seeds ==
1. (Russia) Anna Blinkova / (Belgium) Yanina Wickmayer (champions)
2. (Italy) Giorgia Marchetti / (Netherlands) Arantxa Rus (first round)
3. (Canada) Sharon Fichman / (Hungary) Réka Luca Jani (quarterfinals)
4. (Uzbekistan) Akgul Amanmuradova / (Georgia (country)) Sofia Shapatava (quarterfinals)

== Draw ==
Key

- Q = Qualifier
- WC = Wild card
- LL = Lucky loser
- Alt = Alternate
- ITF = ITF entry
- PR = Protected ranking
- SR = Special ranking
- SE = Special exempt
- JE = Junior exempt
- JR = Junior Accelerator Programme entrant
- CO = College Accelerator Programme entrant
- NG = Next Gen Accelerator Program entrant
- w/o = Walkover
- r = Retired
- d = Defaulted

=== Draw ===
First round
(Greece) V Grammatikopoulou (Netherlands) R van der Hoek	3	7	[3]
(Germany) K Gerlach (Germany) J Wachaczyk	6	5	[10]
4	(Uzbekistan) A Amanmuradova (Georgia (country)) S Shapatava	w/o
(France) V Muntean (France) D Parry
(Romania) E Bogdan (Venezuela) A Uzcátegui	2	6	[9]
(Argentina) N Podoroska (Germany) A Zaja	6	4	[11]
(Turkey) Ç Büyükakçay (Israel) J Glushko	2	1
(Australia) J Fourlis (Liechtenstein) K von Deichmann	6	6
(France) A Hesse (France) C Paquet	1	0
3	(Canada) S Fichman (Hungary) RL Jani	6	6
(Belgium) H Scholsen (Turkey) İ Soylu	4	1
(Hungary) Á Bukta (Bulgaria) J Terziyska	6	6

Quarterfinals
1	(Russia) A Blinkova (Belgium) Y Wickmayer	6	6
(Germany) K Gerlach (Germany) J Wachaczyk	2	4
4	(Uzbekistan) A Amanmuradova (Georgia (country)) S Shapatava	5	4
(Argentina) N Podoroska (Germany) A Zaja	7	6
(Australia) J Fourlis (Liechtenstein) K von Deichmann	6	7^{7}
3	(Canada) S Fichman (Hungary) RL Jani	4	6^{3}
(Hungary) Á Bukta (Bulgaria) J Terziyska	7	6
2	(Italy) G Marchetti (Netherlands) A Rus	5	3

Semifinals
1	(Russia) A Blinkova (Belgium) Y Wickmayer	7	4	[10]
(Argentina) N Podoroska (Germany) A Zaja	5	6	[7]
(Australia) J Fourlis (Liechtenstein) K von Deichmann	3	6	[10]
(Hungary) Á Bukta (Bulgaria) J Terziyska	6	3	[8]

Final
1	(Russia) A Blinkova (Belgium) Y Wickmayer	6	4	[10]
(Australia) J Fourlis (Liechtenstein) K von Deichmann	3	6	[3]
