= 2022 Wiesbaden Tennis Open – Singles =

Singles
- 2022 Wiesbaden Tennis Open

Final
- Champion: (Montenegro) Danka Kovinić
- Runner-up: (Germany) Nastasja Schunk
- Score: 6–3, 7–6^{(7–0)}

Events
Singles	Doubles
← 2021 ·	Wiesbaden Tennis Open	· 2023 →

Anna Bondár was the defending champion but chose not to participate.

Danka Kovinić won the title, defeating Nastasja Schunk in the final, 6–3, 7–6^{(7–0)}.

== Seeds ==
1. (Netherlands) Arantxa Rus (first round)
2. (Sweden) Rebecca Peterson (quarterfinals)
3. (Hungary) Panna Udvardy (first round)
4. (France) Clara Burel (first round)
5. (France) Kristina Mladenovic (first round)
6. (United Kingdom) Harriet Dart (first round)
7. (Croatia) Donna Vekić (first round)
8. (Germany) Jule Niemeier (semifinals)

== Draw ==
Key

- Q = Qualifier
- WC = Wild card
- LL = Lucky loser
- Alt = Alternate
- ITF = ITF entry
- PR = Protected ranking
- SR = Special ranking
- SE = Special exempt
- JE = Junior exempt
- JR = Junior Accelerator Programme entrant
- CO = College Accelerator Programme entrant
- NG = Next Gen Accelerator Program entrant
- w/o = Walkover
- r = Retired
- d = Defaulted

=== Finals ===
Semifinals
Q	(Lithuania) Justina Mikulskytė	3	4
(Montenegro) Danka Kovinić	6	6
(Germany) Nastasja Schunk	7	7
8	(Germany) Jule Niemeier	5	5

Final
(Montenegro) Danka Kovinić	6	7^{7}
(Germany) Nastasja Schunk	3	6^{0}

=== Top half ===
First round
1	(Netherlands) A Rus	5	6^{4}
(Netherlands) A Hartono	7	7^{7}
Q	(Austria) S Kraus	6	4
WC	(Germany) L Siegemund	3	1^{r}
Q	(Lithuania) J Mikulskytė	5	6	6
Q	(Romania) A Roșca	7	1	4
(Chile) D Seguel	2	6	6
5	(France) K Mladenovic	6	2	4
4	(France) C Burel	4	4
WC	(Germany) E Lys	6	6
(Bulgaria) V Tomova	6	6
Q	(Germany) Jo Steur	4	1
(Luxembourg) M Minella	6	6
Q	(Netherlands) E Vedder	4	2
(Montenegro) D Kovinić	7^{7}	6
7	(Croatia) D Vekić	6^{2}	1

Second round
(Netherlands) A Hartono	6^{7}	6	3
Q	(Austria) S Kraus	7^{9}	2	6
Q	(Lithuania) J Mikulskytė	6	6
(Chile) D Seguel	3	4
WC	(Germany) E Lys	7^{7}	6
(Bulgaria) V Tomova	6^{3}	4
(Luxembourg) M Minella	6	4	1
(Montenegro) D Kovinić	3	6	6

Quarterfinals
Q	(Austria) S Kraus	4	6	6^{4}
Q	(Lithuania) J Mikulskytė	6	1	7^{7}
WC	(Germany) E Lys	1	3
(Montenegro) D Kovinić	6	6

Semifinals
Q	(Lithuania) J Mikulskytė	3	4
(Montenegro) D Kovinić	6	6

=== Bottom half ===
First round
6	(United Kingdom) H Dart	5	6	3
WC	(Germany) J Middendorf	7	1	6
WC	(Germany) K Kanev	0	3
(Germany) N Schunk	6	6
(Switzerland) S Vögele	2	5
O Selekhmeteva	6	7
(United Kingdom) K Swan	6	2	6
3	(Hungary) P Udvardy	3	6	3
8	(Germany) J Niemeier	6	6
Q	E Makarova	2	2
(Slovenia) P Hercog	6	6
(Ukraine) K Baindl	1	3
Q	(Latvia) D Vismane	6	6
Q	(Slovenia) D Jakupović	2	2
(Germany) K Gerlach	2	4
2	(Sweden) R Peterson	6	6

Second round
WC	(Germany) J Middendorf	1	5
(Germany) N Schunk	6	7
O Selekhmeteva	6	0
(United Kingdom) K Swan	1	0^{r}
8	(Germany) J Niemeier	6	6
(Slovenia) P Hercog	2	2
Q	(Latvia) D Vismane	0	6^{3}
2	(Sweden) R Peterson	6	7^{7}

Quarterfinals
(Germany) N Schunk	7	6
O Selekhmeteva	5	4
8	(Germany) J Niemeier	6	6
2	(Sweden) R Peterson	4	2

Semifinals
(Germany) N Schunk	7	7
8	(Germany) J Niemeier	5	5
