= 2023 Montevideo Open – Doubles =

Doubles
- 2023 Montevideo Open

Final
- Champions: (Argentina) María Lourdes Carlé (Argentina) Julia Riera
- Runners-up: (United Kingdom) Freya Christie (Colombia) Yuliana Lizarazo
- Score: 7–6^{(7–5)}, 7–5

Events
Singles	Doubles
- Montevideo Open

María Lourdes Carlé and Julia Riera won the doubles title at the 2023 Montevideo Open, defeating Freya Christie and Yuliana Lizarazo in the final, 7–6^{(7–5)}, 7–5.

Ingrid Gamarra Martins and Luisa Stefani were the reigning champions, but chose not to participate this year.

== Seeds ==
1. Amina Anshba / (United States) Quinn Gleason (quarterfinals)
2. (Greece) Despina Papamichail / (Ukraine) Valeriya Strakhova (quarterfinals)
3. (Germany) Julia Lohoff / (Switzerland) Conny Perrin (semifinals)
4. (United Kingdom) Freya Christie / (Colombia) Yuliana Lizarazo (final)

== Draw ==
Key

- Q = Qualifier
- WC = Wild card
- LL = Lucky loser
- Alt = Alternate
- ITF = ITF entry
- PR = Protected ranking
- SR = Special ranking
- SE = Special exempt
- JE = Junior exempt
- JR = Junior Accelerator Programme entrant
- CO = College Accelerator Programme entrant
- NG = Next Gen Accelerator Program entrant
- w/o = Walkover
- r = Retired
- d = Defaulted

=== Draw ===
First round
1	A Anshba (United States) Q Gleason	6	3	[10]
(Colombia) MP Pérez García (United States) S Sewing	2	6	[6]
WC	(Uruguay) T Licht; D Lodikova	2	1
(Argentina) ML Carlé (Argentina) J Riera	6	6
3	(Germany) J Lohoff (Switzerland) C Perrin	7^{7}	6
(United States) J Loeb (United States) A Rogers	6^{3}	2
(Brazil) CM Alves (Argentina) S Sierra	4	3
(Venezuela) A Gámiz (Netherlands) E Vedder	6	6
(Georgia (country)) E Gorgodze (Greece) V Grammatikopoulou	6	6
(Brazil) G Cé (Brazil) R Pereira	0	1
(Peru) R Ccuno (United States) J Daniel	2	3
4	(United Kingdom) F Christie (Colombia) Y Lizarazo	6	6
(France) E Lechemia (Romania) G Lee	6	6
(Uruguay) L de Santa Ana (Uruguay) J Rodríguez	4	1
(Argentina) M Capurro Taborda (Switzerland) Y In-Albon	2	3
2	(Greece) D Papamichail (Ukraine) V Strakhova	6	6

Quarterfinals
1	A Anshba (United States) Q Gleason	3	2
(Argentina) ML Carlé (Argentina) J Riera	6	6
3	(Germany) J Lohoff (Switzerland) C Perrin	6	7^{7}
(Venezuela) A Gámiz (Netherlands) E Vedder	1	6^{4}
(Georgia (country)) E Gorgodze (Greece) V Grammatikopoulou	6	5	[8]
4	(United Kingdom) F Christie (Colombia) Y Lizarazo	4	7	[10]
(France) E Lechemia (Romania) G Lee	6	7^{7}
2	(Greece) D Papamichail (Ukraine) V Strakhova	3	6^{3}

Semifinals
(Argentina) ML Carlé (Argentina) J Riera	7	6
3	(Germany) J Lohoff (Switzerland) C Perrin	5	0
4	(United Kingdom) F Christie (Colombia) Y Lizarazo	4	6	[11]
(France) E Lechemia (Romania) G Lee	6	3	[9]

Final
(Argentina) ML Carlé (Argentina) J Riera	7^{7}	7
4	(United Kingdom) F Christie (Colombia) Y Lizarazo	6^{5}	5
