= 2023 Montevideo Open =

- Date: 4–10 December
- Edition: 3rd
- Category: WTA 125
- Prize money: $115,000
- Surface: Clay
- Location: Montevideo, Uruguay
- Venue: Carrasco Lawn Tennis Club

Champions

Singles
- (Mexico) Renata Zarazúa

Doubles
- (Argentina) María Lourdes Carlé / (Argentina) Julia Riera
- Montevideo Open

The 2023 Montevideo Open was a professional women's tennis tournament played on outdoor red clay courts at the Carrasco Lawn Tennis Club in Montevideo, Uruguay. It was the third edition of the tournament and part of the 2023 WTA 125 tournaments. It took place at the Carrasco Lawn Tennis Club in Montevideo, Uruguay between December 4 and 10, 2023.

== Singles entrants ==
=== Seeds ===
Country	Player	Rank^{1}	Seed
FRA	Diane Parry	94	1
MEX	Renata Zarazúa	135	2
ARG	Martina Capurro Taborda	153	3
ARG	Julia Riera	163	4
ARG	María Lourdes Carlé	175	5
ROU	Miriam Bulgaru	201	6
ARG	Solana Sierra	209	7
GRE	Valentini Grammatikopoulou	217	8

- Rankings are as of November 27, 2023.

=== Other entrants ===
The following players received wildcards into the singles main draw:

- (Brazil) Carolina Bohrer Martins
- (Uruguay) Lucía de Santa Ana
- (United States) Taly Licht
- (Uruguay) Juliana Rodríguez

The following player received entry into the main draw through a protected ranking:

- (Slovenia) Polona Hercog

The following players received entry from the qualifying draw:

- (United States) Haley Giavarra
- (Romania) Gabriela Lee
- (United States) Varvara Lepchenko
- (United States) Anna Rogers

=== Withdrawals ===
Before the tournament

- (Romania) Irina-Camelia Begu → replaced by (Greece) Despina Papamichail
- (Poland) Maja Chwalińska → replaced by (Ukraine) Valeriya Strakhova
- (France) Léolia Jeanjean → replaced by (Turkey) İpek Öz
- (United States) Elizabeth Mandlik → replaced by (Spain) Leyre Romero Gormaz
- (Croatia) Petra Marčinko → replaced by (Netherlands) Eva Vedder
- (France) Carole Monnet → replaced by (Georgia (country)) Ekaterine Gorgodze
- (Germany) Jule Niemeier → replaced by (United States) Raveena Kingsley
- (Brazil) Laura Pigossi → replaced by Daria Lodikova
- Iryna Shymanovich → replaced by (United States) Victoria Hu
- (Hungary) Panna Udvardy → replaced by (United States) Jamie Loeb

== Doubles entrants ==
=== Seeds ===
Country	Player	Country	Player	Rank^{1}	Seed
	Amina Anshba	USA	Quinn Gleason	199	1
GRE	Despina Papamichail	UKR	Valeriya Strakhova	215	2
GER	Julia Lohoff	SUI	Conny Perrin	230	3
GBR	Freya Christie	COL	Yuliana Lizarazo	258	4

- ^{1} Rankings as of 27 November 2023.

=== Other entrants ===
The following pair received a wildcard into the doubles main draw:

- (United States) Taly Licht / Daria Lodikova

== Champions ==
=== Singles ===
- (Mexico) Renata Zarazúa def. (France) Diane Parry, 7–5, 3–6, 6–4

=== Doubles ===
- (Argentina) María Lourdes Carlé / (Argentina) Julia Riera def. (United Kingdom) Freya Christie / (Colombia) Yuliana Lizarazo 7–6^{(7–5)}, 7–5
