= 2026 Wiesbaden Tennis Open =

Tennis tournament

- Date: 27 April–3 May 2026
- Edition: 17th
- Category: ITF Women's World Tennis Tour
- Prize money: $100,000
- Surface: Clay / Outdoor
- Location: Wiesbaden, Germany

2025 Champions

Singles
- (Hungary) Anna Bondár

Doubles
- (Kazakhstan) Zhibek Kulambayeva / (Latvia) Darja Semeņistaja
- Wiesbaden Tennis Open

The 2026 Wiesbaden Tennis Open was a professional tennis tournament played on outdoor clay courts. It was the seventeenth edition of the tournament, which was part of the 2026 ITF Women's World Tennis Tour. It took place in Wiesbaden, Germany, between 27 April and 3 May 2026.

== Champions ==
=== Singles ===
- (Germany) Noma Noha Akugue def. (Slovakia) Mia Pohánková 6–2, 7–6^{(7–3)}

=== Doubles ===
- (Croatia) Lucija Ćirić Bagarić / (Slovenia) Nika Radišić def. (Czech Republic) Lucie Havlíčková / (Czech Republic) Anna Sisková 5–7, 7–6^{(7–3)}, [10–5]

== Singles main draw entrants ==
=== Seeds ===
Country	Player	Rank	Seed
BEL	Hanne Vandewinkel	92	1
SUI	Simona Waltert	97	2
GER	Ella Seidel	100	3
GBR	Francesca Jones	102	4
AUT	Sinja Kraus	104	5
AUT	Julia Grabher	107	6
LAT	Darja Semeņistaja	112	7
UZB	Maria Timofeeva	154	8

- Rankings are as of 20 April 2026.

=== Other entrants ===
The following players received wildcards into the singles main draw:

- (Germany) Eva Bennemann
- (Germany) Tessa Brockmann
- (Germany) Anna-Lena Friedsam
- (Germany) Jule Niemeier

The following players received entry from the qualifying draw:

- Erika Andreeva
- (Armenia) Elina Avanesyan
- (Croatia) Lucija Ćirić Bagarić
- (Germany) Mina Hodzic
- (Germany) Emily Seibold
- (Ukraine) Polina Skliar
- (Belgium) Jeline Vandromme
- (Bulgaria) Elizara Yaneva

The following player received entry as a lucky loser:

- (Sweden) Caijsa Hennemann
