= Freya Christie =

British tennis player (born 1997)

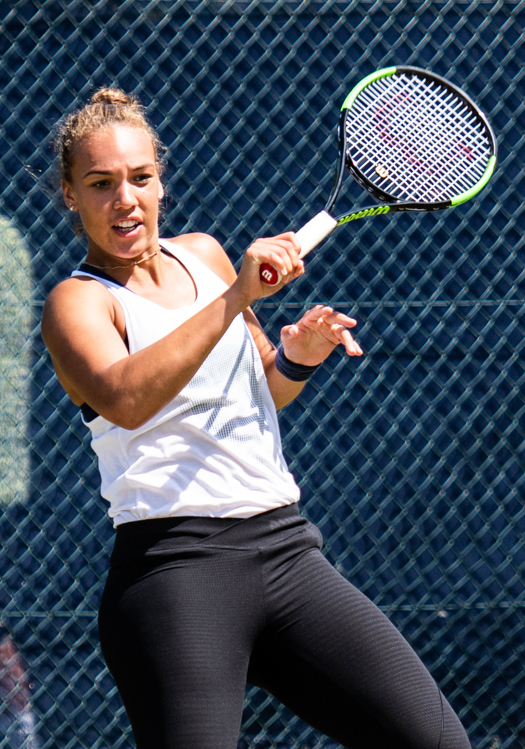
- 2018 Nottingham Open
- Full name: Freya Nicole Christie
- Country (sports): United Kingdom
- Residence: Nottingham, England
- Born: 8 November 1997 (age 29) Hucknall, Nottinghamshire, England
- Height: 180 cm (5 ft 11 in)
- Plays: Right (two-handed backhand)
- Coach: Mark Taylor
- Prize money: $266,640

Singles
- Career record: 243–248
- Career titles: 0
- Highest ranking: No. 286 (31 October 2016)

Grand Slam singles results
- Wimbledon: Q1 (2014, 2016, 2017)

Doubles
- Career record: 301–215
- Career titles: 1 WTA 125
- Highest ranking: No. 110 (26 June 2023)
- Current ranking: No. 147 (16 November 2026)

Grand Slam doubles results
- Wimbledon: 1R (2023, 2024, 2026)

Grand Slam mixed doubles results
- Wimbledon: 1R (2024, 2026)
- Last updated on: 21 November 2026.

Freya Nicole Christie (born 8 November 1997) is a British tennis player who specializes in doubles. She has won one WTA 125 doubles title and 29 doubles titles on the ITF Women's Circuit.

== Career ==
On 6 June 2016, Christie made her WTA Tour debut at the Nottingham Open, losing in the first round to Zheng Saisai, 4–6, 2–6.

Partnering Yuliana Lizarazo, she was runner-up in the doubles at the 2023 Ljubljana Open and at the 2023 Montevideo Open.

Teaming up with Eden Silva she won her first WTA 125 doubles title at the 2026 Ilkley Open, defeating Madeleine Brooks and Amelia Rajecki in the final.

== Grand Slam performance timeline ==
Key
W	F	SF	QF	#R	RR	Q#	DNQ	A	NH

(W) winner; (F) finalist; (SF) semifinalist; (QF) quarterfinalist; (#R) rounds 4, 3, 2, 1; (RR) round-robin stage; (Q#) qualification round; (DNQ) did not qualify; (A) absent; (NH) not held; (SR) strike rate (events won / competed); (W–L) win–loss record.
To avoid confusion and double counting, these charts are updated at the conclusion of a tournament or when the player's participation has ended.

== WTA 125 finals ==
=== Doubles: 3 (1 title, 2 runner-ups) ===
Result	W–L	Date	Tournament	Surface	Partner	Opponents	Score
Loss	0–1	Sep 2023	Ljubljana Open, Slovenia	Clay	(Colombia) Yuliana Lizarazo	Amina Anshba (United States) Quinn Gleason	3–6, 4–6
Loss	0–2	Dec 2023	Montevideo Open, Uruguay	Clay	(Colombia) Yuliana Lizarazo	(Argentina) María Lourdes Carlé (Argentina) Julia Riera	6–7^{(5–7)}, 5–7
Win	1–2	Jun 2026	Ilkley Trophy, United Kingdom	Grass	(United Kingdom) Eden Silva	(United Kingdom) Madeleine Brooks (United Kingdom) Amelia Rajecki	1–6, 6–4, [10–7]

== ITF Circuit finals ==
=== Singles: 5 (5 runner-ups) ===
Legend 25k tournaments (0–2) 10/15k tournaments (0–3)	Finals by surface Hard (0–5)

Result	W–L	Date	Tournament	Tier	Surface	Opponent	Score
Loss	0–1	Sep 2015	ITF Sharm El Sheikh, Egypt	10k	Hard	(Slovakia) Viktória Kužmová	6–7^{(4)}, 5–7
Loss	0–2	Oct 2015	ITF Sharm El Sheikh, Egypt	10k	Hard	(Sweden) Jacqueline Cabaj Awad	6–2, 6–7^{(5)}, 4–6
Loss	0–3	Nov 2015	GB Pro-Series Shrewsbury, UK	25k	Hard (i)	(France) Océane Dodin	6–7^{(3)}, 5–7
Loss	0–4	Sep 2016	ITF Lubbock, United States	25k	Hard	(Slovakia) Viktória Kužmová	0–6, 5–7
Loss	0–5	Nov 2017	ITF Sunderland, UK	15k	Hard (i)	(United Kingdom) Maia Lumsden	4–6, 0–6

=== Doubles: 50 (29 titles, 21 runner-ups) ===
Legend W100 tournaments (1–1) W80 tournaments (1–0) W60/75 tournaments (7–8) W40/50 tournaments (1–2) W25/35 tournaments (13–6) W10/15 tournaments (6–4)	Finals by surface Hard (27–16) Clay (2–3) Carpet (0–2)

Result	W–L	Date	Tournament	Tier	Surface	Partner	Opponents	Score
Loss	0–1	Aug 2014	ITF Nottingham, UK	10k	Hard	(United Kingdom) Katie Boulter	(Australia) Alison Bai (Japan) Mari Tanaka	4–6, 3–6
Loss	0–2	Aug 2015	ITF Chiswick, UK	10k	Hard	(United Kingdom) Emily Arbuthnott	(United Kingdom) Harriet Dart (United Kingdom) Katy Dunne	2–6, 2–6
Loss	0–3	Sep 2015	ITF Sharm El Sheikh, Egypt	10k	Hard	(Romania) Jaqueline Cristian	(China) Lu Jiaxi (Sweden) Brenda Njuki	6–4, 6–7^{(4)}, [10–5]
Win	1–3	Oct 2015	ITF Sharm El Sheikh, Egypt	10k	Hard	(United States) Alexandra Riley	(Egypt) Ola Abou Zekry (Montenegro) Ana Veselinović	7–6^{(9)}, 3–6, [10–8]
Win	2–3	Oct 2015	ITF Sharm El Sheikh, Egypt	10k	Hard	(Romania) Karola Bejenaru	(Republic of Ireland) Jennifer Claffey (Russia) Anna Morgina	6–3, 6–2
Win	3–3	Nov 2015	GB Pro-Series Loughborough, UK	15k	Hard (i)	(United Kingdom) Lisa Whybourn	(Samoa) Steffi Carruthers (Mexico) Sabastiani León	6–1, 6–2
Loss	3–4	Nov 2015	GB Pro-Series Bath, UK	25k	Hard (i)	(United Kingdom) Lisa Whybourn	(United Kingdom) Sarah Beth Askew (United Kingdom) Olivia Nicholls	6–1, 4–6, [2–10]
Win	4–4	Apr 2016	ITF Heraklion, Greece	10k	Hard	(South Africa) Chanel Simmonds	(Russia) Valeria Savinykh (Ukraine) Alyona Sotnikova	6–4, 6–0
Win	5–4	May 2016	ITF Goyang, South Korea	25k	Hard	(United Kingdom) Harriet Dart	(Russia) Anastasia Gasanova (Australia) Maddison Inglis	6–3, 6–2
Win	6–4	Aug 2016	ITF Landisville, US	25k	Hard	(United Kingdom) Laura Robson	(Belgium) Elise Mertens (Belgium) An-Sophie Mestach	6–3, 6–4
Loss	6–5	Apr 2017	ITF Istanbul, Turkey	25k	Hard	(United Kingdom) Laura Robson	(Russia) Olga Doroshina (Russia) Polina Monova	3–6, 2–6
Win	7–5	Nov 2017	GB Pro-Series Shrewsbury, UK	25k	Hard (i)	(United Kingdom) Harriet Dart	(United Kingdom) Maia Lumsden (United Kingdom) Katie Swan	3–6, 6–4, [10–6]
Win	8–5	Nov 2017	ITF Sharm El Sheikh, Egypt	15k	Hard	(United Kingdom) Jodie Burrage	(Sweden) Linnéa Malmqvist (South Korea) Park Sang-hee	7–5, 3–6, [13–11]
Win	9–5	Nov 2017	ITF Sharm El Sheikh, Egypt	15k	Hard	(United Kingdom) Jodie Burrage	(Thailand) Watsachol Sawasdee (Thailand) Chanikarn Silakul	6–4, 7–5
Loss	9–6	Mar 2018	ITF Gwalior, India	25k	Hard	(Uzbekistan) Albina Khabibulina	(Russia) Yana Sizikova (Montenegro) Ana Veselinović	3–6, 6–2, [5–10]
Loss	9–7	Apr 2018	ITF Óbidos, Portugal	25k	Carpet	(Belgium) An-Sophie Mestach	(Spain) Estrella Cabeza Candela (Spain) Ángela Fita Boluda	6–7^{(3)}, 6–1, [6–10]
Win	10–7	Aug 2018	ITF Chiswick, UK	25k	Hard	(United Kingdom) Samantha Murray	(United Kingdom) Sarah Beth Grey (United Kingdom) Olivia Nicholls	6–3, 5–7, [8–10]
Win	11–7	Oct 2018 (Note: Rain stopped play on 12 October with the score at 1–3 in the first set, and also prevented play the following day; the match was completed on 14 October.)	ITF Toowoomba, Australia	25k	Hard	(New Zealand) Erin Routliffe	(Australia) Samantha Harris (Australia) Astra Sharma	7–5, 6–4
Win	12–7	Nov 2018	ITF Wirral, UK	25k	Hard	(Russia) Valeria Savinykh	(United Kingdom) Sarah Beth Grey (United Kingdom) Olivia Nicholls	6–4, 7–5
Loss	12–8	Feb 2019	GB Pro-Series Shrewsbury, UK	W60	Hard (i)	(Russia) Valeria Savinykh	(Australia) Arina Rodionova (Belgium) Yanina Wickmayer	2–6, 5–7
Loss	12–9	Feb 2019	GB Pro-Series Glasgow, UK	W25	Hard (i)	(Croatia) Jana Fett	(Netherlands) Lesley Kerkhove (Germany) Anna Zaja	4–6, 6–3, [3–10]
Loss	12–10	Mar 2019	ITF Kazan, Russia	W25	Hard (i)	(Russia) Valeria Savinykh	(Russia) Olga Doroshina (Russia) Polina Monova	4–6, 7–6^{(4)}, [9–11]
Win	13–10	May 2019	ITF Khimki, Russia	W25	Hard (i)	(Russia) Ekaterina Yashina	(Russia) Anastasia Frolova (Russia) Sofya Lansere	6–3, 6–3
Loss	13–11	Oct 2020	ITF Sharm El-Sheikh, Egypt	W15	Hard	(United Kingdom) Emily Arbuthnott	(Ukraine) Viktoriia Dema (Poland) Martyna Kubka	4–6, 3–6
Win	14–11	Aug 2022	GB Pro-Series Foxhills, UK	W25	Hard (i)	(United Kingdom) Ali Collins	(United Kingdom) Naiktha Bains (United Kingdom) Maia Lumsden	6–3, 6–3
Win	15–11	Aug 2022	ITF Aldershot, UK	W25	Hard	(United Kingdom) Ali Collins	(Lithuania) Andrė Lukošiūtė (United Kingdom) Eliz Maloney	6–4, 6–2
Win	16–11	Sep 2022	ITF Le Neubourg, France	W80+H	Hard	(United Kingdom) Ali Collins	(Poland) Weronika Falkowska (United Kingdom) Sarah Beth Grey	1–6, 7–6^{(4)}, [10–3]
Win	17–11	Oct 2022	GB Pro-Series Glasgow, UK	W60	Hard (i)	(United Kingdom) Ali Collins	(Spain) Irene Burillo (Spain) Andrea Lázaro García	6–4, 6–1
Loss	17–12	Jan 2023	ITF Tallinn, Estonia	W40	Hard (i)	(United Kingdom) Ali Collins	(Czech Republic) Anna Sisková (United States) Jessie Aney	4–6, 7–6^{(3)}, [7–10]
Win	18–12	Jan 2023	ITF Sunderland, UK	W60	Hard (i)	(United Kingdom) Ali Collins	(Belgium) Magali Kempen (United Kingdom) Eden Silva	6–3, 7–6^{(5)}
Win	19–12	Feb 2023	Open de l'Isère, France	W60	Hard (i)	(United Kingdom) Ali Collins	Sofya Lansere; Maria Timofeeva	6–4, 6–3
Loss	19–13	Mar 2023	AK Ladies Open, Germany	W60	Carpet (i)	(United Kingdom) Ali Collins	(Belgium) Greet Minnen (Belgium) Yanina Wickmayer	4–6, 4–6
Loss	19–14	Apr 2023	Bellinzona Ladies Open, Switzerland	W60	Clay	(United Kingdom) Ali Collins	(Switzerland) Conny Perrin (Czech Republic) Anna Sisková	6–3, 6–7^{(9)}, [5–10]
Loss	19–15	Oct 2023	GB Pro-Series Glasgow, UK	W60	Hard (i)	(Australia) Olivia Gadecki	(Portugal) Francisca Jorge (United Kingdom) Maia Lumsden	3–6, 1–6
Win	20–15	Oct 2023	ITF Sunderland, UK	W25	Hard (i)	(Estonia) Elena Malõgina	(Georgia (country)) Mariam Bolkvadze (United Kingdom) Samantha Murray Sharan	6–0, 4–6, [10–4]
Loss	20–16	Jan 2024	Open Andrézieux-Bouthéon, France	W75	Hard (i)	(United Kingdom) Emily Appleton	Alevtina Ibragimova; Ekaterina Ovcharenko	6–3, 3–6, [5–10]
Win	21–16	Feb 2024	Open de l'Isère, France	W75	Hard (i)	(United Kingdom) Emily Appleton	(United Kingdom) Sarah Beth Grey (United Kingdom) Eden Silva	3–6, 6–1, [11–9]
Win	22–16	Feb 2024	ITF Roehampton, UK	W50	Hard (i)	(United Kingdom) Samantha Murray Sharan	(United Kingdom) Ali Collins (Estonia) Elena Malõgina	7–6^{(5)}, 6–3
Loss	22–17	Aug 2024	ITF Oldenzaal, Netherlands	W50	Clay	(Colombia) Yuliana Lizarazo	Polina Kudermetova; Ekaterina Makarova	4–6, 6–1, [7–10]
Win	23–17	Oct 2024	GB Pro-Series Glasgow, UK	W75	Hard (i)	(United Kingdom) Jodie Burrage	(Georgia (country)) Mariam Bolkvadze (Netherlands) Isabelle Haverlag	6–4, 3–6, [10–5]
Loss	23–18	May 2025	ITF Kuršumlijska Banja, Serbia	W75	Clay	(Kazakhstan) Zhibek Kulambayeva	(Turkey) Ayla Aksu (Czech Republic) Anna Sisková	4–6, 2–6
Loss	23–19	Oct 2025	ITF Les Franqueses del Vallès, Spain	W100	Hard	(Switzerland) Susan Bandecchi	(Slovenia) Dalila Jakupović (Slovenia) Nika Radišić	4–6, 6–2, [6–10]
Loss	23–20	Oct 2025	GB Pro-Series Glasgow, UK	W75	Hard (i)	(United Kingdom) Lily Miyazaki	(Switzerland) Céline Naef (United States) Clervie Ngounoue	0–6, 4–6
Win	24–20	Apr 2026	ITF Roehampton, UK	W50	Hard	(United Kingdom) Eden Silva	(United Kingdom) Emily Appleton (Slovakia) Viktória Hrunčáková	7–6^{(7)}, 3–6, [10–6]
Win	25–20	Apr 2026	ITF Nottingham, UK	W35	Hard	(United Kingdom) Eden Silva	(Czech Republic) Aneta Laboutková (Slovenia) Kristina Novak	6–1, 6–0
Win	26–20	May 2026	ITF Nottingham, UK	W35	Hard	(Slovenia) Kristina Novak	(United Kingdom) Victoria Allen (United Kingdom) Amelia Rajecki	6–4, 6–2
Win	27–20	Jun 2026	Internazionali di Caserta, Italy	W75	Clay	(United Kingdom) Eden Silva	(Spain) Yvonne Cavallé Reimers (Brazil) Laura Pigossi	3–6, 6–4, [10–4]
Loss	27–21	Aug 2026	ITF Ourense, Spain	W75	Hard	(United Kingdom) Alicia Dudeney	(Portugal) Francisca Jorge (Portugal) Matilde Jorge	walkover
Win	28–21	Aug 2026	ITF Aldershot, UK	W35	Hard	(United Kingdom) Jodie Burrage	(United Kingdom) Daniella Britton (United Kingdom) Savannah Dada-Masco	6–7^{(4)}, 6–3, [11–9]
Win	29–21	Oct 2026	ITF Wrexham, UK	W100	Hard (i)	(United Kingdom) Eden Silva	(Japan) Hiroko Kuwata (India) Ankita Raina	6–2, 6–3
