= Julia Riera =

Argentine tennis player (born 2002)

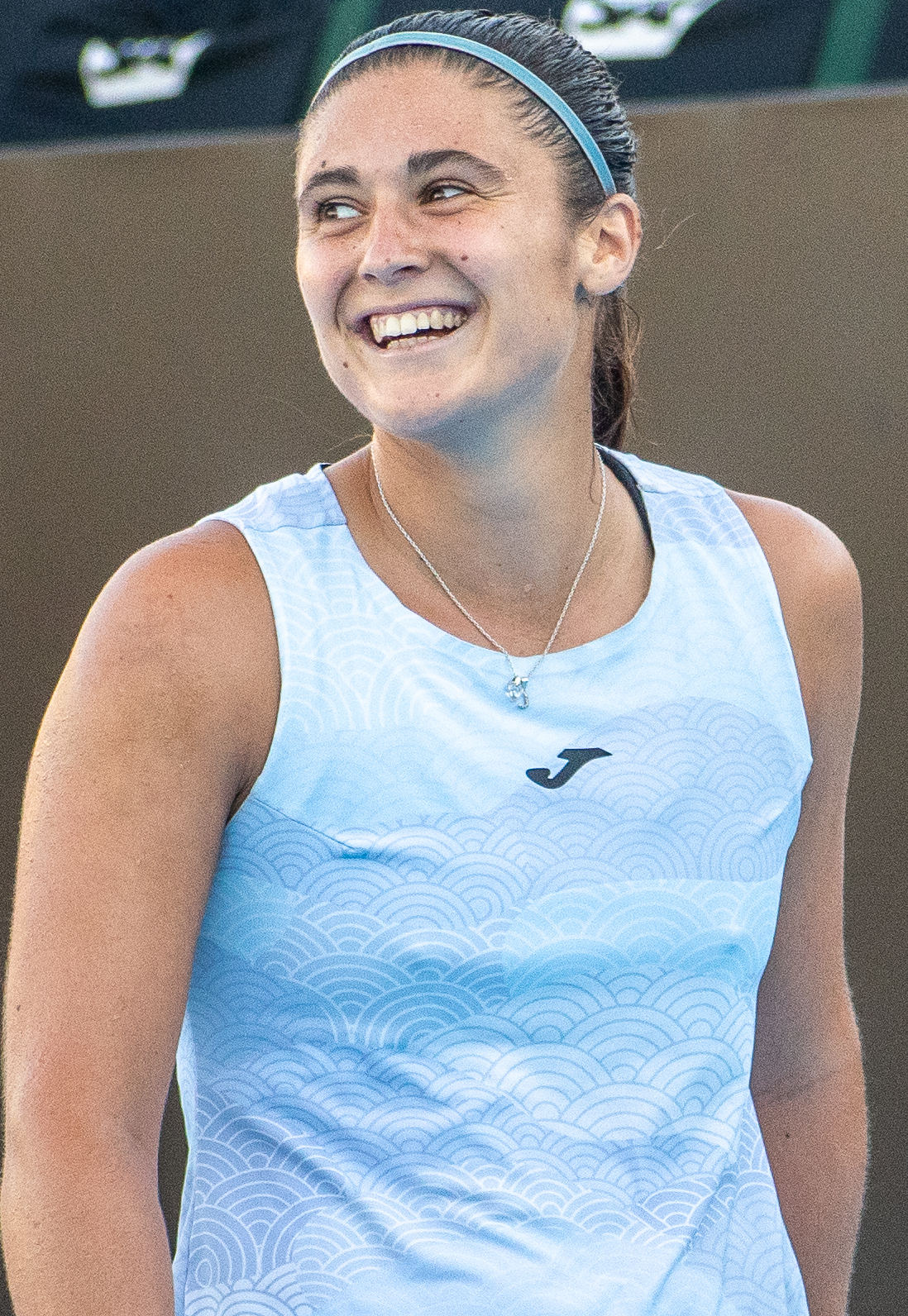
- Riera in 2025
- Country (sports): Argentina
- Born: 29 May 2002 (age 24) Pergamino, Argentina
- Height: 1.70 m (5 ft 7 in)
- Plays: Right (two-handed backhand)
- Prize money: $988,912

Singles
- Career record: 254–156
- Career titles: 8 ITF
- Highest ranking: No. 93 (20 May 2024)
- Current ranking: No. 153 (3 August 2026)

Grand Slam singles results
- Australian Open: 1R (2025)
- French Open: 1R (2024, 2025)
- Wimbledon: 1R (2024)
- US Open: Q2 (2023, 2024)

Doubles
- Career record: 94–93
- Career titles: 1 WTA Challenger
- Highest ranking: No. 176 (5 August 2024)
- Current ranking: No. 270 (3 August 2026)

Team competitions
- BJK Cup: 25–8
Medal record
Women's tennis
Representing Argentina
Pan American Games
Bronze medal – third place	2023 Santiago	Singles
Bronze medal – third place	2023 Santiago	Doubles
- Last updated on: 6 August 2026.

Julia Riera (born 29 May 2002) is an Argentine tennis player. Riera has a career-high singles ranking by the WTA of No. 93, achieved on 20 May 2024. She also has a career-high doubles ranking of world No. 176, which she reached on 5 August 2024.

She has won one doubles title on the WTA Challenger Tour as well as eight singles and three doubles titles on the ITF Circuit.

Riera competes for Argentina in the Billie Jean King Cup, where she has a win/loss record of 25–8.

== Career ==
=== Early years ===
She began playing tennis at the age of seven at Gimnasia y Esgrima de Pergamino. At the age of nine, she moved to Viajantes de Pergamino, where she started being coached by Emilio Palena.

In 2016, she began traveling regularly to the CeNARD, and finished the year competing in the under-14 category at the Orange Bowl.

In 2017 and 2018, she represented Vélez Sarsfield in the interclub competitions organized by the Asociación Argentina de Tenis (Argentine Tennis Association).

In 2019, she began representing River Plate in the interclub championships and, with a 5–1 record, reached the final.

=== 2021 ===
She won her first two professional titles in Antalya, Turkey, capturing two W15 titles in consecutive weeks.

=== 2022 ===
In April 2022, Riera participated in the Billie Jean King Cup in Salinas, Ecuador, teaming up with Jazmin Ortenzi to be defeated by Brazilian players Carolina Alves and Beatriz Haddad Maia in a match lasting over three hours.

=== 2023: WTA Tour debut, first semifinal ===
Riera made her WTA Tour debut at the Morocco Open in Rabat. In her first match, she defeated former top-ten player Kristina Mladenovic. In the following round, she defeated third seed Mayar Sherif to reach her first WTA Tour quarterfinal. She then defeated sixth seed Yulia Putintseva, reaching a WTA Tour-level semifinal on her tour debut. However, she lost to Julia Grabher in three sets.

In August, Riera competed in an ITF W80 tournament event in Brasília. In doubles, she partnered with Brazilian player Carolina Alves and won the title, defeating the British-Ukrainian duo Eden Silva and Valeriya Strakhova in the final.

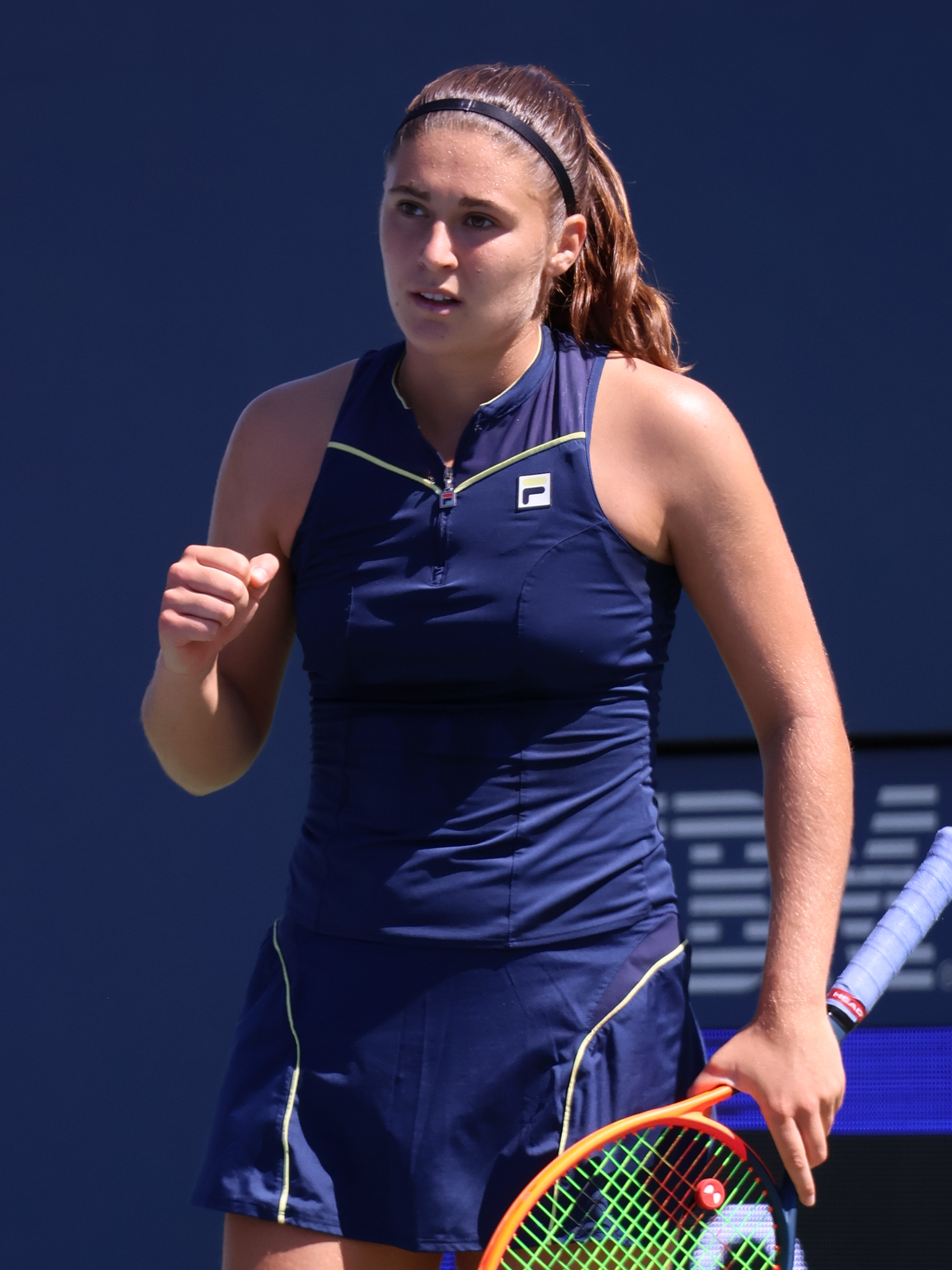
Riera at the 2023 US Open

During the 2023 Pan American Games in Santiago, Riera won the bronze medal in women's doubles, partnering with María Lourdes Carlé.

Riera also won the singles bronze medal, defeating Rebecca Marino from Canada in the bronze-medal match by 3–6, 6–4, 6–1.

Partnering again with María Carlé, she won the doubles title at the Montevideo Open, defeating Freya Christie and Yuliana Lizarazo in the final.

=== 2024: First WTA 500 win, top 100 & major debuts ===
In January, Riera qualified for the 2024 Brisbane International, after defeating both Priscilla Hon and Mai Hontama in three sets, respectively. In the first round, she defeated Viktoriya Tomova in straight sets, notching both her first WTA 500 main-draw win as well as her first WTA Tour-level victory on hardcourts. In the following round, Riera defeated seventh seed and world No. 21, Ekaterina Alexandrova, to book a spot in the round of 16. She lost to Linda Nosková, after pushing her to three sets.

Following her lifting the biggest singles trophy of her career at the W75 in Chiasso, she reached the top 100 in the rankings at No. 94, on 22 April 2024.

After that, Riera played at the Wiesbaden Open and won the singles title, defeating Jule Niemeier in the final, in three sets.

In May, she qualified into the 2024 French Open for her major main-draw debut, after facing Alexandra Eala in the last match of the qualifying rounds and winning in three sets.

At the main draw's first round, Riera was overcome by Romanian Irina-Camelia Begu.

In November, with the Argentine Billie Jean King Cup team, she went to São Paulo to face the Brazilian team. Partnering with Jazmín Ortenzi, she lost to Carolina Alves and Beatriz Haddad Maia in the decisive doubles match of the tie, in which Brazil secured a place in the 2025 Finals qualifiers.

=== 2025: Australian Open debut ===
In January, Riera qualified for the main draw of the singles competition of the Australian Open for the first time in her career and lost to Haddad Maia in a three-set match in the first round.

At the 2025 Copa Colsanitas, in Bogota, Colombia, Riera was a semifinalist, losing in straight sets to Camila Osorio.

In her first round match, Riera was leading British player Francesca Jones 5–3 in the third set when the match ended dramatically, after Jones collapsed due to the effects of playing at high altitude without acclimatisation. Riera assisted medics as her opponent was lifted into a wheelchair and taken off the court.

At the French Open, Riera, along with Lourdes Carlé and Paula Ormaechea successfully advanced from the qualifying rounds into the main draw of the women's singles. This marked the first time in 39 years that three Argentine women achieved this feat in the same edition of the tournament, matching the milestone last reached in 1986.

In September, Riera played at the first edition of the SP Open, a WTA 250 held in São Paulo, Brazil. She advanced to the second round of the singles draw, but was defeated in straight sets by Alexandra Eala.

In December, Riera took part in the first edition of the exhibition tournament “Road to Australia” in Buenos Aires. She was crowned women's champion after defeating Jazmín Ortenzi in the final, 6–4 6–3.

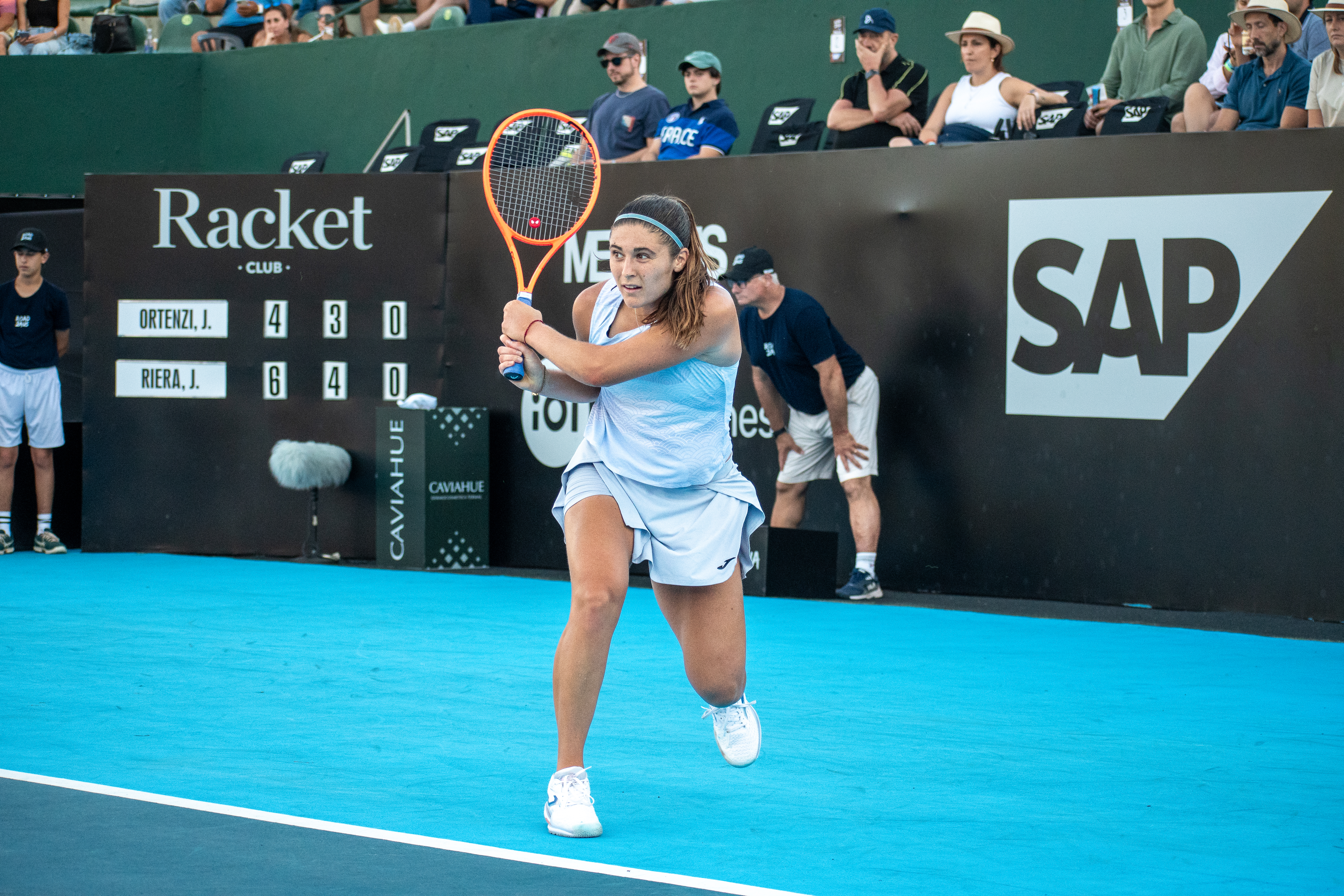
Riera in 2025 at the Road to Australia final

== Performance timelines ==
Key
W	F	SF	QF	#R	RR	Q#	P#	DNQ	A	Z#	PO	G	S	B	NMS	NTI	P	NH

(W) winner; (F) finalist; (SF) semifinalist; (QF) quarterfinalist; (#R) rounds 4, 3, 2, 1; (RR) round-robin stage; (Q#) qualification round; (P#) preliminary round; (DNQ) did not qualify; (A) absent; (Z#) Davis/Fed Cup Zonal Group (with number indication) or (PO) play-off; (G) gold, (S) silver or (B) bronze Olympic/Paralympic medal; (NMS) not a Masters tournament; (NTI) not a Tier I tournament; (P) postponed; (NH) not held; (SR) strike rate (events won / competed); (W–L) win–loss record.
To avoid confusion and double counting, these charts are updated at the conclusion of a tournament or when the player's participation has ended.

Only main-draw results in WTA Tour, Grand Slam tournaments, Billie Jean King Cup, United Cup, Hopman Cup and Olympic Games are included in win–loss records.

=== Singles ===
Current through the 2023 US Open.

Tournament	2022	2023	2024	2025	2026	SR	W–L
Grand Slam tournaments
Australian Open	A	A	Q3	1R	Q2	0 / 1	0–1
French Open	A	A	1R	1R	Q3	0 / 2	0–2
Wimbledon	A	Q2	1R	Q2	Q2	0 / 1	0–1
US Open	A	Q2	Q2	Q1	Q1	0 / 0	0–0
Win–loss	0–0	0–0	0–2	0–2	0–0	0 / 4	0–4
National representation
Billie Jean King Cup (Note: Formerly known as Fed Cup until 2020.)	PO	PO				0 / 0	5–0
Career statistics
Tournaments	0	2				Career total: 2	
Overall win–loss	0–0	9–2				0 / 2	9–2
Year-end ranking (Note: 2019: WTA ranking–1108, 2020: WTA ranking–1201, 2021: WTA ranking–654.)	260	158	114	170		$151,546	

== WTA 125 finals ==
=== Doubles: 2 (1 title, 1 runner-up) ===
Result	W–L	Date	Tournament	Surface	Partner	Opponents	Score
Win	1–0	Dec 2023	Montevideo Open, Uruguay	Clay	(Argentina) María Lourdes Carlé	(United Kingdom) Freya Christie (Colombia) Yuliana Lizarazo	7–6^{(5)}, 7–5
Loss	1–1	Jul 2024	Båstad Open, Sweden	Clay	(Argentina) María Lourdes Carlé	(Thailand) Peangtarn Plipuech (Chinese Taipei) Tsao Chia-yi	5–7, 3–6

== ITF Circuit finals ==
=== Singles: 12 (8 titles, 4 runner-ups) ===
Legend W100 tournaments (1–1) W60/75 tournaments (2–0) W25/35 tournaments (3–3) W15 tournaments (2–0)	Finals by surface Clay (8–4)

Result	W–L	Date	Tournament	Tier	Surface	Opponent	Score
Win	1–0	Oct 2021	ITF Antalya, Turkey	W15	Clay	(Spain) Rosa Vicens Mas	6–4, 5–7, 7–6^{(1)}
Win	2–0	Nov 2021	ITF Antalya, Turkey	W15	Clay	(China) Tian Fangran	7–6^{(3)}, 6–1
Loss	2–1	Aug 2022	ITF Koksijde, Belgium	W25	Clay	(Belgium) Marie Benoît	5–7, 3–6
Win	3–1	Sep 2022	ITF Trieste, Italy	W25	Clay	(Romania) Oana Georgeta Simion	6–1, 6–4
Loss	3–2	Jan 2023	ITF Buenos Aires, Argentina	W25	Clay	(Italy) Nuria Brancaccio	4–6, 6–4, 5–7
Win	4–2	Apr 2023	ITF Guayaquil, Ecuador	W25	Clay	(United Kingdom) Francesca Jones	6–2, 7–5
Win	5–2	Apr 2023	ITF Guayaquil, Ecuador	W25	Clay	(Argentina) Solana Sierra	6–4, 4–6, 6–4
Win	6–2	Apr 2024	Chiasso Open, Switzerland	W75	Clay	(Hungary) Anna Bondár	6–3, 7–6^{(2)}
Win	7–2	May 2024	Wiesbaden Open, Germany	W100	Clay	(Germany) Jule Niemeier	3–6, 6–3, 6–2
Loss	7–3	May 2026	ITF Boca Raton, United States	W35	Clay	(United States) Amelia Honer	5–7, 7–5, 5–7
Loss	7–4	May 2026	ITF Indian Harbour Beach, US	W100	Clay	Kristina Liutova	1–6, 7–6^{(4)}, 3–6
Win	8–4	Jul 2026	Vacaria Open, Brazil	W75	Clay	(Peru) Lucciana Pérez Alarcón	7–5, 6–0

=== Doubles: 8 (5 titles, 3 runner-ups) ===
Legend W80 tournaments (1–0) W60/75 tournaments (0–1) W40/50 tournaments (2–0) W25/35 tournaments (2–2)	Finals by surface Hard (1–0) Clay (4–3)

Result	W–L	Date	Tournament	Tier	Surface	Partner	Opponents	Score
Loss	0–1	Sep 2022	ITF Marbella, Spain	W25	Clay	(Chile) Daniela Seguel	(Spain) Jéssica Bouzas Maneiro (Spain) Leyre Romero Gormaz	4–6, 2–6
Loss	0–2	Mar 2023	ITF Tucumán, Argentina	W25	Clay	(Argentina) Guillermina Naya	(Ukraine) Valeriya Strakhova (Latvia) Daniela Vismane	3–6, 6–3, [11–13]
Win	1–2	Mar 2023	ITF Sopo, Colombia	W25	Clay	(Argentina) Guillermina Naya	(United States) Victoria Hu (Argentina) Melany Krywoj	7–5, 6–4
Win	2–2	Aug 2023	Aberto da República, Brazil	W80	Hard	(Brazil) Carolina Alves	(United Kingdom) Eden Silva (Ukraine) Valeriya Strakhova	6–2, 6–3
Win	3–2	Sep 2024	ITF Pilar, Argentina	W50	Clay	(Brazil) Carolina Alves	(Italy) Nicole Fossa Huergo (Kazakhstan) Zhibek Kulambayeva	6–4, 7–5
Loss	3–3	Mar 2025	Vacaria Open, Brazil	W75	Clay (i)	(Greece) Despina Papamichail	(United States) Robin Anderson (Spain) Alicia Herrero Liñana	5–7, 4–6
Win	4–3	Jul 2025	ITF Pergamino, Argentina	W35	Clay	(Argentina) Martina Capurro Taborda	(Argentina) Luisina Giovannini (Mexico) Marian Gómez Pezuela	6–4, 6–2
Win	5–3	Jun 2026	ITF Stuttgart-Vaihingen, Germany	W50	Clay	(Argentina) María Lourdes Carlé	(Ukraine) Anastasiia Sobolieva (Ukraine) Anastasiya Zaparyniuk	6–2, 6–3
