= Wiesbaden Tennis Open =

- 2026 Wiesbaden Tennis Open

ITF Women's Tour
- Event name: Wiesbaden Tennis Open
- Location: Wiesbaden, Germany
- Venue: TC Bierstadt
- Category: ITF Women's Circuit
- Surface: Clay
- Draw: 32S/24Q/16D
- Prize money: $100,000
- Website: www.wiesbaden-tennis-open.de

The Wiesbaden Tennis Open is a tournament for professional female tennis players played on outdoor clay courts. The event is classified as a $100,000 ITF Women's Circuit tournament and has been held in Wiesbaden, Germany, since 2012.

== Past finals ==
=== Singles ===
| Year | Champion | Runner-up | Score |
|---|---|---|---|
| 2026 | (Germany) Noma Noha Akugue | (Slovakia) Mia Pohánková | 6–2, 7–6^{(7–3)} |
| 2025 | (Hungary) Anna Bondár (2) | (Austria) Julia Grabher | 6–2, 6–4 |
| 2024 | (Argentina) Julia Riera | (Germany) Jule Niemeier | 3–6, 6–3, 6–2 |
| 2023 | Elina Avanesyan | (Australia) Jaimee Fourlis | 6–2, 6–0 |
| 2022 | (Montenegro) Danka Kovinić | (Germany) Nastasja Schunk | 6–3, 7–6^{(7–0)} |
| 2021 | (Hungary) Anna Bondár | (France) Clara Burel | 6–2, 6–4 |
| 2020 | Tournament cancelled due to the COVID-19 pandemic | | |
| 2019 | (Czech Republic) Barbora Krejčíková | (Ukraine) Katarina Zavatska | 6–4, 7–6^{(7–2)} |
| 2018 | (Liechtenstein) Kathinka von Deichmann (2) | (Ukraine) Katarina Zavatska | 6–3, 6–2 |
| 2017 | (Liechtenstein) Kathinka von Deichmann | (Croatia) Petra Martić | 4–6, 6–4, 7–6^{(9–7)} |
| 2016 | (Russia) Victoria Kan | (Germany) Laura Schaeder | 6–2, 4–6, 6–0 |
| 2015 | (Latvia) Anastasija Sevastova | (Czech Republic) Tereza Martincová | 6–1, 6–3 |
| 2014 | (Russia) Ekaterina Alexandrova | (Austria) Tamira Paszek | 7–6^{(7–4)}, 4–6, 6–3 |
| 2013 | (Austria) Yvonne Meusburger | (Canada) Sharon Fichman | 5–7, 6–4, 6–1 |
| 2012 | (Kazakhstan) Anna Danilina | (Germany) Laura Siegemund | 7–6^{(7–2)}, 7–6^{(7–4)} |
| 2011 | (Colombia) Yuliana Lizarazo | (Netherlands) Marcella Koek | 6–1, 7–6^{(7–5)} |
| 2010 | (Germany) Scarlett Werner | (Netherlands) Elise Tamaëla | 5–7, 6–2, 6–4 |
| 2009 | (Germany) Julia Babilon | (Croatia) Darija Jurak | 6–1, 6–2 |

=== Doubles ===
| Year | Champions | Runners-up | Score |
|---|---|---|---|
| 2026 | (Croatia) Lucija Ćirić Bagarić (Slovenia) Nika Radišić | (Czech Republic) Lucie Havlíčková (Czech Republic) Anna Sisková | 5–7, 7–6^{(7–3)}, [10–5] |
| 2025 | (Kazakhstan) Zhibek Kulambayeva (Latvia) Darja Semeņistaja | (Czech Republic) Jesika Malečková (Czech Republic) Miriam Škoch | 4–6, 6–3, [11–9] |
| 2024 | (United Kingdom) Samantha Murray Sharan (Brazil) Laura Pigossi | (Japan) Himeno Sakatsume (Bosnia and Herzegovina) Anita Wagner | 7–5, 6–2 |
| 2023 | (Australia) Jaimee Fourlis (Australia) Olivia Gadecki | (United Kingdom) Emily Appleton (Germany) Julia Lohoff | 6–1, 6–4 |
| 2022 | Amina Anshba (Hungary) Panna Udvardy | (Venezuela) Andrea Gámiz (Netherlands) Eva Vedder | 6–2, 6–4 |
| 2021 | (Hungary) Anna Bondár (Belgium) Lara Salden | (Netherlands) Arianne Hartono (Australia) Olivia Tjandramulia | 6–7^{(9–11)}, 6–2, [10–4] |
| 2020 | Tournament cancelled due to the COVID-19 pandemic | | |
| 2019 | (Russia) Anna Blinkova (Belgium) Yanina Wickmayer | (Australia) Jaimee Fourlis (Liechtenstein) Kathinka von Deichmann | 6–3, 4–6, [10–3] |
| 2018 | (Belgium) Hélène Scholsen (South Africa) Chanel Simmonds | (Sweden) Cornelia Lister (United States) Sabrina Santamaria | 6–3, 2–6, [10–8] |
| 2017 | (Germany) Vivian Heisen (Australia) Storm Sanders | (Latvia) Diāna Marcinkēviča (Switzerland) Rebeka Masarova | 7–5, 5–7, [10–8] |
| 2016 | (Belgium) Marie Benoît (Netherlands) Arantxa Rus | (Belgium) Steffi Distelmans (Netherlands) Demi Schuurs | 6–2, 6–2 |
| 2015 | (Germany) Carolin Daniels (Switzerland) Viktorija Golubic | (Netherlands) Cindy Burger (Ukraine) Veronika Kapshay | 6–4, 4–6, [10–6] |
| 2014 | (Switzerland) Viktorija Golubic (Latvia) Diāna Marcinkēviča | (Israel) Julia Glushko (Luxembourg) Mandy Minella | 6–4, 6–3 |
| 2013 | (Canada) Gabriela Dabrowski (Canada) Sharon Fichman | (Germany) Dinah Pfizenmaier (Germany) Anna Zaja | 6–3, 6–3 |
| 2012 | (Germany) Laura Siegemund (United States) Caitlin Whoriskey | (Russia) Alexandra Romanova (Poland) Sylwia Zagórska | 6–0, 6–0 |
| 2011 | (Romania) Mihaela Buzărnescu (Australia) Karolina Wlodarczak | (Germany) Dejana Raickovic (Netherlands) Ghislaine van Baal | 6–7^{(4–7)}, 6–3, [10–6] |
| 2010 | (Serbia) Barbara Bonić (Serbia) Nataša Zorić | (Netherlands) Quirine Lemoine (Netherlands) Marlot Meddens | 6–2, 6–2 |
| 2009 | (Netherlands) Leonie Mekel (Netherlands) Pauline Wong | (Romania) Alexandra Cadanțu (Romania) Alexandra Stuparu | 6–1, 6–3 |
