= Jaimee Fourlis =

Australian tennis player (born 1999)

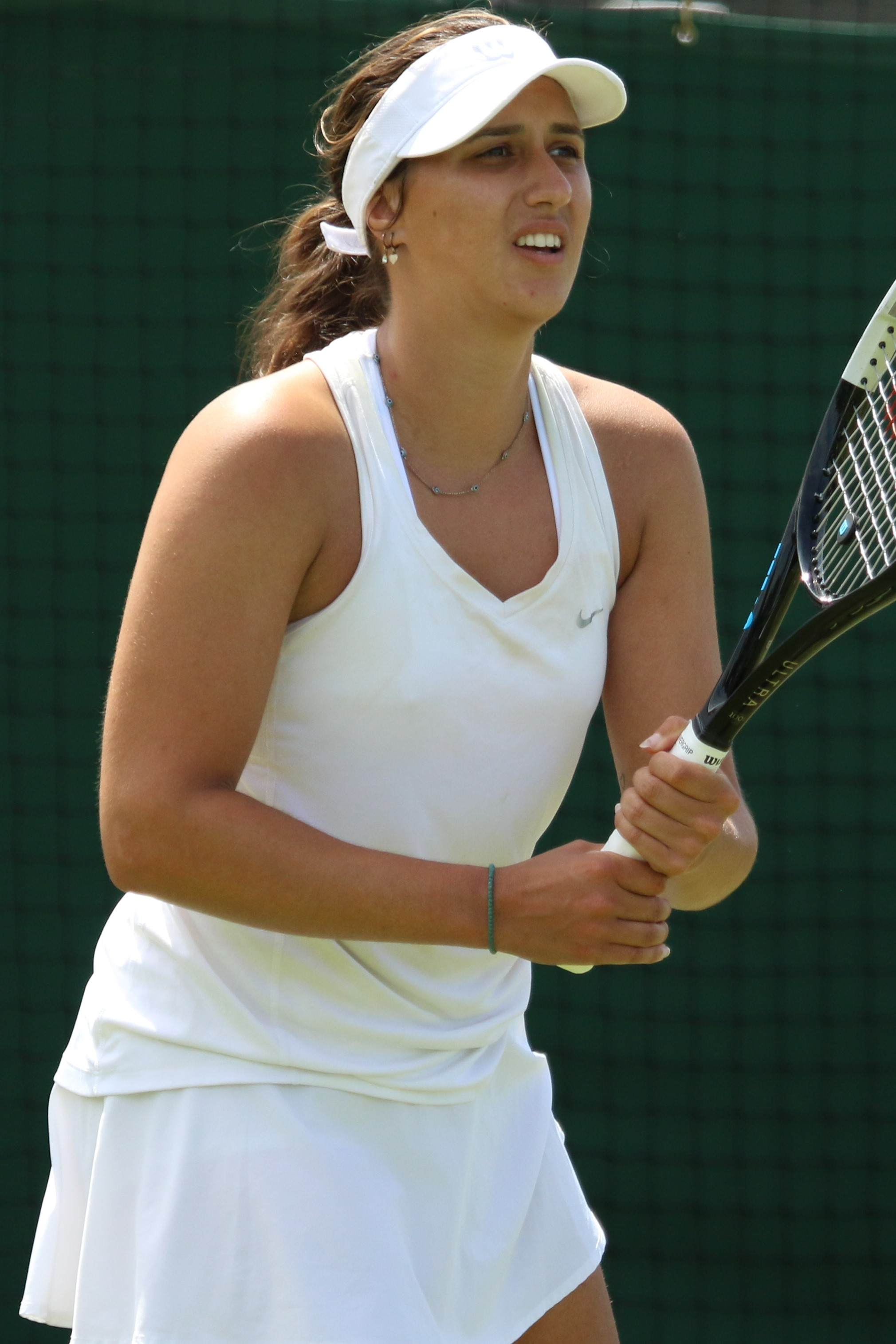
- Fourlis at the 2022 Wimbledon Championships
- Country (sports): Australia
- Residence: Melbourne, Australia
- Born: 17 September 1999 (age 27) Melbourne
- Height: 1.68 m (5 ft 6 in)
- Plays: Right (two-handed backhand)
- Prize money: US$1,031,158

Singles
- Career record: 236–174
- Career titles: 9 ITF
- Highest ranking: No. 147 (18 July 2022)

Grand Slam singles results
- Australian Open: 2R (2017)
- French Open: 1R (2017)
- Wimbledon: 1R (2022)
- US Open: 1R (2022)

Doubles
- Career record: 114–71
- Career titles: 1 WTA125, 10 ITF
- Highest ranking: No. 138 (2 March 2020)

Grand Slam doubles results
- Australian Open: 2R (2020)

Grand Slam mixed doubles results
- Australian Open: F (2022)
- Last updated on: 5 June 2026.

Jaimee Fourlis (born 17 September 1999) is an Australian inactive tennis player of Greek descent. She has a career-high singles ranking of world No. 147, achieved on 18 July 2022, and a highest doubles ranking of No. 138, reached on 2 March 2020.

Partnering Jason Kubler, Fourlis was runner-up in the mixed doubles at the 2022 Australian Open. She has won one WTA 125 doubles title and ten on the ITF Women's Circuit as well as nine ITF singles titles.

== Personal life ==
She grew up in Melbourne and attended Northcote High School. Her family comes from Agrinio and Thessaloniki, Greece. Her Greek Orthodox name is Dimitra.

== Career ==
=== 2014–2016: ITF Circuit debut, first title ===
Fourlis made her ITF Women's Circuit debut in Glen Iris in March 2014. Her first win came in October 2014 in Cairns when her opponent Carolin Daniels retired.

In 2016, she commenced the year at the Perth $25k event, where from qualifying she won eight matches en route to her first title.

Fourlis reached the girls' doubles semifinals of the 2016 Australian Open, partnering with Maddison Inglis.

=== 2017-2018: Grand Slam tournament debut ===
Fourlis was given a wildcard into the 2017 Hobart International where she lost to Kirsten Flipkens in the opening round. She made her Grand Slam tournament debut at the 2017 Australian Open, after winning the Wildcard Playoff. She defeated Anna Tatishvili before losing to Svetlana Kuznetsova in the second round. In May, she won an Australian wildcard playoff into the French Open, losing to former world No. 1, Caroline Wozniacki, in three sets. In December, Fourlis won the Under-18 Australian Championships and received a main-draw wildcard to the 2018 Australian Open.

Fourlis was given a wildcard into the 2018 Hobart International where she defeated Nina Stojanović, before losing to Heather Watson in the second round. At the 2018 Australian Open, she lost to Olivia Rogowska in the first round.

In April 2018, Fourlis won her second and third ITF titles. In June, her ranking peaked inside the world's top 200.

=== 2019–2020 ===
In January 2019, Fourlis lost in the first round of qualifying for the Australian Open. She spent the next months of 2019 on the ITF Circuit with her best performance being a semifinal result in Rome in May and Barcelona in June. In July 2019, she qualified for the WTA Tour events in Bucharest and Palermo. Following a first-round loss in Perth in March 2020, she underwent shoulder surgery.

=== 2021-2023: Australian Open mixed doubles finalist, Wimbledon debut ===
In August 2021, Fourlis won her fourth ITF tournament, and first since returning to the tour in June.

Given a wildcard partnering Jason Kubler, Fourlis reached the final in the mixed doubles at the 2022 Australian Open which they lost to fifth seeds Kristina Mladenovic and Ivan Dodig. She qualified for 2022 Wimbledon Championships, making her main-draw debut at this major, but lost in the first round to Kirsten Flipkens.

Awarded a wildcard, Fourlis lost in the first round at the 2023 Australian Open to Linda Fruhvirtová. At the 2023 German Open, she qualified for the main draw and reached the second round, after fellow qualifier Wang Xinyu retired. She lost to third seed Caroline Garcia.

=== 2025: First WTA 125 doubles title ===
Partnering Petra Hule, Fourlis won her first WTA 125 doubles title at the Canberra Tennis International, defeating Darja Semeņistaja and Nina Stojanović in the final.

== Performance timelines ==
Key
W	F	SF	QF	#R	RR	Q#	P#	DNQ	A	Z#	PO	G	S	B	NMS	NTI	P	NH

(W) winner; (F) finalist; (SF) semifinalist; (QF) quarterfinalist; (#R) rounds 4, 3, 2, 1; (RR) round-robin stage; (Q#) qualification round; (P#) preliminary round; (DNQ) did not qualify; (A) absent; (Z#) Davis/Fed Cup Zonal Group (with number indication) or (PO) play-off; (G) gold, (S) silver or (B) bronze Olympic/Paralympic medal; (NMS) not a Masters tournament; (NTI) not a Tier I tournament; (P) postponed; (NH) not held; (SR) strike rate (events won / competed); (W–L) win–loss record.
To avoid confusion and double counting, these charts are updated at the conclusion of a tournament or when the player's participation has ended.

Only main-draw results in WTA Tour, Grand Slam tournaments, Billie Jean King Cup, United Cup, Hopman Cup and Olympic Games are included in win–loss records.

=== Singles ===
Current through the 2025 Australian Open.

Tournament	2017	2018	2019	2020	2021	2022	2023	2024	2025	SR	W–L	Win %
Grand Slam tournaments
Australian Open	2R	1R	Q1	Q1	A	Q2	1R	Q1	Q1	0 / 3	1–3	25%
French Open	1R	A	A	A	A	Q2	Q3	Q1	A	0 / 1	0–1	0%
Wimbledon	A	Q1	A	NH	A	1R	Q2	A	A	0 / 1	0–1	0%
US Open	A	Q3	Q3	A	Q1	1R	Q1	A	A	0 / 1	0–1	0%
Win–loss	1–2	0–1	0–0	0–0	0–0	0–2	0–1	0–0	0–0	0 / 6	1–6	14%
WTA 1000
Italian Open	A	A	A	A	A	A	Q1	A	A	0 / 0	0–0	–
Guadalajara Open	NH					Q1	A	A	A	0 / 0	0–0	–
Career statistics
Tournaments	3	2	2	0	0	5	3	0	0	Career total: 15		
Overall win-loss	1–3	1–2	1–2	0–0	0–0	0–5	0–3	0–0	0–0	0 / 15	3–15	17%
Year-end ranking	327	202	245	264	323	162	204	326	642	$783,357		

=== Mixed doubles ===
Tournament	2022	2023	2024	SR	W–L
Australian Open	F	1R	SF	0 / 3	7–3
French Open	A	A	A	0 / 0	0–0
Wimbledon	A	A	A	0 / 0	0–0
US Open	A	A	A	0 / 0	0–0
Win–loss	4–1	0–1	3–1	0 / 3	7–3

== Grand Slam tournament finals ==
=== Mixed doubles: 1 runner-up ===
Result	Year	Tournament	Surface	Partner	Opponents	Score
Loss	2022	Australian Open	Hard	(Australia) Jason Kubler	(France) Kristina Mladenovic (Croatia) Ivan Dodig	3–6, 4–6

== WTA 125 finals ==
=== Doubles: 1 title ===
Result	Date	Tournament	Surface	Partner	Opponents	Score
Win	Jan 2025	Canberra International, Australia	Hard	(Australia) Petra Hule	(Latvia) Darja Semeņistaja (Serbia) Nina Stojanović	7–5, 4–6, [10–6]

== ITF Circuit finals ==
=== Singles: 11 (9 titles, 2 runner-ups) ===
Legend W100 tournaments W60 tournaments W25 tournaments W15 tournaments	Finals by surface Hard (5–0) Clay (4–2)

Result	W–L	Date	Tournament	Tier	Surface	Opponent	Score
Win	1–0	Feb 2016	ITF Perth, Australia	15k	Hard	(South Korea) Jang Su-jeong	6–4, 2–6, 7–6^{(1)}
Win	2–0	Apr 2018	Clay Court International, Australia	15k	Clay	(Australia) Ellen Perez	6–3, 6–2
Win	3–0	Apr 2018	ITF Pula, Italy	15k	Clay	(Italy) Anastasia Grymalska	6–4, 4–6, 6–0
Win	4–0	Aug 2021	ITF Ourense, Spain	W25	Clay	(Hungary) Fanny Stollár	7–6^{(3)}, 6–3
Win	5–0	Mar 2022	Bendigo Pro Tour 2, Australia	W25	Hard	(Australia) Olivia Gadecki	6–3, 0–0 ret.
Win	6–0	Jun 2022	Brașov Open, Romania	W60	Clay	(Turkey) İpek Öz	7–6^{(0)}, 6–2
Win	7–0	Jun 2022	ITF Madrid, Spain	W25	Hard	(Spain) Guiomar Maristany	6–4, 6–2
Loss	7–1	Jul 2022	ITF Horb, Germany	W25	Clay	(Russia) Ekaterina Makarova	1–6, 0–6
Win	8–1	Feb 2023	Burnie International, Australia	W25	Hard	(Australia) Olivia Gadecki	6–4, 6–3
Loss	8–2	May 2023	Wiesbaden Open, Germany	W100	Clay	(Russia) Elina Avanesyan	2–6, 0–6
Win	9–2	Jul 2024	Amstelveen Open, Netherlands	W35	Clay	(Turkey) Berfu Cengiz	7–6^{(2)}, 2–6, 6–1

=== Doubles: 21 (10 titles, 11 runner-ups) ===
Legend W100 tournaments (1–0) W80 tournaments (0–1) W60/75 tournaments (3–3) W25/35 tournaments (6–7)	Finals by surface Hard (4–5) Clay (6–6)

Result	W–L	Date	Tournament	Tier	Surface	Partner	Opponents	Score
Loss	0–1	May 2018	ITF Caserta, Italy	W25	Clay	(Australia) Ellen Perez	(Chinese Taipei) Chen Pei-hsuan (Chinese Taipei) Wu Fang-hsien	6–7^{(6)}, 3–6
Win	1–1	Mar 2019	Clay Court International, Australia	W25	Clay	(Australia) Alison Bai	(United Kingdom) Naiktha Bains (Slovakia) Tereza Mihalíková	6–2, 6–2
Loss	1–2	Apr 2019	Chiasso Open, Switzerland	W25	Clay	(Canada) Sharon Fichman	(Spain) Cristina Bucșa (Ukraine) Marta Kostyuk	1–6, 6–3, [7–10]
Loss	1–3	May 2019	Wiesbaden Open, Germany	W60	Clay	(Liechtenstein) Kathinka von Deichmann	(Russia) Anna Blinkova (Belgium) Yanina Wickmayer	3–6, 6–4, [3–10]
Loss	1–4	Sep 2019	Darwin International, Australia	W60	Hard	(Australia) Alison Bai	(Australia) Destanee Aiava (Australia) Lizette Cabrera	4–6, 6–2, [3–10]
Loss	1–5	Oct 2019	Tennis Classic of Macon, United States	W80	Hard	(Greece) Valentini Grammatikopoulou	(United States) Usue Maitane Arconada (United States) Caroline Dolehide	7–6^{(2)}, 2–6, [8–10]
Win	2–5	Jan 2020	Canberra International, (Note: Tournament was moved from Canberra to Bendigo due to the smoke affecting Canberra from the 2019–20 Australian bushfire season.) Australia	W25	Hard	(Australia) Alison Bai	(Hungary) Anna Bondár (Turkey) Pemra Özgen	5–7, 6–4, [10–8]
Win	3–5	Feb 2020	Launceston International, Australia	W25	Hard	(Australia) Alison Bai	(Australia) Alicia Smith (Papua New Guinea) Abigail Tere-Apisah	7–6^{(4)}, 6–3
Loss	3–6	Feb 2020	ITF Perth, Australia	W25	Hard	(New Zealand) Erin Routliffe	(Japan) Kanako Morisaki (Japan) Erika Sema	5–7, 4–6
Loss	3–7	Aug 2021	Reinert Open, Germany	W60	Clay	(Sweden) Mirjam Björklund	(Kazakhstan) Anna Danilina (Ukraine) Valeriya Strakhova	6–4, 5–7, [4–10]
Loss	3–8	Feb 2022	ITF Canberra Pro 2, Australia	W25	Hard	(Australia) Alison Bai	(United States) Asia Muhammad (Australia) Arina Rodionova	3–6, 6–3, [6–10]
Win	4–8	Mar 2022	Bendigo Pro Tour 2, Australia	W25	Hard	(Australia) Ellen Perez	(Australia) Alana Parnaby (Australia) Gabriella Da Silva Fick	6–1, 6–1
Loss	4–9	Feb 2022	ITF Canberra Pro 1, Australia	W25	Hard	(Australia) Alison Bai	(United States) Asia Muhammad (Australia) Arina Rodionova	6–7^{(2)}, 6–7^{(5)}
Loss	4–10	Jul 2022	ITF Horb, Germany	W25	Clay	(Australia) Alana Parnaby	(Russia) Ekaterina Makarova (Russia) Ekaterina Reyngold	6–2, 4–6, [8–10]
Win	5–10	Oct 2022	ITF Šibenik, Croatia	W25	Clay	(Poland) Weronika Falkowska	(Greece) Eleni Christofi (United States) Christina Rosca	6–4, 6–2
Win	6–10	May 2023	Wiesbaden Open, Germany	W100	Clay	(Australia) Olivia Gadecki	(United Kingdom) Emily Appleton (Germany) Julia Lohoff	6–1, 6–4
Win	7–10	May 2024	Prague Open, Czech Republic	W75	Clay	(Czech Republic) Dominika Šalková	(Germany) Noma Noha Akugue (Germany) Ella Seidel	5–7, 7–5, [10–4]
Loss	7–11	Jun 2024	ITF Gdansk, Poland	W35	Clay	(Australia) Petra Hule	(Czech Republic) Karolína Kubáňová (Czech Republic) Renata Voráčová	6–3, 6–7^{(5)}, [7–10]
Win	8–11	Jul 2024	ITF The Hague, Netherlands	W75	Clay	(Australia) Petra Hule	(Netherlands) Annelin Bakker (Netherlands) Sarah van Emst	6–4, 6–2
Win	9–11	Jul 2024	ITF Darmstadt, Germany	W35	Hard	(Australia) Petra Hule	(Czech Republic) Karolína Kubáňová (Greece) Sapfo Sakellaridi	7–6^{(6)}, 6–4
Win	10–11	Oct 2024	Edmond Open, United States	W75	Hard	(United States) Kayla Day	(United States) Sophie Chang (United States) Rasheeda McAdoo	7–5, 7–5
