= Anna Klasen =

German tennis player (born 1993)

- Country (sports): Germany
- Born: 15 November 1993 (age 32)
- Plays: Right-handed (two-handed backhand)
- Prize money: US$73,708

Singles
- Career record: 222–200
- Career titles: 2 ITF
- Highest ranking: No. 426 (6 April 2015)
- Current ranking: No. 968 (4 December 2023)

Doubles
- Career record: 171–140
- Career titles: 15 ITF
- Highest ranking: No. 341 (19 September 2016)
- Current ranking: No. 569 (4 December 2023)
- Last updated on: 4 December 2023.

Anna Klasen (born 15 November 1993) is a German tennis player.

Klasen has a career-high singles ranking by the Women's Tennis Association (WTA) of world No. 426, achieved on 6 April 2015, and a doubles ranking of No. 341, achieved on 19 September 2016. She has won two singles titles and 15 doubles titles on the ITF Circuit. Her younger sister Charlotte Klasen was also a professional tennis player.

Klasen made her WTA Tour main-draw debut at the 2022 Hamburg European Open in the doubles draw, partnering Tamara Korpatsch.

== ITF Circuit finals ==
=== Singles: 5 (2 titles, 3 runner–ups) ===
Legend
$25,000 tournaments (0–1)
$10,000 tournaments (2–2)

Result	W–L	Date	Tournament	Tier	Surface	Opponent	Score
Win	1–0	Jul 2013	ITF Brussels, Belgium	10,000	Clay	(Russia) Eugeniya Pashkova	6–3, 6–3
Loss	1–1	Oct 2014	ITF Pula, Italy	10,000	Clay	(Romania) Ilka Csöregi	6–7^{(4)}, 6–7^{(3)}
Loss	1–2	Oct 2014	ITF Pula, Italy	10,000	Clay	(Italy) Corinna Dentoni	3–6, 3–6
Win	2–2	Nov 2014	ITF Sousse, Tunisia	10,000	Hard	(Netherlands) Mandy Wagemaker	4–6, 7–5, 6–4
Loss	2–3	Aug 2021	ITF Braunschweig, Germany	25,000	Clay	(Germany) Nastasja Schunk	3–6, 1–6

=== Doubles: 26 (15 titles, 11 runner–ups) ===
Legend
$25,000 tournaments (2–2)
$10/15,000 tournaments (13–9)

Result	W–L	Date	Tournament	Tier	Surface	Partner	Opponents	Score
Loss	0–1	Apr 2013	ITF Šibenik, Croatia	10,000	Clay	(Netherlands) Cindy Burger	(Czech Republic) Barbora Krejčíková (Russia) Polina Leykina	6–3, 3–6, [10–12]
Win	1–1	Jul 2013	ITF Brussels, Belgium	10,000	Clay	(Germany) Charlotte Klasen	(Belgium) Michaela Boev (Ukraine) Anastasiya Vasylyeva	6–1, 6–3
Win	2–1	Aug 2013	ITF Ratingen, Germany	10,000	Clay	(Germany) Carolin Daniels	(Netherlands) Bernice van de Velde (Australia) Karolina Wlodarczak	7–5, 6–2
Win	3–1	Sep 2013	ITF Antalya, Turkey	10,000	Clay	(Germany) Lena-Marie Hofmann	(Thailand) Kamonwan Buayam (Czech Republic) Barbora Štefková	6–2, 6–2
Win	4–1	Oct 2013	ITF Antalya, Turkey	10,000	Clay	(Germany) Charlotte Klasen	(Kazakhstan) Asiya Dair (Chinese Taipei) Lee Hua-chen	7–6^{(2)}, 6–2
Win	5–1	Nov 2013	ITF Castellón, Spain	10,000	Clay	(Italy) Martina Colmegna	(Spain) Lucía Cervera Vázquez (China) Zhu Aiwen	6–1, 5–7, [10–5]
Loss	5–2	Feb 2014	ITF Bron, France	10,000	Hard (i)	(Philippines) Katharina Lehnert	(Ukraine) Alyona Sotnikova (Bulgaria) Isabella Shinikova	7–5, 6–7^{(5)}, [5–10]
Loss	5–3	Sep 2014	ITF Bol, Croatia	10,000	Clay	(Germany) Charlotte Klasen	(Belgium) Justine De Sutter (Belgium) Sofie Oyen	6–3, 6–7^{(4)}, [7–10]
Win	6–3	Oct 2014	ITF Pula, Italy	10,000	Clay	(Germany) Charlotte Klasen	(Belgium) Marie Benoît (Belgium) Kimberley Zimmermann	6–3, 4–6, [10–8]
Loss	6–4	Oct 2014	ITF Pula, Italy	10,000	Clay	(Germany) Charlotte Klasen	(Switzerland) Lisa Sabino (Germany) Anne Schäfer	4–6, 7–5, [6–10]
Win	7–4	Oct 2014	ITF Pula, Italy	10,000	Clay	(Germany) Charlotte Klasen	(Romania) Diana Enache (Romania) Raluca Elena Platon	6–2, 6–3
Loss	7–5	May 2015	ITF Velenje, Slovenia	10,000	Clay	(Austria) Yvonne Neuwirth	(Slovenia) Nina Potočnik (Slovenia) Natalija Šipek	6–4, 3–6, [4–10]
Loss	7–6	Jun 2015	ITF Alkmaar, Netherlands	10,000	Clay	(Germany) Charlotte Klasen	(Australia) Sally Peers (Poland) Sandra Zaniewska	3–6, 4–6
Loss	7–7	Oct 2015	ITF Sozopol, Bulgaria	10,000	Hard	(Germany) Charlotte Klasen	(Bulgaria) Isabella Shinikova (Bulgaria) Julia Terziyska	2–6, 1–6
Win	8–7	Oct 2015	ITF Antalya, Turkey	10,000	Hard	(Germany) Charlotte Klasen	(Hungary) Anna Bondár (Hungary) Rebeka Stolmár	6–4, 6–4
Win	9–7	Aug 2016	ITF Leipzig, Germany	25,000	Clay	(Germany) Nicola Geuer	(Slovakia) Michaela Hončová (Ukraine) Olga Ianchuk	7–6^{(4)}, 7–5
Win	10–7	Oct 2016	ITF Stockholm, Sweden	10,000	Hard (i)	(Romania) Laura Ioana Paar	(Sweden) Mirjam Björklund (Sweden) Brenda Njuki	6–2, 6–2
Loss	10–8	Mar 2017	ITF Óbidos, Portugal	15,000	Carpet	(Netherlands) Erika Vogelsang	(United Kingdom) Manisha Foster (Belgium) Hélène Scholsen	6–7^{(6)}, 1–6
Win	11–8	Apr 2017	ITF Óbidos, Portugal	15,000	Carpet	(Netherlands) Erika Vogelsang	(United Kingdom) Olivia Nicholls (United Kingdom) Laura Sainsbury	6–3, 4–6, [10–6]
Loss	11–9	Mar 2018	ITF Solarino, Italy	15,000	Carpet	(Germany) Romy Koelzer	(United States) Quinn Gleason (Belarus) Sviatlana Pirazhenka	4–6, 4–6
Win	12–9	May 2018	ITF Oeiras, Portugal	15,000	Clay	(Germany) Romy Koelzer	(Spain) Alba Carrillo Marín (Portugal) Claudia Cianci	6–3, 6–3
Win	13–9	Jun 2019	ITF Kaltenkirchen, Germany	15,000	Clay	(Australia) Gabriella Da Silva-Fick	(Uzbekistan) Albina Khabibulina (Romania) Oana Georgeta Simion	6–4, 7–5
Loss	13–10	Jul 2019	ITF Den Haag, Netherlands	25,000	Clay	(Australia) Gabriella Da Silva-Fick	(Greece) Valentini Grammatikopoulou (Netherlands) Quirine Lemoine	2–6, 7–5, [3–10]
Win	14–10	Nov 2021	ITF Helsingborg, Sweden	15,000	Hard (i)	(Germany) Phillippa Preugschat	(Russia) Tatiana Barkova (Hungary) Natália Szabanin	1–6, 6–3, [11–9]
Win	15–10	Aug 2022	ITF Braunschweig, Germany	25,000	Clay	(Italy) Martina Colmegna	(Slovenia) Veronika Erjavec (Poland) Weronika Falkowska	6–3, 2–6, [10–5]
Loss	15–11	Nov 2022	ITF Helsinki, Finland	25,000	Hard (i)	(Belgium) Eliessa Vanlangendonck	(Serbia) Katarina Jokić (United States) Taylor Ng	6–3, 2–6, [7–10]
