= 2024 WTA Argentina Open – Doubles =

Doubles
- 2024 WTA Argentina Open

Final
- Champions: (Poland) Maja Chwalińska (Poland) Katarzyna Kawa
- Runners-up: (Brazil) Laura Pigossi (Egypt) Mayar Sherif
- Score: 6–4, 3–6, [10–7]

Events
Singles	Doubles
← 2023 ·	WTA Argentine Open	· 2025 →

Maja Chwalińska and Katarzyna Kawa won the doubles title at the 2024 WTA Argentina Open, defeating Laura Pigossi and Mayar Sherif in the final, 6–4, 3–6, [10–7].

María Lourdes Carlé and Despina Papamichail were the reigning champions, but did not participate this year.

== Seeds ==
1. (Portugal) Francisca Jorge / (Brazil) Ingrid Martins (semifinals)
2. (United States) Jessie Aney / Amina Anshba (quarterfinals)

== Draw ==
=== Key ===
- Q = Qualifier
- WC = Wild card
- LL = Lucky loser
- Alt = Alternate
- SE = Special exempt
- PR = Protected ranking
- ITF = ITF entry
- JE = Junior exempt
- w/o = Walkover
- r = Retired
- d = Defaulted
- SR = Special ranking

=== Draw ===
Quarterfinals
1	(Portugal) F Jorge (Brazil) I Martins	6	6
I Shymanovich (Serbia) N Stojanović	3	4
WC	(Argentina) J Estable (Argentina) L Giovannini	3	3
(Brazil) L Pigossi (Egypt) M Sherif	6	6
Alt	(Colombia) MP Pérez (Argentina) J Riera	4	4
(Italy) N Fossa Huergo (Ukraine) V Strakhova	6	6
(Poland) M Chwalińska (Poland) K Kawa	7	7
2	(United States) J Aney; A Anshba	5	5

Semifinals
1	(Portugal) F Jorge (Brazil) I Martins	3	3
(Brazil) L Pigossi (Egypt) M Sherif	6	6
(Italy) N Fossa Huergo (Ukraine) V Strakhova	3	2
(Poland) M Chwalińska (Poland) K Kawa	6	6

Final
(Brazil) L Pigossi (Egypt) M Sherif	4	6	[7]
(Poland) M Chwalińska (Poland) K Kawa	6	3	[10]
