= 2023 WTA Argentina Open =

- Date: 27 November–3 December 2023
- Edition: 3rd
- Category: WTA 125
- Prize money: $115,000
- Surface: Clay
- Location: Buenos Aires, Argentina
- Venue: Buenos Aires Lawn Tennis Club

Champions

Singles
- (Brazil) Laura Pigossi

Doubles
- (Argentina) María Lourdes Carlé / (Greece) Despina Papamichail
← 2022 ·	WTA Argentine Open	· 2024 →

The 2023 WTA Argentina Open was a professional women's tennis tournament played on outdoor clay courts. It was the third edition of the tournament which was also part of the 2023 WTA 125 tournaments. It took place at the Buenos Aires Lawn Tennis Club in Buenos Aires, Argentina between 27 November and 3 December 2023.

== Singles entrants ==
=== Seeds ===
Country	Player	Rank^{1}	Seed
FRA	Diane Parry	91	1
ITA	Sara Errani	103	2
USA	Elizabeth Mandlik	115	3
~~FRA~~	~~Léolia Jeanjean~~	~~129~~	~~4~~
BRA	Laura Pigossi	138	5
MEX	Renata Zarazúa	151	6
ARG	Julia Riera	156	7
ARG	María Lourdes Carlé	173	8
FRA	Carole Monnet	181	9

- ^{1} Rankings are as of 20 November 2023.

=== Other entrants ===
The following players received wildcards into the singles main draw:

- (Argentina) Julieta Estable
- (Argentina) Luisina Giovannini
- (Argentina) Guillermina Naya
- (Peru) Lucciana Pérez Alarcón

The following player received entry as an alternate:

- (Brazil) Gabriela Cé

The following players received entry from the qualifying draw:

- Amina Anshba
- (Georgia (country)) Ekaterine Gorgodze
- (United States) Varvara Lepchenko
- (United States) Anna Rogers

=== Withdrawals ===
Before the tournament

- (Colombia) Emiliana Arango → replaced by (Argentina) Solana Sierra
- (Romania) Irina-Camelia Begu → replaced by (United States) Robin Montgomery
- (Hungary) Anna Bondár → replaced by (Greece) Despina Papamichail
- (Spain) Jéssica Bouzas Maneiro → replaced by (France) Séléna Janicijevic
- (Poland) Maja Chwalińska → replaced by (Brazil) Carolina Alves
- (France) Fiona Ferro → replaced by (Ukraine) Valeriya Strakhova
- (France) Léolia Jeanjean → replaced by (Brazil) Gabriela Cé
- Anna Kalinskaya → replaced by (Turkey) İpek Öz
- (Croatia) Petra Marčinko → replaced by (Argentina) Martina Capurro Taborda
- (Germany) Jule Niemeier → replaced by (Spain) Leyre Romero Gormaz
- (Colombia) Camila Osorio → replaced by (Romania) Miriam Bulgaru
- (Argentina) Nadia Podoroska → replaced by (France) Carole Monnet
- Iryna Shymanovich → replaced by (Netherlands) Eva Vedder
- (Hungary) Panna Udvardy → replaced by (Greece) Valentini Grammatikopoulou

== Doubles entrants ==
=== Seeds ===
Country	Player	Country	Player	Rank^{1}	Seed
FRA	Diane Parry	UKR	Valeriya Strakhova	186	1
	Amina Anshba	USA	Quinn Gleason	193	2
GER	Julia Lohoff	SUI	Conny Perrin	241	3
GBR	Freya Christie	COL	Yuliana Lizarazo	252	4

- ^{1} Rankings as of 20 November 2023.

=== Other entrants ===
The following pair received a wildcard into the doubles main draw:

- (Argentina) Martina Capurro Taborda / (Argentina) Julieta Estable

== Champions ==
=== Singles ===
- (Brazil) Laura Pigossi def. (Argentina) María Lourdes Carlé, 6–3, 6–2

=== Doubles ===
- (Argentina) María Lourdes Carlé / (Greece) Despina Papamichail def. (Colombia) María Paulina Pérez García / (United States) Sofia Sewing, 6–3, 4–6, [11–9]
