= 2024 WTA Argentina Open =

- Date: 25 November–1 December
- Edition: 4th
- Category: WTA 125
- Prize money: $115,000
- Surface: Clay
- Location: Buenos Aires, Argentina
- Venue: Buenos Aires Lawn Tennis Club

Champions

Singles
- (Egypt) Mayar Sherif

Doubles
- (Poland) Maja Chwalińska / (Poland) Katarzyna Kawa
| ← 2023 · | WTA Argentine Open | · 2025 → |

The 2024 WTA Argentina Open (also known as the IEB+ Argentina Open for sponsorship reasons) was a professional women's tennis tournament played on outdoor clay courts. It was the fourth edition of the tournament and part of the 2024 WTA 125 tournaments. It took place at the Buenos Aires Lawn Tennis Club in Buenos Aires, Argentina between 25 November and 1 December 2024.

== Singles entrants ==
=== Seeds ===
| Country | Player | Rank^{1} | Seed |
|---|---|---|---|
| ~~MEX~~ | ~~Renata Zarazúa~~ | ~~60~~ | ~~1~~ |
| NED | Suzan Lamens | 86 | 2 |
| ARG | María Lourdes Carlé | 94 | 3 |
| EGY | Mayar Sherif | 100 | 4 |
| USA | Robin Montgomery | 106 | 5 |
| ARG | Julia Riera | 113 | 6 |
| LAT | Darja Semeņistaja | 121 | 7 |
| BRA | Laura Pigossi | 129 | 8 |
| USA | Varvara Lepchenko | 141 | 9 |

- ^{1} Rankings are as of 18 November 2024.

=== Other entrants ===
The following players received wildcards into the singles main draw:

- (Argentina) Julia Caffarena
- (Argentina) Martina Capurro Taborda
- (Argentina) Luisina Giovannini
- (Argentina) Jazmín Ortenzi

The following player received entry using a protected ranking:

- (Serbia) Nina Stojanović

The following players received entry as alternates:

- (Poland) Katarzyna Kawa
- Iryna Shymanovich

The following players received entry from the qualifying draw:

- (Brazil) Carolina Alves
- (United States) Robin Anderson
- (Argentina) Victoria Bosio
- (Italy) Nicole Fossa Huergo

=== Withdrawals ===
- (United Kingdom) Francesca Jones → replaced by (Poland) Katarzyna Kawa
- (Mexico) Renata Zarazúa → replaced by Iryna Shymanovich

== Doubles entrants ==
=== Seeds ===
| Country | Player | Country | Player | Rank^{1} | Seed |
|---|---|---|---|---|---|
| POR | Francisca Jorge | BRA | Ingrid Martins | 195 | 1 |
| USA | Jessie Aney | | Amina Anshba | 238 | 2 |

- ^{1} Rankings as of 18 November 2024.

=== Other entrants ===
The following pair received a wildcard into the doubles main draw:

- (Argentina) Julieta Estable / (Argentina) Luisina Giovannini

The following pair received entry as alternates:

- (Colombia) María Paulina Pérez / (Argentina) Julia Riera

=== Withdrawals ===
- (Latvia) Darja Semeņistaja / (Hungary) Panna Udvardy → replaced by (Colombia) María Paulina Pérez / (Argentina) Julia Riera

== Champions ==
=== Singles ===
- (Egypt) Mayar Sherif def. (Poland) Katarzyna Kawa, 6–3, 4-6, 6–4

=== Doubles ===
- (Poland) Maja Chwalińska / (Poland) Katarzyna Kawa def. (Brazil) Laura Pigossi / (Egypt) Mayar Sherif, 6–4, 3–6, [10–7]
