= 2024 WTA Argentina Open – Singles =

Singles
- 2024 WTA Argentina Open

Final
- Champion: (Egypt) Mayar Sherif
- Runner-up: (Poland) Katarzyna Kawa
- Score: 6–3, 4–6, 6–4

Events
Singles	Doubles
← 2023 ·	WTA Argentine Open	· 2025 →

Mayar Sherif won the singles title at the 2024 WTA Argentina Open, defeating Katarzyna Kawa in the final, 6–3, 4–6, 6–4.

Laura Pigossi was the defending champion but lost in the second round to Jazmín Ortenzi.

== Seeds ==
1. (Mexico) Renata Zarazúa (withdrew)
2. (Netherlands) Suzan Lamens (second round)
3. (Argentina) María Lourdes Carlé (semifinals)
4. (Egypt) Mayar Sherif (champion)
5. (United States) Robin Montgomery (first round)
6. (Argentina) Julia Riera (quarterfinals)
7. (Latvia) Darja Semeņistaja (quarterfinals)
8. (Brazil) Laura Pigossi (second round)
9. (United States) Varvara Lepchenko (first round)

== Draw ==
Key

- Q = Qualifier
- WC = Wild card
- LL = Lucky loser
- Alt = Alternate
- ITF = ITF entry
- PR = Protected ranking
- SR = Special ranking
- SE = Special exempt
- JE = Junior exempt
- JR = Junior Accelerator Programme entrant
- CO = College Accelerator Programme entrant
- NG = Next Gen Accelerator Program entrant
- w/o = Walkover
- r = Retired
- d = Defaulted

=== Finals ===
Semifinals
Alt	(Poland) Katarzyna Kawa	6	6
3	(Argentina) María Lourdes Carlé	3	4
4	(Egypt) Mayar Sherif	6	6
(Czech Republic) Sára Bejlek	2	3

Final
Alt	(Poland) Katarzyna Kawa	3	6	4
4	(Egypt) Mayar Sherif	6	4	6

=== Top half ===
First round
9	(United States) V Lepchenko	6	2	4
Alt	(Poland) K Kawa	2	6	6
(Hungary) P Udvardy	6	7^{7}
(Cyprus) R Șerban	1	6^{4}
WC	(Argentina) J Caffarena	0	0
(Colombia) E Arango	6	6
(Poland) M Chwalińska	3	6	2
7	(Latvia) D Semeņistaja	6	4	6
3	(Argentina) ML Carlé	6	6
Q	(Argentina) V Bosio	4	2
Alt	I Shymanovich	1	6	0
(Spain) G Maristany	6	2	6
E Makarova	3	6	7
(Romania) M Bulgaru	6	4	5
PR	(Serbia) N Stojanović	4	4
6	(Argentina) J Riera	6	6

Second round
Alt	(Poland) K Kawa	3	6	6
(Hungary) P Udvardy	6	2	3
(Colombia) E Arango	3	7	4
7	(Latvia) D Semeņistaja	6	5	6
3	(Argentina) ML Carlé	6	6
(Spain) G Maristany	0	4
E Makarova	2	6	2
6	(Argentina) J Riera	6	3	6

Quarterfinals
Alt	(Poland) K Kawa	3	7	6
7	(Latvia) D Semeņistaja	6	5	4
3	(Argentina) ML Carlé	6	6
6	(Argentina) J Riera	1	0

Semifinals
Alt	(Poland) K Kawa	6	6
3	(Argentina) ML Carlé	3	4

=== Bottom half ===
First round
8	(Brazil) L Pigossi	6	6
Q	(Italy) N Fossa Huergo	4	4
WC	(Argentina) L Giovannini	2	1
WC	(Argentina) J Ortenzi	6	6
(France) K Mladenovic	7^{7}	6
Q	(Brazil) C Alves	6^{1}	1
(Ukraine) V Strakhova	4	6	1
4	(Egypt) M Sherif	6	4	6
5	(United States) R Montgomery	7	6^{3}	1
(Czech Republic) S Bejlek	5	7^{7}	6
(Spain) Á Fita Boluda	4	6	6
WC	(Argentina) M Capurro Taborda	6	3	1
(France) L Jeanjean	6	6
(Portugal) F Jorge	4	3
Q	(United States) R Anderson	3	1
2	(Netherlands) S Lamens	6	6

Second round
8	(Brazil) L Pigossi	2	2
WC	(Argentina) J Ortenzi	6	6
(France) K Mladenovic	2	2
4	(Egypt) M Sherif	6	6
(Czech Republic) S Bejlek	6	6
(Spain) Á Fita Boluda	2	1
(France) L Jeanjean	4	6	6
2	(Netherlands) S Lamens	6	4	2

Quarterfinals
WC	(Argentina) J Ortenzi	6^{6}	7	4
4	(Egypt) M Sherif	7^{8}	5	6
(Czech Republic) S Bejlek	2	6	6
(France) L Jeanjean	6	4	0

Semifinals
4	(Egypt) M Sherif	6	6
(Czech Republic) S Bejlek	2	3

== Qualifying ==
=== Seeds ===
1. Iryna Shymanovich (moved to main draw)
2. (Poland) Katarzyna Kawa (moved to main draw)
3. (United States) Robin Anderson (qualified)
4. (Italy) Nicole Fossa Huergo (qualified)

=== Qualifiers ===
1. (Brazil) Carolina Alves
2. (Argentina) Victoria Bosio
3. (United States) Robin Anderson
4. (Italy) Nicole Fossa Huergo

=== Qualifying draw ===
==== First qualifier ====
Qualifying competition
Alt	(Brazil) Carolina Alves	2	6	6
	(Italy) Matilde Paoletti	6	4	2

==== Second qualifier ====
Qualifying competition
Alt	Alevtina Ibragimova	6^{4}	2
WC	(Argentina) Victoria Bosio	7^{7}	6

==== Third qualifier ====
Qualifying competition
3	(United States) Robin Anderson	6	6
	(Ukraine) Oleksandra Oliynykova	4	3

==== Fourth qualifier ====
Qualifying competition
4	(Italy) Nicole Fossa Huergo	6	6
WC	(Argentina) Marina Bulbarella	0	0
