= 2025 WTA Argentina Open =

- Date: 24 – 30 November
- Edition: 5th
- Category: WTA 125
- Prize money: $115,000
- Surface: Clay
- Location: Buenos Aires, Argentina
- Venue: Tenis Club Argentino

Champions

Singles
- (Hungary) Panna Udvardy

Doubles
- (Spain) Alicia Herrero Liñana / (Brazil) Laura Pigossi
← 2024 ·	WTA Argentine Open	· 2026 →

The 2025 WTA Argentina Open (also known as the IEB+ Argentina Open for sponsorship reasons) was a professional women's tennis tournament played on outdoor clay courts. It was the fifth edition of the tournament and part of the 2025 WTA 125 tournaments. It took place at the Tenis Club Argentino in Buenos Aires, Argentina between 24 and 30 November 2025.

== Singles entrants ==
=== Seeds ===
Country	Player	Rank^{1}	Seed
EGY	Mayar Sherif	93	1
FRA	Léolia Jeanjean	106	2
HUN	Panna Udvardy	108	3
UKR	Oleksandra Oliynykova	109	4
USA	Caroline Dolehide	112	5
SLO	Veronika Erjavec	114	6
ARG	María Lourdes Carlé	128	7
POL	Maja Chwalińska	133	8

- ^{1} Rankings are as of 17 November 2025.

=== Other entrants ===
The following players received wildcards into the singles main draw:

- (Argentina) Marina Bulbarella
- (Argentina) Luisina Giovannini
- (Peru) Lucciana Pérez Alarcón
- (Argentina) Candela Vázquez

The following players received entry using a protected ranking:

- (Slovenia) Polona Hercog
- (Italy) Martina Trevisan

The following players received entry from the qualifying draw:

- (United States) Ayana Akli
- (Spain) Alicia Herrero Liñana
- (Serbia) Katarina Jokić
- (Spain) Sara Sorribes Tormo

=== Withdrawals ===
- (Armenia) Elina Avanesyan → replaced by (Burundi) Sada Nahimana
- (Czech Republic) Sára Bejlek → replaced by (Czech Republic) Laura Samson
- (United States) Louisa Chirico → replaced by (Spain) Irene Burillo
- (United States) Alycia Parks → replaced by (Greece) Despina Papamichail
- (Mexico) Ana Sofía Sánchez → replaced by (Italy) Jessica Pieri
- (Argentina) Solana Sierra → replaced by (Argentina) Jazmín Ortenzi
- (Mexico) Renata Zarazúa → replaced by (Brazil) Carolina Alves
- (Switzerland) Simona Waltert → replaced by (Netherlands) Eva Vedder

== Doubles entrants ==
=== Seeds ===
Country	Player	Country	Player	Rank^{1}	Seed
ESP	Alicia Herrero Liñana	BRA	Laura Pigossi	199	1
ARG	Nicole Fossa Huergo	CZE	Laura Samson	284	2

- ^{1} Rankings as of 17 November 2025.

=== Other entrants ===
The following pair received a wildcard into the doubles main draw:

- (Argentina) Luciana Moyano / (Argentina) María Florencia Urrutia

=== Withdrawals ===
- (France) Léolia Jeanjean / (Ukraine) Valeriya Strakhova → replaced by (Burundi) Sada Nahimana / Anastasia Zolotareva

== Champions ==
=== Singles ===
- (Hungary) Panna Udvardy def. (United States) Varvara Lepchenko 6–3, 7–5

=== Doubles ===
- (Spain) Alicia Herrero Liñana / (Brazil) Laura Pigossi def. (Argentina) Nicole Fossa Huergo / (Czech Republic) Laura Samson 6–2, 7–6^{(7–5)}
