= 2023 WTA Argentina Open – Singles =

Singles
- 2023 WTA Argentina Open

Final
- Champion: (Brazil) Laura Pigossi
- Runner-up: (Argentina) María Lourdes Carlé
- Score: 6–3, 6–2

Events
| Singles | Doubles |
- WTA Argentine Open

Laura Pigossi won the singles title at the 2023 WTA Argentina Open, defeating María Lourdes Carlé in the final, 6–3, 6–2.

Panna Udvardy was the reigning champion, but withdrew before the tournament began.

== Seeds ==
1. (France) Diane Parry (quarterfinals)
2. (Italy) Sara Errani (first round)
3. (United States) Elizabeth Mandlik (quarterfinals)
4. (France) Léolia Jeanjean (withdrew)
5. (Brazil) Laura Pigossi (champion)
6. (Mexico) Renata Zarazúa (semifinals)
7. (Argentina) Julia Riera (semifinals)
8. (Argentina) María Lourdes Carlé (final)
9. (France) Carole Monnet (first round, retired)

== Draw ==
Key

- Q = Qualifier
- WC = Wild card
- LL = Lucky loser
- Alt = Alternate
- ITF = ITF entry
- PR = Protected ranking
- SR = Special ranking
- SE = Special exempt
- JE = Junior exempt
- JR = Junior Accelerator Programme entrant
- CO = College Accelerator Programme entrant
- NG = Next Gen Accelerator Program entrant
- w/o = Walkover
- r = Retired
- d = Defaulted

=== Finals ===
Semifinals
8 | (Argentina) María Lourdes Carlé | 2 | 6 | 6
7 | (Argentina) Julia Riera | 6 | 3 | 1
6 | (Mexico) Renata Zarazúa | 4 | 6 | 6^{2}
5 | (Brazil) Laura Pigossi | 6 | 1 | 7^{7}

Final
8 | (Argentina) María Lourdes Carlé | 3 | 2
5 | (Brazil) Laura Pigossi | 6 | 6

=== Top half ===
First round
1 | (France) D Parry | 6 | 6
Q | (Georgia (country)) E Gorgodze | 1 | 2
WC | (Argentina) J Estable | 6 | 1 | 6
WC | (Peru) L Pérez Alarcón | 2 | 6 | 2
(Greece) V Grammatikopoulou | 6^{1} | 0
(Turkey) İ Öz | 7^{7} | 6
Alt | (Brazil) G Cé | 6 | 0 | 3
8 | (Argentina) ML Carlé | 3 | 6 | 6
9 | (France) C Monnet | 4 | 2^{r}
(Slovenia) P Hercog | 6 | 0
WC | (Argentina) G Naya | 5 | 7 | 1^{r}
(Ukraine) V Strakhova | 7 | 5 | 2
(Romania) M Bulgaru | 6 | 6
Q | A Anshba | 3 | 4
(France) S Janicijevic | 5 | 3
7 | (Argentina) J Riera | 7 | 6

Second round
1 | (France) D Parry | 6 | 6
WC | (Argentina) J Estable | 3 | 3
(Turkey) İ Öz | 1 | 3
8 | (Argentina) ML Carlé | 6 | 6
(Slovenia) P Hercog | 6 | 1 | 6
(Ukraine) V Strakhova | 1 | 6 | 3
(Romania) M Bulgaru | 2 | 3
7 | (Argentina) J Riera | 6 | 6

Quarterfinals
1 | (France) D Parry | 6^{2} | 3
8 | (Argentina) ML Carlé | 7^{7} | 6
(Slovenia) P Hercog | 3 | 4
7 | (Argentina) J Riera | 6 | 6

Semifinals
8 | (Argentina) ML Carlé | 2 | 6 | 6
7 | (Argentina) J Riera | 6 | 3 | 1

=== Bottom half ===
First round
6 | (Mexico) R Zarazúa | 7^{7} | 7
(Netherlands) E Vedder | 6^{3} | 5
WC | (Argentina) L Giovannini | 6 | 6
Q | (United States) A Rogers | 2 | 3
(Greece) D Papamichail | 3 | 2
(United States) J Loeb | 6 | 6
(Argentina) M Capurro Taborda | 6 | 4 | 4
3 | (United States) E Mandlik | 4 | 6 | 6
5 | (Brazil) L Pigossi | 6 | 4 | 6
(Spain) L Romero Gormaz | 4 | 6 | 4
(Brazil) C Alves | 2 | 1
(Switzerland) C Perrin | 6 | 6
(Argentina) S Sierra | 6 | 6
Q | (United States) V Lepchenko | 2 | 2
(United States) R Montgomery | 6 | 6
2 | (Italy) S Errani | 3 | 4

Second round
6 | (Mexico) R Zarazúa | 6 | 6
WC | (Argentina) L Giovannini | 0 | 4
(United States) J Loeb | 0 | 5
3 | (United States) E Mandlik | 6 | 7
5 | (Brazil) L Pigossi | 6 | 6
(Switzerland) C Perrin | 2 | 3
(Argentina) S Sierra | 6 | 7
(United States) R Montgomery | 4 | 5

Quarterfinals
6 | (Mexico) R Zarazúa | 7^{7} | 6
3 | (United States) E Mandlik | 6^{4} | 1
5 | (Brazil) L Pigossi | 2 | 7 | 6
(Argentina) S Sierra | 6 | 5 | 3

Semifinals
6 | (Mexico) R Zarazúa | 4 | 6 | 6^{2}
5 | (Brazil) L Pigossi | 6 | 1 | 7^{7}

== Qualifying ==
=== Seeds ===
1. (United States) Varvara Lepchenko (qualified)
2. (Georgia (country)) Ekaterine Gorgodze (qualified)
3. Amina Anshba (qualified)
4. (United States) Anna Rogers (qualified)

=== Qualifiers ===
1. (United States) Varvara Lepchenko (first round)
2. (Georgia (country)) Ekaterine Gorgodze (first round)
3. Amina Anshba (first round)
4. (United States) Anna Rogers (first round)

=== Qualifying draw ===
==== First qualifier ====
| Qualifying competition |
| 1 | (United States) Varvara Lepchenko | 6 | 6 |
| WC | (Italy) Francesca Mattioli | 0 | 1 |

==== Second qualifier ====
| Qualifying competition |
| 2 | (Georgia (country)) Ekaterine Gorgodze | 6 | 6 |
| | (United Kingdom) Freya Christie | 0 | 0 |

==== Third qualifier ====
| Qualifying competition |
| 3 | Amina Anshba | 6 | 6 |
| WC | (Argentina) Julia Caffarena | 0 | 1 |

==== Fourth qualifier ====
| Qualifying competition |
| 4 | (United States) Anna Rogers | 6 | 6 |
| | (Italy) Nicole Fossa Huergo | 4 | 1 |
