= Sofia Sewing =

American pickleball and tennis player (born 1999)

- Country (sports): United States
- Residence: Miami, Florida, U.S.
- Born: July 22, 1999 (age 26) Miami, Florida, U.S.
- Height: 5 ft 7 in (1.70 m)
- Plays: Right (two-handed backhand)
- College: University of Miami
- Prize money: $76,565

Singles
- Career record: 155–118
- Career titles: 4 ITF
- Highest ranking: No. 455 (March 6, 2023)

Doubles
- Career record: 126–69
- Career titles: 14 ITF
- Highest ranking: No. 125 (January 29, 2024)
- Current ranking: No. 289 (October 28, 2024)
- Last updated on: October 28, 2024.

Sofia Sewing (born July 22, 1999) is an American professional pickleball player and former professional tennis player. She began playing pickleball professionally in 2024 and rapidly rose to prominence on the Association of Pickleball Players (APP) tour.

In tennis, Sewing reached a career-high ITF junior ranking of world No. 9, as well as WTA rankings of 455 in singles and 125 in doubles, before retiring in 2024.

== Pickleball career ==
Sewing had been encouraged by friends and former tennis competitors to consider a switch to pickleball while she was still competing on the tennis tour. After retiring from tennis, she immediately began practicing with pro pickleball players and was invited to compete in an APP tour event just a month later. In the fall of 2024, Sewing began to compete regularly in pro events. She quickly enjoyed success in singles, winning a pair of tournaments overseas, including the PWR India Masters.

Sewing joined the APP tour full-time in 2025, and earned her first singles title in the year's second event, the Vlasic Classic in Daytona Beach, Florida. She also won three of the next four singles titles, and by August was the top-ranked women's singles player on the APP tour. Sewing ended up winning eight APP singles titles in 2025 as well as the singles crown at the USA Pickleball National Championships. She also won four titles in women's doubles and two in mixed doubles.

== Tennis career ==
A talented junior player, Sewing won a number of youth titles, including the prestigious Eddie Herr tournament in back-to-back years. She reached the quarterfinals of the Wimbledon Championships juniors in 2017 and turned pro later that year.

Sewing won four singles and 14 doubles titles at tournaments on the ITF Circuit. In December 2023, she reached her first final on the WTA Challenger Tour, partnering with María Paulina Pérez in Buenos Aires, Argentina, but they lost the match in a super-tiebreaker to María Lourdes Carlé and Despina Papamichail.

Due to chronic knee issues, Sewing stopped playing singles in 2023, and left the tennis tour altogether in April 2024.

== WTA Challenger finals ==
=== Doubles: 1 (runner-up) ===
| Result | W–L | Date | Tournament | Surface | Partner | Opponents | Score |
|---|---|---|---|---|---|---|---|
| Loss | 0–1 | Dec 2023 | Buenos Aires Open, Argentina | Clay | (Colombia) María Paulina Pérez | (Argentina) María Lourdes Carlé (Greece) Despina Papamichail | 3–6, 6–4, [9–11] |

== ITF Circuit finals ==
=== Singles: 8 (4 titles, 4 runner-ups) ===
| Result | W–L | Date | Tournament | Tier | Surface | Opponent | Score |
|---|---|---|---|---|---|---|---|
| Loss | 0–1 | Dec 2017 | ITF Guayaquil, Ecuador | 15,000 | Clay | (Russia) Nika Kukharchuk | 0–6, 6–2, 2–6 |
| Win | 1–1 | May 2019 | ITF Cancún, Mexico | 15,000 | Hard | (United Kingdom) Emilie Lindh | 6–1, 1–6, 6–1 |
| Win | 2–1 | Jan 2020 | ITF Cancún, Mexico | 15,000 | Hard | (Russia) Anastasia Sysoeva | 7–5, 6–0 |
| Win | 3–1 | Sep 2022 | ITF Guayaquil, Ecuador | 15,000 | Clay | (Colombia) María Herazo González | 4–6, 6–3, 6-2 |
| Loss | 3–2 | Oct 2022 | ITF Guayaquil, Ecuador | 15,000 | Clay | (Colombia) María Herazo González | 4–6, 3-6 |
| Loss | 3–3 | Oct 2022 | ITF Bucaramanga, Colombia | 15,000 | Clay | (United States) Kaitlin Quevedo | 3–6, 7–6^{(6)}, 5–7 |
| Loss | 3–4 | Nov 2022 | ITF Lima, Peru | 15,000 | Clay | (Bolivia) Noelia Zeballos | 6–3, 3–6, 0–6 |
| Win | 4–4 | Nov 2022 | ITF Lima, Peru | 15,000 | Clay | (Colombia) María Herazo González | 7–6^{(3)}, 6–1 |

=== Doubles: 25 (14 titles, 11 runner-ups) ===
Legend
$80,000 tournaments (0–1)
$60,000 tournaments (1–0)
$40,000 tournaments (2–1)
$25,000 tournaments (7–5)
$10/15,000 tournaments (4–4)

| Result | W–L | Date | Tournament | Tier | Surface | Partner | Opponent | Score |
|---|---|---|---|---|---|---|---|---|
| Loss | 0–1 | Jun 2016 | ITF Bethany Beach, United States | 10,000 | Clay | (Russia) Veronika Miroshnichenko | (United States) Sophie Chang (United States) Alexandra Mueller | 1–6, 4–6 |
| Win | 1–1 | Nov 2017 | ITF Manta, Ecuador | 15,000 | Hard | (Mexico) María Portillo Ramírez | (United Kingdom) Emily Appleton (Colombia) María Herazo González | 6–1, 6–3 |
| Win | 2–1 | Dec 2017 | ITF Guayaquil, Ecuador | 15,000 | Clay | (Mexico) María Portillo Ramírez | (United States) Stephanie Nemtsova (Peru) Dominique Schaefer | 7–5, 6–2 |
| Loss | 2–2 | Nov 2018 | ITF Norman, US | 25,000 | Hard | (Mexico) María Portillo Ramírez | (Montenegro) Vladica Babić (United States) Ena Shibahara | 2–6, 3–6 |
| Loss | 2–3 | Jun 2019 | ITF Wesley Chapel, US | 15,000 | Clay | (United States) Kylie Collins | (United States) Allura Zamarripa (United States) Maribella Zamarripa | 6–3, 4–6, [11–13] |
| Win | 3–3 | Sep 2019 | ITF Lubbock, US | 15,000 | Hard | (Mexico) María Portillo Ramírez | (United States) Ashlyn Krueger (Japan) Shiori Fukuda | 6–2, 6–4 |
| Loss | 3–4 | Jan 2020 | ITF Cancún, Mexico | W15 | Hard | (Mexico) Victoria Rodríguez | (Netherlands) Lian Tran (Lithuania) Justina Mikulskytė | 2–6, 6–4, [7–10] |
| Loss | 3–5 | Sep 2020 | ITF Prague, Czech Republic | W25 | Clay | (United States) Katie Volynets | (Czech Republic) Anastasia Dețiuc (Czech Republic) Johana Marková | 2–6, 1–6 |
| Loss | 3–6 | Jan 2022 | ITF Blumenau-Gaspar, Brazil | W25 | Clay | (Netherlands) Eva Vedder | (Ecuador) Andrea Gámiz (Chile) Bárbara Gatica | 4–6, 1–6 |
| Win | 4–6 | Jan 2022 | ITF Florianópolis, Brazil | W25 | Hard | (Ecuador) Andrea Gámiz | (Chile) Bárbara Gatica (Brazil) Rebeca Pereira | 6-4, 6-1 |
| Win | 5–6 | Jan 2022 | ITF Florianópolis, Brazil | W25 | Hard | (Ecuador) Andrea Gámiz | (United States) Jessie Aney (Brazil) Ingrid Martins | 7–6^{(2)}, 6–4 |
| Win | 6–6 | Mar 2022 | ITF Guayaquil, Ecuador | W25 | Hard | (Ecuador) Andrea Gámiz | (Italy) Nicole Fossa Huergo (Bolivia) Noelia Zeballos | 6–4, 7–5 |
| Win | 7–6 | Sep 2022 | ITF Guayaquil, Ecuador | W15 | Clay | (Colombia) María Paulina Pérez | (Peru) Romina Ccuno (Colombia) María Herazo González | 6–4, 1–6, [10–2] |
| Loss | 7–7 | Oct 2022 | ITF Guayaquil, Ecuador | W15 | Clay | (Colombia) María Paulina Pérez | (Peru) Romina Ccuno (Colombia) María Herazo González | 2–6, 7–5, [9-11] |
| Loss | 7–8 | Oct 2022 | ITF Ibagué, Colombia | W25 | Clay | (Colombia) María Herazo González | (Colombia) María Paulina Pérez (Colombia) Yuliana Lizarazo | 4–6, 5–7 |
| Win | 8–8 | Feb 2023 | ITF Mexico City, Mexico | W40 | Hard | (Turkey) Berfu Cengiz | (Netherlands) Suzan Lamens (Latvia) Darja Semeņistaja | 6–1, 1–6, [12–10] |
| Win | 9–8 | Feb 2023 | ITF Santo Domingo, Dominican Republic | W25 | Hard | (Latvia) Darja Semeņistaja | (Bosnia and Herzegovina) Nefisa Berberović (Hong Kong) Eudice Chong | 6–3, 6–2 |
| Loss | 9–9 | Apr 2023 | ITF Boca Raton, US | W25 | Clay | (Hungary) Fanny Stollár | (United States) Makenna Jones (United States) Jamie Loeb | 7–5, 3–6, [8–10] |
| Win | 10–9 | April 2023 | ITF Guayaquil, Ecuador | W25 | Clay | (United States) Jessie Aney | (Spain) Noelia Bouzo Zanotti (Bulgaria) Ani Vangelova | 6–0, 6–2 |
| Win | 11–9 | April 2023 | ITF Guayaquil, Ecuador | W25 | Clay | (United States) Jessie Aney | (Brazil) Ana Candiotto (Brazil) Rebeca Pereira | 6–1, 6–2 |
| Loss | 11-10 | Jun 2023 | ITF Otočec, Slovenia | W40 | Clay | (Canada) Kayla Cross | (Georgia (country)) Ekaterine Gorgodze (United States) Elvina Kalieva | 2-6, 3-6 |
| Win | 12–10 | Jun 2023 | ITF Pörtschach, Austria | W25 | Clay | (Poland) Weronika Falkowska | (Romania) Elena-Teodora Cadar (Latvia) Diāna Marcinkēviča | 6–1, 6–2 |
| Win | 13-10 | Jul 2023 | ITF Palma del Río, Spain | W40 | Hard | (Venezuela) Andrea Gámiz | (United States) Robin Anderson (Australia) Elysia Bolton | 6-3, 6–2 |
| Win | 14-10 | Oct 2023 | Georgia's Rome Open, US | W60 | Hard (i) | Anastasia Tikhonova | (United States) Robin Anderson (Mexico) Fernanda Contreras Gómez | 4–6, 6–3, [10–7] |
| Loss | 14-11 | Oct 2023 | Tennis Classic of Macon, US | W80 | Hard | Anastasia Tikhonova | Jana Kolodynska; Tatiana Prozorova | 3–6, 2–6 |
