= 2023 WTA Argentina Open – Doubles =

Doubles
- 2023 WTA Argentina Open

Final
- Champions: (Argentina) María Lourdes Carlé (Greece) Despina Papamichail
- Runners-up: (Colombia) María Paulina Pérez García (United States) Sofia Sewing
- Score: 6–3, 4–6, [11–9]

Events
Singles	Doubles
- WTA Argentine Open

María Lourdes Carlé and Despina Papamichail won the doubles title at the 2023 WTA Argentina Open, defeating María Paulina Pérez García and Sofia Sewing in the final, 6–3, 4–6, [11–9].

Irina Bara and Sara Errani were the reigning champions, but Bara chose not to participate this year. Errani partnered Eva Vedder, but lost in the first round to Ekaterine Gorgodze and Valentini Grammatikopoulou.

== Seeds ==
1. (France) Diane Parry / (Ukraine) Valeriya Strakhova (semifinals)
2. Amina Anshba / (United States) Quinn Gleason (first round)
3. (Germany) Julia Lohoff / (Switzerland) Conny Perrin (quarterfinals)
4. (United Kingdom) Freya Christie / (Colombia) Yuliana Lizarazo (first round)

== Draw ==
Key

- Q = Qualifier
- WC = Wild card
- LL = Lucky loser
- Alt = Alternate
- ITF = ITF entry
- PR = Protected ranking
- SR = Special ranking
- SE = Special exempt
- JE = Junior exempt
- JR = Junior Accelerator Programme entrant
- CO = College Accelerator Programme entrant
- NG = Next Gen Accelerator Program entrant
- w/o = Walkover
- r = Retired
- d = Defaulted

=== Draw ===
First round
1	(France) D Parry (Ukraine) V Strakhova	6	6
(Italy) N Fossa Huergo (Bolivia) N Zeballos	3	4
(Georgia (country)) E Gorgodze (Greece) V Grammatikopoulou	6	6
(Italy) S Errani (Netherlands) E Vedder	4	4
4	(United Kingdom) F Christie (Colombia) Y Lizarazo	3	3
(France) E Lechemia (Mexico) R Zarazúa	6	6
(Argentina) G Naya (Argentina) J Riera	2	2
(Argentina) ML Carlé (Greece) D Papamichail	6	6
(Colombia) MP Pérez García (United States) S Sewing	7^{7}	7^{7}
(United States) J Loeb (United States) A Rogers	6^{5}	6^{4}
(United States) A Kulikov (United States) R Montgomery	6	2	[6]
3	(Germany) J Lohoff (Switzerland) C Perrin	1	6	[10]
WC	(Argentina) M Capurro Taborda (Argentina) J Estable	6	4	[6]
(Brazil) C Alves (Argentina) S Sierra	4	6	[10]
(France) S Janicijevic (Spain) L Romero Gormaz	1	6	[10]
2	A Anshba (United States) Q Gleason	6	2	[5]

Quarterfinals
1	(France) D Parry (Ukraine) V Strakhova	7^{7}	3	[10]
(Georgia (country)) E Gorgodze (Greece) V Grammatikopoulou	6^{5}	6	[7]
(France) E Lechemia (Mexico) R Zarazúa	6	2	[6]
(Argentina) ML Carlé (Greece) D Papamichail	4	6	[10]
(Colombia) MP Pérez García (United States) S Sewing	6	7^{7}
3	(Germany) J Lohoff (Switzerland) C Perrin	1	6^{5}
(Brazil) C Alves (Argentina) S Sierra	1	4
(France) S Janicijevic (Spain) L Romero Gormaz	6	6

Semifinals
1	(France) D Parry (Ukraine) V Strakhova	2	2
(Argentina) ML Carlé (Greece) D Papamichail	6	6
(Colombia) MP Pérez García (United States) S Sewing	6	6
(France) S Janicijevic (Spain) L Romero Gormaz	3	4

Final
(Argentina) ML Carlé (Greece) D Papamichail	6	4	[11]
(Colombia) MP Pérez García (United States) S Sewing	3	6	[9]
