= Katarzyna Kawa =

Polish tennis player (born 1992)

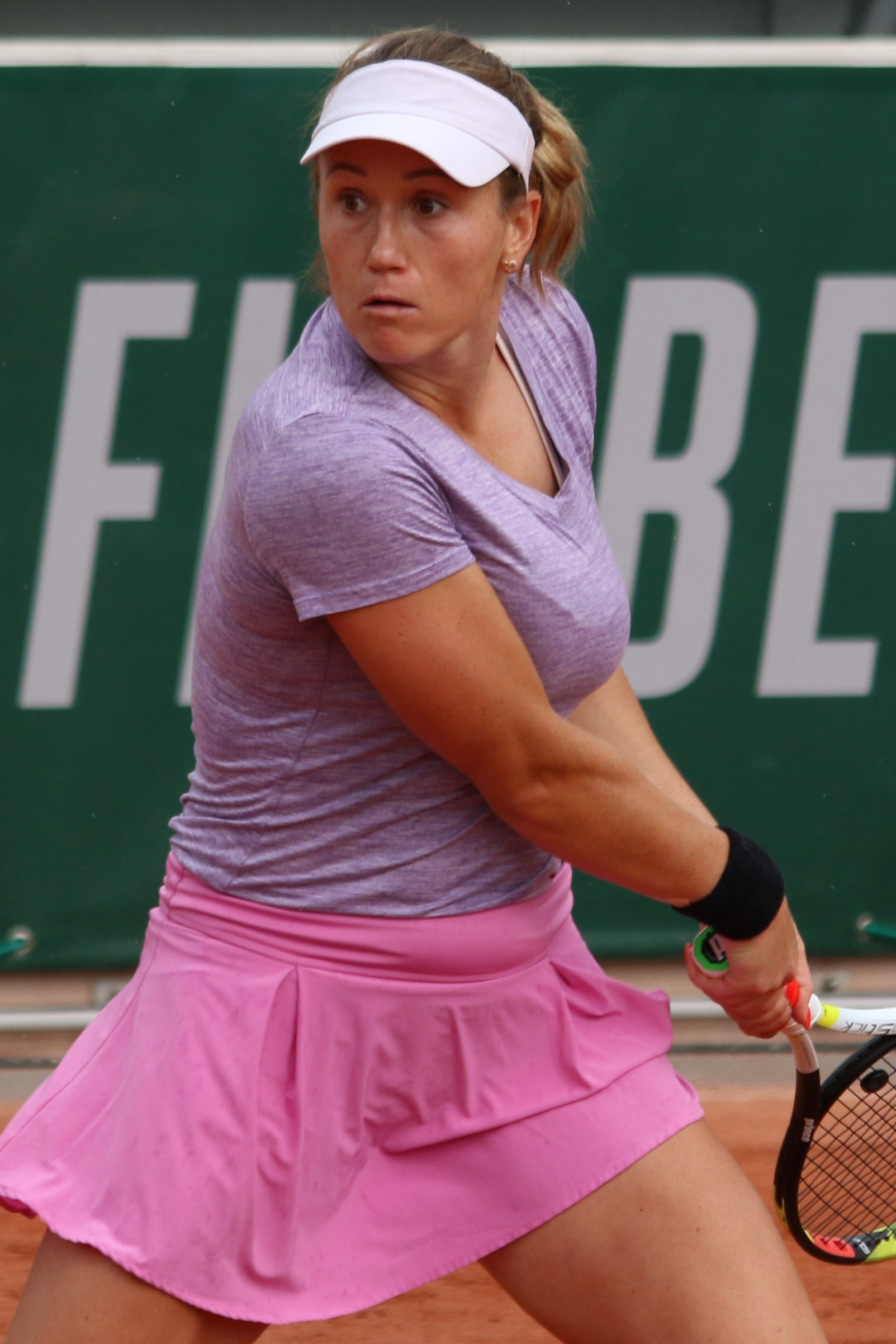
- Kawa at the 2022 French Open
- Country (sports): Poland
- Residence: Poznań, Poland
- Born: 17 November 1992 (age 33) Krynica-Zdrój, Poland
- Height: 1.76 m (5 ft 9 in)
- Turned pro: 2008
- Plays: Right (two-handed backhand)
- Prize money: $1,642,128

Singles
- Career record: 471–373
- Career titles: 2 WTA Challengers
- Highest ranking: No. 106 (26 October 2026)
- Current ranking: No. 118 (9 November 2026)

Grand Slam singles results
- Australian Open: Q2 (2024)
- French Open: Q2 (2024, 2025, 2026)
- Wimbledon: 2R (2022)
- US Open: 1R (2020)

Doubles
- Career record: 228–148
- Career titles: 5 WTA Challengers
- Highest ranking: No. 64 (10 October 2022)

Grand Slam doubles results
- Australian Open: 2R (2024)
- French Open: 2R (2024)
- Wimbledon: 1R (2022, 2024)
- US Open: 1R (2022)

Team competitions
- Fed Cup: 7–8
- Last updated on: 10 November 2026.

Katarzyna Kawa (Polish pronunciation: [kataˈʐɨna ˈkava]; born 17 November 1992) is a Polish professional tennis player. Her career-high WTA rankings are No. 64 in doubles, set on 10 October 2022, and No. 106 in singles, achieved on 26 October 2026. She has won two singles titles and five doubles titles on WTA 125 tournaments. Additionaly, she has won seven singles and 21 doubles titles on the ITF Women's Circuit.

== Personal ==
Katarzyna Kawa was born in Krynica-Zdrój to parents Anna and Jacek, but moved in 2013 to Poznań, Poland, where she currently resides. She started playing tennis at age seven and is coached by Grzegorz Garczyński. She has two sisters, Monika and Weronika, and a brother called Radomir. Her hobbies include reading and traveling. She idolizes Justine Henin and Novak Djokovic. Her favourite shot is her backhand and her favourite surfaces to compete on are both clay and grass.

== Career ==
=== 2019: Baltic Open singles final ===
In July, Kawa made it through the qualifying rounds at the Baltic Open in Jūrmala, Latvia, to book her spot in the final with a straight-sets victory over Bernarda Pera. Kawa reached the semifinals, after defeating Anna Danilina, Naiktha Bains, Ysaline Bonaventure, Jana Fett, Chloe Paquet. In the final, she lost to the top seed Anastasija Sevastova, in three sets.

=== 2020–21: Major debut, top 125 ===
In 2020, Kawa made her singles major debut at the US Open as a direct entry, but lost to 27th seed Ons Jabeur in the first round.

At the 2021 National Tennis Championships in Bytom, Kawa ended runner-up in singles and won the title in doubles alongside Weronika Falkowska. She continued at the Poland Open in Gdynia where she upset third seed Irina-Camelia Begu in the second round, but lost in the quarterfinal against Kateryna Kozlova.

=== 2022: Wimbledon singles debut, Warsaw doubles final ===
Kawa qualified to make her debut at Wimbledon and defeated Rebecca Marino, before losing to third seed Ons Jabeur in the second round. At the Poland Open held in Warsaw, she reached her first WTA Tour doubles final partnering with Alicja Rosolska, losing to fourth seeds Anna Danilina and Anna-Lena Friedsam.

=== 2023: Three WTA 125 doubles titles ===
Alongside Weronika Falkowska, Kawa took the doubles title at the 2023 WTA 125 Copa Oster, overcoming Kyōka Okamura and You Xiaodi in the final which went to a deciding champions tiebreak.

Playing with Elixane Lechemia, she was doubles champion at the WTA 125 Polish Open, thanks to a win over Naiktha Bains and Maia Lumsden in the final.

Partnering with Anna Sisková, Kawa won the doubles title at the WTA 125 Open delle Puglie in Bari, defeating Valentini Grammatikopoulou and Elixane Lechemia in the final.

=== 2024: WTA doubles final, BJK Cup semifinal ===
Partnering Aliona Bolsova, Kawa was again runner-up in the doubles at the Țiriac Foundation Trophy, losing to Carole Monnet and Darja Semeņistaja in the final.

She reached the semifinals of the BJK Cup partnering compatriot and world No. 2, Iga Świątek.

At the WTA 125 Argentina Open in November, Kawa was the runner-up in the singles, losing to fourth seed Mayar Sherif in the final, and won the doubles title alongside Maja Chwalińska with a win over Sherif and Laura Pigossi in the championship match.

=== 2025: WTA Tour singles final ===
At the 2025 Copa Colsanitas, Kawa qualified for the main draw and reached her third WTA Tour quarterfinal and first since 2021 with a win over Laura Pigossi, after saving a match point. Next, she upset top seed Marie Bouzková to reach her second semifinal and first since 2019 Jūrmala. Kawa reached the final defeating fellow qualifier Julieta Pareja but lost to top seed and defending champion, Camila Osorio. As a result, she returned to world No. 156 on 7 April 2025.

=== 2026: United Cup champion, WTA 125 titles ===
In January, Kawa was part of the Polish team that defeated Switzerland in the final of the United Cup. She won her first WTA 125 singles title at the Huzhou Open in May, defeating defending champion Veronika Erjavec in the final. The following month, at the Memorial Eugenio Fontana, Kawa won her second WTA 125 singles title, defeating Lucia Bronzetti in the final.

In October, at the Ningbo Open, she qualified for the main draw, defeated Daria Snigur, fifth seed Belinda Bencic for her first win over a top 20 ranked opponent, and made it through to her maiden WTA 500 quarterfinal, but lost to world No. 1, Elena Rybakina, in three sets. As a result, she reached a new career-high singles ranking of No. 106, on 26 October 2026.

== Grand Slam performance timelines ==
Key
W	F	SF	QF	#R	RR	Q#	P#	DNQ	A	Z#	PO	G	S	B	NMS	NTI	P	NH

(W) winner; (F) finalist; (SF) semifinalist; (QF) quarterfinalist; (#R) rounds 4, 3, 2, 1; (RR) round-robin stage; (Q#) qualification round; (P#) preliminary round; (DNQ) did not qualify; (A) absent; (Z#) Davis/Fed Cup Zonal Group (with number indication) or (PO) play-off; (G) gold, (S) silver or (B) bronze Olympic/Paralympic medal; (NMS) not a Masters tournament; (NTI) not a Tier I tournament; (P) postponed; (NH) not held; (SR) strike rate (events won / competed); (W–L) win–loss record.
To avoid confusion and double counting, these charts are updated at the conclusion of a tournament or when the player's participation has ended.

=== Singles ===
Tournament	2019	2020	2021	2022	2023	2024	2025	2026	W–L
Australian Open	A	Q1	Q1	Q1	A	Q2	A	Q1	0–0
French Open	Q1	A	Q1	Q1	Q1	Q2	Q2	Q2	0–0
Wimbledon	Q3	NH	Q2	2R	A	Q1	Q3	Q3	1–1
US Open	Q1	1R	Q1	Q1	A	Q1	Q1	Q1	0–1
Win–Loss	0–0	0–1	0–0	1–1	0–0	0–0	0–0	0–0	1–2
Year-end ranking	124	113	154	261	207	258	124	118	

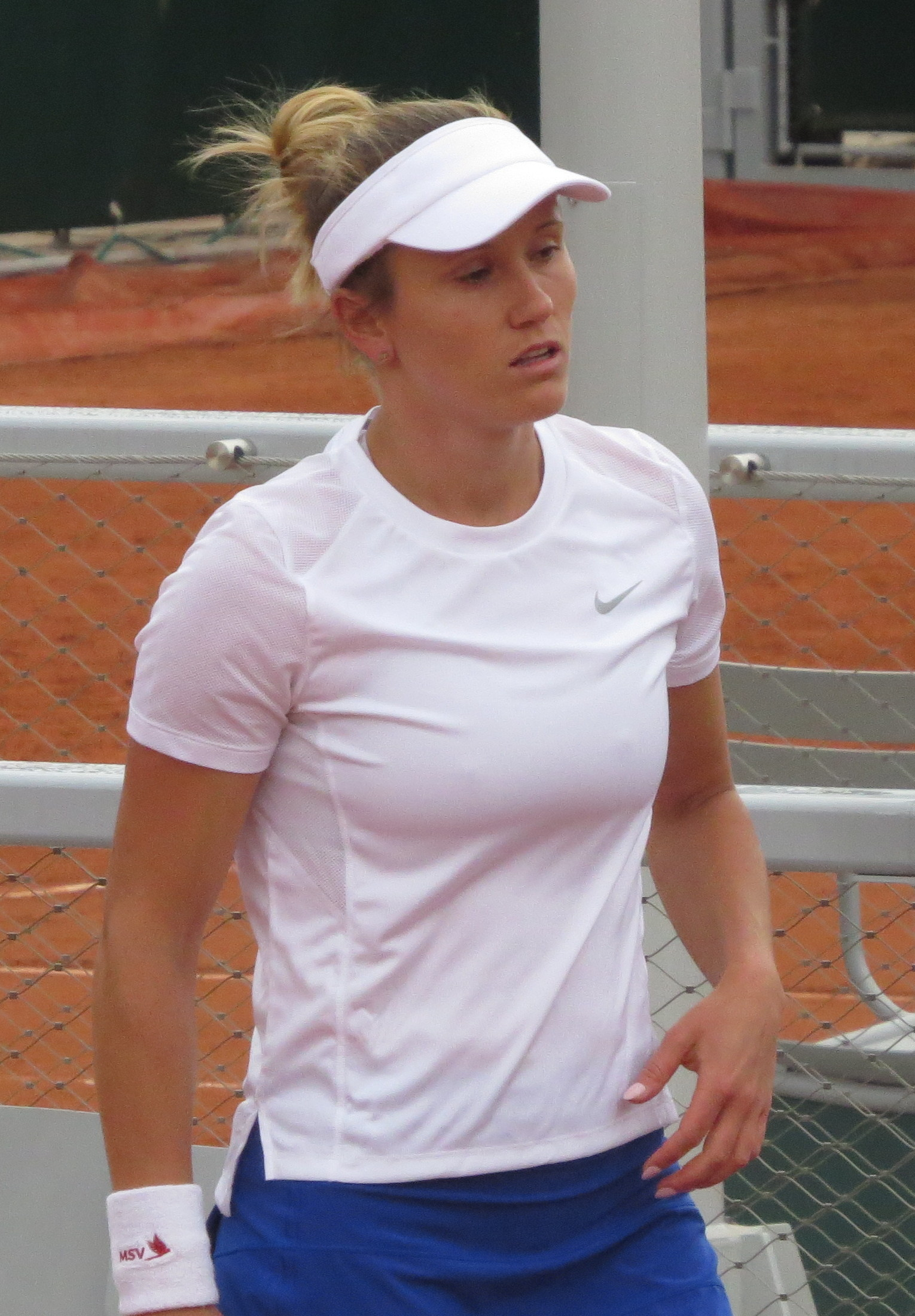
Kawa playing at Roland Garros, 2019

=== Doubles ===
Tournament	2022	2023	2024	2025	W–L
Australian Open	A	A	3R	1R	2–2
French Open	2R	A	3R	A	3–2
Wimbledon	2R	A	2R	A	2–2
US Open	2R	A	A	A	1–1
Win–Loss	3–3	0–0	5–3	0–1	8–7
Year-end ranking	75	118	93	289	

== WTA Tour finals ==
=== Singles: 2 (runner-ups) ===
Legend WTA 250 (0–2)	Finals by surface Clay (0–2)

Result	W–L	Date	Tournament	Tier	Surface	Opponent	Score
Loss	0–1	Jul 2019	Baltic Open, Latvia	International (Note: The WTA International tournaments were reclassified as WTA 250 tournaments in 2021.)	Clay	(Latvia) Anastasija Sevastova	6–3, 5–7, 4–6
Loss	0–2	Apr 2025	Copa Colsanitas, Colombia	WTA 250	Clay	(Colombia) Camila Osorio	3–6, 3–6

=== Doubles: 2 (runner-ups) ===
Legend WTA 500 WTA 250 (0–2)	Finals by surface Hard (0–1) Clay (0–1)

Result	W–L	Date	Tournament	Tier	Surface	Partner	Opponents	Score
Loss	0–1	Jul 2022	Poland Open, Poland	WTA 250	Clay	(Poland) Alicja Rosolska	(Kazakhstan) Anna Danilina (Germany) Anna-Lena Friedsam	4–6, 7–5, [5–10]
Loss	0–2	Mar 2024	ATX Open, United States	WTA 250	Hard	(Netherlands) Bibiane Schoofs	(Australia) Olivia Gadecki (United Kingdom) Olivia Nicholls	2–6, 4–6

== WTA 125 finals ==
=== Singles: 4 (2 titles, 2 runner-ups) ===
Result	W–L	Date	Tournament	Surface	Opponent	Score
Loss	0–1	Nov 2024	Buenos Aires Open, Argentina	Clay	(Egypt) Mayar Sherif	3–6, 6–4, 4–6
Loss	0–2	Jul 2025	Båstad Open, Sweden	Clay	(Italy) Elisabetta Cocciaretto	3–6, 4–6
Win	1–2	May 2026	Huzhou Open, China	Clay	(Slovenia) Veronika Erjavec	6–0, 6–4
Win	2–2	Jun 2026	Modena Open, Italy	Clay	(Italy) Lucia Bronzetti	6–1, 4–6, 7–6^{(6)}

=== Doubles: 8 (5 titles, 3 runner-ups) ===
Result	W–L	Date	Tournament	Surface	Partner	Opponents	Score
Win	1–0	Jun 2021	Bol Open, Croatia	Clay	(Spain) Aliona Bolsova	(Georgia (country)) Ekaterine Gorgodze (Slovakia) Tereza Mihalíková	6–1, 4–6, [10–6]
Loss	1–1	Apr 2022	Marbella Open, Spain	Clay	(Germany) Vivian Heisen	(Romania) Irina Bara (Georgia (country)) Ekaterine Gorgodze	4–6, 6–3, [6–10]
Win	2–1	Feb 2023	Cali Open, Colombia	Clay	(Poland) Weronika Falkowska	(Japan) Kyōka Okamura (China) You Xiaodi	6–1, 5–7, [10–6]
Win	3–1	Aug 2023	Grodzisk Mazowiecki Open, Poland	Hard	(France) Elixane Lechemia	(United Kingdom) Naiktha Bains (United Kingdom) Maia Lumsden	6–3, 6–4
Win	4–1	Sep 2023	Bari Open, Italy	Clay	(Czech Republic) Anna Sisková	(Greece) Valentini Grammatikopoulou (France) Elixane Lechemia	6–1, 6–2
Loss	4–2	Sep 2024	Țiriac Foundation Trophy, Romania	Clay	(Spain) Aliona Bolsova	(France) Carole Monnet (Latvia) Darja Semeņistaja	6–1, 2–6, [7–10]
Win	5–2	Nov 2024	Buenos Aires Open, Argentina	Clay	(Poland) Maja Chwalińska	(Brazil) Laura Pigossi (Egypt) Mayar Sherif	6–4, 3–6, [10–7]
Loss	5–3	Oct 2025	Suzhou Ladies Open, China	Hard	(Japan) Makoto Ninomiya	(Indonesia) Aldila Sutjiadi (Indonesia) Janice Tjen	4–6, 3–6

== ITF Circuit finals ==
=== Singles: 16 (7 titles, 9 runner-ups) ===
Legend $100,000 tournaments (0–2) $60,000 tournaments $25,000 tournaments (4–3) $10/15,000 tournaments (3–4)	Finals by surface Hard (1–0) Clay (5–8) Grass (1–0) Carpet (0–1)

Result	W–L	Date	Tournament	Tier	Surface	Opponent	Score
Loss	0–1	May 2009	ITF Warsaw, Poland	10,000	Clay	(Czech Republic) Iveta Gerlová	3–6, 5–7
Loss	0–2	Feb 2010	ITF Mallorca, Spain	10,000	Clay	(Spain) Garbiñe Muguruza	6–3, 2–6, 0–6
Loss	0–3	Aug 2010	ITF Iława, Poland	10,000	Clay	(Slovakia) Zuzana Zlochová	6–7^{(2)}, 7–5, 2–6
Loss	0–4	May 2012	ITF Warsaw, Poland	10,000	Clay	(Slovakia) Chantal Škamlová	3–6, 2–6
Win	1–4	Aug 2012	ITF Prague, Czech Republic	25,000	Clay	(Czech Republic) Renata Voráčová	6–4, 6–1
Loss	1–5	April 2013	Chiasso Open, Switzerland	25,000	Clay	(Belgium) Alison Van Uytvanck	6–7^{(2)}, 3–6
Win	2–5	Mar 2015	ITF São José do Rio Preto, Brazil	10,000	Clay	(Argentina) Nadia Podoroska	7–5, 3–6, 6–4
Win	3–5	Apr 2015	ITF Cairo, Egypt	15,000	Clay	(United Kingdom) Amanda Carreras	7–5, 6–1
Win	4–5	Oct 2015	ITF Makinohara, Japan	25,000	Grass	(Japan) Riko Sawayanagi	6–7^{(6)}, 6–2, 7–6^{(6)}
Win	5–5	Jan 2018	ITF Sharm El Sheikh, Egypt	15,000	Hard	(China) Zhang Kailin	6–2, 4–6, 6–2
Win	6–5	Jun 2018	ITF Óbidos, Portugal	25,000	Clay	(Serbia) Dejana Radanović	4–6, 7–5, 6–3
Loss	6–6	Oct 2018	ITF Óbidos, Portugal	25,000	Carpet	(Czech Republic) Tereza Martincová	6–7^{(3)}, 3–6
Win	7–6	Apr 2019	ITF Jackson, United States	W25	Clay	(United States) Ann Li	6–3, 6–2
Loss	7–7	Nov 2020	ITF Charleston Pro, United States	W100	Clay	(Egypt) Mayar Sherif	2–6, 3–6
Loss	7–8	May 2022	Bonita Springs Championship, United States	W100	Clay	(Romania) Gabriela Lee	1–6, 3–6
Loss	7–9	Jul 2023	ITF Tarvisio, Italy	W25	Clay	(Croatia) Petra Marčinko	1–6, 6–4, 2–6

=== Doubles: 35 (21 titles, 14 runner-ups) ===
Legend $100,000 tournaments (3–2) $80,000 tournaments (2–2) $50/60,000 tournaments (4–1) $25,000 tournaments (5–4) $10/15,000 tournaments (7–5)	Finals by surface Hard (7–6) Clay (13–8) Carpet (1–0)

Result	W–L	Date	Tournament	Tier	Surface	Partner	Opponents	Score
Loss	0–1	May 2009	ITF Warsaw, Poland	10,000	Clay	(Poland) Katarzyna Kaleta	(Czech Republic) Iveta Gerlová (Poland) Karolina Kosińska	2–6, 1–6
Loss	0–2	Jul 2009	Palić Open, Serbia	10,000	Clay	(Slovakia) Simona Parajová	(Hungary) Dunja Antunovic (Croatia) Ani Mijacika	4–6, 0–6
Win	1–2	Aug 2009	ITF Iława, Poland	10,000	Clay	(Poland) Aleksandra Rosolska	(Poland) Veronika Domagała (Poland) Anna Niemiec	6–1, 6–3
Loss	1–3	Aug 2010	ITF Iława, Poland	10,000	Clay	(Poland) Veronika Domagała	(Czech Republic) Martina Borecká (Czech Republic) Martina Kubičíková	3–6, 1–6
Win	2–3	Aug 2010	ITF Gliwice, Poland	10,000	Clay	(Poland) Justyna Jegiołka	(Poland) Olga Brózda (Poland) Veronika Domagała	6–2, 7–6^{(4)}
Win	3–3	Oct 2010	ITF Bol, Croatia	10,000	Clay	(Poland) Natalia Kołat	(Slovenia) Anja Prislan (Netherlands) Eva Wacanno	5–7, 6–4, [10–8]
Loss	3–4	Mar 2011	ITF Antalya, Turkey	10,000	Clay	(Croatia) Darija Jurak	(China) Liang Chen (China) Tian Ran	6–4, 2–6, [6–10]
Win	4–4	Jul 2011	ITF Horb, Germany	10,000	Clay	(Poland) Paula Kania	(Hungary) Vaszilisza Bulgakova (Germany) Christina Shakovets	1–6, 6–3, [10–2]
Win	5–4	Jan 2013	ITF Sharm El Sheikh, Egypt	10,000	Hard	(Poland) Natalia Kołat	(Bulgaria) Aleksandrina Naydenova (Russia) Ekaterina Yashina	6–1, 6–4
Win	6–4	Aug 2013	Trofeul Popeci, Romania	50,000	Clay	(Italy) Alice Balducci	(Romania) Diana Buzean (Germany) Christina Shakovets	3–6, 7–6^{(3)}, [10–8]
Loss	6–5	Jan 2016	ITF Bertioga, Brazil	25,000	Hard	(Poland) Sandra Zaniewska	(Romania) Cristina Dinu (Netherlands) Indy de Vroome	3–6, 3–6
Loss	6–6	Apr 2016	Chiasso Open, Switzerland	25,000	Clay	(Poland) Olga Brózda	(Germany) Antonia Lottner (Germany) Anne Schäfer	1–6, 1–6
Loss	6–7	Jun 2016	ITF Puszczykowo, Poland	10,000	Hard	(Poland) Olga Brózda	(Poland) Weronika Foryś (Russia) Valeria Savinykh	6–7^{(4)}, 4–6
Win	7–7	Aug 2016	ITF Plzeň, Czech Republic	25,000	Clay	(Sweden) Cornelia Lister	(Bosnia and Herzegovina) Ema Burgić Bucko (Spain) Georgina García Pérez	6–1, 7–6^{(6)}
Win	8–7	Sep 2016	ITF Hua Hin, Thailand	25,000	Hard	(Brazil) Laura Pigossi	(Thailand) Kamonwan Buayam (Chinese Taipei) Lee Pei-chi	7–5, 6–7^{(4)}, [10–6]
Loss	8–8	Oct 2016	ITF Cairns, Australia	25,000	Hard	(Poland) Sandra Zaniewska	(Australia) Alison Bai (Australia) Lizette Cabrera	5–7, 7–5, [10–12]
Win	9–8	May 2017	ITF La Marsa, Tunisia	25,000	Clay	(Bosnia and Herzegovina) Jasmina Tinjić	(Bosnia and Herzegovina) Dea Herdželaš (Croatia) Tereza Mrdeža	7–5, 6–4
Loss	9–9	Jun 2017	Warsaw Open, Poland	25,000	Clay	(Poland) Katarzyna Piter	(Australia) Priscilla Hon (Belarus) Vera Lapko	6–7^{(3)}, 4–6
Win	10–9	Feb 2018	ITF Sharm El Sheikh, Egypt	15,000	Hard	(United Kingdom) Emily Webley-Smith	(Romania) Laura-Ioana Andrei (Belgium) Hélène Scholsen	6–3, 3–6, [10–5]
Win	11–9	Mar 2018	ITF Solarino, Italy	15,000	Carpet	(Belarus) Shalimar Talbi	(Australia) Laura Ashley (United States) Quinn Gleason	6–3, 6–4
Win	12–9	Jun 2018	Bella Cup Torun, Poland	25,000	Clay	(Poland) Maja Chwalińska	(Uzbekistan) Albina Khabibulina (Belgium) Hélène Scholsen	6–1, 6–4
Win	13–9	Apr 2019	ITF Jackson, United States	W25	Clay	(Poland) Katarzyna Piter	(United States) Hanna Chang (United States) Caitlin Whoriskey	7–5, 6–1
Loss	13–10	Apr 2019	Charlottesville Open, United States	W80	Clay	(Czech Republic) Lucie Hradecká	(United States) Asia Muhammad (United States) Taylor Townsend	6–4, 5–7, [3–10]
Win	14–10	Oct 2020	Tennis Classic of Macon, United States	W80	Hard	(Poland) Magdalena Fręch	(United States) Francesca Di Lorenzo (United States) Jamie Loeb	7–5, 6–1
Win	15–10	Nov 2020	ITF Charleston Pro, United States	W100	Clay	(Poland) Magdalena Fręch	(Australia) Astra Sharma (Egypt) Mayar Sherif	4–6, 6–4, [10–2]
Win	16–10	Apr 2021	Zagreb Ladies Open, Croatia	W60	Clay	(Austria) Barbara Haas	(Romania) Andreea Prisăcariu (Slovenia) Nika Radišić	7–6^{(1)}, 5–7, [10–6]
Win	17–10	Oct 2021	Rancho Santa Fe Open, United States	W60	Hard	(Slovakia) Tereza Mihalíková	(Chinese Taipei) Liang En-shuo (Canada) Rebecca Marino	6–3, 4–6, [10–6]
Loss	17–11	Oct 2021	Tyler Pro Challenge, United States	W80	Hard	(Japan) Misaki Doi	(Mexico) Giuliana Olmos (Mexico) Marcela Zacarías	5–7, 6–1, [5–10]
Win	18–11	May 2022	ITF Charleston Pro, United States (2)	W100	Clay	(Indonesia) Aldila Sutjiadi	(United States) Sophie Chang (United States) Angela Kulikov	6–1, 6–4
Loss	18–12	May 2022	Bonita Springs Championship, US	W100	Clay	(Russia) Olga Govortsova	(Hungary) Tímea Babos (Japan) Nao Hibino	4–6, 6–3, [7–10]
Loss	18–13	Aug 2022	Grodzisk Mazowiecki Open, Poland	W100	Hard	(Germany) Vivian Heisen	(United Kingdom) Alicia Barnett (United Kingdom) Olivia Nicholls	1–6, 6–7^{(3)}
Loss	18–14	Oct 2022	ITF Templeton Pro, US	W60	Hard	(United States) Sophie Chang	(Japan) Nao Hibino (United States) Sabrina Santamaria	4–6, 6–7^{(4)}
Win	19–14	Oct 2022	Rancho Santa Fe Open, United States	W80	Hard	(United States) Elvina Kalieva	(Mexico) Giuliana Olmos (Mexico) Marcela Zacarías	6–1, 3–6, [10–2]
Win	20–14	Jun 2023	Open de Biarritz, France	W60	Clay	(Poland) Weronika Falkowska	(Switzerland) Conny Perrin (Czech Republic) Anna Sisková	7–6^{(2)}, 7–5
Win	21–14	Oct 2024	Tennis Classic of Macon, United States (2)	W100	Hard	(United States) Sophie Chang	(Brazil) Ingrid Martins (United States) Quinn Gleason	7–5, 6–4
