= WTA Argentine Open =

Tennis tournament at Buenos Aires, Argentina

WTA 125
- Event name: IEB+ Argentina Open
- Tour: WTA 125 (2021–)
- Founded: 1928
- Surface: Clay
- Prize money: $115,000 (2025)
- Website: https://wta.iebmasargentinaopen.com/

Current champions (2025)
- Singles: (Hungary) Panna Udvardy
- Doubles: (Spain) Alicia Herrero Liñana (Brazil) Laura Pigossi

The WTA IEB+ Argentina Open is a WTA professional tennis tournament originally founded as a combined men's and women's tournament called the Argentina International Championships. It was initially played from 1928 to 1987 and returned in 2021 as a WTA 125-level tournament on the WTA Tour calendar. It was the first professional women's tennis event in Argentina since 1987. It is held at the Buenos Aires Lawn Tennis Club in November and played on outdoor clay courts.

This event is not to be confused with the earlier Argentine Championship (1918–1997), which was the open national championships of Argentina held at the Tennis Club Argentino (founded 1913) also in Buenos Aires.

== Finals ==
=== Singles ===
Year	Champion	Runner-up	Score
1928	(Argentina) Analia Obarrio de Aguirre	(Argentina) Maria Elena Bushell	6-0, 6-1
1929	(Argentina) Analia Obarrio de Aguirre (2)	(Argentina) Maria Elena Bushell	6-4, 6-1
1930	(Spain) Lili de Alvarez	(United Kingdom) Phoebe Holcroft Watson	6-2, 6-2
1931	(Germany) Cilly Aussem	(Germany) Irmgard Rost	6-1, 6-4
1932	(Chile) Anita Lizana	(Argentina) Julieta Ezcurra Dellepiane	6-3, 6-3
1933	(Argentina) Maria Elena Bushell de Moss	(Argentina) Monica Ricketts	6-2, 6-8, 6-3
1934	(Argentina) Monica Ricketts	(Spain) Maria Garcia de Sola	2-6, 6-1, 6-3
1935	(Argentina) Monica Ricketts (2)	(Argentina) Ana Pauwels de Madrid	6-0, 6-3
1936	(Argentina) Leonilda Giusti	(Argentina) Maria Elena Bushell de Moss	6-2, 6-4
1937	(Argentina) Maria Elena Bushell de Moss (2)	(Argentina) Denise Rutherford de Zappa	6-2, 4-6, 6-3
1938	(Argentina) Felisa Piédrola	(Argentina) Denise Rutherford de Zappa	6-4, 7-5
1939	(Argentina) Felisa Piédrola (2)	(Argentina) Maria Terán	4-6, 7-5, 4-0 ret.
1940	(United States) Dorothy Bundy	(United States) Sarah Palfrey Cooke	6-1, 4-6, 6-3
1941	(United States) Sarah Palfrey Cooke	(United States) Dorothy Bundy	3-6, 9-7, 7-5
1942	(Argentina) Felisa Piédrola (3)	(Argentina) Maria Terán	8-6, 6-2
1943	(Argentina) Felisa Piédrola (4)	(Argentina) Mary Terán de Weiss	6-4, 6-3
1944	(Argentina) Felisa Piédrola (5)	(Argentina) Mary Terán de Weiss	3-6, 13-11, 6-1
1945	women's event not held		
1946	(United States) Margaret Osborne	(United States) Louise Brough	5-7, 6-4, 6-4
1947	(United States) Pat Canning Todd	(United States) Doris Hart	6-3, 6-4
1948	(United States) Pat Canning Todd (2)	(Argentina) Mary Terán de Weiss	7-5, 6-4
1949	(United States) Barbara Scofield	(United States) Nancy Chaffee	6-3, 6-2
1950	(Argentina) Felisa Piédrola de Zappa (6)	(Argentina) Elena Lehmann	6-4, 3-6, 6-3
1951	(Argentina) Elena Lehmann	(Argentina) Felisa Piédrola de Zappa	6-4, 3-6, 6-4
1952	women's event not held		
1953	(West Germany) Edda Buding	(Argentina) Julia Borzone	7-5, 6-3
1954	(Italy) Silvana Lazzarino	(West Germany) Edda Buding	8-6, 6-2
1955	(Brazil) Ingrid Metzner	(Argentina) June Hanson	6-1, 6-4
1956	(Argentina) Nora Bonifacino de Somoza	(Argentina) June Hanson	6-4, 6-0
1957	(Argentina) June Hanson	(Argentina) Nora Bonifacino de Somoza	6-1, 6-1
1958	(United Kingdom) Shirley Bloomer	(Australia) Margaret Hellyer	2-6, 6-2, 12-10
1959	(Argentina) Nora Bonifacino de Somoza (2)	(Argentina) Norma Baylon	6-3, 5-7, divided
1960	(Argentina) Nora Bonifacino de Somoza (3)	(Argentina) Mabel Bove	7-5, 6-4
1961	(Mexico) Yola Ramírez	(United States) Darlene Hard	6-1, 6-2
1962	(Argentina) Norma Baylon	(Czechoslovakia) Vera Puzejova Sukova	5-7, 6-4, 6-3
1963	(Czechoslovakia) Vera Puzejova Sukova	(Argentina) Norma Baylon	6-2, 6-4
1964	(United States) Nancy Richey	(Brazil) Maria Bueno	4-6, 6-2, 6-4
1965	(United States) Nancy Richey (2)	(Argentina) Norma Baylon	6-2, 6-4
1966	(Argentina) Norma Baylon (3)	(United States) Nancy Richey	6-3, 7-9, 6-4
1967	(United States) Billie Jean Moffitt King	(United States) Rosie Casals	6-3, 3-6, 6-2
Open era
1968	(United Kingdom) Ann Haydon Jones	(United States) Nancy Richey	walkover
1969	(West Germany) Helga Niessen	(United States) Rosie Casals	1-6, 6-4, 6-2
1970	(Argentina) Beatriz Araujo	(Argentina) Raquel Giscafré	6-4, 6-4
1971	(West Germany) Helga Niessen Masthoff (2)	(West Germany) Heide Orth	6-1, 7-5
1972	(United Kingdom) Virginia Wade	(Uruguay) Fiorella Bonicelli	6-4, 6-1
1973	(United States) Julie Heldman	(Uruguay) Fiorella Bonicelli	6-3, 6-1
1974	(Argentina) Raquel Giscafré	(Argentina) Beatriz Araujo	7-6, 1-6, 6-2
1975	(Argentina) Raquel Giscafré (2)	(United States) Kristien Shaw	6-2, 6-4
1976	(United States) Laura duPont	(Argentina) Beatriz Araujo	6-1, 6-2
1977	(Brazil) Patricia Medrado	(Argentina) Ivanna Madruga	6-1, 3-6, 6-4
1978	women's event not held		
1979	(Argentina) Ivanna Madruga	(Czechoslovakia) Hana Strachonova	6-1, 6-3
1980	(Argentina) Ivanna Madruga (2)	(Argentina) Liliana Giussani	6-3, 2-6, 6-2
1981	women's event not held		
1982	(Argentina) Liliana Giussani	(Argentina) Andrea Tiezzi	6-1, 7-5
1983	(Argentina) Ivanna Madruga (3)	(Argentina) Viviana Gonzalez-Locicero	6-4, 6-3
1984	(Argentina) Gabriela Sabatini	(Peru) Laura Arraya	6-0, 6-3
1985	women's event not held		
1986	(Argentina) Gabriela Sabatini (2)	(Spain) Arantxa Sánchez Vicario	6-1, 6-1
1987	(Argentina) Gabriela Sabatini (3)	(West Germany) Isabel Cueto	6-0, 6-3
1988–2020	not held		
↓ WTA 125 tournament ↓
2021	(Hungary) Anna Bondár	(France) Diane Parry	6–3, 6–3
2022	(Hungary) Panna Udvardy	(Montenegro) Danka Kovinić	6–4, 6–1
2023	(Brazil) Laura Pigossi	(Argentina) María Lourdes Carlé	6–3, 6–2
2024	(Egypt) Mayar Sherif	(Poland) Katarzyna Kawa	6–3, 4–6, 6–4
2025	(Hungary) Panna Udvardy (2)	(United States) Varvara Lepchenko	6–3, 7–5

=== Doubles ===
Year	Champions	Runners-up	Score
1930	(United Kingdom) Phoebe Holcroft Watson (United Kingdom) Ermyntrude Harvey	(Spain) Lilí de Álvarez; Miss Anderson	6–3, 3–6, 6–2
1968	(United States) Rosemary Casals (United Kingdom) Ann Jones	(United States) Julie Heldman (Argentina) Mabel Vrancovich	6–1, 6–2
1971	(Soviet Union) Olga Morozova (Netherlands) Betty Stöve	(Argentina) Beatriz Araujo (Argentina) Ines Roget	7–5, 6–1
1972	(Germany) Helga Masthoff (United States) Pam Teeguarden	(Chile) Ana María Arias (United Kingdom) Virginia Wade	7–5, 6–2
1974	(Germany) Katja Ebbinghaus (Germany) Helga Masthoff	(Argentina) Beatriz Araujo (Argentina) Raquel Giscafre	6–0, 6–1
1978	(France) Françoise Dürr (United States) Valerie Ziegenfuss	(United States) Laura duPont (Czechoslovakia) Regina Maršíková	1–6, 6–4, 6–3
1986	(United States) Lori McNeil (Argentina) Mercedes Paz	(Netherlands) Manon Bollegraf (Netherlands) Nicole Jagerman	6–1, 2–6, 6–1
1987	(Argentina) Mercedes Paz (Argentina) Gabriela Sabatini	(Canada) Jill Hetherington (Switzerland) Christiane Jolissaint	6–2, 6–2
1988–2020	not held		
↓ WTA 125 tournament ↓
2021	(Romania) Irina Bara (Georgia (country)) Ekaterine Gorgodze	(Argentina) María Lourdes Carlé (Greece) Despina Papamichail	5–7, 7–5, [10–4]
2022	(Romania) Irina Bara (2) (Italy) Sara Errani	(South Korea) Jang Su-jeong (China) You Xiaodi	6–1, 7–5
2023	(Argentina) María Lourdes Carlé (Greece) Despina Papamichail	(Colombia) María Paulina Pérez (United States) Sofia Sewing	6–3, 4–6, [11–9]
2024	(Poland) Maja Chwalińska (Poland) Katarzyna Kawa	(Brazil) Laura Pigossi (Egypt) Mayar Sherif	6–4, 3–6, [10–7]
2025	(Spain) Alicia Herrero Liñana (Brazil) Laura Pigossi	(Argentina) Nicole Fossa Huergo (Czech Republic) Laura Samson	6–2, 7–6^{(7–5)}
