= María Paulina Pérez García =

Colombian tennis player (born 1996)

- Country (sports): Colombia
- Born: 10 January 1996 (age 30) Barranquilla, Colombia
- Height: 1.70 m (5 ft 7 in)
- Plays: Right-handed
- Prize money: $127,709

Singles
- Career record: 171–186
- Career titles: 0
- Highest ranking: No. 619 (12 September 2022)
- Current ranking: No. 1,173 (12 October 2026)

Doubles
- Career record: 268–212
- Career titles: 1 WTA, 15 ITF
- Highest ranking: No. 115 (28 August 2023)
- Current ranking: No. 475 (12 October 2026)

Team competitions
- BJK Cup: 13–15
Medal record
Representing Colombia
Women's tennis
Pan American Games
| Silver medal – second place | 2023 Santiago | Doubles |
Central American and Caribbean Games
| Gold medal – first place | 2026 Santo Domingo | Mixed doubles |
| Silver medal – second place | 2026 Santo Domingo | Nations cup |
Bolivarian Games
| Gold medal – first place | 2022 Valledupar | Doubles |
- Last updated on: 14 October 2026.

María Paulina Pérez García (born 10 January 1996) is a Colombian professional tennis player. On 28 August 2023, she peaked at No. 115 in the WTA doubles rankings. On 12 September 2022, she reached her best singles ranking of world No. 619. Pérez has won one doubles title on the WTA Tour and 15 doubles titles on the ITF Circuit.

Playing for Colombia, Pérez has a win–loss record of 13–15 in Billie Jean King Cup competition (as of September 2024).

== Career ==
Pérez made her WTA Tour debut at the 2013 Copa Colsanitas, partnering her sister Paula Andrea in doubles. The twins lost their first-round match against Alizé Cornet and Pauline Parmentier.

Ranked a then career-high world No. 273 in doubles, she reached her first WTA Tour final at the 2023 Monterrey Open, partnering Yuliana Lizarazo. They won their maiden title, defeating Kimberly Birrell and Fernanda Contreras Gómez. As a result, she moved up 130 positions in the doubles rankings, into the top 150. Partnering Sofia Sewing, she was runner-up in the doubles at the 2023 WTA Argentina Open, losing to María Lourdes Carlé and Despina Papamichail in the final.

== WTA Tour finals ==
=== Doubles: 1 (title) ===
| Legend WTA 250 (1–0) | Finals by surface Hard (1–0) |

| Result | W–L | Date | Tournament | Tier | Surface | Partner | Opponents | Score |
|---|---|---|---|---|---|---|---|---|
| Win | 1–0 | Mar 2023 | Monterrey Open, Mexico | WTA 250 | Hard | (Colombia) Yuliana Lizarazo | (Australia) Kimberly Birrell (Mexico) Fernanda Contreras Gómez | 6–3, 5–7, [10–5] |

== WTA 125 finals ==
=== Doubles: 2 (2 runner-ups) ===
| Result | W–L | Date | Tournament | Surface | Partner | Opponents | Score |
|---|---|---|---|---|---|---|---|
| Loss | 0–1 | Aug 2023 | Barranquilla Open, Colombia | Hard | (Colombia) Yuliana Lizarazo | (Greece) Valentini Grammatikopoulou (Greece) Despina Papamichail | 6–7^{(2–7)}, 5–7 |
| Loss | 0–2 | Dec 2023 | Buenos Aires Open, Argentina | Clay | (United States) Sofia Sewing | (Argentina) María Lourdes Carlé (Greece) Despina Papamichail | 3–6, 6–4, [9–11] |

== ITF Circuit finals ==
=== Singles: 2 (2 runner-ups) ===
| Legend $15,000 tournaments (0–2) | Finals by surface Hard (0–2) |

| Result | W–L | Date | Tournament | Tier | Surface | Opponent | Score |
|---|---|---|---|---|---|---|---|
| Loss | 0–1 | Jun 2019 | ITF Tabarka, Tunisia | 15,000 | Hard | (France) Margaux Rouvroy | 4–6, 3–6 |
| Loss | 0–2 | Nov 2019 | ITF Guatemala City, Guatemala | 15,000 | Hard | (France) Caroline Roméo | 2–6, 6–7^{(5)} |

=== Doubles: 42 (15 titles, 27 runner-ups) ===
| Legend W60/75 tournaments (0–2) W40/50 tournaments (0–3) W25/35 tournaments (3–9) W10/15 tournaments (12–13) | Finals by surface Hard (1–8) Clay (14–19) |

| Result | W–L | Date | Tournament | Tier | Surface | Partner | Opponents | Score |
|---|---|---|---|---|---|---|---|---|
| Loss | 0–1 | Nov 2012 | ITF Barranquilla, Colombia | 10,000 | Clay | (Colombia) Paula Andrea Pérez | (United States) Nadia Echeverría Alam (United States) Blair Shankle | 5–7, 6–7^{(1)} |
| Win | 1–1 | Jun 2013 | ITF Breda, Netherlands | 10,000 | Clay | (Colombia) María Herazo González | (Belgium) Elke Lemmens (Belarus) Sviatlana Pirazhenka | 1–6, 7–6^{(2)}, [12–10] |
| Win | 2–1 | Dec 2013 | ITF Barranquilla, Colombia | 10,000 | Clay | (Colombia) Paula Andrea Pérez | (Chile) Andrea Koch Benvenuto (United States) Daniella Roldan | 6–1, 6–4 |
| Loss | 2–2 | Jun 2014 | ITF Coatzacoalcos, Mexico | 10,000 | Hard | (Colombia) Paula Andrea Pérez | (Mexico) Camila Fuentes (Mexico) Marcela Zacarías | 2–6, 2–6 |
| Win | 3–2 | Aug 2014 | ITF Quito, Ecuador | 10,000 | Clay | (Colombia) Paula Andrea Pérez | (Brazil) Nathaly Kurata (Brazil) Eduarda Piai | 7–5, 7–6^{(5)} |
| Loss | 3–3 | Oct 2014 | ITF Lima, Peru | 10,000 | Clay | (Colombia) Paula Andrea Pérez | (Chile) Fernanda Brito (Brazil) Eduarda Piai | 6–7^{(0)}, 4–6 |
| Loss | 3–4 | Oct 2016 | ITF Pereira, Colombia | 10,000 | Clay | (Colombia) Paula Andrea Pérez | (Chile) Fernanda Brito (Paraguay) Camila Giangreco Campiz | 1–6, 2–6 |
| Loss | 3–5 | Oct 2016 | ITF Cúcuta, Colombia | 10,000 | Clay | (Colombia) Paula Andrea Pérez | (Chile) Bárbara Gatica (Chile) Daniela Macarena López | 4–6, 6–4, [4–10] |
| Win | 4–5 | Jun 2017 | ITF Hammamet, Tunisia | 15,000 | Clay | (Colombia) Paula Andrea Pérez | (Brazil) Nathaly Kurata (Brazil) Eduarda Piai | 6–3, 6–3 |
| Loss | 4–6 | Mar 2018 | ITF Sharm El Sheikh, Egypt | 15,000 | Hard | (Colombia) Paula Andrea Pérez | (Georgia (country)) Mariam Bolkvadze (Czech Republic) Barbora Štefková | 2–6, 6–7^{(6)} |
| Win | 5–6 | Nov 2018 | ITF Cúcuta, Colombia | 15,000 | Clay | (Colombia) Paula Andrea Pérez | (Colombia) Ana Maria Becerra (Colombia) Daniela Carrillo | 6–1, 6–1 |
| Loss | 5–7 | Dec 2018 | ITF Bogota, Egypt | 15,000 | Hard | (Colombia) Paula Andrea Pérez | (United States) Allura Zamarripa (United States) Maribella Zamarripa | 5–7, 4–6 |
| Win | 6–7 | Apr 2019 | ITF Guayaquil, Ecuador | W15 | Clay | (Chile) Fernanda Brito | (United States) Mara Schmidt (Russia) Anastasia Shaulskaya | 6–3, 7–6^{(3)} |
| Win | 7–7 | Apr 2019 | ITF Bucaramanga, Colombia | W15 | Clay | (Chile) Fernanda Brito | (Colombia) Yuliana Lizarazo (Colombia) Antonia Samudio | 6–2, 6–2 |
| Loss | 7–8 | Jun 2019 | ITF Tabarka, Tunisia | W15 | Clay | (Argentina) Julieta Lara Estable | (France) Carla Touly (Italy) Anna Turati | 7–6^{(5)}, 5–7, [8–10] |
| Win | 8–8 | Sep 2019 | ITF Buenos Aires, Argentina | W15 | Clay | (Colombia) Jessica Plazas | (Argentina) Eugenia Ganga (Canada) Raphaëlle Lacasse | 7–6^{(8)}, 6–4 |
| Loss | 8–9 | Apr 2021 | ITF Antalya, Turkiye | W15 | Clay | (Mexico) María Portillo Ramírez | (South Korea) Jang Su-jeong (South Korea) Lee So-ra | 2–6, 6–2, [7–10] |
| Win | 9–9 | Apr 2021 | ITF Antalya, Turkiye | W15 | Clay | (Italy) Federica Rossi | (Russia) Victoria Mikhaylova (Russia) Ekaterina Shalimova | 2–6, 6–4, [10–6] |
| Loss | 9–10 | May 2021 | ITF Monastir, Tunisia | W15 | Hard | (United States) Emma Davis | (United States) Dalayna Hewitt (United States) Chiara Scholl | 4–6, 2–6 |
| Loss | 9–11 | Aug 2021 | ITF Cairo, Egypt | W15 | Clay | (Ecuador) Mell Reasco | (Kazakhstan) Zhibek Kulambayeva (Egypt) Sandra Samir | 5–7, 3–6 |
| Loss | 9–12 | Oct 2021 | ITF Lima, Peru | W25 | Clay | (Colombia) Jessica Plazas | (Argentina) María Lourdes Carlé (Brazil) Laura Pigossi | 1–6, 1–6 |
| Win | 10–12 | Oct 2021 | ITF Guayaquil, Ecuador | W25 | Clay | (Colombia) María Herazo González | (Bosnia and Herzegovina) Dea Herdželaš (Mexico) Victoria Rodríguez | 6–3, 4–6, [10–7] |
| Loss | 10–12 | Dec 2021 | ITF Santo Domingo, Dominican Republic | W15 | Hard | (Colombia) María Herazo González | (United States) Dasha Ivanova (United States) Chanelle Van Nguyen | 4–6, 3–6 |
| Win | 11–12 | Dec 2021 | ITF Santo Domingo, Dominican Republic | W15 | Hard | (Colombia) María Herazo González | (United States) Paris Corley (Slovakia) Ingrid Vojčináková | 7–6^{4}, 3–6, [12–10] |
| Loss | 11–13 | Mar 2022 | ITF Salinas, Ecuador | W25 | Hard | (Colombia) María Herazo González | (Chile) Bárbara Gatica (Brazil) Rebeca Pereira | 4–6, 0–6 |
| Loss | 11–14 | Aug 2022 | ITF Rio de Janeiro, Brazil | W25 | Clay | (India) Riya Bhatia | (Brazil) Thaísa Grana Pedretti (Bolivia) Noelia Zeballos | 3–6, 1–6 |
| Win | 12–14 | Sep 2022 | ITF Guayaquil, Ecuador | W15 | Clay | (United States) Sofia Sewing | (Peru) Romina Ccuno (Colombia) María Herazo González | 6–4, 1–6, [10–2] |
| Loss | 12–15 | Oct 2022 | ITF Guayaquil, Ecuador | W15 | Clay | (United States) Sofia Sewing | (Peru) Romina Ccuno (Colombia) María Herazo González | 2–6, 7–5, [9–11] |
| Loss | 12–16 | Oct 2022 | ITF Bucaramanga, Colombia | W15 | Clay | (Peru) Romina Ccuno | (Netherlands) Lexie Stevens (Ukraine) Valeriya Strakhova | 6–7^{(4)}, 3–6 |
| Win | 13–16 | Oct 2022 | ITF Ibagué, Colombia | W25 | Clay | (Colombia) Yuliana Lizarazo | (Colombia) María Herazo González (United States) Sofia Sewing | 6–4, 7–5 |
| Loss | 13–17 | Jan 2023 | ITF Buenos Aires, Argentina | W25 | Clay | (Colombia) Yuliana Lizarazo | (Russia) Amina Anshba (Ukraine) Valeriya Strakhova | 6–1, 4–6, [7–10] |
| Loss | 13–18 | Feb 2023 | ITF Mexico City, Mexico | W40 | Hard | (Colombia) Yuliana Lizarazo | (Greece) Despina Papamichail (Cyprus) Raluca Șerban | 6–3, 4–6, [4–10] |
| Loss | 13–19 | Jul 2023 | Internazionale di Roma, Italy | W60 | Clay | (Colombia) Yuliana Lizarazo | (Russia) Yuliya Hatouka (Kazakhstan) Zhibek Kulambayeva | 4–6, 4–6 |
| Loss | 13–20 | Jun 2024 | Internazionali di Caserta, Italy | W75 | Clay | (United Kingdom) Ali Collins | (Colombia) Yuliana Lizarazo (Greece) Despina Papamichail | 6–4, 3–6, [3–10] |
| Loss | 13–21 | Aug 2024 | ITF Pilar, Argentina | W35 | Clay | (Bolivia) Noelia Zeballos | (Spain) Alicia Herrero Liñana (Argentina) Melany Krywoj | 1–6, 3–6 |
| Loss | 13–22 | Sep 2024 | ITF Piracicaba, Brazil | W35 | Clay | (Italy) Aurora Zantedeschi | (Italy) Miriana Tona (Bolivia) Noelia Zeballos | 7–5, 1–6, [10–12] |
| Loss | 13–23 | Sep 2024 | ITF San Miguel de Tucumán, Argentina | W50 | Clay | (Italy) Aurora Zantedeschi | (Italy) Nicole Fossa Huergo (Kazakhstan) Zhibek Kulambayeva | 3–6, 6–4, [7–10] |
| Win | 14–23 | May 2025 | ITF Båstad, Sweden | W35 | Clay | (Colombia) Yuliana Lizarazo | (Russia) Anastasia Tikhonova (Sweden) Lisa Zaar | 6–3, 6–2 |
| Loss | 14–24 | Jun 2025 | ITF Palma del Río, Spain | W50 | Hard | (Mexico) Victoria Rodríguez | (China) Feng Shuo (Chinese Taipei) Liang En-shuo | 2–6, 3–6 |
| Loss | 14–25 | Aug 2025 | ITF Cuiabá, Brazil | W35 | Clay | (Peru) Romina Ccuno | (Argentina) Martina Capurro Taborda (Mexico) Marian Gómez Pezuela Cano | 4–6, 3–6 |
| Loss | 14–26 | Sep 2025 | ITF São Paulo, Brazil | W35 | Clay | (Argentina) Jazmín Ortenzi | (Brazil) Ana Candiotto (Brazil) Naná Silva | 4–6, 2–6 |
| Win | 15–26 | Oct 2025 | ITF São João da Boa Vista, Brazil | W15 | Clay | (Argentina) Jazmín Ortenzi | (Brazil) Naná Silva (Brazil) Rebeca Pereira | 6–3, 6–7^{(3)}, [10–7] |
| Loss | 15–27 | May 2026 | ITF Båstad, Sweden | W35 | Clay | (Mexico) Fernanda Navarro | (Netherlands) Britt du Pree (Netherlands) Sarah van Emst | 4–6, 3–4 ret. |
