= Despina Papamichail =

Greek tennis player (born 1993)

Despina Papamichail Δέσποινα Παπαμιχαήλ
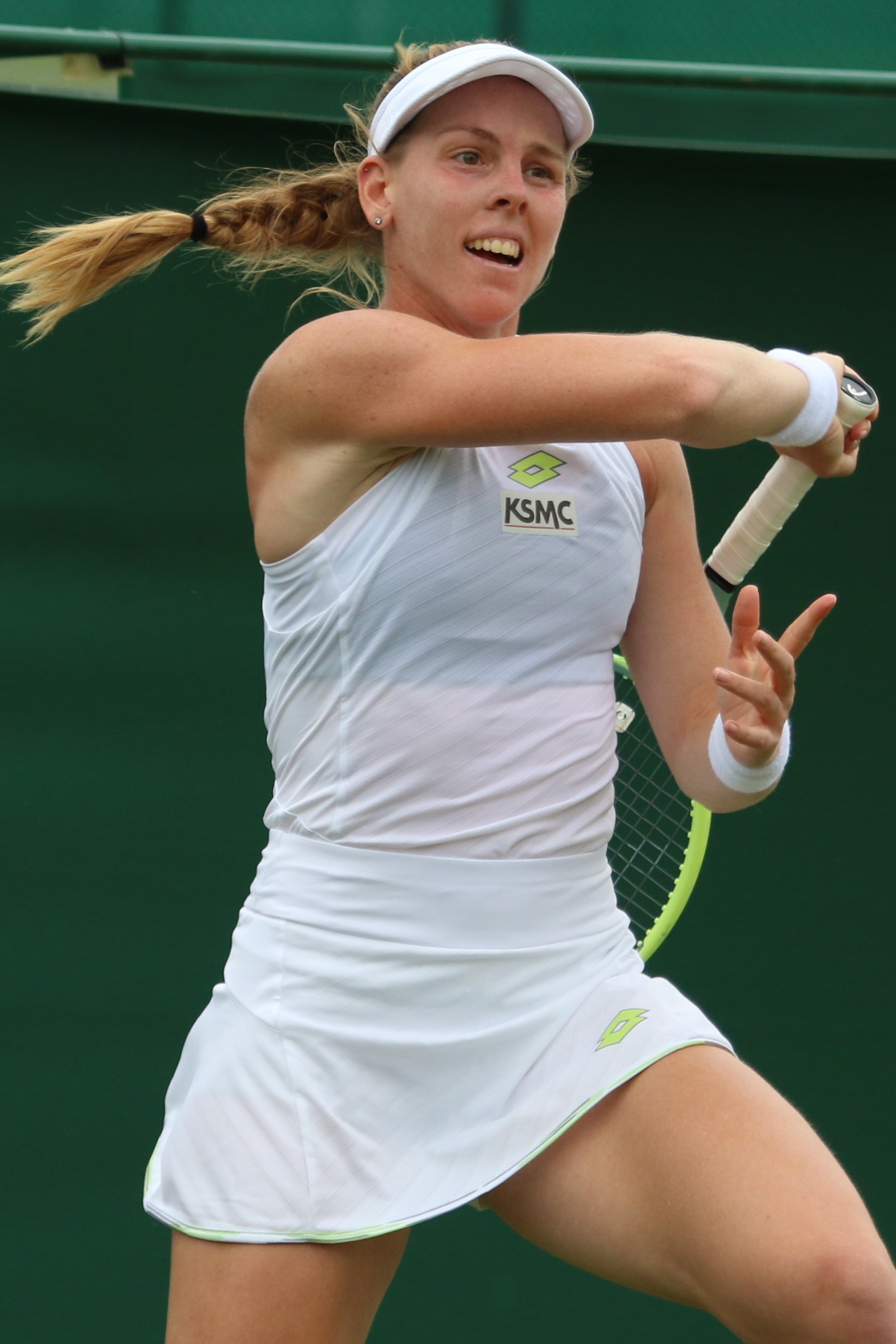
- Despina at the 2023 Wimbledon Championships
- Country (sports): Greece
- Residence: Dubai, UAE
- Born: 9 February 1993 (age 33) Preveza, Greece
- Height: 1.78 m (5 ft 10 in)
- Turned pro: 2008
- Plays: Right (two handed backhand)
- Prize money: $1,080,492

Singles
- Career record: 610–481
- Career titles: 17 ITF
- Highest ranking: No. 143 (17 October 2022)
- Current ranking: No. 189 (12 October 2026)

Grand Slam singles results
- Australian Open: Q2 (2023, 2026)
- French Open: Q2 (2026)
- Wimbledon: Q3 (2023)
- US Open: Q3 (2024)

Doubles
- Career record: 426–259
- Career titles: 3 WTA Challengers, 40 ITF
- Highest ranking: No. 93 (4 December 2023)
- Current ranking: No. 178 (12 October 2026)

Other doubles tournaments
- Olympic Games: 1R (2024)

Team competitions
- Fed Cup: 31–29
- Last updated on: 14 October 2026.

Despina Papamichail (Greek: Δέσποινα Παπαμιχαήλ; born 9 February 1993) is a Greek professional tennis player. She has a career-high singles ranking of world No. 143, reached on 17 October 2022. Her highest doubles ranking is No. 93, achieved on 4 December 2023. Papamichail has won two doubles titles on the WTA Challenger Tour as well as 17 singles and 40 doubles titles on the ITF Women's Circuit.

Playing for the Greece Fed Cup team, Papamichail has a win–loss record of 31–29 (as of May 2026).

== Career ==
Papamichail made her WTA Tour main-draw debut as a lucky loser at the 2021 Abu Dhabi Open, losing to third seed Karolína Plíšková in the first round. In June 2021, she won the inaugural $60k Charleston Pro event by defeating Gabriela Cé in the final.

She was selected to play for Greece at the 2023 United Cup, recording a win over Isabella Shinikova.

Papamichail qualified for the 2023 Pan Pacific Open and defeated lucky loser Sakura Hosogi, before going out in the second round against sixth seed Daria Kasatkina.

She won her first WTA 125 doubles title at the 2023 Barranquilla Open, partnering with Valentini Grammatikopoulou to defeat Yuliana Lizarazo and María Paulina Pérez in the final.

In December 2023, partnering María Lourdes Carlé, she won the doubles title at the WTA 125 Argentina Open, defeating María Paulina Pérez García and Sofia Sewing in the final.

She defeated Maria Mateas to reach the second round at the 2024 Țiriac Foundation Trophy, where she lost to Kathinka von Deichmann.

Teaming with Ekaterine Gorgodze, Papamichail won her third WTA 125 doubles title at the 2026 Tolentino Open, defeating Aneta Kučmová and Aneta Laboutková in the final.

== Performance timeline ==
Key
W	F	SF	QF	#R	RR	Q#	DNQ	A	NH

(W) winner; (F) finalist; (SF) semifinalist; (QF) quarterfinalist; (#R) rounds 4, 3, 2, 1; (RR) round-robin stage; (Q#) qualification round; (DNQ) did not qualify; (A) absent; (NH) not held; (SR) strike rate (events won / competed); (W–L) win–loss record.
To avoid confusion and double counting, these charts are updated at the conclusion of a tournament or when the player's participation has ended.

Only main-draw results in WTA Tour, Grand Slam tournaments, Fed Cup/Billie Jean King Cup and Olympic Games are included in win–loss records.

=== Singles ===
Current through the 2026 Madrid Open.

Tournament	2019	2020	2021	2022	2023	2024	2025	2026	SR	W–L
Grand Slam tournaments
Australian Open	A	A	A	Q1	Q2	Q1	A	Q2	0 / 0	0–0
French Open	A	A	A	Q1	Q1	Q1	A	Q2	0 / 0	0–0
Wimbledon	A	A	A	Q2	Q3	Q2	A	Q1	0 / 0	0–0
US Open	A	A	Q2	Q1	Q2	Q3	A	Q2	0 / 0	0–0
Win–loss	0–0	0–0	0–0	0–0	0–0	0–0	0–0	0–0	0 / 0	0–0
WTA 1000
Madrid Open	A	A	A	A	Q1	A	A	Q1	0 / 0	0–0
Italian Open	A	A	A	A	Q1	A	A	A	0 / 0	0–0
Career statistics
Tournaments	0 (Note: During the season, she did not play in the main draw of any WTA Tour tournaments. However, she played at the Billie Jean King Cup that is not counted as a played tournament but matches count.)	0	1	6	2	0	0	0	Career total: 9	
Overall W–L	1–0	0–1	0–1	3–6	3–7	0–0	0–0	4–0	0 / 15	11–15
Year-end ranking	260	276	184	156	224	281	172		$1,080,492	

== WTA 125 finals ==
=== Doubles: 4 (3 titles, 1 runner-up) ===
Result	W–L	Date	Tournament	Surface	Partner	Opponents	Score
Loss	0–1	Nov 2021	Buenos Aires Open, Argentina	Clay	(Argentina) María Lourdes Carlé	(Romania) Irina Bara (Georgia (country)) Ekaterine Gorgodze	7–5, 5–7, [4–10]
Win	1–1	Aug 2023	Barranquilla Open, Colombia	Hard	(Greece) Valentini Grammatikopoulou	(Colombia) Yuliana Lizarazo (Colombia) María Paulina Pérez	7–6^{(7–2)}, 7–5
Win	2–1	Dec 2023	Buenos Aires Open, Argentina	Clay	(Argentina) María Lourdes Carlé	(Colombia) María Paulina Pérez (United States) Sofia Sewing	6–3, 4–6, [11–9]
Win	3–1	Sep 2026	Tolentino Open, Italy	Clay	(Georgia (country)) Ekaterine Gorgodze	(Czech Republic) Aneta Kučmová (Czech Republic) Aneta Laboutková	6–1, 6–2

== ITF Circuit finals ==
=== Singles: 28 (17 titles, 11 runner-ups) ===
Legend W60 tournaments (1–1) W25/35 tournaments (4–3) W10/15 tournaments (12–7)	Finals by surface Hard (5–5) Clay (12–6)

Result	W–L	Date	Tournament	Tier	Surface	Opponent	Score
Loss	0–1	Jul 2010	ITF Rabat, Morocco	10,000	Clay	(Russia) Anastasia Mukhametova	2–6, 0–6
Win	1–1	Sep 2010	ITF Mytilini, Greece	10,000	Hard	(Germany) Anna Zaja	3–6, 6–3, 7–5
Win	2–1	Apr 2011	ITF Vic, Spain	10,000	Clay	(France) Victoria Larrière	7–6^{(10)}, 6–1
Loss	2–2	May 2011	ITF Petroupoli, Greece	10,000	Hard	(Latvia) Diāna Marcinkēviča	5–7, 7–5, 6–3
Win	3–2	May 2011	ITF Heraklion, Greece	10,000	Hard	(Austria) Nicole Rottmann	6–1, 3–6, 6–2
Loss	3–3	Jan 2014	ITF Sharm El Sheikh, Egypt	10,000	Hard	(Turkey) İpek Soylu	3–6, 6–7^{(0)}
Loss	3–4	Apr 2014	ITF Heraklion, Greece	10,000	Hard	(Greece) Maria Sakkari	1–6, 6–1, 3–6
Win	4–4	Jun 2014	ITF Sharm El Sheikh, Egypt	10,000	Hard	(Russia) Anna Morgina	6–1, 6–3
Loss	4–5	Jun 2014	ITF Sharm El Sheikh, Egypt	10,000	Hard	(United States) Jan Abaza	2–6, 6–3, 4–6
Loss	4–6	Feb 2016	ITF Hammamet, Tunisia	10,000	Clay	(Slovakia) Chantal Škamlová	1–6, 6–4, 3–6
Win	5–6	May 2017	ITF Acre, Israel	15,000	Hard	(Belarus) Sadafmoh Tolibova	6–1, 6–2
Win	6–6	Jul 2017	ITF Tel Aviv, Israel	15,000	Hard	(France) Estelle Cascino	7–6^{(4)}, 6–3
Win	7–6	Jul 2017	ITF Prokuplje, Serbia	15,000	Clay	(Ukraine) Maryna Chernyshova	3–6, 7–6^{(5)}, 6–3
Win	8–6	Sep 2017	ITF Antalya, Turkey	15,000	Clay	(Chile) Bárbara Gatica	6–3, 6–3
Win	9–6	Sep 2017	ITF Antalya, Turkey	15,000	Clay	(Brazil) Carolina Alves	6–1, 6–4
Win	10–6	Sep 2017	ITF Antalya, Turkey	15,000	Clay	(Romania) Raluca Șerban	3–6, 6–2, 7–6^{(6)}
Win	11–6	May 2018	ITF San Severo, Italy	15,000	Clay	(Switzerland) Simona Waltert	6–1, 6–2
Loss	11–7	Feb 2019	ITF Monastir, Tunisia	15,000	Clay	(Sweden) Mirjam Björklund	6–1, 6–7^{(3)}, 3–6
Win	12–7	Apr 2019	ITF Cairo, Egypt	15,000	Clay	(Slovenia) Nastja Kolar	6–3, 4–6, 6–4
Win	13–7	Jul 2019	ITF Getxo, Spain	W25	Clay (i)	(Egypt) Sandra Samir	6–2, 6–4
Win	14–7	Jul 2019	ITF Aschaffenburg, Germany	W25	Clay	(Germany) Jule Niemeier	6–2, 5–7, 6–2
Win	15–7	Jun 2021	ITF Charleston Pro, United States	W60	Clay	(Brazil) Gabriela Cé	1–6, 6–3, 6–3
Loss	15–8	Jun 2022	Internazionali di Brescia, Italy	W60	Clay	(Spain) Ángela Fita Boluda	2–6, 0–6
Loss	15–9	Mar 2024	ITF Alaminos, Cyprus	W35	Clay	(France) Loïs Boisson	2–6, 0–6
Loss	15–10	Apr 2025	ITF Boca Raton, United States	W35	Clay	(Argentina) Luisina Giovannini	1–6, 1–6
Loss	15–11	May 2025	ITF Santo Domingo, Dominican Republic	W35	Hard	(Serbia) Katarina Jokic	6–7^{(8)}, 7–6^{(0)}, 2–6
Win	16–11	Jul 2025	ITF Buzău, Romania	W35	Clay	(Romania) Patricia Maria Țig	6–4, 1–0 ret.
Win	17–11	Jul 2025	ITF Knokke-Heist, Belgium	W35	Clay	(Netherlands) Anouck Vrancken Peeters	6–1, 6–2

=== Doubles: 77 (40 titles, 37 runner-ups) ===
Legend W100 tournaments (0–1) W60/75 tournaments (3–5) W40/50 tournaments (2–2) W25/35 tournaments (11–9) W10/15 tournaments (24–20)	Finals by surface Hard (18–15) Clay (22–21) Carpet (0–1)

Result	W–L	Date	Tournament	Tier	Surface	Partner	Opponents	Score
Loss	0–1	Apr 2011	ITF Vic, Spain	10,000	Clay	(Venezuela) Andrea Gámiz	(Czech Republic) Simona Dobrá (Czech Republic) Tereza Hladíková	2–6, 1–6
Win	1–1	Feb 2012	ITF Bron, France	10,000	Hard (i)	(Latvia) Diāna Marcinkēviča	(Germany) Justine Ozga (Bulgaria) Isabella Shinikova	7–5, 7–5
Win	2–1	Mar 2012	ITF Dijon, France	10,000	Hard (i)	(Latvia) Diāna Marcinkēviča	(Russia) Yana Sizikova (Belgium) Alison Van Uytvanck	7–5, 7–6^{(7)}
Win	3–1	Jul 2012	ITF Torino, Italy	10,000	Clay	(Spain) Lucia Cervera-Vazquez	(France) Estelle Guisard (Austria) Katharina Negrin	3–6, 6–3, [10–6]
Win	4–1	Aug 2012	ITF Locri, Italy	10,000	Clay	(Spain) Sara Sorribes Tormo	(Japan) Kana Daniel (Belarus) Nastassia Rubel	6–1, 6–0
Loss	4–2	Oct 2012	ITF Heraklion, Greece	10,000	Hard	(Greece) Despoina Vogasari	(France) Manon Arcangioli (France) Laëtitia Sarrazin	4–6, 4–6
Win	5–2	Feb 2013	ITF Sharm El Sheikh, Egypt	10,000	Hard	(Italy) Alice Savoretti	(Romania) Elena-Teodora Cadar (Romania) Patricia Maria Țig	6–3, 6–4
Loss	5–3	Apr 2013	ITF Heraklion, Greece	10,000	Hard	(Italy) Giulia Sussarello	(Russia) Marina Melnikova (Serbia) Teodora Mirčić	1–6, 4–6
Win	6–3	Apr 2013	ITF San Severo, Italy	10,000	Clay	(Italy) Giulia Sussarello	(Denmark) Martine Ditlev (Denmark) Malou Ejdesgaard	6–1, 6–4
Win	7–3	Aug 2013	ITF Locri, Italy	10,000	Clay	(Italy) Federica di Sarra	(Italy) Alice Matteucci (Italy) Camilla Rosatello	6–3, 3–6, [10–4]
Loss	7–4	Jan 2014	ITF Sharm El Sheikh	10,000	Hard	(Italy) Gaia Sanesi	(Turkey) Melis Sezer (Turkey) İpek Soylu	6–4, 4–6, [3–10]
Loss	7–5	Jan 2014	ITF Sharm El Sheikh	10,000	Hard	(Russia) Polina Leykina	(Ukraine) Valentyna Ivakhnenko (Ukraine) Veronika Kapshay	6–7, 2–6
Loss	7–6	Mar 2014	ITF Pula, Italy	10,000	Clay	(Italy) Alice Matteucci	(Colombia) Yuliana Lizarazo (Australia) Alexandra Nancarrow	3–6, 6–4, [9–11]
Loss	7–7	Mar 2014	ITF Pula, Italy	10,000	Clay	(Netherlands) Rosalie van der Hoek	(Spain) Olga Sáez Larra (Australia) Alexandra Nancarrow	3–6, 6–4, [8–10]
Loss	7–8	Apr 2014	ITF Heraklion, Greece	10,000	Hard	(Greece) Maria Sakkari	(Russia) Natela Dzalamidze (Greece) Valentini Grammatikopoulou	7–6, 3–6, [5–10]
Win	8–8	Apr 2014	ITF Heraklion, Greece	10,000	Hard	(Russia) Polina Leykina	(Belgium) Marie Benoît (Belgium) Kimberley Zimmermann	6–2, 6–2
Win	9–8	Jun 2014	ITF Sharm El Sheikh	10,000	Hard	(Spain) Arabela Fernández Rabener	(Egypt) Mai El Kamash (Egypt) Yasmin Hamza	6–3, 6–3
Loss	9–9	Aug 2014	ITF Woking, United Kingdom	25,000	Hard	(Italy) Alice Matteucci	(Japan) Yumi Miyazaki (Japan) Mari Tanaka	2–6, 5–7
Win	10–9	Sep 2014	ITF Sofia, Bulgaria	25,000	Clay	(North Macedonia) Lina Gjorcheska	(Slovakia) Rebecca Šramková (Bulgaria) Julia Terziyska	6–1, 6–4
Loss	10–10	Oct 2014	ITF Rock Hill, United States	25,000	Hard	(Austria) Janina Toljan	(Netherlands) Cindy Burger (Canada) Sharon Fichman	6–4, 1–6, [6–10]
Win	11–10	Dec 2014	ITF Navi Mumbai, India	25,000	Hard	(Serbia) Nina Stojanović	(Japan) Miyabi Inoue (Japan) Miki Miyamura	7–6^{(5)}, 6–2
Loss	11–11	Apr 2015	ITF Heraklion, Greece	10,000	Hard	(Serbia) Tamara Čurović	(Russia) Anastasiya Komardina (Greece) Valentini Grammatikopoulou	2–6, 2–6
Win	12–11	May 2015	ITF Pula, Italy	25,000	Clay	(Slovenia) Nastja Kolar	(Romania) Diana Buzean (Italy) Alice Matteucci	6–1, 1–6, [10–8]
Win	13–11	May 2015	ITF Sharm El Sheikh	10,000	Hard	(Italy) Alice Matteucci	(Romania) Elena-Teodora Cadar (Greece) Eleni Kordolaimi	6–3, 6–4
Win	14–11	Jun 2015	ITF Sharm El Sheikh	10,000	Hard	(Italy) Alice Matteucci	(United Kingdom) Grace Dixon (Finland) Ella Leivo	6–1, 6–3
Loss	14–12	Jul 2015	ITF Imola, Italy	25,000	Carpet	(United States) Bernarda Pera	(Italy) Claudia Giovine (Switzerland) Xenia Knoll	5–7, 2–6
Win	15–12	Jul 2015	ITF Rome, Italy	25,000	Clay	(Italy) Claudia Giovine	(United Kingdom) Tara Moore (Switzerland) Conny Perrin	6–4, 7–6^{(2)}
Loss	15–13	Aug 2015	ITF Bad Saulgau, Germany	25,000	Clay	(Greece) Maria Sakkari	(Romania) Cristina Dinu (Romania) Diana Buzean	6–2, 3–6, [8–10]
Win	16–13	Aug 2015	ITF Woking, United Kingdom	25,000	Hard	(Italy) Claudia Giovine	(United Kingdom) Harriet Dart (United Kingdom) Katy Dunne	6–2, 6–1
Win	17–13	Sep 2015	ITF Antalya, Turkey	10,000	Hard	(Serbia) Nina Stojanović	(Italy) Cristiana Ferrando (Switzerland) Chiara Grimm	1–6, 6–1, [10–5]
Win	18–13	Sep 2015	ITF Pula, Italy	10,000	Clay	(France) Carla Touly	(Switzerland) Nina Stadler (Belgium) Kimberley Zimmermann	6–3, 6–4
Loss	18–14	Jan 2016	ITF Cairo, Egypt	10,000	Clay	(Egypt) Ola Abou Zekry	(Czech Republic) Petra Krejsová (Slovakia) Chantal Škamlová	4–6, 0–6
Loss	18–15	Jan 2016	ITF Cairo, Egypt	10,000	Clay	(Egypt) Ola Abou Zekry	(Czech Republic) Petra Krejsová (Slovakia) Chantal Škamlová	6–7^{(2)}, 3–6
Loss	18–16	Feb 2016	ITF Hammamet, Tunisia	10,000	Clay	(Slovakia) Chantal Škamlová	(Canada) Petra Januskova (Belarus) Sviatlana Pirazhenka	3–6, 2–6
Win	19–16	Feb 2016	ITF Hammamet, Tunisia	10,000	Clay	(Slovakia) Chantal Škamlová	(Canada) Petra Januskova (Belarus) Sviatlana Pirazhenka	6–2, 6–7^{(5)}, [10–5]
Win	20–16	Mar 2016	ITF Hammamet, Tunisia	10,000	Clay	(Italy) Georgia Brescia	(Italy) Alice Balducci (Italy) Claudia Giovine	4–6, 6–2, [10–7]
Loss	20–17	Mar 2016	ITF Sharm El Sheikh	10,000	Hard	(Switzerland) Karin Kennel	(Ukraine) Veronika Kapshay (Ukraine) Anastasiya Shoshyna	1–6, 2–6
Loss	20–18	Apr 2016	ITF Sharm El Sheikh	10,000	Hard	(Egypt) Ola Abou Zekry	(Russia) Anastasia Pribylova (Hungary) Naomi Totka	1–6, 6–3, [12–14]
Win	21–18	Apr 2016	ITF Sharm El Sheikh	10,000	Hard	(United Kingdom) Samantha Murray	(Egypt) Ola Abou Zekry (Romania) Jaqueline Cristian	6–3, 6–2
Win	22–18	May 2016	ITF Sharm El Sheikh	10,000	Hard	(United Kingdom) Samantha Murray	(India) Nidhi Chilumula (India) Rishika Sunkara	3–6, 6–2, [10–1]
Loss	22–19	Jun 2016	ITF Amarante, Portugal	10,000	Hard	(Switzerland) Jessica Crivelletto	(Slovakia) Tereza Mihalíková (Portugal) Inês Murta	6–7^{(5)}, 3–6
Win	23–19	Aug 2016	ITF Târgu Jiu, Romania	10,000	Clay	(Romania) Jaqueline Cristian	(Argentina) Julieta Estable (Argentina) Daniela Farfan	6–7^{(5)}, 6–0, [10–5]
Win	24–19	Aug 2016	ITF Sharm El Sheikh	10,000	Hard	(Montenegro) Ana Veselinović	(Turkey) Berfu Cengiz (India) Dhruthi Tatachar Venugopal	7–6^{(4)}, 1–6, [10–5]
Win	25–19	Nov 2016	ITF Heraklion, Greece	10,000	Hard	(France) Manon Arcangioli	(Denmark) Emilie Francati (United Kingdom) Sarah Beth Grey	6–4, 6–2
Win	26–19	Jan 2017	ITF Hammamet, Tunisia	15,000	Clay	(Brazil) Laura Pigossi	(France) Victoria Muntean (China) Sun Xuliu	6–3, 4–6, [10–5]
Loss	26–20	Mar 2017	ITF Heraklion, Greece	15,000	Clay	(Ukraine) Olga Ianchuk	(Austria) Mira Antonitsch (India) Karman Thandi	0–6, 3–6
Loss	26–21	Apr 2017	ITF Cairo, Egypt	15,000	Clay	(Serbia) Bojana Marinković	(Georgia (country)) Mariam Bolkvadze (Slovakia) Tereza Mihalíková	6–7^{(7)}, 3–6
Win	27–21	May 2017	ITF Acre, Israel	15,000	Hard	(Israel) Vlada Ekshibarova	(Israel) Shelly Krolitzky (Israel) Maya Tahan	6–4, 6–3
Loss	27–22	Jan 2018	ITF Hammamet, Tunisia	15,000	Clay	(Argentina) Catalina Pella	(Switzerland) Karin Kennel (Russia) Maria Marfutina	5–7, 2–6
Win	28–22	Jul 2018	Versmold Open, Germany	60,000	Clay	(Turkey) Pemra Özgen	(Serbia) Olga Danilović (Serbia) Nina Stojanović	1–6, 6–2, [10–4]
Win	29–22	Jul 2018	ITF Darmstadt, Germany	25,000	Clay	(Italy) Martina Colmegna	(Germany) Romy Kölzer (Venezuela) Aymet Uzcátegui	6–4, 3–6, [10–6]
Win	30–22	Oct 2018	ITF Riba-roja de Túria, Spain	25,000	Clay	(Spain) Aliona Bolsova	(Spain) Marina Bassols Ribera (Spain) Ángela Fita Boluda	6–2, 6–2
Loss	30–23	Feb 2019	ITF Monastir, Tunisia	W15	Clay	(Spain) Andrea Lázaro García	(Romania) Miriam Bulgaru (Romania) Cristina Ene	3–6, 6–7^{(5)}
Loss	30–24	Feb 2019	ITF Monastir, Tunisia	W15	Clay	(Spain) Andrea Lázaro García	(Netherlands) Arianne Hartono (Netherlands) Eva Vedder	4–6, 6–3 [7–10]
Win	31–24	Apr 2019	ITF Cairo, Egypt	W15	Clay	(Austria) Melanie Klaffner	(Brazil) Júlia Konishi Camargo Silva (Ukraine) Katya Malikova	6–3, 6–1
Win	32–24	Apr 2019	ITF Cairo, Egypt	W15	Clay	(Switzerland) Simona Waltert	(Egypt) Mayar Sherif (Egypt) Rana Sherif Ahmed	6–3, 6–2
Loss	32–25	May 2019	Torneo Conchita Martínez, Spain	W25	Hard	(Serbia) Nina Stojanović	(Croatia) Jana Fett (Hungary) Dalma Gálfi	6–7^{(2)}, 2–6
Loss	32–26	May 2019	ITF Jerusalem, Israel	W25	Hard	(United Kingdom) Samantha Murray	(Belarus) Yuliya Hatouka (Slovakia) Tereza Mihalíková	6–2, 4–6, [8–10]
Loss	32–27	Jul 2019	ITF Aschaffenburg, Germany	W25	Clay	(Spain) Irene Burillo	(Italy) Tatiana Pieri (Australia) Ivana Popovic	6–7^{(5)}, 4–6
Win	33–27	Sep 2019	ITF Frýdek-Místek, Czech Republic	W25	Clay	(Croatia) Lea Bošković	(Romania) Oana Georgeta Simion (Germany) Julia Wachaczyk	6–3, 6–2
Loss	33–28	Dec 2019	ITF Solapur, India	W25	Hard	(Turkey) Berfu Cengiz	(Norway) Ulrikke Eikeri (India) Ankita Raina	7–5, 4–6, [3–10]
Win	34–28	Oct 2021	ITF Loulé, Portugal	W25	Hard	(Serbia) Natalija Stevanović	(Portugal) Francisca Jorge (Portugal) Matilde Jorge	6–2, 7–5
Win	35–28	Jun 2022	Internazionali di Caserta, Italy	W60	Clay	(Italy) Camilla Rosatello	(Portugal) Francisca Jorge (Portugal) Matilde Jorge	4–6, 6–2, [10–6]
Loss	35–29	Jun 2022	Macha Lake Open, Czech Republic	W60	Clay	(Italy) Nuria Brancaccio	(Czech Republic) Karolína Kubáňová (Czech Republic) Aneta Kučmová	2–6, 6–7^{(9)}
Win	36–29	Feb 2023	ITF Mexico City, Mexico	W40	Hard	(Cyprus) Raluca Șerban	(Colombia) Yuliana Lizarazo (Colombia) María Paulina Pérez	3–6, 6–4, [10–4]
Loss	36–30	May 2023	Open Villa de Madrid, Spain	W100	Clay	(Greece) Eleni Christofi	(Japan) Mai Hontama (Japan) Eri Hozumi	0–6, 5–7
Loss	36–31	Jun 2023	Internazionali di Caserta, Italy	W60	Clay	(Italy) Camilla Rosatello	Anastasia Tikhonova (Japan) Moyuka Uchijima	4–6, 2–6
Win	37–31	Mar 2024	ITF Alaminos, Cyprus	W35	Clay	(Malta) Francesca Curmi	(Switzerland) Leonie Küng (United Kingdom) Eliz Maloney	6–3, 6–2
Loss	37–32	May 2024	Chiasso Open, Italy	W75	Clay	(Switzerland) Simona Waltert	(United Kingdom) Emily Appleton (Germany) Lena Papadakis	6–4, 4–6, [6–10]
Win	38–32	Jun 2024	Internazionali di Caserta, Italy	W75	Clay	(Colombia) Yuliana Lizarazo	(United Kingdom) Ali Collins (Colombia) María Paulina Pérez	4–6, 6–3, [10–3]
Loss	38–33	Mar 2025	ITF Chihuahua, Mexico	W50	Clay	(Greece) Eleni Christofi	(United States) Jessie Aney (United States) Jessica Failla	3–6, 5–7
Loss	38–34	Mar 2025	Vacaria Open, Brazil	W75	Clay (i)	(Argentina) Julia Riera	(United States) Robin Anderson (Spain) Alicia Herrero Liñana	5–7, 4–6
Loss	38–35	Apr 2025	ITF Boca Raton, United States	W35	Clay	(Bulgaria) Gergana Topalova	(United States) Ayana Akli (Morocco) Diae El Jardi	6–7^{(1)}, 5–7
Win	39–35	Jul 2025	ITF Knokke-Heist, Belgium	W35	Clay	(Italy) Anastasia Abbagnato	(France) Yara Bartashevich (Netherlands) Sarah van Emst	7–5, 6–1
Loss	39–36	Sep 2025	ITF Bucharest, Romania	W75	Clay	(Algeria) Inès Ibbou	(Switzerland) Jenny Dürst (Slovakia) Nina Vargová	1–6, 1–6
Win	40–36	Oct 2026	ITF Heraklion, Greece	W50	Clay	(Italy) Nuria Brancaccio	(Armenia) Ani Amiraghyan; Elina Nepliy	walkover
Loss	40–37	Nov 2026	ITF Chihuahua, Mexico	W50	Hard	(Canada) Kayla Cross	(Ukraine) Valeriya Strakhova; Anastasia Tikhonova	0–6, 6–7^{(4)}
