= María Lourdes Carlé =

Argentine tennis player (born 2000)

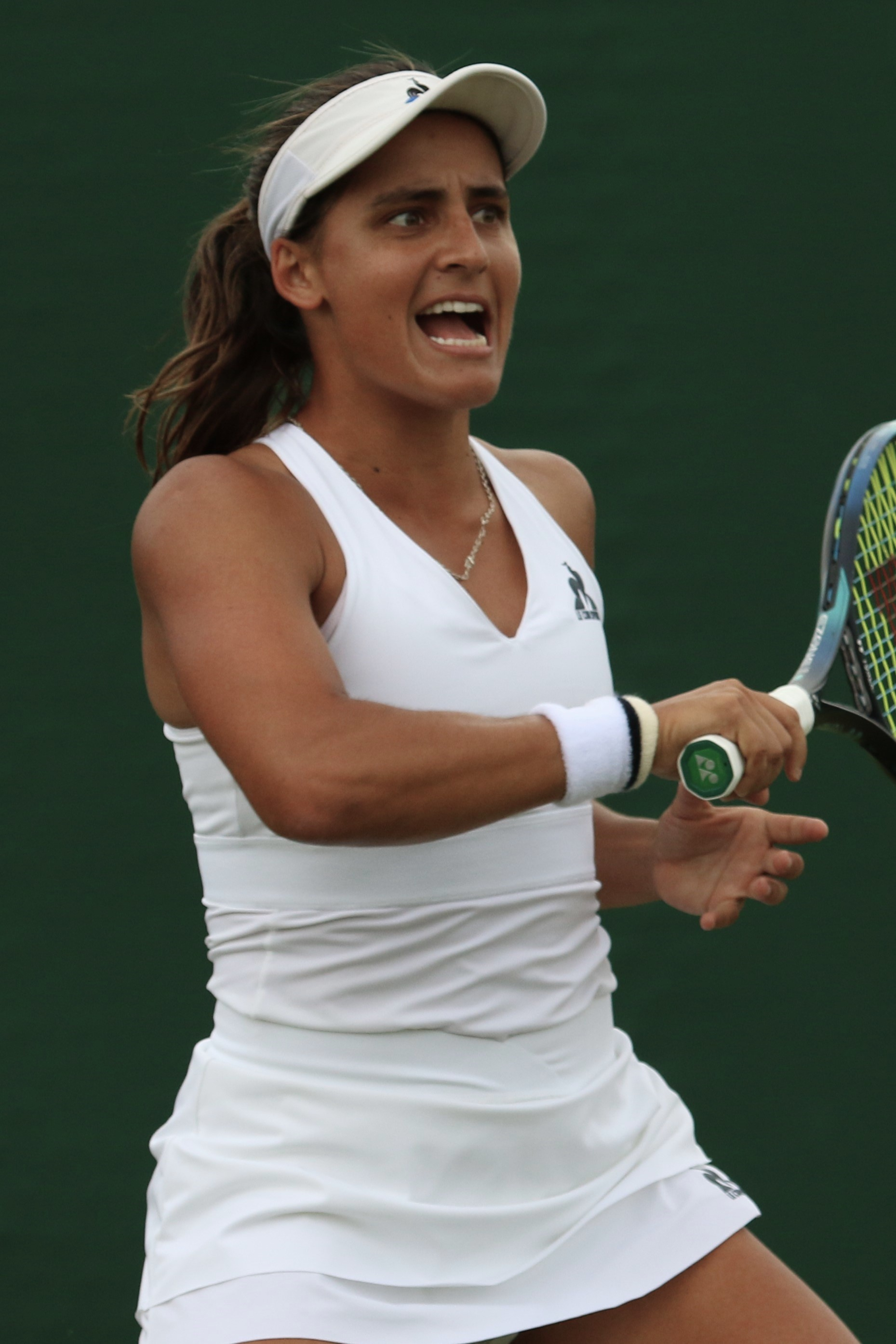
- Carlé at the 2023 Wimbledon Championships
- Country (sports): Argentina
- Residence: Tandil, Argentina
- Born: 10 February 2000 (age 26) Daireaux, Argentina
- Height: 1.66 m (5 ft 5 in)
- Coach: Matias Caceres
- Prize money: US$ 1,454,898

Singles
- Career record: 347–216
- Career titles: 1 WTA Challenger
- Highest ranking: No. 71 (6 May 2024)
- Current ranking: No. 232 (2 November 2026)

Grand Slam singles results
- Australian Open: 1R (2025)
- French Open: 1R (2024, 2025)
- Wimbledon: 1R (2024)
- US Open: 1R (2024)

Other tournaments
- Olympic Games: 2R (2024)

Doubles
- Career record: 132–83
- Career titles: 4 WTA Challengers
- Highest ranking: No. 124 (11 November 2024)
- Current ranking: No. 176 (2 November 2026)

Grand Slam doubles results
- French Open: 1R (2024)

Other doubles tournaments
- Olympic Games: 2R (2024)

Team competitions
- Fed Cup: 8–4
Medal record
tennis
Representing Argentina
Pan American Games
Silver medal – second place	2023 Santiago	Singles
Bronze medal – third place	2023 Santiago	Doubles
- Last updated on: 2 November 2026.

María Lourdes Carlé (Spanish pronunciation: [maɾja ˈluɾðes kaɾˈle]; born 10 February 2000) is an Argentine professional tennis player. She has a career-high WTA singles ranking of No. 71, achieved on 6 May 2024, and a best doubles ranking of 124, achieved on 11 November 2024.

Carlé has won one singles and four doubles titles on the WTA Challenger Tour. On the ITF Circuit, she has won thirteen singles and six doubles titles.

On the ITF Junior Circuit, Carlé had a career-high ranking of No. 9, achieved in November 2017. She played 2018–19 one season of college tennis for the Georgia Bulldogs in the United States, helping the team win the Southeastern Conference (SEC) regular season title, and was named to the All-SEC second team and SEC All-Freshman team.

Playing for Argentina in Billie Jean King Cup, Carlé has a win–loss record of 8–4 (as of November 2026).

== Career ==
=== Juniors ===
==== Grand Slam performance ====
Singles:

- Australian Open: –
- French Open: 3R (2018)
- Wimbledon: 3R (2018)
- US Open: 1R (2018)

Doubles:

- Australian Open: –
- French Open: SF (2017)
- Wimbledon: 1R (2016)
- US Open: –

=== 2022–2023: WTA Tour debut, Pan American Games gold ===
Carlé made her WTA Tour debut at the 2022 Copa Colsanitas, losing to Tatjana Maria in the first round.

During the 2023 Pan American Games in Santiago, she won two medals for Argentina. She advanced to the women's singles gold medal match, earning her a spot in the 2024 Summer Olympics singles tournament. Carlé also won the bronze medal in women's doubles, partnering with Julia Riera.

In December 2023, Carlé reached her first WTA 125 singles final at the Buenos Aires Open, but lost to Laura Pigossi. She won the doubles title at the same tournament with Despina Papamichail, defeating María Paulina Pérez and Sofia Sewing in the final. The following week, Carlé made it back-to-back WTA 125 doubles titles, partnering Julia Riera to overcome Freya Christie and Yuliana Lizarazo in the final at the Montevideo Open.

=== 2024: WTA 1000 debut, top 75 ===
Carlé reached the WTA singles top 100 on 4 March 2024 at world No. 99. Two weeks later, she qualified to make her WTA 1000 main draw debut at the Miami Open, losing to wildcard entrant Brenda Fruhvirtová in the first round. In April, she won her first WTA 125 singles title at the Solgironès Open in La Bisbal d'Empordà, Spain, defeating Rebeka Masarova in the final.

Ranked No. 82 at the Madrid Open, she qualified for the main draw and defeated wildcard entrant and 2021 US Open champion, Emma Raducanu, and 17th seed Veronika Kudermetova, recording her first WTA 1000 wins, before losing to ninth seed and 2017 French Open champion, Jelena Ostapenko, in the third round. As a result, she moved in the rankings into the top 75.

Partnering with Simona Waltert, Carlé was runner-up in the doubles at the WTA 125 Montreux Open, losing to Quinn Gleason and Ingrid Martins in the final which went to a deciding champions tiebreak. In November, she reached the final at the WTA 125 Copa Santiago, losing to Nina Stojanović in three sets.

=== 2025–2026: First WTA Tour doubles final and singles quarterfinal ===
Partnering Simona Waltert, Carlé made it into her first WTA Tour doubles final at the 2025 Iași Open, but they lost to Veronika Erjavec and Panna Udvardy in straight sets. At the same tournament, she also reached the singles quarterfinals for the first time at a WTA Tour event, defeating wildcard entrant Patricia Maria Țig and top seed Elina Avanesyan, before losing to Sorana Cîrstea in the last eight.

Carlé qualified for the 2026 Hamburg Open and defeated fellow qualifier Jule Niemeier to record her first WTA Tour main-draw match win in 12 months. She lost to second seed Anhelina Kalinina in the second round.

== Performance timeline ==
Key
W	F	SF	QF	#R	RR	Q#	P#	DNQ	A	Z#	PO	G	S	B	NMS	NTI	P	NH

(W) winner; (F) finalist; (SF) semifinalist; (QF) quarterfinalist; (#R) rounds 4, 3, 2, 1; (RR) round-robin stage; (Q#) qualification round; (P#) preliminary round; (DNQ) did not qualify; (A) absent; (Z#) Davis/Fed Cup Zonal Group (with number indication) or (PO) play-off; (G) gold, (S) silver or (B) bronze Olympic/Paralympic medal; (NMS) not a Masters tournament; (NTI) not a Tier I tournament; (P) postponed; (NH) not held; (SR) strike rate (events won / competed); (W–L) win–loss record.
To avoid confusion and double counting, these charts are updated at the conclusion of a tournament or when the player's participation has ended.

=== Singles ===
Current through the 2026 US Open.

Tournament	2021	2022	2023	2024	2025	2026	SR	W–L
Grand Slam tournaments
Australian Open	A	A	Q1	A	1R	Q2	0 / 1	0–1
French Open	A	A	Q2	1R	1R	Q3	0 / 2	0–2
Wimbledon	A	Q3	Q2	1R	Q2	Q2	0 / 1	0–1
US Open	A	Q2	Q1	1R	Q1	Q1	0 / 1	0–1
Win–loss	0–0	0–0	0–0	0–3	0–2	0–0	0 / 5	0–5
WTA 1000
Guadalajara Open	NH	Q1	A	A	A		0 / 0	0–0
Career statistics
Tournaments	0 (Note: During the season, she did not play in the main-draw of any WTA Tour-level tournaments. However, she played at the Billie Jean King Cup, which is not counted as a played tournament but as matches counted.)	2	1	4	4		Career total: 3	
Overall win-loss	2–0	3–4	0–1	2–3	1–2		0 / 10	8–10
Year-end ranking	262	161	153	95	128		$1,410,680	

== WTA Tour finals ==
=== Doubles: 1 (runner-up) ===
Legend WTA 1000 (–) WTA 500 (–) WTA 250 (0–1)	Finals by surface Hard (–) Clay (0–1) Grass (–)

Result	W–L	Date	Tournament	Tier	Surface	Partner	Opponents	Score
Loss	0–1	Jul 2025	Iași Open, Romania	WTA 250	Clay	(Switzerland) Simona Waltert	(Slovenia) Veronika Erjavec (Hungary) Panna Udvardy	5–7, 3–6

== WTA 125 finals ==
=== Singles: 3 (1 title, 2 runner-ups) ===
Result	W–L	Date	Tournament	Surface	Opponent	Score
Loss	0–1	Dec 2023	Buenos Aires Open, Argentina	Clay	(Brazil) Laura Pigossi	3–6, 2–6
Win	1–1	Apr 2024	Solgironès Open, Spain	Clay	(Spain) Rebeka Masarova	3–6, 6–1, 6–2
Loss	1–2	Nov 2024	Copa LP Chile, Chile	Clay	(Serbia) Nina Stojanović	6–3, 4–6, 4–6

=== Doubles: 8 (4 titles, 4 runner-ups) ===
Result	W–L	Date	Tournament	Surface	Partner	Opponents	Score
Loss	0–1	Nov 2021	Buenos Aires Open, Argentina	Clay	(Greece) Despina Papamichail	(Romania) Irina Bara (Georgia (country)) Ekaterine Gorgodze	7–5, 5–7, [4–10]
Win	1–1	Dec 2023	Buenos Aires Open, Argentina	Clay	(Greece) Despina Papamichail	(Colombia) María Paulina Pérez (United States) Sofia Sewing	6–3, 4–6, [11–9]
Win	2–1	Dec 2023	Montevideo Open, Uruguay	Clay	(Argentina) Julia Riera	(United Kingdom) Freya Christie (Colombia) Yuliana Lizarazo	7–6^{(7–5)}, 7–5
Loss	2–2	Jul 2024	Båstad Open, Sweden	Clay	(Argentina) Julia Riera	(Thailand) Peangtarn Plipuech (Chinese Taipei) Tsao Chia-yi	5–7, 3–6
Loss	2–3	Sep 2024	Montreux Ladies Open, Switzerland	Clay	(Switzerland) Simona Waltert	(United States) Quinn Gleason (Brazil) Ingrid Martins	3–6, 6–4, [7–10]
Win	3–3	Mar 2025	Antalya Challenger 2, Turkey	Clay	(Switzerland) Simona Waltert	(Czech Republic) Maja Chwalińska (Czech Republic) Anastasia Dețiuc	3–6, 7–5, [10–3]
Win	4–3	Nov 2025	Colina Challenger, Chile	Clay	(Spain) Sara Sorribes Tormo	(France) Léolia Jeanjean (Ukraine) Valeriya Strakhova	6–2, 6–4
Loss	4–4	Nov 2026	Cali Open, Colombia	Clay	(Brazil) Laura Pigossi	(United States) Anna Rogers (United States) Allura Zamarripa	6–7^{(5–7)}, 5–7

== ITF Circuit finals ==
=== Singles: 15 (13 titles, 2 runner-ups) ===
Legend W60/75 tournaments (3–0) W40 tournaments (1–0) W25 tournaments (2–0) W15 tournaments (7–2)	Finals by surface Hard (4–1) Clay (9–1)

Result	W–L	Date	Tournament	Tier	Surface	Opponent	Score
Loss	0–1	May 2017	ITF Antalya, Turkey	W25	Clay	(Russia) Varvara Flink	4–6, 6–7^{(5)}
Win	1–1	Sep 2017	ITF Buenos Aires, Argentina	W15	Clay	(Argentina) Stephanie Petit	2–6, 6–2, 7–6^{(5)}
Win	2–1	Mar 2018	ITF São José dos Campos, Brazil	W15	Clay	(Argentina) Victoria Bosio	7–5, 1–6, 6–2
Win	3–1	Jun 2019	ITF Wesley Chapel, United States	W15	Clay	(United States) Victoria Emma	6–3, 6–1
Win	4–1	Sep 2019	ITF Buenos Aires, Argentina	W15	Clay	(Argentina) Julieta Lara Estable	6–4, 7–6^{(5)}
Win	5–1	Feb 2020	ITF Cancún, Mexico	W15	Hard	(United States) Dasha Ivanova	6–4, 6–0
Loss	5–2	Oct 2020	ITF Monastir, Tunisia	W15	Hard	(Spain) Yvonne Cavallé Reimers	3–6, 6–7^{(4)}
Win	6–2	Oct 2020	ITF Monastir, Tunisia	W15	Hard	(Poland) Weronika Falkowska	6–3, 2–6, 6–1
Win	7–2	Oct 2020	ITF Monastir, Tunisia	W15	Hard	(Poland) Weronika Falkowska	6–4, 6–3
Win	8–2	Jun 2021	ITF Santo Domingo, Dominican Republic	W25	Hard	(Switzerland) Conny Perrin	6–4, 6–0
Win	9–2	May 2022	Pelham Pro Classic, United States	W60	Clay	(United States) Elvina Kalieva	6–1, 6–1
Win	10–2	May 2023	ITF Bastad, Sweden	W25	Clay	(Turkey) İpek Öz	6–4, 6–3
Win	11–2	May 2023	ITF Bodrum, Turkey	W60	Clay	(Romania) Irina Bara	6–4, 6–4
Win	12–2	Sep 2023	ITF Pazardzhik, Bulgaria	W40	Clay	(Turkey) Çağla Büyükakçay	6–1, 6–2
Win	13–2	Jan 2024	Vero Beach Open, United States	W75+H	Clay	(Romania) Gabriela Lee	6–4, 7–6^{(4)}

=== Doubles: 14 (6 titles, 8 runner-ups) ===
Legend W60 tournaments (1–2) W40/50 tournaments (1–0) W25 tournaments (2–4) W15 tournaments (2–2)	Finals by surface Hard (0–2) Clay (6–6)

Result	W–L	Date	Tournament	Tier	Surface	Partner	Opponents	Score
Win	1–0	Sep 2017	ITF Buenos Aires, Argentina	W15	Clay	(United Kingdom) Emily Appleton	(Argentina) Julieta Lara Estable (Argentina) Melina Ferrero	6–3, 6–1
Loss	1–1	Sep 2019	ITF Buenos Aires, Argentina	W15	Clay	(Argentina) Julieta Lara Estable	(Argentina) Candela Bugnon (Argentina) Guillermina Naya	2–6, 6–1, [8–10]
Win	2–1	Feb 2020	ITF Cancún, Mexico	W15	Clay	(Brazil) Thaisa Grana Pedretti	(United States) Kendra Bunch (Serbia) Katarina Kozarov	w/o
Loss	2–2	Oct 2020	ITF Monastir, Tunisia	W15	Hard	(Denmark) Olivia Gram	(Russia) Darya Astakhova (Latvia) Darja Semenistaja	4–6, 3–6
Loss	2–3	Apr 2021	ITF Villa María, Argentina	W25	Clay	(Argentina) Victoria Bosio	(Greece) Valentini Grammatikopoulou (Netherlands) Richèl Hogenkamp	2–6, 2–6
Loss	2–4	Jul 2021	ITF Les Contamines-Montjoie, France	W25	Hard	(Switzerland) Ylena In-Albon	(Latvia) Diāna Marcinkēviča (United States) Chiara Scholl	6–3, 2–6, [7–10]
Loss	2–5	Aug 2021	ITF San Bartolomé, Spain	W60	Clay	(Argentina) Julieta Lara Estable	(Netherlands) Arianne Hartono (Australia) Olivia Tjandramulia	4–6, 6–2, [7–10]
Win	3–5	Oct 2021	ITF Lima, Peru	W25	Clay	(Brazil) Laura Pigossi	(Colombia) María Paulina Pérez (Colombia) Jessica Plazas	6–1, 6–1
Win	4–5	Nov 2021	Aberto da República, Brazil	W60	Clay	(Brazil) Carolina Alves	(Ukraine) Valeriya Strakhova (Australia) Olivia Tjandramulia	6–2, 6–1
Win	5–5	Feb 2022	ITF Tucumán, Argentina	W25	Clay	(Argentina) Julieta Lara Estable	(Italy) Nicole Fossa Huergo (Bolivia) Noelia Zeballos	3–6, 6–0, [10–7]
Loss	5–6	Mar 2022	ITF Anapoima, Colombia	W25	Clay	(Brazil) Laura Pigossi	(Switzerland) Ylena In-Albon (Hungary) Réka Luca Jani	6–1, 3–6, [7–10]
Loss	5–7	Mar 2022	Open Medellín, Colombia	W25	Clay	(Brazil) Laura Pigossi	(Switzerland) Conny Perrin (Chile) Daniela Seguel	2–6, 7–5, [8–10]
Loss	5–8	Jun 2022	Open de Biarritz, France	W60	Clay	(Russia) Maria Timofeeva	(Kazakhstan) Anna Danilina (Ukraine) Valeriya Strakhova	6–2, 3–6, [12–14]
Win	6–8	Jun 2026	ITF Stuttgart-Vaihingen, Germany	W50	Clay	(Argentina) Julia Riera	(Ukraine) Anastasiia Sobolieva (Ukraine) Anastasiya Zaparyniuk	6–2, 6–3

== Billie Jean King Cup ==
=== Singles (4–2) ===
Edition	Round	Date	Location	Against	Surface	Opponent	W/L	Score
2021	F PO	Apr 2021	Córdoba (ARG)	Kazakhstan	Clay	Elena Rybakina	W	6–4, 3–6, 6–0
2021	F PO	Apr 2021	Córdoba (ARG)	Kazakhstan	Clay	Yulia Putintseva	W	6–7^{(3)}, 7–6^{(3)}, ret.

=== Doubles (1–2) ===
Edition	Round	Date	Location	Against	Surface	Partner	Opponents	W/L	Score
2016	WG2 PO	Apr 2016	Kyiv (UKR)	Ukraine	Hard	Guadalupe Pérez Rojas	Katerina Bondarenko; Olga Savchuk	L	1–6, 3–6
2021	ZG1 RR	Feb 2021	Santiago (CHI)	Peru	Clay	Guillermina Naya	Dana Guzmán; Camila Soares	W	6–3, 4–6, 6–1
2021	F PO	Apr 2021	Córdoba (ARG)	Kazakhstan	Clay	Nadia Podoroska	Anna Danilina; Yaroslava Shvedova	L	0–6, 5–7

== Notes ==
Preceded by (Canada) Bianca Andreescu	Orange Bowl U16 Girls Champion; 2015	Succeeded by (United States) Katie Volynets
