= 2021 WTA Argentina Open =

Tennis tournament

- Date: 1–7 November 2021
- Edition: 1st (as WTA 125)
- Category: WTA 125
- Prize money: $115,000
- Surface: Clay
- Location: Buenos Aires, Argentina
- Venue: Buenos Aires Lawn Tennis Club

Champions

Singles
- (Hungary) Anna Bondár

Doubles
- (Romania) Irina Bara / (Georgia (country)) Ekaterine Gorgodze
← 1987 ·	WTA Argentine Open	· 2022 →

The 2021 WTA Argentina Open was a professional tennis tournament played on outdoor clay courts. It was the first edition of the tournament since 1987 and first as part of the 2021 WTA 125 tournaments. It took place at the Buenos Aires Lawn Tennis Club in Buenos Aires, Argentina between 1 and 7 November 2021.

== Singles main-draw entrants ==
=== Seeds ===
Country	Player	Rank^{1}	Seed
EGY	Mayar Sherif	64	1
BRA	Beatriz Haddad Maia	91	2
HUN	Anna Bondár	133	3
ROU	Irina Bara	138	4
HUN	Panna Udvardy	139	5
GEO	Ekaterine Gorgodze	161	6
FRA	Diane Parry	194	7
GRE	Despina Papamichail	198	8

- ^{1} Rankings are as of 25 October 2021.

=== Other entrants ===
The following players received wildcards into the singles main draw:

- (Argentina) Julieta Estable
- (Argentina) Sofía Luini
- (Argentina) Jazmín Ortenzi
- (Argentina) Solana Sierra

The following players received entry from the qualifying draw:

- (Argentina) María Victoria Burstein
- (Argentina) Martina Capurro Taborda
- (Argentina) Sol Faga
- (Argentina) Luciana Moyano

=== Withdrawals ===
Before the tournament

- (Switzerland) Susan Bandecchi → replaced by (Spain) Irene Burillo Escorihuela
- (Netherlands) Indy de Vroome → replaced by (Germany) Katharina Gerlach
- (Italy) Federica Di Sarra → replaced by (Russia) Elina Avanesyan
- (Croatia) Jana Fett → replaced by (Brazil) Laura Pigossi
- (Austria) Julia Grabher → replaced by (Argentina) María Lourdes Carlé
- (Switzerland) Ylena In-Albon → replaced by (Spain) Andrea Lázaro García
- (Switzerland) Leonie Küng → replaced by (Chile) Bárbara Gatica
- (Romania) Gabriela Lee → replaced by (Andorra) Victoria Jiménez Kasintseva
- (Australia) Seone Mendez → replaced by (China) You Xiaodi
- (Croatia) Tereza Mrdeža → replaced by (Colombia) Emiliana Arango
- (Mexico) Renata Zarazúa → replaced by (Brazil) Carolina Alves

== Doubles main-draw entrants ==
=== Seeds ===
Country	Player	Country	Player	Rank^{1}	Seed
ROU	Irina Bara	GEO	Ekaterine Gorgodze	231	1
BRA	Carolina Alves	BRA	Laura Pigossi	331	2
HUN	Anna Bondár	HUN	Panna Udvardy	419	3
CHI	Bárbara Gatica	BRA	Rebeca Pereira	470	4

- Rankings are as of October 25, 2021

=== Other entrants ===
The following pairs received a wildcard into the doubles main draw:

- (Argentina) Marina Bulbarella / (Argentina) María Victoria Burstein
- (Argentina) Martina Capurro Taborda / (Argentina) Luciana Moyano
- (Argentina) Martina Roldán Santander / (Argentina) Merlina Sarno

== Champions ==
=== Singles ===
- (Hungary) Anna Bondár def. (France) Diane Parry 6–3, 6–3

=== Doubles ===
- (Romania) Irina Bara / (Georgia (country)) Ekaterine Gorgodze def. (Argentina) María Lourdes Carlé / (Greece) Despina Papamichail 5–7, 7–5, [10–4]
