= 2022 WTA Argentina Open – Singles =

Singles
- 2022 WTA Argentina Open

Final
- Champion: (Hungary) Panna Udvardy
- Runner-up: (Montenegro) Danka Kovinić
- Score: 6–4, 6–1

Events
Singles	Doubles
← 2021 ·	WTA Argentine Open	· 2023 →

Anna Bondár was the reigning champion, but chose not to participate.

Third seed Panna Udvardy won the title, defeating Danka Kovinić in the final, 6–4, 6–1.

== Seeds ==
1. (Egypt) Mayar Sherif (withdrew)
2. (Montenegro) Danka Kovinić (final)
3. (Hungary) Panna Udvardy (champion)
4. (Austria) Julia Grabher (first round)
5. (Slovenia) Tamara Zidanšek (first round)
6. (Italy) Sara Errani (quarterfinals)
7. (Hungary) Réka Luca Jani (first round)
8. (Brazil) Laura Pigossi (quarterfinals)
9. (South Korea) Jang Su-jeong (first round)

== Draw ==
=== Key ===
- Q = Qualifier
- WC = Wild card
- LL = Lucky loser
- Alt = Alternate
- SE = Special exempt
- PR = Protected ranking
- ITF = ITF entry
- JE = Junior exempt
- w/o = Walkover
- r = Retired
- d = Defaulted
- SR = Special ranking

=== Finals ===
Semifinals
(Argentina) María Lourdes Carlé	2	6	4
3	(Hungary) Panna Udvardy	6	2	6
WC	(Argentina) Paula Ormaechea	0	1
2	(Montenegro) Danka Kovinić	6	6

Final
3	(Hungary) Panna Udvardy	6	6
2	(Montenegro) Danka Kovinić	4	1

=== Top half ===
First round
9	(South Korea) S-j Jang	4	6^{6}
(Argentina) ML Carlé	6	7^{8}
(France) H Tan	4	0^{r}
(United States) H Baptiste	6	1
(Andorra) V Jiménez Kasintseva	6	6
WC	(Argentina) C Di Genova	0	2
(United States) A Li	7	6
7	(Hungary) RL Jani	5	0
3	(Hungary) P Udvardy	6	6
(Mexico) M Zacarías	2	0
LL	(Czech Republic) S Bejlek	5	1
(United States) E Navarro	7	6
LL	(Turkey) İ Öz	6	4	3
(Ukraine) K Baindl	4	6	6
(France) C Burel	4	2
6	(Italy) S Errani	6	6

Second round
(Argentina) ML Carlé	6	6
(United States) H Baptiste	4	0
(Andorra) V Jiménez Kasintseva	3	6	6
(United States) A Li	6	1	2
3	(Hungary) P Udvardy	6	1	6
(United States) E Navarro	3	6	4
(Ukraine) K Baindl	3	3
6	(Italy) S Errani	6	6

Quarterfinals
(Argentina) ML Carlé	7	6
(Andorra) V Jiménez Kasintseva	5	2
3	(Hungary) P Udvardy	2	6	7^{7}
6	(Italy) S Errani	6	1	6^{4}

Semifinals
(Argentina) ML Carlé	2	6	4
3	(Hungary) P Udvardy	6	2	6

=== Bottom half ===
First round
8	(Brazil) L Pigossi	6	6
(Georgia (country)) E Gorgodze	3	4
(United States) C Dolehide	6	6^{2}	3
(France) L Jeanjean	2	7^{7}	6
(Czech Republic) B Fruhvirtová	6^{3}	1
Q	(Serbia) N Stevanović	7^{7}	6
WC	(Argentina) P Ormaechea	6	6
4	(Austria) J Grabher	3	2
5	(Slovenia) T Zidanšek	6	2	3
LL	D Astakhova	2	6	6
(Romania) I Bara	1	4
Q	D Shnaider	6	6
WC	(Argentina) N Podoroska	6	6
WC	(Argentina) S Sierra	4	4
Q	(Argentina) J Riera	1	6	1
2	(Montenegro) D Kovinić	6	2	6

Second round
8	(Brazil) L Pigossi	6	3	6
(France) L Jeanjean	4	6	4
Q	(Serbia) N Stevanović	5	2
WC	(Argentina) P Ormaechea	7	6
LL	D Astakhova	6	4	4
Q	D Shnaider	2	6	6
WC	(Argentina) N Podoroska	2	3
2	(Montenegro) D Kovinić	6	6

Quarterfinals
8	(Brazil) L Pigossi	2	4
WC	(Argentina) P Ormaechea	6	6
Q	D Shnaider	4	3
2	(Montenegro) D Kovinić	6	6

Semifinals
WC	(Argentina) P Ormaechea	0	1
2	(Montenegro) D Kovinić	6	6

== Qualifying ==
=== Seeds ===
1. Diana Shnaider (qualified)
2. (Czech Republic) Sára Bejlek (qualifying competition, lucky loser)
3. (Turkey) İpek Öz (qualifying competition, lucky loser)
4. (Serbia) Natalija Stevanović (qualified)

=== Qualifiers ===
1. Diana Shnaider
2. (Argentina) Julia Riera
3. (Japan) Yuki Naito
4. (Serbia) Natalija Stevanović

=== Lucky losers ===
1. (Czech Republic) Sára Bejlek
2. Darya Astakhova
3. (Turkey) İpek Öz

=== Draw ===
==== First qualifier ====
Qualifying competition
1	Diana Shnaider	6	6^{3}	6
	Darya Astakhova	3	7^{7}	1

==== Second qualifier ====
Qualifying competition
2	(Czech Republic) Sára Bejlek	5	4
WC	(Argentina) Julia Riera	7	6

==== Third qualifier ====
Qualifying competition
3	(Turkey) İpek Öz	6^{6}	3
	(Japan) Yuki Naito	7^{8}	6

==== Fourth qualifier ====
Qualifying competition
4	(Serbia) Natalija Stevanović	6	6
WC	(Argentina) Josefina Estévez	1	0
