= 2022 Billie Jean King Cup Europe/Africa Zone Group I – Pool A =

Subsection of tennis competition

Pool A of the 2022 Billie Jean King Cup Europe/Africa Zone Group I was one of two pools in the Europe/Africa zone of the 2020–21 Billie Jean King Cup. Five teams competed in a round robin competition, with the top teams and the bottom team proceeding to their respective sections of the play-offs: the top teams played for advancement to 2022 Billie Jean King Cup Play-offs.

== Standings ==
		HUN	SRB	TUR	DEN	EST	RR; W–L	Set; W–L	Game; W–L	Standings
3	Hungary		2–1	2–1	3–0	3–0	10–2	20–6 (77%)	146–79 (65%)	1
1	Serbia	1–2		2–1	2–1	2–1	7–5	16–12 (57%)	131–117 (53%)	2
5	Turkey	1–2	1–2		2–1	2–1	6–6	15–15 (50%)	138–140 (50%)	3
10	Denmark	0–3	1–2	1–2		2–1	4–8	9–19 (32%)	94–140 (40%)	4
7	Estonia	0–3	1–2	1–2	1–2		3–9	10–18 (36%)	103–136 (43%)	5

Standings are determined by: 1. number of wins; 2. number of matches; 3. in two-team ties, head-to-head records; 4. in three-team ties, (a) percentage of matches won (head-to-head records if two teams remain tied), then (b) percentage of sets won (head-to-head records if two teams remain tied), then (c) percentage of games won (head-to-head records if two teams remain tied), then (d) Billie Jean King Cup rankings.

== Round-robin ==
=== Serbia vs. Estonia ===
Serbia
2
Megasaray Tennis Academy, Antalya, Turkey
11 April 2022
Clay

Estonia
1

			1	2	3
1	(Serbia) (Estonia)	Dejana Radanović; Maileen Nuudi	3; 6	2; 6
2	(Serbia) (Estonia)	Aleksandra Krunić; Elena Malõgina	6; 1	3; 6	6; 4
3	(Serbia) (Estonia)	Aleksandra Krunić / Dejana Radanović; Elena Malõgina / Maileen Nuudi	6; 3	6; 2

=== Turkey vs. Denmark ===
Turkey
2
Megasaray Tennis Academy, Antalya, Turkey
11 April 2022
Clay

Denmark
1

			1	2	3
1	(Turkey) (Denmark)	Pemra Özgen; Johanne Svendsen	6; 2	6; 3
2	(Turkey) (Denmark)	İpek Öz; Sofia Samavati	7; 5	4; 6	6; 2
3	(Turkey) (Denmark)	Berfu Cengiz / İpek Öz; Rebecca Munk Mortensen / Johanne Svendsen	6; 2	4; 6	1; 6

=== Serbia vs. Denmark ===
Serbia
2
Megasaray Tennis Academy, Antalya, Turkey
12 April 2022
Clay

Denmark
1

			1	2	3
1	(Serbia) (Denmark)	Dejana Radanović; Johanne Svendsen	4; 6	1; 6
2	(Serbia) (Denmark)	Aleksandra Krunić; Sofia Samavati	6; 2	6; 1
3	(Serbia) (Denmark)	Aleksandra Krunić / Dejana Radanović; Rebecca Munk Mortensen / Johanne Svendsen	6; 2	6; 2

=== Hungary vs. Turkey ===
Hungary
2
Megasaray Tennis Academy, Antalya, Turkey
12 April 2022
Clay

Turkey
1

			1	2	3
1	(Hungary) (Turkey)	Panna Udvardy; Pemra Özgen	6; 1	6; 1
2	(Hungary) (Turkey)	Anna Bondár; İpek Öz	4; 6	4; 6
3	(Hungary) (Turkey)	Dalma Gálfi / Réka Luca Jani; Ayla Aksu / Berfu Cengiz	7; 5	5; 7	6; 3

=== Hungary vs. Denmark ===
Hungary
3
Megasaray Tennis Academy, Antalya, Turkey
13 April 2022
Clay

Denmark
0

			1	2	3
1	(Hungary) (Denmark)	Réka Luca Jani; Rebecca Munk Mortensen	6; 0	6; 1
2	(Hungary) (Denmark)	Panna Udvardy; Sofia Samavati	6; 1	6; 2
3	(Hungary) (Denmark)	Anna Bondár / Amarissa Kiara Tóth; Sofia Samavati / Johanne Svendsen	6; 2	6; 4

=== Turkey vs. Estonia ===
Turkey
2
Megasaray Tennis Academy, Antalya, Turkey
13 April 2022
Clay

Estonia
1

			1	2	3
1	(Turkey) (Estonia)	Pemra Özgen; Maileen Nuudi	4; 6	5; 7
2	(Turkey) (Estonia)	İpek Öz; Elena Malõgina	6; 1	6; 4
3	(Turkey) (Estonia)	Ayla Aksu / İpek Öz; Maileen Nuudi / Katriin Saar	2; 6	6; 2	6; 2

=== Serbia vs. Hungary ===
Serbia
1
Megasaray Tennis Academy, Antalya, Turkey
14 April 2022
Clay

Hungary
2

			1	2	3
1	(Serbia) (Hungary)	Lola Radivojević; Réka Luca Jani	1; 6	7^{7} 6^{2}	3; 6
2	(Serbia) (Hungary)	Aleksandra Krunić; Dalma Gálfi	6; 4	6; 2
3	(Serbia) (Hungary)	Aleksandra Krunić / Dejana Radanović; Anna Bondár / Panna Udvardy	3; 6	2; 6

=== Estonia vs. Denmark ===
Estonia
1
Megasaray Tennis Academy, Antalya, Turkey
14 April 2022
Clay

Denmark
2

			1	2	3
1	(Estonia) (Denmark)	Maileen Nuudi; Johanne Svendsen	6; 1	6; 4
2	(Estonia) (Denmark)	Elena Malõgina; Sofia Samavati	6; 1	2; 6	2; 6
3	(Estonia) (Denmark)	Maileen Nuudi / Katriin Saar; Sofia Samavati / Johanne Svendsen	6; 3	3; 6	4; 6

=== Serbia vs. Turkey ===
Serbia
2
Megasaray Tennis Academy, Antalya, Turkey
15 April 2022
Clay

Turkey
1

			1	2	3
1	(Serbia) (Turkey)	Lola Radivojević; Ayla Aksu	6; 4	6; 4
2	(Serbia) (Turkey)	Aleksandra Krunić; İpek Öz	6^{6} 7^{8}	6; 0	6; 3
3	(Serbia) (Turkey)	Elena Milovanović / Lola Radivojević; Berfu Cengiz / Zeynep Sönmez	3; 6	6; 4	3; 6

=== Hungary vs. Estonia ===
Hungary
3
Megasaray Tennis Academy, Antalya, Turkey
15 April 2022
Clay

Estonia
0

			1	2	3
1	(Hungary) (Estonia)	Panna Udvardy; Katriin Saar	6; 1	6; 3
2	(Hungary) (Estonia)	Anna Bondár; Maileen Nuudi	6; 1	6; 3
3	(Hungary) (Estonia)	Réka Luca Jani / Amarissa Kiara Tóth; Anet Angelika Koskel / Katriin Saar	6; 1	6; 3
