= 2022 Billie Jean King Cup Europe/Africa Zone Group I – play-offs =

Subsection of tennis competition

The play-offs of the 2022 Billie Jean King Cup Europe/Africa Zone Group I were the final stages of the Group I zonal competition involving teams from Europe/Africa. Using the positions determined in their pools, the eleven teams faced off to determine their placing in the 2022 Billie Jean King Cup Europe/Africa Zone Group I. The top three teams advanced to the 2022 Billie Jean King Cup play-offs, while the bottom two teams were relegated to Europe/Africa Zone Group II for 2023.

== Pool results ==
Placing	Pool A	Pool B
1	Hungary	Slovenia
2	Serbia	Croatia
3	Turkey	Austria
4	—	Bulgaria
5	Denmark	Sweden
6	Estonia	Georgia

== 1st place play-off ==
The first-placed teams of each pool played against each other in a head-to-head round. As both teams finished first in their pools, they automatically advance to the 2022 Billie Jean King Cup play-offs, but played-off for ranking points.

=== Hungary vs. Slovenia ===
Hungary
2
Megasaray Tennis Academy, Antalya, Turkey
16 April 2022
Clay

Slovenia
1

			1	2	3
1	(Hungary) (Slovenia)	Réka Luca Jani; Lara Smejkal	6; 2	6; 2
2	(Hungary) (Slovenia)	Anna Bondár; Živa Falkner	6; 4	6; 2
3	(Hungary) (Slovenia)	Réka Luca Jani / Amarissa Kiara Tóth; Kaja Juvan / Lara Smejkal				w/o

== Promotion play-off ==
The second-placed teams of each pool played against each other in a head-to-head round. The winner of the tie advanced to the 2022 Billie Jean King Cup play-offs, alongside Hungary and Slovenia.

=== Serbia vs. Croatia ===
Serbia
0
Megasaray Tennis Academy, Antalya, Turkey
16 April 2022
Clay

Croatia
2

			1	2	3
1	(Serbia) (Croatia)	Lola Radivojević; Petra Marčinko	1; 6	6; 2	0; 6
2	(Serbia) (Croatia)	Aleksandra Krunić; Petra Martić	6; 4	5; 7	4; 6
3	(Serbia) (Croatia)	Aleksandra Krunić / Dejana Radanović; Ana Konjuh / Donna Vekić				not played

== 5th place play-off ==
The third-placed teams of each pool played against each other in a head-to-head round to determine the nation finishing 5th.

=== Austria vs. Turkey ===
Austria
2
Megasaray Tennis Academy, Antalya, Turkey
16 April 2022
Clay

Turkey
0

			1	2	3
1	(Austria) (Turkey)	Melanie Klaffner; Zeynep Sönmez	6; 3	5; 7	6; 2
2	(Austria) (Turkey)	Barbara Haas; Berfu Cengiz	6; 4	6; 2
3	(Austria) (Turkey)	Barbara Haas / Melanie Klaffner; Berfu Cengiz / Zeynep Sönmez				not played

== Relegation play-offs ==
The second-last and last-placed teams of each pool played against one another in a head-to-head round. The losers of each tie were relegated to Europe/Africa Zone Group II in 2023.

=== Denmark vs. Georgia ===
Denmark
2
Megasaray Tennis Academy, Antalya, Turkey
16 April 2022
Clay

Georgia
1

			1	2	3
1	(Denmark) (Georgia (country))	Johanne Svendsen; Zoziya Kardava	6^{6} 7^{8}	1; 6
2	(Denmark) (Georgia (country))	Sofia Samavati; Mariam Bolkvadze	5; 0			retired
3	(Denmark) (Georgia (country))	Sofia Samavati / Johanne Svendsen; Tamari Gagoshidze / Oksana Kalashnikova	3; 6	6; 2	6; 1

=== Estonia vs. Sweden ===
Estonia
1
Megasaray Tennis Academy, Antalya, Turkey
16 April 2022
Clay

Sweden
2

			1	2	3
1	(Estonia) (Sweden)	Maileen Nuudi; Jacqueline Cabaj Awad	6; 2	6; 1
2	(Estonia) (Sweden)	Elena Malõgina; Caijsa Hennemann	1; 6	0; 6
3	(Estonia) (Sweden)	Maileen Nuudi / Katriin Saar; Jacqueline Cabaj Awad / Caijsa Hennemann	2; 6	7^{7} 6^{2}	4; 6

== Final placements ==
Placing	Teams	
Promoted/First	Hungary	
Promoted/Second	Slovenia	
Promoted/Third	Croatia	
Promoted/Fourth	Serbia	
Fifth	Austria	
Sixth	Turkey	
Seventh	Bulgaria	
Eighth	Denmark	Sweden
Relegated/Tenth	Estonia	Georgia

- Hungary, Slovenia, Croatia, and Serbia} were promoted to the 2022 Billie Jean King Cup play-offs.
  - Serbia promotion was based on world ranking after Russia and Belarus were disqualified over violations of the Olympic Truce.
- Estonia and Georgia were relegated to Europe/Africa Zone Group II in 2023.
