= 2021 WTA Argentina Open – Doubles =

Doubles
- 2021 WTA Argentina Open

Final
- Champions: (Romania) Irina Bara (Georgia (country)) Ekaterine Gorgodze
- Runners-up: (Argentina) María Lourdes Carlé (Greece) Despina Papamichail
- Score: 5–7, 7–5, [10–4]

Events
Singles	Doubles
← 1987 ·	WTA Argentine Open	· 2022 →

This was the first edition of the tournament since 1987.

Irina Bara and Ekaterine Gorgodze won the title, defeating María Lourdes Carlé and Despina Papamichail in the final, 5–7, 7–5, [10–4].

== Seeds ==
1. (Romania) Irina Bara / (Georgia (country)) Ekaterine Gorgodze (champions)
2. (Brazil) Carolina Alves / (Brazil) Laura Pigossi (first round)
3. (Hungary) Anna Bondár / (Hungary) Panna Udvardy (semifinals)
4. (Chile) Bárbara Gatica / (Brazil) Rebeca Pereira (quarterfinals)

== Draw ==
=== Key ===
- Q = Qualifier
- WC = Wild card
- LL = Lucky loser
- Alt = Alternate
- SE = Special exempt
- PR = Protected ranking
- ITF = ITF entry
- JE = Junior exempt
- w/o = Walkover
- r = Retired
- d = Defaulted
- SR = Special ranking

=== Draw ===
First round
1	(Romania) I Bara (Georgia (country)) E Gorgodze	6	6
WC	(Argentina) M Capurro Taborda (Argentina) L Moyano	4	3
(Argentina) V Bosio (Argentina) J Estable	1	3
(Germany) K Gerlach (Chile) D Seguel	6	6
3	(Hungary) A Bondár (Hungary) P Udvardy	6	6
(Germany) J Jebawy (Argentina) J Ortenzi	2	1
(Andorra) V Jiménez Kasintseva (Argentina) S Sierra	4	3
(Paraguay) V Cepede Royg (United States) K Christian	6	6
(Mexico) AS Sánchez (China) X You	3	3
(Argentina) ML Carlé (Greece) D Papamichail	6	6
WC	(Argentina) M Bulbarella (Argentina) MV Burstein	2	2
4	(Chile) B Gatica (Brazil) R Pereira	6	6
(France) D Parry (Egypt) M Sherif	6	6
WC	(Argentina) M Roldán Santander (Argentina) M Sarno	2	1
(Spain) I Burillo Escorihuela (Spain) A Lázaro García	6	6
2	(Brazil) C Alves (Brazil) L Pigossi	4	2

Quarterfinals
1	(Romania) I Bara (Georgia (country)) E Gorgodze	2	6	[10]
(Germany) K Gerlach (Chile) D Seguel	6	1	[6]
3	(Hungary) A Bondár (Hungary) P Udvardy	6	5	[10]
(Paraguay) V Cepede Royg (United States) K Christian	0	7	[8]
(Argentina) ML Carlé (Greece) D Papamichail	7^{7}	6
4	(Chile) B Gatica (Brazil) R Pereira	6^{5}	2
(France) D Parry (Egypt) M Sherif	1^{r}
(Spain) I Burillo Escorihuela (Spain) A Lázaro García	1

Semifinals
1	(Romania) I Bara (Georgia (country)) E Gorgodze	6	7^{7}
3	(Hungary) A Bondár (Hungary) P Udvardy	4	6^{3}
(Argentina) ML Carlé (Greece) D Papamichail	6	3
(Spain) I Burillo Escorihuela (Spain) A Lázaro García	4	1^{r}

Final
1	(Romania) I Bara (Georgia (country)) E Gorgodze	5	7	[10]
(Argentina) ML Carlé (Greece) D Papamichail	7	5	[4]
