= 2022 WTA Argentina Open =

Argentina Tennis tournament

- Date: 14–20 November 2022
- Edition: 2nd
- Category: WTA 125
- Prize money: $115,000
- Surface: Clay
- Location: Buenos Aires, Argentina
- Venue: Buenos Aires Lawn Tennis Club

Champions

Singles
- (Hungary) Panna Udvardy

Doubles
- (Romania) Irina Bara / (Italy) Sara Errani
← 2021 ·	WTA Argentine Open	· 2023 →

The 2022 WTA Argentina Open was a professional tennis tournament played on outdoor clay courts. It was the second edition of the tournament which is also part of the 2022 WTA 125 tournaments. It took place at the Buenos Aires Lawn Tennis Club in Buenos Aires, Argentina between 14 and 20 November 2022.

== Singles entrants ==
=== Seeds ===
Country	Player	Rank^{1}	Seed
~~EGY~~	~~Mayar Sherif~~	~~63~~	~~1~~
MNE	Danka Kovinić	79	2
HUN	Panna Udvardy	83	3
AUT	Julia Grabher	84	4
SLO	Tamara Zidanšek	87	5
ITA	Sara Errani	109	6
HUN	Réka Luca Jani	111	7
BRA	Laura Pigossi	114	8
KOR	Jang Su-jeong	115	9

- ^{1} Rankings are as of 7 November 2022.

=== Other entrants ===
The following players received wildcards into the singles main draw:

- (Argentina) Chiara Di Genova
- (Argentina) Paula Ormaechea
- (Argentina) Nadia Podoroska
- (Argentina) Solana Sierra

The following players received entry from the qualifying draw:

- ~~(Japan) Yuki Naito~~
- (Argentina) Julia Riera
- Diana Shnaider
- (Serbia) Natalija Stevanović

The following players received entry into the main draw as lucky losers:

- Darya Astakhova
- (Czech Republic) Sára Bejlek
- (Turkey) İpek Öz

=== Withdrawals ===
Before the tournament

- (Brazil) Carolina Alves → replaced by (Czech Republic) Sára Bejlek
- (Romania) Gabriela Lee → replaced by (Georgia (country)) Ekaterine Gorgodze
- (United States) Elizabeth Mandlik → replaced by (Romania) Irina Bara
- (Japan) Yuki Naito → replaced by (Turkey) İpek Öz
- (Colombia) Camila Osorio → replaced by (Argentina) María Lourdes Carlé
- (France) Chloé Paquet → replaced by (Czech Republic) Brenda Fruhvirtová
- (Spain) Nuria Párrizas Díaz → replaced by (Mexico) Marcela Zacarías
- (Egypt) Mayar Sherif → replaced by Darya Astakhova

== Doubles entrants ==
=== Seeds ===
Country	Player	Country	Player	Rank^{1}	Seed
HUN	Tímea Babos	GEO	Ekaterine Gorgodze	172	1
BRA	Ingrid Gamarra Martins	BRA	Luisa Stefani	187	2
VEN	Andrea Gámiz	NED	Eva Vedder	217	3
USA	Jessie Aney	USA	Ingrid Neel	229	4

- ^{1} Rankings as of 7 November 2022.

=== Other entrants ===
The following pair received a wildcard into the doubles main draw:

- (Argentina) Martina Capurro Taborda / (Argentina) Julia Riera

== Champions ==
=== Singles ===
- (Hungary) Panna Udvardy def. (Montenegro) Danka Kovinić 6–4, 6–1

=== Doubles ===
- (Romania) Irina Bara / (Italy) Sara Errani def. (South Korea) Jang Su-jeong / (China) You Xiaodi 6–1, 7–5
