= 2018 Fed Cup Europe/Africa Zone Group I – Pool C =

Subsection of tennis competition

Pool C of the 2018 Fed Cup Europe/Africa Zone Group I was one of four pools in the Europe/Africa zone of the 2018 Fed Cup. Four teams competed in a round robin competition, with the top team and the bottom team proceeding to their respective sections of the play-offs: the top team played for advancement to the World Group II Play-offs, while the bottom team faced potential relegation to Group II.

== Standings ==
		HUN	CRO	SLO	SWE	RR; W–L	Set; W–L	Game; W–L	Standings
5	Hungary		3–0	2–1	1–2	2–1	13–8 (62%)	105–88 (54%)	1
3	Croatia	0–3		2–1	2–1	2–1	10–12 (45%)	92–107 (46%)	2
14	Slovenia	1–2	1–2		3–0	1–2	11–10 (52%)	99–90 (52%)	3
13	Sweden	2–1	1–2	0–3		1–2	9–13 (41%)	100–111 (47%)	4

Standings are determined by: 1. number of wins; 2. number of matches; 3. in two-team ties, head-to-head records; 4. in three-team ties, (a) percentage of sets won (head-to-head records if two teams remain tied), then (b) percentage of games won (head-to-head records if two teams remain tied), then (c) Fed Cup rankings.

== Round-robin ==
=== Croatia vs. Slovenia ===
Croatia
2
Tallink Tennis Centre, Tallinn, Estonia
7 February
Hard (indoors)

Slovenia
1

			1	2	3
1	(Croatia) (Slovenia)	Lea Bošković; Kaja Juvan	6; 2	4; 6	6; 2
2	(Croatia) (Slovenia)	Tena Lukas; Tamara Zidanšek	3; 6	1; 6
3	(Croatia) (Slovenia)	Darija Jurak / Tena Lukas; Nina Potočnik / Tamara Zidanšek	6; 1	6; 3

=== Hungary vs. Sweden ===
Hungary
1
Tallink Tennis Centre, Tallinn, Estonia
7 February
Hard (indoors)

Sweden
2

			1	2	3
1	(Hungary) (Sweden)	Réka Luca Jani; Cornelia Lister	2; 6	6; 0	6^{6} 7^{8}
2	(Hungary) (Sweden)	Dalma Gálfi; Rebecca Peterson	3; 6	2; 6
3	(Hungary) (Sweden)	Dalma Gálfi / Fanny Stollár; Cornelia Lister / Rebecca Peterson	7^{7} 6^{4}	6; 3

=== Croatia vs. Sweden ===
Croatia
2
Tallink Tennis Centre, Tallinn, Estonia
8 February
Hard (indoors)

Sweden
1

			1	2	3
1	(Croatia) (Sweden)	Lea Bošković; Cornelia Lister	6; 4	3; 6	7; 5
2	(Croatia) (Sweden)	Tena Lukas; Rebecca Peterson	2; 6	1; 6
3	(Croatia) (Sweden)	Darija Jurak / Tena Lukas; Cornelia Lister / Jacqueline Cabaj Awad	7; 5	7^{7} 6^{5}

=== Hungary vs. Slovenia ===
Hungary
2
Tallink Tennis Centre, Tallinn, Estonia
8 February
Hard (indoors)

Slovenia
1

			1	2	3
1	(Hungary) (Slovenia)	Anna Bondár; Nina Potočnik	4; 6	2; 6
2	(Hungary) (Slovenia)	Fanny Stollár; Tamara Zidanšek	6; 4	6; 4
3	(Hungary) (Slovenia)	Dalma Gálfi / Fanny Stollár; Kaja Juvan / Tamara Zidanšek	6; 4	6; 3

=== Croatia vs. Hungary ===
Croatia
0
Tallink Tennis Centre, Tallinn, Estonia
9 February
Hard (indoors)

Hungary
3

			1	2	3
1	(Croatia) (Hungary)	Lea Bošković; Dalma Gálfi	2; 6	6; 2	5; 7
2	(Croatia) (Hungary)	Tena Lukas; Fanny Stollár	1; 6	6; 3	5; 7
3	(Croatia) (Hungary)	Darija Jurak / Tena Lukas; Anna Bondár / Réka Luca Jani	2; 3			retired

=== Slovenia vs. Sweden ===
Slovenia
3
Tallink Tennis Centre, Tallinn, Estonia
9 February
Hard (indoors)

Sweden
0

			1	2	3
1	(Slovenia) (Sweden)	Kaja Juvan; Jacqueline Cabaj Awad	6; 1	6; 3
2	(Slovenia) (Sweden)	Tamara Zidanšek; Rebecca Peterson	4; 6	6; 4	6; 2
3	(Slovenia) (Sweden)	Kaja Juvan / Nika Radišič; Mirjam Björklund / Jacqueline Cabaj Awad	6; 3	6^{5} 7^{7}	6; 2
