= 2021 WTA Argentina Open – Singles =

Singles
- 2021 WTA Argentina Open

Final
- Champion: (Hungary) Anna Bondár
- Runner-up: (France) Diane Parry
- Score: 6–3, 6–3

Events
Singles	Doubles
← 1987 ·	WTA Argentine Open	· 2022 →

This was the first edition of the tournament since 1987.

Anna Bondár won the title, defeating Diane Parry in the final, 6–3, 6–3.

== Seeds ==
1. (Egypt) Mayar Sherif (semifinals)
2. (Brazil) Beatriz Haddad Maia (quarterfinals)
3. (Hungary) Anna Bondár (champion)
4. (Romania) Irina Bara (quarterfinals)
5. (Hungary) Panna Udvardy (semifinals)
6. (Georgia (country)) Ekaterine Gorgodze (quarterfinals)
7. (France) Diane Parry (final)
8. (Greece) Despina Papamichail (quarterfinals)

== Draw ==
=== Key ===
- Q = Qualifier
- WC = Wild card
- LL = Lucky loser
- Alt = Alternate
- ITF = ITF entry
- PR = Protected ranking
- SR = Special ranking
- SE = Special exempt
- JE = Junior exempt
- JR = Junior Accelerator Programme entrant
- CO = College Accelerator Programme entrant
- NG = Next Gen Accelerator Program entrant
- w/o = Walkover
- r = Retired
- d = Defaulted

=== Finals ===
Semifinals
1	(Egypt) Mayar Sherif	6	3	3
3	(Hungary) Anna Bondár	4	6	6
5	(Hungary) Panna Udvardy	3	6^{3}
7	(France) Diane Parry	6	7^{7}

Final
3	(Hungary) Anna Bondár	6	6
7	(France) Diane Parry	3	3

=== Top half ===
First round
1	(Egypt) M Sherif	6	3	7^{7}
(Spain) A Lázaro García	4	6	6^{2}
(Chile) B Gatica	6	6^{2}	4
(Germany) K Gerlach	1	7^{7}	6
(Germany) J Jebawy	1	1
(China) X You	6	6
(Argentina) V Bosio	2	3
6	(Georgia (country)) E Gorgodze	6	6
3	(Hungary) A Bondár	6	6
(Spain) I Burillo Escorihuela	0	0
(Mexico) AS Sánchez	3	3
(Andorra) V Jiménez Kasintseva	6	6
Q	(Argentina) Sol Faga	2	4
WC	(Argentina) S Sierra	6	6
(Argentina) ML Carlé	6	2	2
8	(Greece) D Papamichail	3	6	6

Second round
1	(Egypt) M Sherif	6	6
(Germany) K Gerlach	3	2
(China) X You	6	3	1
6	(Georgia (country)) E Gorgodze	1	6	6
3	(Hungary) A Bondár	6	7
(Andorra) V Jiménez Kasintseva	4	5
WC	(Argentina) S Sierra	6^{6}	4
8	(Greece) D Papamichail	7^{8}	6

Quarterfinals
1	(Egypt) M Sherif	6	6
6	(Georgia (country)) E Gorgodze	1	4
3	(Hungary) A Bondár	6	7
8	(Greece) D Papamichail	4	5

Semifinals
1	(Egypt) M Sherif	6	3	3
3	(Hungary) A Bondár	4	6	6

=== Bottom half ===
First round
5	(Hungary) P Udvardy	6	6
WC	(Argentina) Julieta Estable	3	2
(Brazil) L Pigossi	6	2	6
(Paraguay) V Cepede Royg	4	6	4
Q	(Argentina) María Victoria Burstein	0	0
(Brazil) C Alves	6	6
Q	(Argentina) M Capurro Taborda	3	1
4	(Romania) I Bara	6	6
7	(France) D Parry	6	6
Q	(Argentina) Luciana Moyano	0	1
WC	(Argentina) S Luini	2	3
(Russia) E Avanesyan	6	6
(Chile) D Seguel	7	6
WC	(Argentina) J Ortenzi	5	1
(Colombia) E Arango	1	2
2	(Brazil) B Haddad Maia	6	6

Second round
5	(Hungary) P Udvardy	5	7^{7}	7
(Brazil) L Pigossi	7	6^{4}	5
(Brazil) C Alves	5	3
4	(Romania) I Bara	7	6
7	(France) D Parry	4	6	6
(Russia) E Avanesyan	6	2	1
(Chile) D Seguel	2	4
2	(Brazil) B Haddad Maia	6	6

Quarterfinals
5	(Hungary) P Udvardy	6	1	6
4	(Romania) I Bara	1	6	1
7	(France) D Parry	4	6	6
2	(Brazil) B Haddad Maia	6	4	4

Semifinals
5	(Hungary) P Udvardy	3	6^{3}
7	(France) D Parry	6	7^{7}

== Qualifying ==
=== Seeds ===
1. (Argentina) Martina Capurro Taborda (qualified)
2. (Brazil) Rebeca Pereira (qualifying competition)

=== Qualifiers ===
1. (Argentina) Martina Capurro Taborda
2. (Argentina) Sol Faga
3. (Argentina) Luciana Moyano
4. (Argentina) María Victoria Burstein

=== Qualifying draw ===
==== First qualifier ====
Qualifying competition
1	(Argentina) Martina Capurro Taborda	6	6
WC	(Argentina) Martina Roldán Santander	1	2

==== Second qualifier ====
Qualifying competition
2	(Brazil) Rebeca Pereira	4	1
WC	(Argentina) Sol Faga	6	6

==== Third qualifier ====
Qualifying competition
WC	(Argentina) Merlina Sarno	3	5
WC	(Argentina) Luciana Moyano	6	7

==== Fourth qualifier ====
Qualifying competition
WC	(Argentina) Lara Díaz Zayas	2	3
WC	(Argentina) María Victoria Burstein	6	6
