= Dalma Gálfi =

Hungarian tennis player (born 1998)

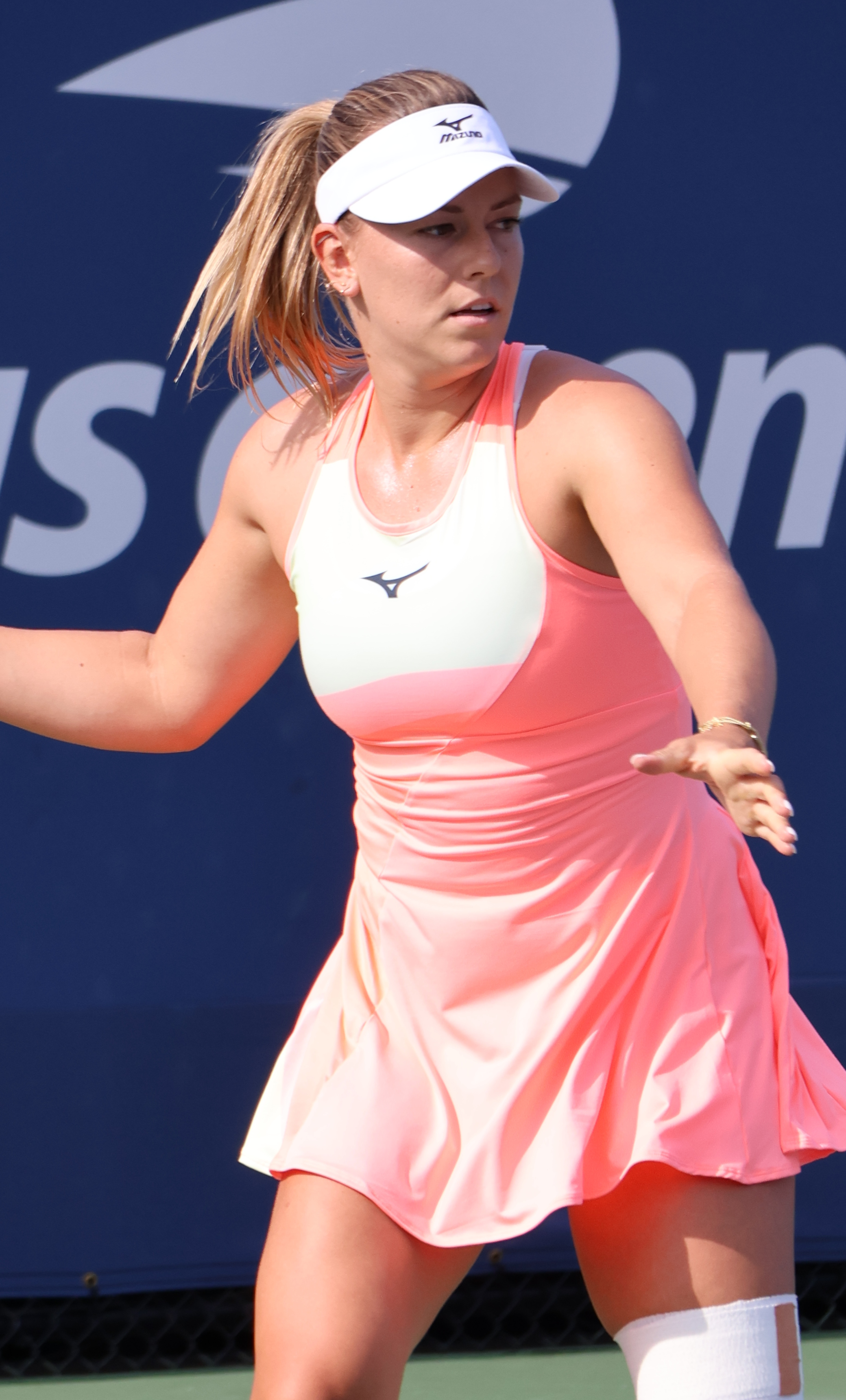
- Gálfi at the 2023 US Open
- Full name: Dalma Rebeka Gálfi
- Country (sports): Hungary
- Born: 13 August 1998 (age 28) Balatonfüred, Hungary
- Height: 1.78 m (5 ft 10 in)
- Coach: Bastien Fazincani (Jan 2019–)
- Prize money: $2,713,583

Singles
- Career record: 358–266
- Career titles: 2 WTA 125, 9 ITF
- Highest ranking: No. 79 (12 September 2022)
- Current ranking: No. 157 (31 August 2026)

Grand Slam singles results
- Australian Open: 1R (2023, 2026)
- French Open: 1R (2022, 2023, 2024, 2026)
- Wimbledon: 3R (2023, 2025)
- US Open: 3R (2022)

Doubles
- Career record: 134–109
- Career titles: 10 ITF
- Highest ranking: No. 126 (19 September 2022)

Grand Slam doubles results
- Australian Open: 1R (2023)
- French Open: 2R (2022, 2023)
- Wimbledon: 1R (2022)
- US Open: 3R (2022)

Team competitions
- Fed Cup: 15–14
- Last updated on: 10 September 2026.

Dalma Rebeka Gálfi (born 13 August 1998) is a Hungarian professional tennis player. On 12 September 2022, she reached a career-high singles ranking of world No. 79. On 19 September 2022, she peaked at No. 126 in the WTA doubles rankings. Gálfi has won two singles titles on the WTA Challenger Tour as well as nine singles and ten doubles titles on the ITF Women's Circuit.

== Early life ==
Gálfi began playing tennis at the age of five. Her father had two tennis courts, and he taught her how to play tennis.

== Career ==
=== 2013: WTA Tour debut ===
Gálfi was given a wildcard for the Budapest Grand Prix, where she made her WTA Tour main-draw debut alongside Lilla Barzó in doubles, only to lose to the 2011 French Open champions Andrea Hlaváčková and Lucie Hradecká.

=== 2014-2015: Junior ITF and US Open champion ===
In December, Gálfi was pronounced ITF Junior Champion. In that year, she won the girls' singles title at the US Open, and the girls' doubles title (with Fanny Stollár) at Wimbledon.

==== Juniors Grand Slam performance ====
Singles:

- Australian Open: SF (2015)
- French Open: 2R (2015)
- Wimbledon: 2R (2014)
- US Open: W (2015)

Doubles:

- Australian Open: 2R (2015)
- French Open: QF (2015)
- Wimbledon: W (2015)
- US Open: 2R (2014)

=== 2021: Major debut, WTA Tour semifinal ===
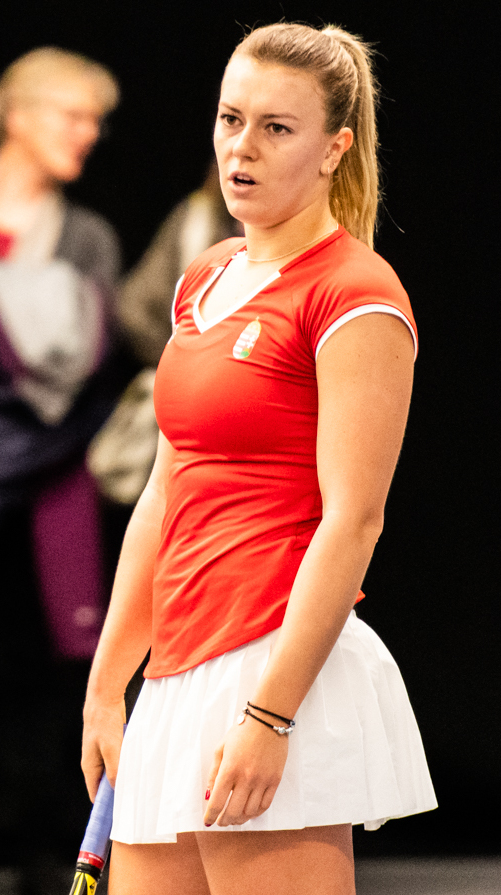
Gálfi in 2021

In July 2021, she reached her first WTA Tour semifinal at the Budapest Grand Prix as a wildcard.

Six years after winning the junior title at the US Open in 2015, Gálfi qualified, after eight attempts, for the first time into the main draw of a Grand Slam tournament at the US Open.

=== 2022: WTA 1000 debut, US Open third round, top 80 ===
Gálfi reached the top 100 on 4 April 2022, at No. 97 after recording her first win the WTA 1000 level in Miami. After winning her first ITF Circuit grass-court title, the Ilkley Trophy in June, she set a new career-high of world No. 81.

She was runner-up at the WTA 125 Contrexéville Open in July, losing to Sara Errani in three sets in the final.

Gálfi improved to a new best ranking of No. 79 on 12 September, after reaching the third round at a major for the first time in her career, at the US Open, where she lost to 18th seed Veronika Kudermetova. At the same tournament, she also advanced to the third round in doubles, partnering Bernarda Pera.

=== 2023: Australian Open debut, Wimbledon third round ===
At the Linz Open, Gálfi reached the quarterfinals as a qualifier, defeating seventh seed Bernarda Pera and wildcard Eva Lys, before retiring while trailing in the first set of her last eight march against Markéta Vondroušová.

At the Indian Wells Open, she qualified as a lucky loser and defeated world No. 31, Danielle Collins, for her second career win at this level. She lost in the second round to fifth seed Caroline Garcia in three sets.

At Wimbledon, Gálfi appeared in the third round for the first time at this major, after defeating Linda Nosková and Jule Niemeier. Her run was ended by 21st seed Ekaterina Alexandrova.

=== 2024: WTA Tour semifinal on grass ===
In Hua Hin, Thailand, Gálfi reached her third career quarterfinal as a qualifier, defeating wildcard Ajla Tomljanović and fifth seed Wang Xiyu. She lost in the last eight to eventual champion Diana Shnaider.

At the Rosmalen Open, she reached her first grass-court semifinal and first since Budapest 2021, as a qualifier defeating Arantxa Rus, fifth seed Veronika Kudermetova and Aleksandra Krunić. She lost her semifinal match to Bianca Andreescu in straight sets. Gálfi made it through qualifying at Wimbledon, going on to reach the second-round where she lost to 11th seed Danielle Collins.

=== 2025: First WTA 125 titles ===
Gálfi won her first WTA 125 title at the Oeiras Ladies Open in April, defeating second seed Katie Volynets in the final. The following week, she claimed the WTA 125 Catalonia Open winning the final against Rebeka Masarova, in straight sets.

In July at Wimbledon, Gálfi recorded wins over wildcard entrant Harriet Dart and 21st seed Beatriz Haddad Maia to reach the third round, where she lost to 13th seed Amanda Anisimova in three sets.

At the Hamburg Open, she defeated qualifier Aleksandra Krunić and wildcard entrant Nastasja Schunk to make it through to her first clay-court quarterfinal since 2021, at which point her run was ended by second seed Dayana Yastremska.

=== 2026: First WTA 1000 third round ===
Having qualified for the main draw at the Madrid Open, wins over Ajla Tomljanović and 22nd seed Anna Kalinskaya saw Gálfi reach the third round of a WTA 1000 tournament for the first time, before losing to ninth seed Mirra Andreeva.

== Performance timelines ==
Key
W	F	SF	QF	#R	RR	Q#	P#	DNQ	A	Z#	PO	G	S	B	NMS	NTI	P	NH

(W) winner; (F) finalist; (SF) semifinalist; (QF) quarterfinalist; (#R) rounds 4, 3, 2, 1; (RR) round-robin stage; (Q#) qualification round; (P#) preliminary round; (DNQ) did not qualify; (A) absent; (Z#) Davis/Fed Cup Zonal Group (with number indication) or (PO) play-off; (G) gold, (S) silver or (B) bronze Olympic/Paralympic medal; (NMS) not a Masters tournament; (NTI) not a Tier I tournament; (P) postponed; (NH) not held; (SR) strike rate (events won / competed); (W–L) win–loss record.
To avoid confusion and double counting, these charts are updated at the conclusion of a tournament or when the player's participation has ended.

Only main-draw results in WTA Tour, Grand Slam tournaments, Billie Jean King Cup, Hopman Cup, United Cup and Olympic Games are included in win–loss records.

=== Singles ===
Current through the 2026 Italian Open.

Tournament	2015	2016	2017	2018	2019	2020	2021	2022	2023	2024	2025	2026	SR	W–L	Win%
Grand Slam tournaments
Australian Open	A	A	Q2	A	A	A	Q1	Q2	1R	Q2	Q1	1R	0 / 2	0–2	0%
French Open	A	A	Q1	A	A	Q3	Q1	1R	1R	1R	Q2	1R	0 / 4	0–4	0%
Wimbledon	A	A	Q1	A	A	NH	Q1	2R	3R	2R	3R	1R	0 / 5	6–5	55%
US Open	A	A	Q1	A	A	A	1R	3R	Q2	Q1	1R	Q1	0 / 3	2–3	40%
Win–loss	0–0	0–0	0–0	0–0	0–0	0–0	0–1	3–3	2–3	1–2	2–2	0–3	0 / 14	8–14	36%
National representation
Billie Jean King Cup (Note: Formerly known as Fed Cup until 2020.)	Z1	Z1	Z1	Z1	Z1	A (Note: Edition is split into the two years due to COVID-19.)		PO	PO	A	A		0 / 0	6–9	40%
WTA 1000 tournaments
Qatar Open (Note: The first Premier 5 event of the year has switched back and forth between the Dubai Tennis Championships and the Qatar Ladies Open from 2009 until 2025. Dubai was classified as a Premier 5 event from 2009 to 2011 before being succeeded by Doha for the 2012–2014 period. In 2015, Dubai regained its Premier 5 status while Doha was demoted to Premier status. The Premier 5 tournaments were reclassified as WTA 1000 tournaments in 2021.)	A	A	A	A	A	A	A	A	A	A	A	A	0 / 0	0–0	–
Dubai	A	A	A	A	A	A	A	A	A	A	A	A	0 / 0	0–0	–
Indian Wells Open	A	A	A	A	A	NH	A	1R	2R	Q1	A	1R	0 / 3	1–3	25%
Miami Open	A	A	A	A	A	NH	A	A	2R	1R	A	1R	0 / 3	1–3	25%
Madrid Open	A	A	A	A	A	NH	A	Q1	1R	A	A	3R	0 / 2	2–2	50%
Italian Open	A	A	A	A	A	A	A	A	Q2	Q1	A	1R	0 / 1	0–1	0%
Canadian Open	A	A	A	A	A	NH	A	A	A	A	A	A	0 / 0	0–0	–
Cincinnati Open	A	A	A	A	A	A	A	A	A	A	Q2	A	0 / 0	0–0	–
Wuhan Open	A	A	A	A	A	not held				A	A		0 / 0	0–0	–
China Open	A	A	A	A	A	not held			A	1R	1R		0 / 2	0–2	0%
Win–loss	0–0	0–0	0–0	0–0	0–0	0–0	0–0	1–2	1–3	0–1	0–1	2–4	0 / 11	4–11	27%
Career statistics
	2015	2016	2017	2018	2019	2020	2021	2022	2023	2024	2025	2026	SR	W–L	Win%
Tournaments	0 (Note: During the season, she did not play in the main draw of any tour-level tournaments. However, she played in the Billie Jean King Cup, which is not counted as a played tournament but matches count.)	1	1	0	0	0	2	10	12	6	6	10	Career total: 48		
Titles	0	0	0	0	0	0	0	0	0	0	0	0	Career total: 0		
Finals	0	0	0	0	0	0	0	0	0	0	0	0	Career total: 0		
Overall win–loss	0–1	0–2	1–2	1–2	2–1	0–0	3–2	7–12	7–13	6–6	5–6	4–10	0 / 48	36–57	39%
Win %	0%	0%	33%	33%	67%	–	60%	37%	35%	50%	45%	29%	Career total: 39%		
Year-end ranking (Note: 2014: WTA ranking–1073.)	313	272	170	296	252	221	122	85	136	144	96		$2,481,718		

=== Doubles ===
Current through the 2023 French Open.

Tournament	2013	2014	2015	2016	2017	2018	2019	2020	2021	2022	2023	SR	W–L	Win%
Grand Slam tournaments
Australian Open	A	A	A	A	A	A	A	A	A	A	1R	0 / 1	0–1	0%
French Open	A	A	A	A	A	A	A	A	A	2R	2R	0 / 2	2–2	50%
Wimbledon	A	A	A	A	A	A	A	NH	A	1R	A	0 / 1	0–1	0%
US Open	A	A	A	A	A	A	A	A	A	3R	A	0 / 1	2–1	67%
Win–loss	0–0	0–0	0–0	0–0	0–0	0–0	0–0	0–0	0–0	3–3	1–2	0 / 5	4–5	44%
National representation
Billie Jean King Cup	A	A	Z1	Z1	Z1	Z1	Z1	A		PO	PO	0 / 0	8–4	67%
Career statistics
Tournaments	1	0	0	0	0	1	1	0	2	6	4	Career total: 15		
Titles	0	0	0	0	0	0	0	0	0	0	0	Career total: 0		
Finals	0	0	0	0	0	0	0	0	0	0	0	Career total: 0		
Overall win–loss	0–1	0–0	0–0	1–2	0–1	2–1	1–1	0–0	2–2	6–6	4–5	0 / 15	16–19	46%
Year-end ranking	n/a	933	430	266	406	240	229	175	191	139	387			

== WTA 125 finals ==
=== Singles: 4 (2 titles, 2 runner-ups) ===
Result	W–L	Date	Tournament	Surface	Opponent	Score
Loss	0–1	Jul 2022	Contrexéville Open, France	Clay	(Italy) Sara Errani	4–6, 6–1, 6–7^{(4–7)}
Loss	0–2	Apr 2025	Solgironès Open, Spain	Clay	(Latvia) Darja Semeņistaja	7–5, 0–6, 4–6
Win	1–2	Apr 2025	Oeiras Ladies Open, Portugal	Clay	(United States) Katie Volynets	4–6, 6–1, 6–2
Win	2–2	May 2025	Catalonia Open, Spain	Clay	(Switzerland) Rebeka Masarova	6–3, 6–0

=== Doubles: 1 (runner-up) ===
Result	Date	Tournament	Surface	Partner	Opponents	Score
Loss	Apr 2024	Solgironès Open, Spain	Clay	(Hungary) Tímea Babos	(Czech Republic) Miriam Kolodziejová (Czech Republic) Anna Sisková	walkover

== ITF Circuit finals ==
=== Singles: 15 (9 titles, 6 runner-ups) ===
Legend $100,000 tournaments (1–2) $80,000 tournaments (0–1) $60,000 tournaments (0–1) $25,000 tournaments (4–2) $10/15,000 tournaments (4–0)	Finals by surface Hard (7–1) Clay (1–5) Grass (1–0)

Result	W–L	Date	Tournament	Tier	Surface	Opponent	Score
Win	1–0	Nov 2014	ITF Heraklion, Greece	10,000	Hard	(Austria) Julia Grabher	6–3, 6–0
Win	2–0	Nov 2014	ITF Heraklion, Greece	10,000	Hard	(Greece) Valentini Grammatikopoulou	6–2, 4–6, 7–6^{(7–4)}
Win	3–0	Mar 2015	ITF Solarino, Italy	10,000	Hard	(Canada) Gloria Liang	6–4, 7–6^{(7–0)}
Win	4–0	Sep 2015	ITF Tweed Heads, Australia	15,000	Hard	(Australia) Storm Sanders	6–2, 3–6, 6–1
Win	5–0	Oct 2015	ITF Cairns, Australia	25,000	Hard	(Australia) Olivia Tjandramulia	6–4, 6–7^{(9–11)}, 6–1
Win	6–0	Oct 2016	ITF Toowoomba, Australia	25,000	Hard	(United Kingdom) Katy Dunne	6–2, 6–4
Win	7–0	Nov 2016	ITF Chenzhou, China	25,000	Hard	(Japan) Riko Sawayanagi	6–0, 6–4
Loss	7–1	Nov 2016	ITF Tokyo Open, Japan	100,000	Hard	(China) Zhang Shuai	6–4, 6–7^{(2–7)}, 2–6
Loss	7–2	May 2019	Solgironès Open, Spain	W60+H	Clay	(China) Wang Xiyu	6–4, 3–6, 2–6
Loss	7–3	Mar 2020	ITF Antalya, Turkey	W25	Clay	(Egypt) Mayar Sherif	4–6, 3–6
Loss	7–4	May 2021	Prague Open, Czech Republic	W25	Clay	(Germany) Jule Niemeier	4–6, 2–6
Win	8–4	Jun 2021	ITF Denain, France	W25	Clay	(Argentina) Paula Ormaechea	5–7, 6–2, 6–4
Loss	8–5	Jul 2021	Contrexéville Open, France	W100	Clay	(Ukraine) Anhelina Kalinina	2–6, 2–6
Loss	8–6	Sep 2021	Internacional de Valencia, Spain	W80	Clay	(Italy) Martina Trevisan	6–4, 4–6, 0–6
Win	9–6	Jun 2022	Ilkley Trophy, United Kingdom	W100	Grass	(United Kingdom) Jodie Burrage	7–5, 4–6, 6–3

=== Doubles: 23 (10 titles, 13 runner-ups) ===
Legend $100,000 tournaments (0–2) $50/60,000 tournaments (0–3) $25,000 tournaments (7–6) $10/15,000 tournaments (3–2)	Finals by surface Hard (6–4) Clay (4–8) Grass (0–1)

Result	W–L	Date	Tournament	Tier	Surface	Partner	Opponents	Score
Loss	0–1	Oct 2014	ITF Heraklion, Greece	10,000	Hard	(Hungary) Anna Bondár	(Hungary) Réka Luca Jani (Bulgaria) Julia Stamatova	4–6, 4–6
Win	1–1	Nov 2014	ITF Heraklion, Greece	10,000	Hard	(Hungary) Anna Bondár	(Croatia) Martina Bašić (Croatia) Tena Lukas	4–6, 6–3, [10–8]
Win	2–1	Mar 2015	ITF Solarino, Italy	10,000	Hard	(Hungary) Anna Bondár	(Ukraine) Sofiya Kovalets (Austria) Janina Toljan	6–3, 6–2
Loss	2–2	Sep 2015	ITF Tweed Heads, Australia	15,000	Hard	(Australia) Priscilla Hon	(Australia) Kimberly Birrell (Australia) Tammi Patterson	7–6^{(3)}, 3–6, [8–10]
Win	3–2	Apr 2016	ITF Heraklion, Greece	10,000	Hard	(Italy) Cristiana Ferrando	(Russia) Kseniia Bekker (Romania) Raluca Șerban	6–4, 5–7, [14–12]
Loss	3–3	May 2016	Kurume Cup, Japan	50,000	Grass	(China) Xu Shilin	(Chinese Taipei) Hsu Ching-wen (Russia) Ksenia Lykina	6–7^{(5)}, 2–6
Loss	3–4	Aug 2016	ITF Bükfürdő, Hungary	25,000	Clay	(Hungary) Réka Luca Jani	(Spain) Georgina García Pérez (Hungary) Fanny Stollár	3–6, 6–7^{(4)}
Win	4–4	Oct 2016	ITF Toowoomba, Australia	25,000	Hard	(Slovakia) Viktória Kužmová	(Brazil) Gabriela Cé (Slovakia) Tereza Mihalíková	6–4, 7–6^{(4)}
Loss	4–5	Jun 2017	Open de Marseille, France	100,000	Clay	(Slovenia) Dalila Jakupović	(Russia) Natela Dzalamidze (Russia) Veronika Kudermetova	6–7^{(5)}, 4–6
Loss	4–6	Feb 2018	GB Pro-Series Glasgow, UK	25,000	Hard (i)	(Poland) Katarzyna Piter	(Belgium) Ysaline Bonaventure (Greece) Valentini Grammatikopoulou	5–7, 4–6
Loss	4–7	Mar 2018	ITF Toyota, Japan	25,000	Hard (i)	(Japan) Rika Fujiwara	(South Korea) Choi Ji-hee (South Korea) Kim Na-ri	2–6, 3–6
Loss	4–8	May 2018	ITF Balatonboglar, Hungary	25,000	Clay	(Hungary) Ágnes Bukta	(Hungary) Anna Bondár (Romania) Raluca Șerban	1–6, 6–7^{(2)}
Win	5–8	Aug 2018	GB Pro-Series Foxhills, UK	25,000	Hard	(Greece) Valentini Grammatikopoulou	(United Kingdom) Emily Arbuthnott (Kazakhstan) Anna Danilina	6–0, 4–6, [11–9]
Loss	5–9	Aug 2018	Budapest Ladies Open, Hungary	60,000	Clay	(Hungary) Réka Luca Jani	(Norway) Ulrikke Eikeri (Bulgaria) Elitsa Kostova	6–2, 4–6, [8–10]
Win	6–9	May 2019	Torneo Conchita Martínez, Spain	W25	Clay	(Croatia) Jana Fett	(Greece) Despina Papamichail (Serbia) Nina Stojanović	7–6^{(2)}, 6–2
Loss	6–10	May 2019	Solgironès Open, Spain	W60+H	Clay	(Spain) Georgina García Pérez	(Australia) Arina Rodionova (Australia) Storm Sanders	4–6, 4–6
Win	7–10	Jul 2019	ITF Bytom, Poland	W25	Clay	(Poland) Katarzyna Piter	(Ukraine) Maryna Chernyshova (Russia) Daria Lodikova	6–4, 6–0
Loss	7–11	Sep 2019	ITF Trieste, Italy	W25	Clay	(Greece) Valentini Grammatikopoulou	(Romania) Cristina Dinu (Italy) Angelica Moratelli	6–4, 1–6, [8–10]
Win	8–11	Sep 2019	ITF Kaposvár, Hungary	W25	Clay	(Hungary) Adrienn Nagy	(Hungary) Anna Bondár (Hungary) Réka Luca Jani	7–6^{(5)}, 2–6, [10–3]
Win	9–11	Nov 2019	ITF Malibu, United States	W25	Hard	(Belgium) Kimberley Zimmermann	(United States) Lorraine Guillermo (Poland) Anna Hertel	7–6^{(5)}, 6–3
Win	10–11	Jan 2020	ITF Daytona Beach, US	W25	Clay	(Belgium) Kimberley Zimmermann	(Argentina) Paula Ormaechea (India) Prarthana Thombare	7–6^{(4)}, 6–2
Loss	10–12	Jun 2021	ITF Denain, France	W25	Clay	(Argentina) Paula Ormaechea	(Kazakhstan) Anna Danilina (Ukraine) Valeriya Strakhova	5–7, 6–3, [4–10]
Loss	10–13	Jul 2021	Contrexéville Open, France	W100	Clay	(Belgium) Kimberley Zimmermann	(Kazakhstan) Anna Danilina (Norway) Ulrikke Eikeri	0–6, 6–1, [4–10]

== Junior Grand Slam tournament finals ==
=== Girls' singles: 1 (title) ===
Result	Year	Tournament	Surface	Opponent	Score
Win	2015	US Open	Hard	(United States) Sofia Kenin	7–5, 6–4

=== Girls' doubles: 2 (1 title, 1 runner-up) ===
Result	Year	Tournament	Surface	Partner	Opponents	Score
Loss	2014	Wimbledon	Grass	(Czech Republic) Marie Bouzková	(Indonesia) Tami Grende (China) Ye Qiuyu	2–6, 6–7^{(5)}
Win	2015	Wimbledon	Grass	(Hungary) Fanny Stollár	(Belarus) Vera Lapko (Slovakia) Tereza Mihalíková	6–3, 6–2

== National representation ==
=== Fed Cup ===
Legend
Finals
Finals Qualif. Round
Finals Play-offs (0–1)
Zone Group (13–12)

Gálfi made her debut for the Hungary Fed Cup team in 2015, while the team was competing in the Europe/Africa Zone Group I.

==== Singles (6–9) ====
Edition	Stage	Date	Location	Against	Surface	Opponent	W/L	Score
2015	Z1 RR	Feb 2015	Budapest (HUN)	Serbia	Hard (i)	Ivana Jorović	L	1–6, 0–6
2016	Z1 RR	Feb 2016	Eilat (ISR)	Bulgaria	Hard	Elitsa Kostova	L	5–7, 2–6
2017	Z1 RR	Feb 2017	Tallinn (EST)	Bosnia and Herzegovina	Hard (i)	Jelena Simić	W	6–4, 1–6, 7–5
2017	Z1 RR	Feb 2017	Tallinn (EST)	Croatia	Hard (i)	Donna Vekić	L	2–6, 0–6
2018	Z1 RR	Feb 2018	Tallinn (EST)	Sweden	Hard (i)	Rebecca Peterson	L	3–6, 2–6
2018	Z1 RR	Feb 2018	Tallinn (EST)	Croatia	Hard (i)	Lea Bošković	W	6–2, 2–6, 7–5
2018	Z1 PO	Feb 2018	Tallinn (EST)	(United Kingdom) Great Britain	Hard (i)	Heather Watson	L	6–3, 1–6, 4–6
2019	Z1 RR	Feb 2019	Bath (GBR)	Greece	Hard (i)	Valentini Grammatikopoulou	W	6–0, 6–3
2019	Z1 RR	Feb 2019	Bath (GBR)	Slovenia	Hard (i)	Kaja Juvan	W	6–1, 6–4
2019	Z1 RR	Feb 2019	Bath (GBR)	(United Kingdom) Great Britain	Hard (i)	Katie Boulter	L	4–6, 7–6^{(7–5)}, 6–7^{(1–7)}
2022	Z1 RR	Apr 2022	Antalya (TUR)	Serbia	Clay	Aleksandra Krunić	L	4–6, 2–6
2022	PO	Nov 2022	Oradea (ROU)	Romania	Hard (i)	Ana Bogdan	L	1–6, 4–6
2023	Z1 RR	Apr 2023	Antalya (TUR)	Egypt	Clay	Lamis Alhussein Abdel Aziz	W	6–1, 6–3
2023	Z1 RR	Apr 2023	Antalya (TUR)	Turkey	Clay	Zeynep Sönmez	L	3–6, 4–6
2023	Z1 RR	Apr 2023	Antalya (TUR)	Netherlands	Clay	Suzan Lamens	W	6–4, 6–3

==== Doubles (7–4) ====
Edition	Stage	Date	Location	Against	Surface	Partner	Opponents	W/L	Score
2016	Z1 RR	Feb 2016	Eilat (ISR)	Bulgaria	Hard	Fanny Stollár	Dia Evtimova; Isabella Shinikova	W	6–3, 6–1
2016	Z1 RR	Feb 2016	Eilat (ISR)	Belgium	Hard	Réka Luca Jani	Ysaline Bonaventure; An-Sophie Mestach	L	6–3, 2–6, 2–6
2016	Z1 RR	Feb 2016	Eilat (ISR)	Latvia	Hard	Réka Luca Jani	Diāna Marcinkēviča; Jeļena Ostapenko	L	6–7^{(2–7)}, 3–6
2017	Z1 RR	Feb 2017	Tallinn (EST)	Croatia	Hard (i)	Tímea Babos	Darija Jurak; Ana Konjuh	L	5–7, 6–3, 1–6
2018	Z1 RR	Feb 2018	Tallinn (EST)	Sweden	Hard (i)	Fanny Stollár	Cornelia Lister; Rebecca Peterson	W	7–6^{(7–4)}, 6–3
2018	Z1 RR	Feb 2018	Tallinn (EST)	Slovenia	Hard (i)	Fanny Stollár	Kaja Juvan; Tamara Zidanšek	W	6–4, 6–3
2019	Z1 RR	Feb 2019	Bath (GBR)	Greece	Hard (i)	Réka Luca Jani	Despina Papamichail; Maria Sakkari	W	6–3, 6–4
2022	Z1 RR	Apr 2022	Antalya (TUR)	Turkey	Clay	Réka Luca Jani	Ayla Aksu; Berfu Cengiz	W	7–5, 5–7, 6–3
2023	Z1 RR	Apr 2023	Antalya (TUR)	Turkey	Clay	Anna Bondár	Berfu Cengiz; İpek Öz	L	7–6^{(7–4)}, 4–6, 2–6
2023	Z1 RR	Apr 2023	Antalya (TUR)	Latvia	Clay	Anna Bondár	Diāna Marcinkēviča; Daniela Vismane	W	6–1, 6–2
2023	Z1 RR	Apr 2023	Antalya (TUR)	Netherlands	Clay	Anna Bondár	Suzan Lamens; Bibiane Schoofs	W	4–6, 6–3, 6–2

== Best Grand Slam tournament results details ==
=== Singles ===
	Australian Open			
2023 Australian Open
Round	Opponent	Rank	Score	DGR
1R	(China) Zheng Qinwen (29)	No. 28	0–6, 2–6	No. 88
2026 Australian Open
Round	Opponent	Rank	Score	DGR
1R	(Denmark) Clara Tauson (14)	No. 14	3–6, 3–6	No. 91

	French Open			
2022 French Open
Round	Opponent	Rank	Score	DGR
1R	(Serbia) Olga Danilović (Q)	No. 172	6–3, 6–7^{(4–7)}, 2–6	No. 96
2023 French Open
Round	Opponent	Rank	Score	DGR
1R	Varvara Gracheva	No. 41	4–6, 6–2, 1–6	No. 98
2024 French Open (Lucky Loser)
Round	Opponent	Rank	Score	DGR
Q1	(China) Gao Xinyu	No. 196	6–3, 4–6, 6–3	No. 147
Q2	(Russia) Anastasia Tikhonova	No. 176	6–3, 6–1	No. 147
Q3	(Germany) Jule Niemeier (5)	No. 97	4–6, 1–6	No. 147
1R	(Czech Republic) Kateřina Siniaková (32)	No. 33	5–7, 6–7^{(3–7)}	No. 145
2026 French Open
Round	Opponent	Rank	Score	DGR
1R	(Egypt) Mayar Sherif (Q)	No. 129	5–7, 4–6	No. 115

	Wimbledon Championships			
2023 Wimbledon
Round	Opponent	Rank	Score	DGR
1R	(Czech Republic) Linda Nosková	No. 45	6–7^{(6–8)}, 6–2, 6–2	No. 126
2R	(Germany) Jule Niemeier	No. 103	4–6, 7–6^{(7–5)}, 6–1	No. 126
3R	Ekaterina Alexandrova (21)	No. 22	0–6, 4–6	No. 126
2025 Wimbledon
Round	Opponent	Rank	Score	DGR
1R	(United Kingdom) Harriet Dart (WC)	No. 152	3–6, 6–3, 7–5	No. 110
2R	(Brazil) Beatriz Haddad Maia (21)	No. 20	7–6^{(9–7)}, 6–1	No. 110
3R	(United States) Amanda Anisimova (13)	No. 12	3–6, 7–5, 3–6	No. 110

	US Open			
2022 US Open
Round	Opponent	Rank	Score	DGR
1R	(Spain) Nuria Párrizas Díaz	No. 62	6–4, 6–3	No. 91
2R	(United Kingdom) Harriet Dart	No. 88	6–4, 6–0	No. 91
3R	Veronika Kudermetova (18)	No. 18	2–6, 0–6	No. 91

=== Doubles ===
	Australian Open			
2023 Australian Open
with (United States) Bernarda Pera
Round	Opponents	Rank	Score	DGR
1R	(Kazakhstan) Anna Danilina (8) (India) Sania Mirza (8)	No. 14; No. 29	2–6, 5–7	No. 162

	French Open			
2022 French Open
with Anna Kalinskaya
Round	Opponents	Rank	Score	DGR
1R	(Germany) Anna-Lena Friedsam (Alt) (Germany) Tatjana Maria (Alt)	No. 116; No. 385	6–4, 6–3	No. 185
2R	(Hungary) Anna Bondár (Belgium) Greet Minnen	No. 120; No. 74	5–7, 3–6	No. 185
2023 French Open
with (Poland) Katarzyna Piter (Alt)
Round	Opponents	Rank	Score	DGR
1R	(Chile) Alexa Guarachi (New Zealand) Erin Routliffe	No. 48; No. 34	6–2, 5–7, 6–2	No. 166
2R	(Canada) Gabriela Dabrowski (8) (Brazil) Luisa Stefani (8)	No. 18; No. 23	6–4, 2–6, 5–7	No. 166

	Wimbledon Championships			
2022 Wimbledon
with (Ukraine) Dayana Yastremska
Round	Opponents	Rank	Score	DGR
1R	(Switzerland) Belinda Bencic (Australia) Storm Sanders	No. 168; No. 12	2–6, 7–6^{(9–7)}, 6–7^{(16–18)}	No. 153

	US Open			
2022 US Open
with (United States) Bernarda Pera
Round	Opponents	Rank	Score	DGR
1R	(Belgium) Maryna Zanevska (Belgium) Kimberley Zimmermann	No. 153; No. 48	6–1, 3–6, 6–3	No. 218
2R	(Canada) Leylah Fernandez (Australia) Daria Saville	No. 52; No. 228	6–7^{(5–7)} 6–3, 7–6^{(12–10)}	No. 218
3R	(United States) Caty McNally (United States) Taylor Townsend	No. 22; No. 103	4–6, 4–6	No. 218

== Record against other players ==
=== Double bagel matches ===
Outcome	Year	Tournament	Surface	Opponent	Rank	Round
Win	2022	Miami Open	Hard	(Slovakia) Kristína Kučová	78	1R

== Notes ==
Awards
Preceded by (United States) Catherine "CiCi" Bellis	ITF Junior World Champion; 2015	Succeeded by (Russia) Anastasia Potapova
