= 2022 WTA Argentina Open – Doubles =

Doubles
- 2022 WTA Argentina Open

Final
- Champions: (Romania) Irina Bara (Italy) Sara Errani
- Runners-up: (South Korea) Jang Su-jeong (China) You Xiaodi
- Score: 6–1, 7–5

Events
Singles	Doubles
← 2021 ·	WTA Argentine Open	· 2023 →

Irina Bara and Ekaterine Gorgodze were the defending champions, but chose to defend their title with different partners. Gorgodze partnered Tímea Babos, but they lost in the first round to Danka Kovinić and Nadia Podoroska.

Bara played alongside Sara Errani and successfully defended her title, defeating alternates Jang Su-jeong and You Xiaodi in the final, 6–1, 7–5.

== Seeds ==
1. (Hungary) Tímea Babos / (Georgia (country)) Ekaterine Gorgodze (first round)
2. (Brazil) Ingrid Gamarra Martins / (Brazil) Luisa Stefani (quarterfinals)
3. (Venezuela) Andrea Gámiz / (Netherlands) Eva Vedder (semifinals)
4. (United States) Jessie Aney / (United States) Ingrid Neel (first round)

== Draw ==
=== Key ===
- Q = Qualifier
- WC = Wild card
- LL = Lucky loser
- Alt = Alternate
- SE = Special exempt
- PR = Protected ranking
- ITF = ITF entry
- JE = Junior exempt
- w/o = Walkover
- r = Retired
- d = Defaulted
- SR = Special ranking

=== Draw ===
First round
1	(Hungary) T Babos (Georgia (country)) E Gorgodze	6^{6}	4
(Montenegro) D Kovinić (Argentina) N Podoroska	7^{8}	6
A Anshba; D Astakhova	7^{7}	6
Alt	(Spain) R Vicens Mas (Spain) Y Cavallé Reimers	6^{4}	4
4	(United States) J Aney (United States) I Neel	4	2
(France) C Burel (France) L Jeanjean	6	6
(Romania) I Bara (Italy) S Errani	6	6
(United States) W Osuigwe (Brazil) L Pigossi	3	4
(United States) Q Gleason (France) E Lechemia	6	7^{7}
WC	(Argentina) M Capurro Taborda (Argentina) J Riera	4	6^{3}
(Argentina) ML Carlé (Mexico) M Zacarías	6	5	[2]
3	(Venezuela) A Gámiz (Netherlands) E Vedder	2	7	[10]
(Hungary) RL Jani (Hungary) P Udvardy	4	3
Alt	(South Korea) S-j Jang (China) X You	6	6
(United States) A Rogers (United States) C Rosca	2	5
2	(Brazil) I Gamarra Martins (Brazil) L Stefani	6	7

Quarterfinals
(Montenegro) D Kovinić (Argentina) N Podoroska	5	6	[10]
A Anshba; D Astakhova	7	0	[4]
(France) C Burel (France) L Jeanjean	2	5
(Romania) I Bara (Italy) S Errani	6	7
(United States) Q Gleason (France) E Lechemia	6	3	[7]
3	(Venezuela) A Gámiz (Netherlands) E Vedder	1	6	[10]
Alt	(South Korea) S-j Jang (China) X You	6	5	[10]
2	(Brazil) I Gamarra Martins (Brazil) L Stefani	3	7	[8]

Semifinals
(Montenegro) D Kovinić (Argentina) N Podoroska	2	6	[10]
(Romania) I Bara (Italy) S Errani	6	1	[12]
3	(Venezuela) A Gámiz (Netherlands) E Vedder	6	3	[5]
Alt	(South Korea) S-j Jang (China) X You	3	6	[10]

Final
(Romania) I Bara (Italy) S Errani	6	7
Alt	(South Korea) S-j Jang (China) X You	1	5
