= Anna Bondár =

Hungarian tennis player (born 1997)

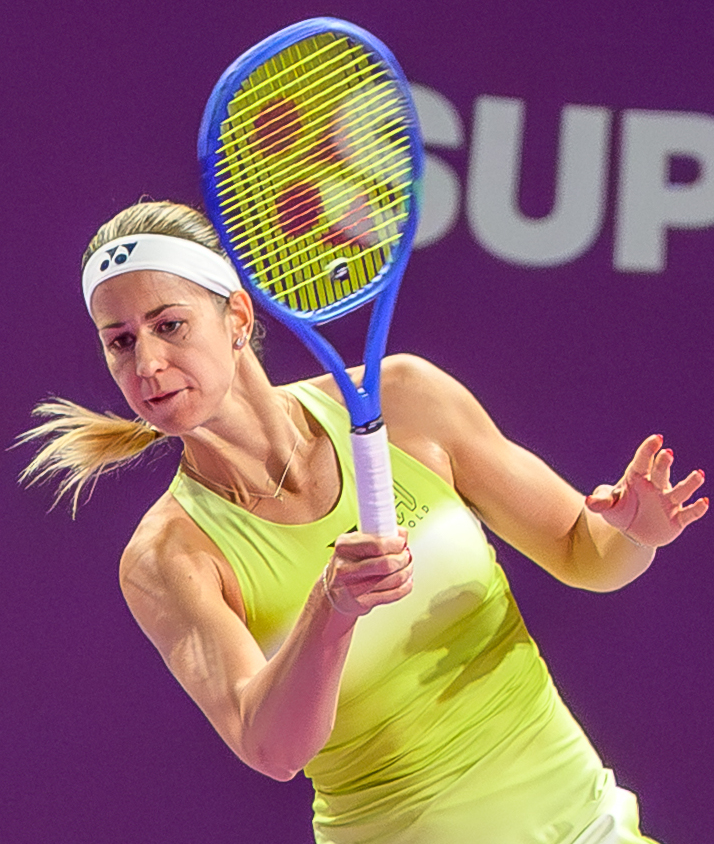
- Bondár at the 2026 Transylvania Open
- Country (sports): Hungary
- Born: 27 May 1997 (age 29) Szeghalom, Hungary
- Height: 1.75 m (5 ft 9 in)
- Plays: Right (two-handed backhand)
- Prize money: US$ 3,367,918

Singles
- Career record: 461–275
- Career titles: 2 WTA Challengers
- Highest ranking: No. 50 (18 July 2022)
- Current ranking: No. 73 (31 August 2026)

Grand Slam singles results
- Australian Open: 2R (2023, 2026)
- French Open: 2R (2025)
- Wimbledon: 1R (2022, 2023, 2025, 2026)
- US Open: 2R (2024, 2025, 2026)

Doubles
- Career record: 244–130
- Career titles: 2
- Highest ranking: No. 43 (30 January 2023)
- Current ranking: No. 241 (31 August 2026)

Grand Slam doubles results
- Australian Open: 2R (2023, 2024)
- French Open: QF (2022, 2023)
- Wimbledon: 3R (2023)
- US Open: 3R (2026)

Team competitions
- Fed Cup: 19–11
- Last updated on: 6 September 2026.

Anna Bondár (born 27 May 1997) is a Hungarian professional tennis player. She has a career-high singles ranking of No. 50 by the WTA, achieved on 18 July 2022, and a best doubles ranking of No. 43, reached on 30 January 2023.

Playing for Hungary in Billie Jean King Cup, Bondár has a win–loss record of 19–11 (as of August 2026).

== Career ==
=== 2021: WTA 125 title, top 100 ===
In July in Gdynia, at the Poland Open, Bondár reached her first WTA Tour-level quarterfinal also recording her first two wins on the tour. She lost in the last eight to Tamara Korpatsch.

Starting in September, she had a series of good results. At the 60k Collonge-Bellerive tournament, she reached the semifinals without dropping a single set. The following week, she advanced to the quarterfinals of the Karlsruhe Open. Two weeks later, she won her first significant ITF titles at the 80k Wiesbaden Open in both singles and doubles events. Her journey continued seven days later when she reached another 80k final in Le Neuborg. This time she failed to lift the trophy, losing to Mihaela Buzărnescu.

In November, she won her first WTA 125 title, defeating Diane Parry in the final of the Argentina Open. The following week, she won the 60k Copa Santiago and secured her debut in the top 100, at world No. 90, on 15 November 2021.

=== 2022: Maiden WTA Tour doubles title, singles top 50 ===
Bondár made her Grand Slam tournament main-draw debut at the Australian Open, losing to 10th seed Anastasia Pavlyuchenkova in the first round.

At the French Open, she reached the first major quarterfinal in the doubles event, partnering Greet Minnen.

Seeded ninth at the Budapest Grand Prix, Bondár advanced to the semifinals without dropping a set, defeating second seeded Martina Trevisan. Despite losing in the last four to qualifier and eventual champion Bernarda Pera, she reached the top 50 on 18 July.

She won her maiden WTA Tour doubles title at the Palermo Ladies Open, partnering with Kimberley Zimmermann to defeat Amina Anshba and Panna Udvardy in the final.

=== 2023–2024: Second career doubles title ===
As a qualifier at the 2023 Italian Open, Bondár reached the third round of WTA 1000 tournament for the first time, defeating Tatjana Maria and 13th seed Karolína Plíšková, before losing to 22nd seed Zheng Qinwen.

Partnering with Diane Parry, Bondár won the doubles title at the 2023 Lausanne Open, defeating Amina Anshba and Anastasia Dețiuc in the final.

At the 2024 Iaşi Open, she reached the quarterfinals by defeating qualifier Marie Benoît and Marina Bassols Ribera, before losing to Olga Danilović.

At the 2024 Hamburg Open, Bondár reached the quarterfinals as the fourth seed, with wins over qualifier Andrea Petkovic and Kateryna Baindl. She moved on to the semifinals with a retirement from Eva Lys. In the last four, Bondár defeated Olga Danilović to set up a final with defending champion, Arantxa Rus, whom she defeated in straight sets. At the same tournament, she partnered Kimberley Zimmermann to win the doubles title, overcoming Arantxa Rus and Nina Stojanović in the final.

=== 2025: First tour singles final ===
Teaming up with Simona Waltert, Bondár won the Antalya Challenger 3 in April, defeating Alicia Barnett and Elixane Lechemia in the final.

She made it into the second round at the French Open for the first time with a win over Laura Siegemund, before losing to 13th seed Elina Svitolina.

In July at the Hamburg Open, which was now back as a WTA 250 tournament, after being downgraded to a WTA 125 event the previous year, Bondár reached her first tour-level singles final, defeating wildcard entrant Noma Noha Akugue, Sinja Kraus, top seed Ekaterina Alexandrova and Kaja Juvan. She lost the championship match to Loïs Boisson, in straight sets. Partnering Arantxa Rus, she also made it through to the doubles final but lost in a champions tiebreak to top seeds Nadiia Kichenok and Makoto Ninomiya.

At the US Open, Bondár defeated 12th seed Elina Svitolina in the first round, before losing her next match to Maria Sakkari. In October, she reached the final at the WTA 125 Jinan Open but lost to Janice Tjen.

=== 2026: WTA 1000 fourth round ===
Bondár recorded wins over lucky loser Ella Seidel and sixth seed Tatjana Maria to make it into the quarterfinals at the Hobart International, at which point her run was ended by qualifier and eventual champion, Elisabetta Cocciaretto.

Teaming up with Magdalena Fręch, she reached the doubles final at the Charleston Open, losing to Desirae Krawczyk and Caty McNally in straight sets. At the Open de Rouen, Bondár defeated lucky loser Harmony Tan and Oleksandra Oliynykova to reach the quarterfinals, at which point she lost to second seed Sorana Cîrstea.

At the Madrid Open, she overcame Viktorija Golubic, seventh seed Elina Svitolina for her maiden win against a top-10 ranked player, and wildcard entrant Laura Samson to make it through to the fourth round of a WTA 1000 event for the first time. Bondár lost to ninth seed Mirra Andreeva in a deciding set tiebreak at the end of a match lasting almost three hours. Seeded fifth at the Morocco Open, Bondár reached the quarterfinals, where she was defeated by Anhelina Kalinina.

In July at the Hamburg Open, she made it through to the final at this tournament for the second successive year with wins over Moyuka Uchijima, Noma Noha Akugue, Alina Charaeva and qualifier Elina Avanesyan. Just as was the case 12 months earlier, Bondár lost in the championship match, this time to fifth seed Tamara Korpatsch.

At the US Open, Bondár reached the second round for the third year in a row, but once again could progress no further as she lost to 22nd seed Madison Keys in a deciding 10 point tiebreak having failed to convert five match points earlier in the match. Seeded sixth at the Korea Open, she defeated Renata Zarazúa, Alina Charaeva and fourth seed Elena-Gabriela Ruse to make it into the semifinals, where her run was ended by second seed Kimberly Birrell.

== Performance timelines ==
Key
W	F	SF	QF	#R	RR	Q#	DNQ	A	NH

(W) winner; (F) finalist; (SF) semifinalist; (QF) quarterfinalist; (#R) rounds 4, 3, 2, 1; (RR) round-robin stage; (Q#) qualification round; (DNQ) did not qualify; (A) absent; (NH) not held; (SR) strike rate (events won / competed); (W–L) win–loss record.
To avoid confusion and double counting, these charts are updated at the conclusion of a tournament or when the player's participation has ended.

Only main-draw results in WTA Tour, Grand Slam tournaments, Billie Jean King Cup, United Cup, Hopman Cup and Olympic Games are included in win–loss records.

=== Singles ===
Current through the 2026 US Open.

Tournament	2015	2016	2017	2018	2019	2020	2021	2022	2023	2024	2025	2026	SR	W–L	Win%
Grand Slam tournaments
Australian Open	A	A	A	A	A	Q1	A	1R	2R	Q3	1R	2R	0 / 4	2–4	33%
French Open	A	A	A	A	A	A	A	1R	1R	Q1	2R	1R	0 / 4	1–4	20%
Wimbledon	A	A	A	A	Q1	NH	Q1	1R	1R	Q1	1R	1R	0 / 4	0–4	0%
US Open	A	A	A	A	Q1	A	Q2	1R	Q2	2R	2R	2R	0 / 4	3–4	43%
Win–loss	0–0	0–0	0–0	0–0	0–0	0–0	0–0	0–4	1–3	1–1	2–4	2–4	0 / 16	6–16	27%
National representation
Billie Jean King Cup (Note: Formerly known as Fed Cup until 2020.)	Z1	Z1	A	Z1	Z1	A (Note: Edition is split into the two years due to COVID-19.)		PO	PO	A	A		0 / 0	8–6	57%
WTA 1000 tournaments
Qatar Open	NTI	A	NTI	A	NTI	A	NTI	Q2	NTI	A	Q1	A	0 / 0	0–0	–
Dubai Championships	A	NTI	A	NTI	A	NTI	A	NTI	A	A	A	Q1	0 / 0	0–0	–
Indian Wells Open	A	A	A	A	A	NH	A	1R	1R	A	Q1	2R	0 / 3	1–3	25%
Miami Open	A	A	A	A	A	NH	A	2R	1R	Q1	1R	1R	0 / 4	1–4	20%
Madrid Open	A	A	A	A	A	NH	A	1R	1R	Q1	Q1	4R	0 / 3	3–3	50%
Italian Open	A	A	A	A	A	A	A	A	3R	Q2	1R	1R	0 / 3	2–3	40%
Canadian Open	A	A	A	A	A	NH	A	1R	A	A	A		0 / 1	0–1	0%
Cincinnati Open	A	A	A	A	A	A	A	Q1	A	A	1R		0 / 1	0–1	0%
China Open	A	A	A	A	A	NH			A	1R	2R		0 / 2	1–2	33%
Wuhan Open	A	A	A	A	A	NH				A	Q1		0 / 0	0–0	–
Win–loss	0–0	0–0	0–0	0–0	0–0	0–0	0–0	1–4	2–4	0–1	1–4	4–4	0 / 17	8–17	32%
Career statistics
	2015	2016	2017	2018	2019	2020	2021	2022	2023	2024	2025	2026	SR	W–L	Win%
Tournaments	0	0 (Note: During the season, she did not play in the main draw of any tour-level tournaments. However, she played at the Billie Jean King Cup, which is not counted as a played tournament but matches count.)	0	0	2	0	3	20	14	11	15	11	Career total: 39		
Titles	0	0	0	0	0	0	0	0	0	0	0	0	Career total: 0		
Finals	0	0	0	0	0	0	0	0	0	0	1	0	Career total: 1		
Hard win–loss	0–0	2–1	0–0	0–1	1–3	0–0	0–2	7–10	3–7	2–8	5–11	5–7	0 / 45	25–50	33%
Clay win–loss	0–0	0–0	0–0	0–0	0–1	0–0	2–1	13–9	9–6	3–3	5–3	7–4	0 / 27	39–27	59%
Grass win–loss	0–0	0–0	0–0	0–0	0–0	0–0	0–0	0–2	0–1	0–0	0–1	0–0	0 / 4	0–4	0%
Overall win–loss	0–0	2–1	0–0	0–1	1–4	0–0	2–3	20–21	12–14	5–11	11–15	12–11	0 / 76	65–81	45%
Year-end ranking (Note: 2014: WTA ranking-789.)	397	405	563	261	222	273	90	71	114	94	78		$3,031,355		

=== Doubles ===
Current through the 2023 US Open.

Tournament	2015	2016	2017	2018	2019	2020	2021	2022	2023	SR	W–L	Win%
Grand Slam tournaments
Australian Open	A	A	A	A	A	A	A	1R	2R	0 / 2	1–2	33%
French Open	A	A	A	A	A	A	A	QF	QF	0 / 2	5–2	71%
Wimbledon	A	A	A	A	A	NH	A	1R	3R	0 / 2	2–2	50%
US Open	A	A	A	A	A	A	A	2R	1R	0 / 2	1–2	33%
Win–loss	0–0	0–0	0–0	0–0	0–0	0–0	0–0	3–4	6–4	0 / 8	9–8	53%
National representation
Billie Jean King Cup	Z1	Z1	A	Z1	Z1	A		PO	PO	0 / 0	6–1	86%
WTA 1000 tournaments
Qatar Open	NTI	A	NTI	A	NTI	A	NTI	2R (Note: Withdrew during the tournament. Not counted as a loss.)	NTI	0 / 1	1–0	100%
Dubai Championships	A	NTI	A	NTI	A	NTI	A	NTI		0 / 0	0–0	–
Indian Wells Open	A	A	A	A	A	NH	A	A	1R	0 / 1	0–1	0%
Miami Open	A	A	A	A	A	NH	A	A	1R	0 / 1	0–1	0%
Madrid Open	A	A	A	A	A	NH	A	A	A	0 / 0	0–0	–
Italian Open	A	A	A	A	A	A	A	A	A	0 / 0	0–0	–
Canadian Open	A	A	A	A	A	NH	A	1R	A	0 / 1	0–1	0%
Cincinnati Open	A	A	A	A	A	A	A	A	A	0 / 0	0–0	–
China Open	A	A	A	A	A	NH			A	0 / 0	0–0	–
Wuhan Open	A	A	A	A	A	NH				0 / 0	0–0	–
Win–loss	0–0	0–0	0–0	0–0	0–0	0–0	0–0	1–1	0–2	0 / 3	1–3	25%
Career statistics
	2015	2016	2017	2018	2019	2020	2021	2022	2023	SR	W–L	Win%
Tournaments	0	0	0	2	1	0	3	17	11	Career total: 34		
Titles	0	0	0	0	0	0	0	1	1	Career total: 2		
Finals	0	0	0	0	0	0	0	1	1	Career total: 2		
Overall win–loss	1–0	0–0	0–0	1–2	0–1	0–0	4–3	14–14	15–11	2 / 35	35–31	53%
Year-end ranking (Note: 2014: WTA ranking-933.)	415	511	557	287	198	178	128	50	52			

== WTA Tour finals ==
=== Singles: 2 (2 runner-ups) ===
Legend WTA 250 (0–2)	Finals by surface Clay (0–2)	Finals by setting Outdoor (0–2)

Result	W–L	Date	Tournament	Tier	Surface	Opponent	Score
Loss	0–1	Jul 2025	Hamburg Open, Germany	WTA 250	Clay	(France) Loïs Boisson	5–7, 3–6
Loss	0–2	Jul 2026	Hamburg Open, Germany	WTA 250	Clay	(Germany) Tamara Korpatsch	3–6, 3–6

=== Doubles: 5 (2 titles, 3 runner-ups) ===
Legend WTA 500 (0–1) WTA 250 (2–2)	Finals by surface Clay (2–3)	Finals by setting Outdoor (2–3)

Result	W–L	Date	Tournament	Tier	Surface	Partner	Opponents	Score
Win	1–0	Jul 2022	Palermo Ladies Open, Italy	WTA 250	Clay	(Belgium) Kimberley Zimmermann	Amina Anshba (Hungary) Panna Udvardy	6–3, 6–2
Win	2–0	Jul 2023	Ladies Open Lausanne, Switzerland	WTA 250	Clay	(France) Diane Parry	Amina Anshba (Czech Republic) Anastasia Dețiuc	6–2, 6–1
Loss	2–1	Apr 2024	Copa Colsanitas, Colombia	WTA 250	Clay	Irina Khromacheva	(Spain) Cristina Bucșa; Kamilla Rakhimova	6–7^{(5–7)}, 6–3, [8–10]
Loss	2–2	Jul 2025	Hamburg Open, Germany	WTA 250	Clay	(Netherlands) Arantxa Rus	(Ukraine) Nadiia Kichenok (Japan) Makoto Ninomiya	4–6, 6–3, [9–11]
Loss	2–3	Mar 2026	Charleston Open, US	WTA 500	Clay (green)	(Poland) Magdalena Fręch	(United States) Desirae Krawczyk (United States) Caty McNally	3–6, 2–6

== WTA 125 finals ==
=== Singles: 4 (2 titles, 2 runner-ups) ===
Result	W–L	Date	Tournament	Surface	Opponent	Score
Win	1–0	Nov 2021	Buenos Aires Open, Argentina	Clay	(France) Diane Parry	6–3, 6–3
Win	2–0	Aug 2024	Hamburg Open, Germany	Clay	(Netherlands) Arantxa Rus	6–4, 6–2
Loss	2–1	Jun 2025	Bari Open, Italy	Clay	(Romania) Anca Todoni	7–6^{(4)}, 4–6, 4–6
Loss	2–2	Oct 2025	Jinan Open, China	Hard	(Indonesia) Janice Tjen	4–6, 6–4, 4–6

=== Doubles: 6 (4 titles, 2 runner-ups) ===
Result	W–L	Date	Tournament	Surface	Partner	Opponents	Score
Win	1–0	Sep 2022	Budapest Pro Ladies Open, Hungary	Clay	(Belgium) Kimberley Zimmermann	(Czech Republic) Jesika Malečková (Czech Republic) Renata Voráčová	6–3, 2–6, [10–5]
Loss	1–1	Sep 2023	Parma Open, Italy	Clay	(Belgium) Kimberley Zimmermann	(Slovenia) Dalila Jakupović; Irina Khromacheva	2–6, 3–6
Loss	1–2	Oct 2023	Open de Rouen, France	Hard (i)	(Belgium) Kimberley Zimmermann	(United Kingdom) Maia Lumsden (France) Jessika Ponchet	3–6, 6–7^{(4–7)}
Win	2–2	Mar 2024	San Luis Open, Mexico	Clay	(Slovenia) Tamara Zidanšek	(Brazil) Laura Pigossi (Poland) Katarzyna Piter	walkover
Win	3–2	Aug 2024	Hamburg Open, Germany	Clay	(Belgium) Kimberley Zimmermann	(Netherlands) Arantxa Rus (Serbia) Nina Stojanović	5–7, 6–3, [11–9]
Win	4–2	Mar 2025	Antalya Challenger, Turkey	Clay	(Switzerland) Simona Waltert	(United Kingdom) Alicia Barnett (France) Elixane Lechemia	7–5, 2–6, [10–6]

== ITF Circuit finals ==
=== Singles: 28 (17 titles, 11 runner-ups) ===
Legend W100 tournaments (1–0) W80 tournaments (1–1) W60/75 tournaments (5–2) W25 tournaments (2–4) W10/15 tournaments (8–4)	Finals by surface Hard (3–3) Clay (14–8)

Result	W–L	Date	Tournament	Tier	Surface	Opponent	Score
Win	1–0	May 2014	ITF Antalya, Turkey	W10	Hard	(Russia) Olga Doroshina	6–3, 6–2
Loss	1–1	Apr 2015	ITF Heraklion, Greece	W10	Hard	(Romania) Raluca Șerban	6–4, 4–6, 1–6
Win	2–1	May 2015	ITF Sibiu, Romania	W10	Clay	(Romania) Mădălina Gojnea	6–1, 4–6, 6–1
Win	3–1	Sep 2015	ITF Bol, Croatia	W10	Clay	(Croatia) Tena Lukas	6–4, 6–2
Win	4–1	Sep 2015	ITF Bol, Croatia	W10	Clay	(Czech Republic) Magdaléna Pantůčková	7–5, 6–4
Win	5–1	Oct 2015	ITF Antalya, Turkey	W10	Hard	(Belgium) Greet Minnen	3–6, 6–2, 6–1
Win	6–1	Nov 2015	ITF Antalya, Turkey	W10	Clay	(Russia) Alisa Kleybanova	6–3, 6–4
Loss	6–2	Mar 2016	Clay Court International, Australia	W25	Clay	(Japan) Miyu Kato	4–6, 6–7^{(3)}
Win	7–2	Oct 2017	ITF Heraklion, Greece	W15	Clay	(Hungary) Réka Luca Jani	6–2, 6–3
Loss	7–3	Nov 2017	ITF Heraklion, Greece	W15	Clay	(Hungary) Réka Luca Jani	0–6, 3–6
Loss	7–4	Mar 2018	ITF Heraklion, Greece	W15	Clay	(Czech Republic) Anastasia Dețiuc	3–6, 2–6
Loss	7–5	Mar 2018	ITF Heraklion, Greece	W15	Clay	(Switzerland) Ylena In-Albon	6–4, 6–7^{(3)}, 1–6
Win	8–5	May 2018	ITF Kaposvár, Hungary	W15	Clay	(Czech Republic) Aneta Kladivová	6–4, 7–6^{(3)}
Win	9–5	Oct 2018	ITF Seville, Spain	W25	Clay	(Turkey) Başak Eraydın	6–2, 5–7, 6–2
Win	10–5	Jan 2019	ITF Daytona Beach, United States	W25	Clay	(Canada) Françoise Abanda	6–7^{(3)}, 7–6^{(5)}, 7–5
Loss	10–6	Jan 2019	ITF Plantation, United States	W25	Clay	(United States) Hailey Baptiste	5–7, 7–6^{(6)}, 2–6
Loss	10–7	Mar 2019	ITF Curitiba, Brazil	W25	Clay	(Italy) Jasmine Paolini	6–4, 4–6, 2–6
Loss	10–8	Feb 2021	ITF Potchefstroom, South Africa	W25	Hard	(Spain) Nuria Párrizas Díaz	1–6, 6–4, 2–6
Win	11–8	Sep 2021	Wiesbaden Open, Germany	W80	Clay	(France) Clara Burel	6–2, 6–4
Loss	11–9	Oct 2021	ITF Le Neubourg, France	W80+H	Hard	(Romania) Mihaela Buzărnescu	1–6, 3–6
Win	12–9	Nov 2021	Copa Santiago, Chile	W60+H	Clay	(Paraguay) Verónica Cepede Royg	6–2, 6–3
Win	13–9	Sep 2023	Montreux Ladies Open, Switzerland	W60	Clay	(Germany) Anna Gabric	6–4, 6–1
Win	14–9	Feb 2024	Porto Women's Indoor, Portugal	W75	Hard (i)	(Germany) Noma Noha Akugue	7–6^{(4)}, 6–2
Loss	14–10	Apr 2024	Bellinzona Ladies Open, Switzerland	W75	Clay	(France) Loïs Boisson	3–6, 6–2, 4–6
Loss	14–11	Apr 2024	Chiasso Open, Switzerland	W75	Clay	(Argentina) Julia Riera	3–6, 6–7^{(2)}
Win	15–11	Jun 2024	ITS Cup Olomouc, Czech Republic	W75	Clay	(South Korea) Jang Su-jeong	6–3, 7–6^{(4)}
Win	16–11	Aug 2024	Ladies Open Hechingen, Germany	W75	Clay	(Russia) Ekaterina Makarova	6–0, 6–2
Win	17–11	Apr 2025	Wiesbaden Open, Germany	W100	Clay	(Austria) Julia Grabher	6–2, 6–4

=== Doubles: 36 (23 titles, 13 runner-ups) ===
Legend W100 tournaments (1–0) W80 tournaments (1–0) W60/75 tournaments (2–0) W25 tournaments (7–7) W10/15 tournaments (12–6)	Finals by surface Hard (8–7) Clay (15–6)

Result	W–L	Date	Tournament	Tier	Surface	Partner	Opponents	Score
Loss	0–1	Oct 2014	ITF Heraklion, Greece	W10	Hard	(Hungary) Dalma Gálfi	(Hungary) Réka Luca Jani (Bulgaria) Julia Stamatova	4–6, 4–6
Win	1–1	Nov 2014	ITF Heraklion, Greece	W10	Hard	(Hungary) Dalma Gálfi	(Croatia) Martina Bašić (Croatia) Tena Lukas	4–6, 6–3, [10–8]
Win	2–1	Dec 2014	ITF Tel Aviv, Israel	W10	Hard	(Romania) Ilka Csöregi	(Ukraine) Anna Bogoslavets (Israel) Ester Masuri	6–1, 6–3
Win	3–1	Mar 2015	ITF Solarino, Italy	W10	Hard	(Hungary) Dalma Gálfi	(Ukraine) Sofiya Kovalets (Austria) Janina Toljan	6–3, 6–2
Loss	3–2	Mar 2015	ITF Solarino, Italy	W10	Hard	(Russia) Olga Doroshina	(Italy) Francesca Palmigiano (Switzerland) Lisa Sabino	3–6, 6–4, [3–10]
Win	4–2	Apr 2015	ITF Heraklion, Greece	W10	Hard	(Austria) Lisa-Maria Moser	(Oman) Fatma Al-Nabhani (India) Sharmada Balu	6–3, 7–5
Win	5–2	May 2015	ITF Sibiu, Romania	W10	Clay	(Romania) Ana Bianca Mihăilă	(Romania) Mihaela Ghioca (Romania) Iuliana Oante	6–4, 6–4
Loss	5–3	Sep 2015	ITF Bol, Croatia	W10	Clay	(Hungary) Rebeka Stolmár	(Croatia) Adrijana Lekaj (Croatia) Silvia Njirić	4–6, 5–7
Loss	5–4	Oct 2015	ITF Antalya, Turkey	W10	Hard	(Hungary) Rebeka Stolmár	(Romania) Nicoleta Dascălu (Romania) Andreea Ghițescu	4–6, 6–3, [5–10]
Win	6–4	Oct 2015	ITF Antalya, Turkey	W10	Hard	(Hungary) Rebeka Stolmár	(Romania) Daiana Negreanu (Spain) Cristina Sánchez Quintanar	6–1, 2–6, [10–5]
Loss	6–5	Oct 2015	ITF Antalya, Turkey	W10	Hard	(Hungary) Rebeka Stolmár	(Germany) Anna Klasen (Germany) Charlotte Klasen	4–6, 4–6
Loss	6–6	Nov 2015	ITF Antalya, Turkey	W10	Clay	(Hungary) Rebeka Stolmár	(Hungary) Ágnes Bukta (Slovakia) Vivien Juhászová	5–7, 3–6
Win	7–6	Nov 2015	ITF Antalya, Turkey	W10	Clay	(Hungary) Rebeka Stolmár	(Georgia (country)) Sofia Kvatsabaia (Germany) Julyette Steur	2–6, 6–4, [10–2]
Win	8–6	Aug 2017	ITF Graz, Austria	W15	Clay	(Hungary) Réka Luca Jani	(Slovakia) Jana Jablonovská (Slovakia) Natália Vajdová	6–4, 6–3
Win	9–6	Oct 2017	ITF Heraklion, Greece	W15	Clay	(Hungary) Réka Luca Jani	(Belgium) Michaela Boev (Russia) Anna Ukolova	6–4, 6–2
Win	10–6	Nov 2017	ITF Heraklion, Greece	W15	Clay	(Hungary) Réka Luca Jani	(Romania) Ioana Gaspar (Serbia) Bojana Marinković	6–4, 2–6, [10–8]
Win	11–6	Mar 2018	ITF Heraklion, Greece	W15	Clay	(Hungary) Réka Luca Jani	(Finland) Emma Laine (United States) Sabrina Santamaria	7–5, 6–2
Win	12–6	May 2018	ITF Balatonboglár, Hungary	W25	Clay	(Romania) Raluca Șerban	(Hungary) Ágnes Bukta (Hungary) Dalma Gálfi	6–1, 7–6^{(2)}
Win	13–6	May 2018	ITF Kaposvár, Hungary	W15	Clay	(Hungary) Panna Udvardy	(Ukraine) Yuliya Lysa (Russia) Maria Marfutina	7–6^{(6)}, 6–1
Win	14–6	Aug 2018	ITF Koksijde, Belgium	W25	Clay	(Romania) Raluca Șerban	(Bosnia and Herzegovina) Dea Herdželaš (Slovakia) Tereza Mihalíková	6–3, 6–0
Win	15–6	Jan 2019	ITF Daytona Beach, United States	W25	Clay	(Norway) Ulrikke Eikeri	(United States) Hailey Baptiste (United States) Emina Bektas	6–3, 5–7, [11–9]
Loss	15–7	May 2019	ITF Santa Margherita di Pula, Italy	W25	Clay	(United Kingdom) Naiktha Bains	(Brazil) Gabriela Cé (United States) Chiara Scholl	0–6, 5–7
Win	16–7	Sep 2019	Zagreb Ladies Open, Croatia	W60	Clay	(Argentina) Paula Ormaechea	(France) Amandine Hesse (Chile) Daniela Seguel	7–5, 7–5
Loss	16–8	Sep 2019	ITF Sankt Pölten, Austria	W25	Clay	(Hungary) Réka Luca Jani	(Romania) Irina Fetecău (Hungary) Panna Udvardy	6–7^{(5)}, 6–0, [9–11]
Loss	16–9	Sep 2019	ITF Kaposvár, Hungary	W25	Clay	(Hungary) Réka Luca Jani	(Hungary) Dalma Gálfi (Hungary) Adrienn Nagy	6–7^{(5)}, 6–2, [3–10]
Loss	16–10	Jan 2020	Canberra International, Australia (Note: Tournament was held in Bendigo instead of Canberra.)	W25	Hard	(Turkey) Pemra Özgen	(Australia) Alison Bai (Australia) Jaimee Fourlis	7–5, 4–6, [8–10]
Win	17–10	Feb 2020	Trnava Indoor, Slovakia	W25	Hard (i)	(Slovakia) Tereza Mihalíková	(Russia) Amina Anshba (Czech Republic) Anastasia Dețiuc	6–4, 6–4
Loss	17–11	Sep 2020	ITF Tarvisio, Italy	W25	Clay	(Argentina) Paula Ormaechea	(Belgium) Marie Benoît (Romania) Alexandra Cadanțu	1–6, 3–6
Win	18–11	Sep 2020	Grado Tennis Cup, Italy	W25	Clay	(Hungary) Fanny Stollár	(Italy) Federica di Sarra (Italy) Camilla Rosatello	7–5, 6–2
Win	19–11	Jan 2021	ITF Hamburg, Germany	W25	Hard (i)	(Slovakia) Tereza Mihalíková	(France) Amandine Hesse (Belgium) Kimberley Zimmermann	6–4, 6–4
Loss	19–12	Feb 2021	ITF Potchefstroom, South Africa	W25	Hard	(Hungary) Réka Luca Jani	(Czech Republic) Miriam Kolodziejová (Czech Republic) Jesika Malečková	2–6, 6–3, [5–10]
Loss	19–13	Mar 2021	ITF Manacor, Spain	W25	Hard	(Slovakia) Tereza Mihalíková	(Hungary) Réka Luca Jani (Belgium) Lara Salden	4–6, 5–7
Win	20–13	May 2021	Prague Open, Czech Republic	W25	Clay	(Belgium) Kimberley Zimmermann	(Switzerland) Xenia Knoll (Romania) Elena-Gabriela Ruse	7–6^{(5)}, 6–2
Win	21–13	Sep 2021	Wiesbaden Open, Germany	W80	Clay	(Belgium) Lara Salden	(Netherlands) Arianne Hartono (Australia) Olivia Tjandramulia	6–7^{(9)}, 6–2, [10–4]
Win	22–13	Aug 2023	ITF Maspalomas, Spain	W100	Clay	(Hungary) Tímea Babos	(Spain) Leyre Romero Gormaz (Netherlands) Arantxa Rus	6–4, 3–6, [10–4]
Win	23–13	Feb 2024	Porto Indoor, Portugal	W75	Hard (i)	(Switzerland) Céline Naef	(Portugal) Francisca Jorge (Portugal) Matilde Jorge	6–4, 3–6, [11–9]

=== ITF Junior Circuit finals ===
Legend
Category G1
Category G2
Category G3
Category G4
Category G5

==== Singles: 5 (2 titles, 3 runner-ups) ====
Result	W–L	Date	Tournament	Grade	Surface	Opponent	Score
Loss	0–1	May 2013	ITF Budapest, Hungary	G4	Clay	(Serbia) Ivana Jorović	3–6, 6–3, 1–6
Loss	0–2	Jun 2013	ITF Budapest, Hungary	G2	Clay	(Serbia) Ivana Jorović	3–6, 3–6
Win	1–2	Sep 2013	ITF Novi Sad, Serbia	G2	Clay	(Romania) Jaqueline Cristian	6–1, 6–1
Loss	1–3	Feb 2014	ITF Hammamet, Tunisia	G2	Clay	(Egypt) Sandra Samir	4–6, 6–7^{(2)}
Win	2–3	Jul 2015	ITF Klosters, Switzerland	B1	Clay	(Switzerland) Jil Teichmann	2–6, 6–3, 6–1

==== Doubles: 11 (6 titles, 5 runner-ups) ====
Result	W–L	Date	Tournament	Grade	Surface	Partner	Opponents	Score
Win	1–0	Jun 2012	ITF Budapest, Hungary	G2	Clay	(Hungary) Rebeka Stolmár	(Romania) Nicoleta Dascălu (Serbia) Jelena Džinić	6–0, 6–3
Win	2–0	Sep 2012	ITF Novi Sad, Serbia	G2	Clay	(Hungary) Bianka Békefi	(Italy) Giulia Pairone (Romania) Ioana Loredana Roșca	6–0, 6–2
Win	3–0	Nov 2012	ITF Budapest, Hungary	G4	Clay (i)	(Hungary) Dalma Gálfi	(Slovenia) Hana Mraz (Slovenia) Manca Pislak	6–1, 6–2
Win	4–0	Dec 2012	ITF Zagreb, Croatia	G4	Hard (i)	(Hungary) Alexa Pirók	(Serbia) Bojana Marinković (Slovenia) Manca Pislak	7–6^{(5)}, 6–4
Loss	4–1	Feb 2013	ITF Cadolzburg, Germany	G4	Carpet (i)	(Hungary) Dalma Gálfi	(Germany) Katharina Hobgarski (Germany) Lisa Ponomar	2–6, 1–6
Win	5–1	Aug 2013	ITF Budaörs, Hungary	G2	Clay	(Hungary) Lilla Barzó	(Czech Republic) Simona Heinová (Russia) Anastasiya Komardina	6–1, 6–3
Loss	5–2	Sep 2013	ITF Novi Sad, Serbia	G2	Clay	(Hungary) Fanny Stollár	(Hungary) Lilla Barzó (Romania) Ilka Csöregi	6–7^{(3)}, 4–6
Win	6–2	Dec 2013	ITF Bradenton, United States	G1	Clay	(Australia) Naiktha Bains	(Bosnia and Herzegovina) Katarina Jokić (Lithuania) Akvilė Paražinskaitė	6–2, 6–2
Loss	6–3	Feb 2014	ITF Hammamet, Tunisia	G2	Clay	(Hungary) Rebeka Stolmár	(Lithuania) Justina Mikulskytė (United Kingdom) Mirabelle Njoze	6–7^{(3)}, 6–7^{(6)}
Loss	6–4	Feb 2014	ITF Casablanca, Morocco	G1	Clay	(Romania) Ioana Ducu	(Slovakia) Viktória Kužmová (Slovakia) Kristína Schmiedlová	walkover
Loss	6–5	Mar 2014	ITF São José do Rio Preto, Brazil	G1	Clay	(Hungary) Fanny Stollár	(Brazil) Luisa Stefani (Mexico) Renata Zarazúa	4–6, 3–6

== Fed Cup/Billie Jean King Cup ==
Bondár made her Billie Jean King Cup debut for Hungary in 2015, while the team was competing in the Europe/Africa Zone Group I, when she was 17 years and 255 days old.

Group membership World Group (0–0) World Group Play-off (0–0) World Group II (0–0) World Group II Play-off (0–1) Europe/Africa Group (14–6)	Matches by surface Hard (5–5) Clay (9–2) Grass (0–0) Carpet (0–0)	Matches by type Singles (8–6) Doubles (6–1)	Matches by setting Indoors (3–4) Outdoors (11–3)

=== Singles: 14 (8–6) ===
Edition	Stage	Date	Location	Against	Surface	Opponent	W/L	Score
2016	Z1 RR	Feb 2016	Eilat (ISR)	Belgium	Hard	Alison Van Uytvanck	L	1–6, 3–6
2016	Z1 RR	Feb 2016	Eilat (ISR)	Latvia	Hard	Diāna Marcinkeviča	W	6–4, 6–4
2016	Z1 RPO	Feb 2016	Eilat (ISR)	South Africa	Hard	Ilze Hattingh	W	6–0, 6–1
2018	Z1 RR	Feb 2018	Tallinn (EST)	Slovenia	Hard (i)	Nina Potočnik	L	4–6, 2–6
2019	Z1 RR	Feb 2019	Bath (GBR)	Greece	Hard (i)	Maria Sakkari	L	3–6, 2–6
2019	Z1 RR	Feb 2019	Bath (GBR)	Slovenia	Hard (i)	Dalila Jakupović	W	4–6, 6–1, 6–4
2019	Z1 RR	Feb 2019	Bath (GBR)	(United Kingdom) Great Britain	Hard (i)	Johanna Konta	L	2–6, 7–6^{(7–1)}, 6–7^{(4–7)}
2022	Z1 RR	Apr 2022	Antalya (TUR)	Turkey	Clay	İpek Öz	L	4–6, 4–6
2022	Z1 RR	Apr 2022	Antalya (TUR)	Estonia	Clay	Maileen Nuudi	W	6–1, 6–3
2022	Z1 PPO	Apr 2022	Antalya (TUR)	Slovenia	Clay	Živa Falkner	W	6–4, 6–2
2022	PO	Nov 2022	Oradea (ROU)	Romania	Hard (i)	Jaqueline Cristian	L	2–6, 6–4, 6–7^{(3–7)}
2023	Z1 RR	Apr 2023	Antalya (TUR)	Egypt	Clay	Sandra Samir	W	6–1, 6–2
2023	Z1 RR	Apr 2023	Antalya (TUR)	Turkey	Clay	İpek Öz	W	4–6, 6–4, 7–5
2023	Z1 RR	Apr 2023	Antalya (TUR)	Netherlands	Clay	Lesley Pattinama Kerkhove	W	6–3, 6–3

=== Doubles: 7 (6–1) ===
Edition	Stage	Date	Location	Against	Surface	Partner	Opponents	W/L	Score
2015	Z1 RR	Feb 2015	Budapest (HUN)	Austria	Hard (i)	Tímea Babos	Julia Grabher; Sandra Klemenschits	W	7–6^{(7–2)}, 6–2
2018	Z1 RR	Feb 2018	Tallinn (EST)	Croatia	Hard (i)	Réka Luca Jani	Darija Jurak; Tena Lukas	W	3–2 ret.
2022	Z1 RR	Apr 2022	Antalya (TUR)	Denmark	Clay	Amarissa Kiara Tóth	Sofia Samavati; Johanne Svendsen	W	6–2, 6–4
2022	Z1 RR	Apr 2022	Antalya (TUR)	Serbia	Clay	Panna Udvardy	Aleksandra Krunić; Dejana Radanović	W	6–3, 6–2
2023	Z1 RR	Apr 2023	Antalya (TUR)	Turkey	Clay	Dalma Gálfi	Berfu Cengiz; İpek Öz	L	7–6^{(7–4)}, 4–6, 2–6
2023	Z1 RR	Apr 2023	Antalya (TUR)	Latvia	Clay	Dalma Gálfi	Diāna Marcinkēviča; Daniela Vismane	W	6–1, 6–2
2023	Z1 RR	Apr 2023	Antalya (TUR)	Netherlands	Clay	Dalma Gálfi	Suzan Lamens; Bibiane Schoofs	W	4–6, 6–3, 6–2

== Best Grand Slam results details ==
=== Singles ===
Australian Open
2023
Round	Opponent	Rank	Score	ABR
1R	(Romania) Ana Bogdan	63	6–2, 2–6, 6–3	81
2R	(Latvia) Jeļena Ostapenko (17)	17	6–7^{(5–7)}, 7–5, 0–6	81
2026
Round	Opponent	Rank	Score	ABR
1R	(United States) Elizabeth Mandlik (WC)	182	6–0, 6–4	74
2R	(Turkey) Zeynep Sönmez (Q)	112	2–6, 4–6	74

Wimbledon Championships
2022
Round	Opponent	Rank	Score	ABR
1R	(Ukraine) Anhelina Kalinina	34	6–4, 2–6, 4–6	64
2023
Round	Opponent	Rank	Score	ABR
1R	(Canada) Bianca Andreescu	50	3–6, 6–3, 2–6	110
2025
Round	Opponent	Rank	Score	ABR
1R	(Ukraine) Elina Svitolina (14)	13	3–6, 1–6	75
2026
Round	Opponent	Rank	Score	ABR
1R	(Argentina) Solana Sierra	56	3–6, 7–5, 5–7	74

French Open
2025
Round	Opponent	Rank	Score	ABR
1R	(Germany) Laura Siegemund	107	7–6^{(7–2)}, 6–3	82
2R	(Ukraine) Elina Svitolina (13)	14	6–7^{(4–7)}, 5–7	82

US Open
2024
Round	Opponent	Rank	Score	ABR
1R	(United States) Bernarda Pera	79	6–3, 3–6, 6–3	84
2R	Anna Kalinskaya (15)	15	2–6, 4–6	84
2025
Round	Opponent	Rank	Score	ABR
1R	(Ukraine) Elina Svitolina (12)	15	6–2, 6–4	97
2R	(Greece) Maria Sakkari	64	3–6, 1–6	97

=== Doubles ===
Australian Open
2023
with (Belgium) Greet Minnen
Round	Opponents	Rank	Score	ABR
1R	(Poland) Alicja Rosolska (14) (New Zealand) Erin Routliffe (14)	32; 31	6–4, 6–1	50
2R	(Switzerland) Viktorija Golubic (Romania) Monica Niculescu	88; 53	4–6, 1–6	50
2024
with (Hungary) Tímea Babos
Round	Opponents	Rank	Score	ABR
1R	(Italy) Angelica Moratelli (PR) (United Kingdom) Samantha Murray Sharan (PR)	78; 272	4–6, 6–1, 7–5	55
2R	(France) Caroline Garcia (France) Kristina Mladenovic	70; 66	4–6, 2–6	55

Wimbledon Championships
2023
with (Belgium) Greet Minnen
Round	Opponents	Rank	Score	ABR
1R	(United States) Makenna Jones (WC) (United States) Sloane Stephens (WC)	107; 336	6–2, 7–6^{(7–4)}	50
2R	(United States) Desirae Krawczyk (5) (Netherlands) Demi Schuurs (5)	10; 12	6–4, 4–6, 6–4	50
3R	(Czech Republic) Marie Bouzková (Spain) Sara Sorribes Tormo	65; 92	3–6, 6–3, 3–6	50

French Open
2022
with (Belgium) Greet Minnen
Round	Opponents	Rank	Score	ABR
1R	(France) Alizé Cornet (France) Diane Parry	95; 248	Walkover	120
2R	(Hungary) Dalma Gálfi (Russia) Anna Kalinskaya	185; 85	7–5, 6–3	120
3R	(Poland) Alicja Rosolska (New Zealand) Erin Routliffe	53; 37	6–7^{(4–7)}, 7–5, 7–5	120
QF	(United States) Coco Gauff (8) (United States) Jessica Pegula (8)	10; 31	4–6, 6–4, 4–6	120
2023
with (Belgium) Greet Minnen
Round	Opponents	Rank	Score	ABR
1R	(Egypt) Mayar Sherif (Slovenia) Tamara Zidanšek	271; 67	7–5, 5–7, 6–4	47
2R	(Japan) Shuko Aoyama (7) (Japan) Ena Shibahara (7)	20; 21	6–4, 6–4	47
3R	(United States) Asia Muhammad (12) (Mexico) Giuliana Olmos (12)	35; 17	6–3, 1–6, 6–2	47
QF	(United States) Coco Gauff (2) (United States) Jessica Pegula (2)	3; 2	2–6, 6–7^{(2–7)}	47

US Open
2022
with (Belgium) Greet Minnen
Round	Opponents	Rank	Score	ABR
1R	(China) Wang Xinyu (Alt) (China) Zhu Lin (Alt)	88; 217	7–5, 3–6, 6–4	54
2R	(Ukraine) Lyudmyla Kichenok (4) (Latvia) Jeļena Ostapenko (4)	11; 9	6–0, 2–6, 6–7^{(3–10)}	54

== Wins against top 10 players ==
No.	Player	Rk	Event	Surface	Rd	Score	Rk	Years	Ref
1.	(Ukraine) Elina Svitolina	7	Madrid Open, Spain	Clay	2R	6–3, 6–4	63	2026	

- Key: (Rk) first use, opponent rank; (Rd) round; (Rk) 2nd use, player rank; (Ref) reference; (F) final; (SF) semifinal; (QF) quarterfinal; (#R) rounds 4, 3, 2, 1; (RR) round-robin stage; (Q#) qualifying rounds or stages (3), 2, 1.
