= Sofia Samavati =

Danish tennis player

- Full name: Sofia Nami Samavati
- Country (sports): Denmark
- Born: 14 February 2000 (age 26)
- Plays: Right (two-handed backhand)
- Prize money: $34,079

Singles
- Career record: 108–64
- Career titles: 3 ITF
- Highest ranking: No. 272 (7 November 2022)

Doubles
- Career record: 1–14
- Highest ranking: No. 1,653 (12 September 2022)

Team competitions
- Fed Cup: 4–4

Sofia Nami Samavati (born 14 February 2000) is a Danish inactive tennis player. She is of Iranian descent.

Samavati has a career-high singles ranking by the Women's Tennis Association (WTA) of 272, achieved on 7 November 2022. She won three singles titles on the ITF Women's Circuit.

Competing for Denmark in the Fed Cup, Samavati has a win-loss record of 4–4.

== ITF Circuit finals ==
=== Singles: 6 (3 titles, 3 runner-ups) ===
Legend $60,000 tournaments $25,000 tournaments $15,000 tournaments	Finals by surface Hard (1–0) Clay (2–3)

Result	W–L	Date	Tournament	Tier	Surface	Opponent	Score
Loss	0–1	Aug 2021	ITF Erwitte, Germany	15,000	Clay	(Germany) Julia Middendorf	6–3, 5–7, 2–6
Win	1–1	Aug 2021	ITF Wanfercée-Baulet, Belgium	15,000	Clay	(Norway) Astrid Wanja; Brune Olsen	4–6, 6–3, 6–1
Win	2–1	Jan 2022	GB Pro-Series Loughborough, UK	25,000	Hard (i)	(Georgia (country)) Mariam Bolkvadze	6–2, 5–5 ret.
Loss	2–2	Mar 2022	ITF Gonesse, France	15,000	Clay (i)	(Belgium) Lara Salden	2–6, 6–7^{(6)}
Win	3–2	May 2022	ITF Varberg, Sweden	25,000	Clay	(Norway) Malene Helgø	2–6, 6–1, 6–4
Loss	3–3	Jun 2022	ITF Ystad, Sweden	25,000	Clay	(Latvia) Darja Semenistaja	6–3, 3–6, 1–6
