= 2012 Monterrey Open – Singles =

Singles
- 2012 Monterrey Open

Final
- Champion: (Hungary) Tímea Babos
- Runner-up: (Romania) Alexandra Cadanțu
- Score: 6-4, 6-4

Details
- Draw: 32
- Seeds: 8

Events
Singles	Doubles
- Monterrey Open

Anastasia Pavlyuchenkova is the defending champion, but decided to participate at the Dubai Tennis Championships instead.

Tímea Babos won her first WTA title after defeating Alexandra Cadanțu 6–4, 6–4 in the final.

== Seeds ==
1. (Italy) Roberta Vinci (second round)
2. (Italy) Sara Errani (semifinals)
3. (Romania) Sorana Cîrstea (second round)
4. (Romania) Alexandra Dulgheru (first round)
5. (Argentina) Gisela Dulko (first round)
6. (Hungary) Gréta Arn (semifinals)
7. (France) Mathilde Johansson (first round)
8. (Spain) Lourdes Domínguez Lino (quarterfinals)

== Draw ==
Key

- Q = Qualifier
- WC = Wild card
- LL = Lucky loser
- Alt = Alternate
- ITF = ITF entry
- PR = Protected ranking
- SR = Special ranking
- SE = Special exempt
- JE = Junior exempt
- JR = Junior Accelerator Programme entrant
- CO = College Accelerator Programme entrant
- NG = Next Gen Accelerator Program entrant
- w/o = Walkover
- r = Retired
- d = Defaulted

=== Finals ===
Semifinals
6	(Hungary) Gréta Arn	2	6	5
(Romania) Alexandra Cadanțu	6	4	7
(Hungary) Tímea Babos	6	6^{3}	6
2	(Italy) Sara Errani	4	7^{7}	4

Final
(Romania) Alexandra Cadanțu	4	4
(Hungary) Tímea Babos	6	6

=== Top half ===
First round
1	(Italy) R Vinci	7	7
(United States) C Vandeweghe	5	5
(Russia) N Bratchikova	6	6
(Russia) A Pivovarova	3	1
(Russia) A Panova	5	4
Q	(Croatia) M Abramović	7	6
(China) S Zhang	1	4
6	(Hungary) G Arn	6	6
4	(Romania) A Dulgheru	3	4
(Spain) S Soler Espinosa	6	6
(Romania) A Cadanțu	3	6	7
(Australia) J Dokić	6	1	5
(Russia) V Savinykh	6	6
(Japan) K Date-Krumm	2	3
Q	(Puerto Rico) Monica Puig	3	3
8	(Spain) L Domínguez Lino	6	6

Second round
1	(Italy) R Vinci	5	5
(Russia) N Bratchikova	7	7
Q	(Croatia) M Abramović	4	2
6	(Hungary) G Arn	6	6
(Spain) S Soler Espinosa	6^{7}	3
(Romania) A Cadanțu	7^{9}	6
(Russia) V Savinykh	4	2
8	(Spain) L Domínguez Lino	6	6

Quarterfinals
(Russia) N Bratchikova	1	6^{6}
6	(Hungary) G Arn	6	7^{8}
(Romania) A Cadanțu	6	6
8	(Spain) L Domínguez Lino	2	0

Semifinals
6	(Hungary) G Arn	2	6	5
(Romania) A Cadanțu	6	4	7

=== Bottom half ===
First round
5	(Argentina) G Dulko	4	6^{2}
(Austria) P Mayr-Achleitner	6	7^{7}
Q	(Hungary) K Marosi	6^{3}	4
(Czech Republic) E Birnerová	7^{7}	6
WC	(Mexico) X Hermoso	2	3
(Hungary) T Babos	6	6
(Switzerland) S Vögele	3	6	5
3/WC	(Romania) S Cîrstea	6	2	7
7	(France) M Johansson	1	7	6^{5}
(Luxembourg) M Minella	6	5	7^{7}
WC	(Kazakhstan) Y Shvedova	6	4	6
Q	(Kazakhstan) S Karatantcheva	1	6	3
(France) A Cornet	6	7^{7}
(United States) T Luzhanska	4	6^{3}
(Canada) S Dubois	2	2
2	(Italy) S Errani	6	6

Second round
(Austria) P Mayr-Achleitner	6	6
(Czech Republic) E Birnerová	1	3
(Hungary) T Babos	4	6	6
3/WC	(Romania) S Cîrstea	6	4	2
(Luxembourg) M Minella	6	6^{1}	6
WC	(Kazakhstan) Y Shvedova	3	7^{7}	4
(France) A Cornet	2	3
2	(Italy) S Errani	6	6

Quarterfinals
(Austria) P Mayr-Achleitner	4	2
(Hungary) T Babos	6	6
(Luxembourg) M Minella	1	2
2	(Italy) S Errani	6	6

Semifinals
(Hungary) T Babos	6	6^{3}	6
2	(Italy) S Errani	4	7^{7}	4

== Qualifying ==
=== Seeds ===
1. (Kazakhstan) Sesil Karatantcheva (qualified)
2. (Spain) Estrella Cabeza Candela (second round)
3. (Slovenia) Petra Rampre (first round)
4. (Argentina) Florencia Molinero (first round)
5. (Puerto Rico) Monica Puig (qualified)
6. (Colombia) Mariana Duque-Mariño (first round)
7. (Canada) Sharon Fichman (second round)
8. (Ukraine) Mariya Koryttseva (first round)

=== Qualifiers ===
1. (Kazakhstan) Sesil Karatantcheva
2. (Croatia) Maria Abramović
3. (Hungary) Katalin Marosi
4. (Puerto Rico) Monica Puig

=== Draw ===
==== First qualifier ====
First round
1	(Kazakhstan) Sesil Karatantcheva	6	6
WC	(Mexico) Ivette López	1	1
(Germany) Tatjana Malek	6	6
(Spain) Garbiñe Muguruza Blanco	2	4
(Bulgaria) Aleksandrina Naydenova	6	7
(Paraguay) Verónica Cepede Royg	2	5
(Slovakia) Romana Tabak	6	6
8	(Ukraine) Mariya Koryttseva	2	2

Second round
1	(Kazakhstan) Sesil Karatantcheva	6	2	6
(Germany) Tatjana Malek	2	6	3
(Bulgaria) Aleksandrina Naydenova	6	4	4
(Slovakia) Romana Tabak	4	6	6

Qualifying competition
1	(Kazakhstan) Sesil Karatantcheva	6	6
(Slovakia) Romana Tabak	2	1

==== Second qualifier ====
First round
2	(Spain) Estrella Cabeza Candela	6^{5}	6	6
(Slovakia) Lenka Wienerová	7^{7}	3	2
(Portugal) Maria João Koehler	6	6
WC	(Mexico) Camila Fuentes	3	1
(Croatia) Darija Jurak	6	6
WC	(Mexico) Ana Sofía Sánchez	3	4
(Croatia) Maria Abramović	6	6
6	(Colombia) Mariana Duque-Mariño	2	2

Second round
2	(Spain) Estrella Cabeza Candela	3	2
(Portugal) Maria João Koehler	6	6
(Croatia) Darija Jurak	5	0
(Croatia) Maria Abramović	7	6

Qualifying competition
(Portugal) Maria João Koehler	7	3	4
(Croatia) Maria Abramović	5	6	6

==== Third qualifier ====
First round
3	(Slovenia) Petra Rampre	6	3	4
(Hungary) Katalin Marosi	3	6	6
(Spain) Leticia Costas-Moreira	6	6
(Colombia) Catalina Castaño	4	4
WC	(Mexico) Marcela Zacarías	2	6^{3}
(China) Sun Shengnan	6	7^{7}
WC	(Mexico) Ana Paula de la Peña	2	0
7	(Canada) Sharon Fichman	6	6

Second round
(Hungary) Katalin Marosi	6	6
(Spain) Leticia Costas-Moreira	3	1
(China) Sun Shengnan	7^{7}	6
7	(Canada) Sharon Fichman	6^{2}	3

Qualifying competition
(Hungary) Katalin Marosi	7^{7}	6
(China) Sun Shengnan	6^{3}	4

==== Fourth qualifier ====
First round
4	(Argentina) Florencia Molinero	1	2
(Switzerland) Amra Sadiković	6	6
(Russia) Marina Shamayko	3	6^{6}
WC	(Mexico) Nadia Abdala	6	7^{8}
(United States) Amanda Fink	5	3
(Spain) Inés Ferrer Suárez	7	6
(Chile) Andrea Koch Benvenuto	2	2
5	(Puerto Rico) Monica Puig	6	6

Second round
(Switzerland) Amra Sadiković	6	6
WC	(Mexico) Nadia Abdala	4	2
(Spain) Inés Ferrer Suárez	0	4
5	(Puerto Rico) Monica Puig	6	6

Qualifying competition
(Switzerland) Amra Sadiković	6^{6}	2
5	(Puerto Rico) Monica Puig	7^{8}	6
