= 2013 Fed Cup Americas Zone Group I – play-offs =

Tennis competition play-offs

The play-offs of the 2011 Fed Cup Americas Zone Group I were the final stages of the Group I Zonal Competition involving teams from the Americas. Using the positions determined in their pools, the nine teams faced off to determine their placing in the 2013 Fed Cup Americas Zone Group I, the top countries of each pool played for first to second, while the bottom two of each pool competed for sixth and ninth. The top team advanced to World Group II play-offs, and the bottom two teams were relegated down to the Americas Zone Group II for the next year.

== Pool Standings ==
| Placing | Pool A | Pool B |
|---|---|---|
| 1 | Canada | Brazil |
| 2 | Colombia | Paraguay |
| 3 | Venezuela | Chile |
| 4 | Peru | Mexico |

== Promotion play-offs ==
The first placed teams of each pool were drawn in a head-to-head round. The winner of the round advanced to the World Group II play-offs, where they would get a chance to advanced to World Group II.

=== Brazil vs. Canada ===
Brazil
1
Country Club de Ejecutivos, Medellín, Colombia
February 9, 2013
Red clay (outdoors)

Canada
2

| | | | 1 | 2 | 3 |
|---|---|---|---|---|---|
| 1 | (Brazil) (Canada) | Paula Cristina Gonçalves; Sharon Fichman | 0; 6 | 6; 0 | 6; 4 |
| 2 | (Brazil) (Canada) | Teliana Pereira; Eugenie Bouchard | 2; 6 | 2; 6 |
| 3 | (Brazil) (Canada) | Teliana Pereira / Laura Pigossi; Gabriela Dabrowski / Sharon Fichman | 6^{4} 7^{7} | 5; 7 |

== 3rd to 4th play-offs ==
The second placed teams of each pool were drawn in head-to-head rounds to find the third and fourth placed teams.

=== Colombia vs. Paraguay ===
Colombia
1
Country Club de Ejecutivos, Medellín, Colombia
February 9, 2013
Red clay (outdoors)

Paraguay
2

| | | | 1 | 2 | 3 |
|---|---|---|---|---|---|---|
| 1 | (Colombia) (Paraguay) | Laura Ucrós; Montserrat González | 6; 3 | 6^{2} 7^{7} | | retired |
| 2 | (Colombia) (Paraguay) | Yuliana Lizarazo; Camila Giangreco Campiz | 6^{6} 7^{8} | 6; 1 | 6; 3 |
| 3 | (Colombia) (Paraguay) | Mariana Duque Mariño / Yuliana Lizarazo; Montserrat González / Verónica Cepede Royg | 2; 6 | 3; 6 |

== Relegation play-offs ==
The last placed teams of each pool were drawn in head-to-head rounds. The loser of each round was relegated down to Americas Zone Group II in 2013.

=== Venezuela vs. Chile ===
Venezuela
2
Country Club de Ejecutivos, Medellín, Colombia
February 9, 2013
Red clay (outdoors)

Chile
1

| | | | 1 | 2 | 3 |
|---|---|---|---|---|---|
| 1 | (Venezuela) (Chile) | Andrea Gámiz; Cecilia Costa Melgar | 6; 2 | 6; 2 |
| 2 | (Venezuela) (Chile) | Adriana Pérez; Fernanda Brito | 3; 6 | 4; 6 |
| 3 | (Venezuela) (Chile) | Andrea Gámiz / Adriana Pérez; Cecilia Costa Melgar / Fernanda Brito | 6; 2 | 6; 3 |

=== Peru vs. Mexico ===
Peru
0
Country Club de Ejecutivos, Medellín, Colombia
February 9, 2013
Red clay (outdoors)

Mexico
3

| | | | 1 | 2 | 3 |
|---|---|---|---|---|---|
| 1 | (Peru) (Mexico) | Ferny Ángeles Paz; Marcela Zacarías | 3; 6 | 3; 6 |
| 2 | (Peru) (Mexico) | Patricia Kú Flores; Ana Sofía Sánchez | 2; 6 | 3; 6 |
| 3 | (Peru) (Mexico) | Ferny Ángeles Paz / Ximena Siles Luna; Ana Paula de la Peña / Ximena Hermoso | 1; 6 | 4; 6 |

== Final placements ==
| Placing | Teams |
| Promoted | Canada |
| Second | Brazil |
| Third | Paraguay |
| Fourth | Colombia |
| Fifth | Mexico |
| Fifth | Venezuela |
| Relegated | Peru |
| Relegated | Chile |

- Canada advanced to World Group II play-offs.
- Peru and Chile were relegated down to 2014 Fed Cup Americas Zone Group II.

== See also ==
- Fed Cup structure
