= Laura Pigossi =

Brazilian tennis player (born 1994)

- Pigossi at the 2026 Wimbledon Championships
- Full name: Laura Pigossi Herrmann de Andrade
- Country (sports): Brazil
- Residence: Barcelona, Spain
- Born: 2 August 1994 (age 32) São Paulo, Brazil
- Height: 1.64 m (5 ft 5 in)
- Plays: Right (two-handed backhand)
- Coach: Germán Puentes
- Prize money: $1,394,737

Singles
- Career record: 454–396
- Career titles: 1 WTA 125
- Highest ranking: No. 100 (29 August 2022)
- Current ranking: No. 218 (14 September 2026)

Grand Slam singles results
- Australian Open: 1R (2023)
- French Open: 1R (2024)
- Wimbledon: 1R (2022)
- US Open: Q2 (2025)

Other tournaments
- Olympic Games: 1R (2024)

Doubles
- Career record: 434–250
- Career titles: 4 WTA 125
- Highest ranking: No. 79 (24 August 2026)
- Current ranking: No. 86 (14 September 2026)

Grand Slam doubles results
- Australian Open: 1R (2026)
- French Open: 1R (2026)
- Wimbledon: 1R (2026)
- US Open: 1R (2026)

Team competitions
- Fed Cup: 10–15
Medal record
Women's tennis
Representing Brazil
Olympic Games
Bronze medal – third place	2020 Tokyo	Doubles
Pan American Games
Gold medal – first place	2023 Santiago	Singles
Gold medal – first place	2023 Santiago	Doubles
South American Games
Bronze medal – third place	2014 Santiago	Doubles
- Last updated on: 16 September 2026.

Laura Pigossi Herrmann de Andrade (Portuguese: [ˈlawɾɐ piˈɡɔsi]; born 2 August 1994) is a Brazilian professional tennis player. She has a career-high singles ranking of No. 100 by the WTA, achieved on 29 August 2022, and a best doubles ranking of world No. 79, reached on 24 August 2026. Her most notable achievement was a bronze medal at the 2020 Tokyo Olympics in doubles, with Luisa Stefani.

Pigossi plays mostly on the WTA Challenger Tour, where she has won one title in singles and four in doubles. On the ITF Circuit, she earned twelve singles and 44 doubles titles.

Pigossi has represented Brazil in multiple international competitions and has spoken positively about competing in her home country. Playing for Brazil Billie Jean King Cup team since 2013, Pigossi has a win-loss record of 10–15 in BJK Cup competition, as of July 2026.

== Career highlights ==
=== Juniors ===
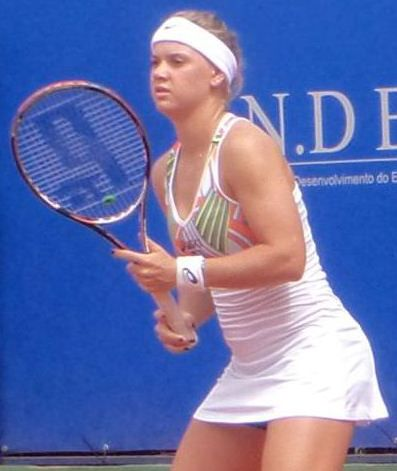
Laura Pigossi at the ITF São Paulo, 2014.

Pigossi started playing tennis at the age of six at Club Athletico Paulistano in São Paulo, following her father and brother in the sport.

In 2009, at age 14, she travelled to compete on the ITF Junior Circuit, participating in the junior events at the US Open, Wimbledon and Roland Garros. In that same season, Pigossi earned her first points on the professional circuit.

On that period, Pigossi was studying at the Dante Alighieri school in São Paulo, but as she was already playing tennis, she and her family had an agreement that Pigossi had to make up for the missed classes. Then, Pigossi and her family decided to take her out of in-person schooling and she started to study remotely.

At the age of 15, she moved to Barcelona, where her brother had attempted to pursue tennis and later education.

=== Professional ===
==== 2013 ====
Pigossi made her debut for Brazil in the Fed Cup (now Billie Jean King Cup).

==== 2017 ====
Partnering with Nadia Podoroska of Argentina, Pigossi reached the quarterfinals of the doubles draw at the Rabat Grand Prix in Morocco, where they were defeated by Tímea Babos and Andrea Sestini Hlaváčková, the top seeds.

==== 2019 ====
In October in Lagos, Nigeria, Pigossi won two consecutive ITF doubles titles, her 35th and 36th titles, which helped her break into the top 150 of the world doubles rankings.

==== 2020–2021: Olympics doubles bronze medal, third longest game in history ====
In April 2021, Pigossi competed at the W25 event in Córdoba, and in her opening match she lost to Russian player Amina Anshba with scores of 7–5, 3–6, 7–5, in a contest that lasted 4 hours and 53 minutes, becoming the third-longest match in the history of professional women's tennis.

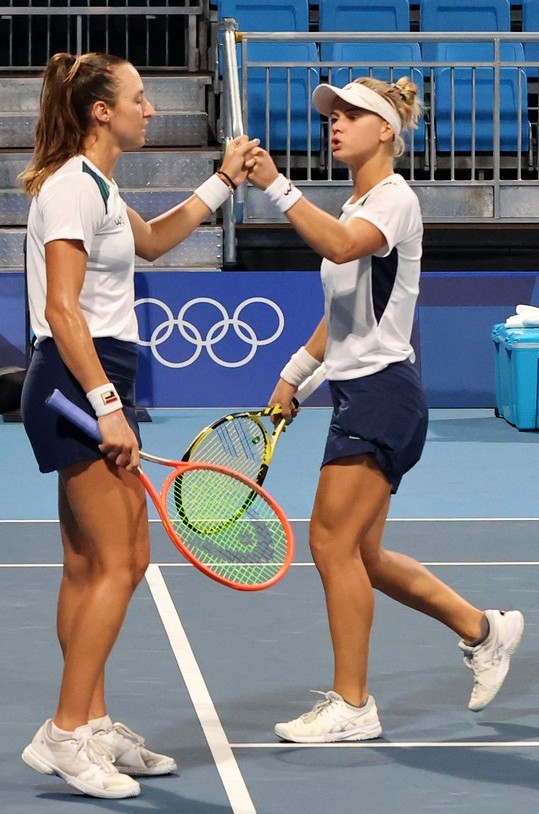
Pigossi and Luisa Stefani at the 2020 Summer Olympics

Pigossi is an Olympic bronze medallist from the 2020 Tokyo Olympics in the doubles event. She and partne Luisa Stefani defeated Veronika Kudermetova and defending gold medallist Elena Vesnina to win the bronze medal. Pigossi and Stefani became the first Brazilians to obtain an Olympic medal in tennis history, surpassing Fernando Meligeni's campaign that took 4th place in 1996.

The medal was one of the most unexpected: the Brazilians got an Olympic spot at the last minute, confirmed one week before the Games opened, with Stefani ranked No. 23 in the doubles ranking and Pigossi only at No. 190. Although the Brazilian pair had lost in the only game they played together before, during the overall campaign they managed to save eight match points. In addition to the four in the bronze-medal match, they saved another four in the match against Czech duo Karolína Plíšková/Markéta Vondroušová in the round of 16.

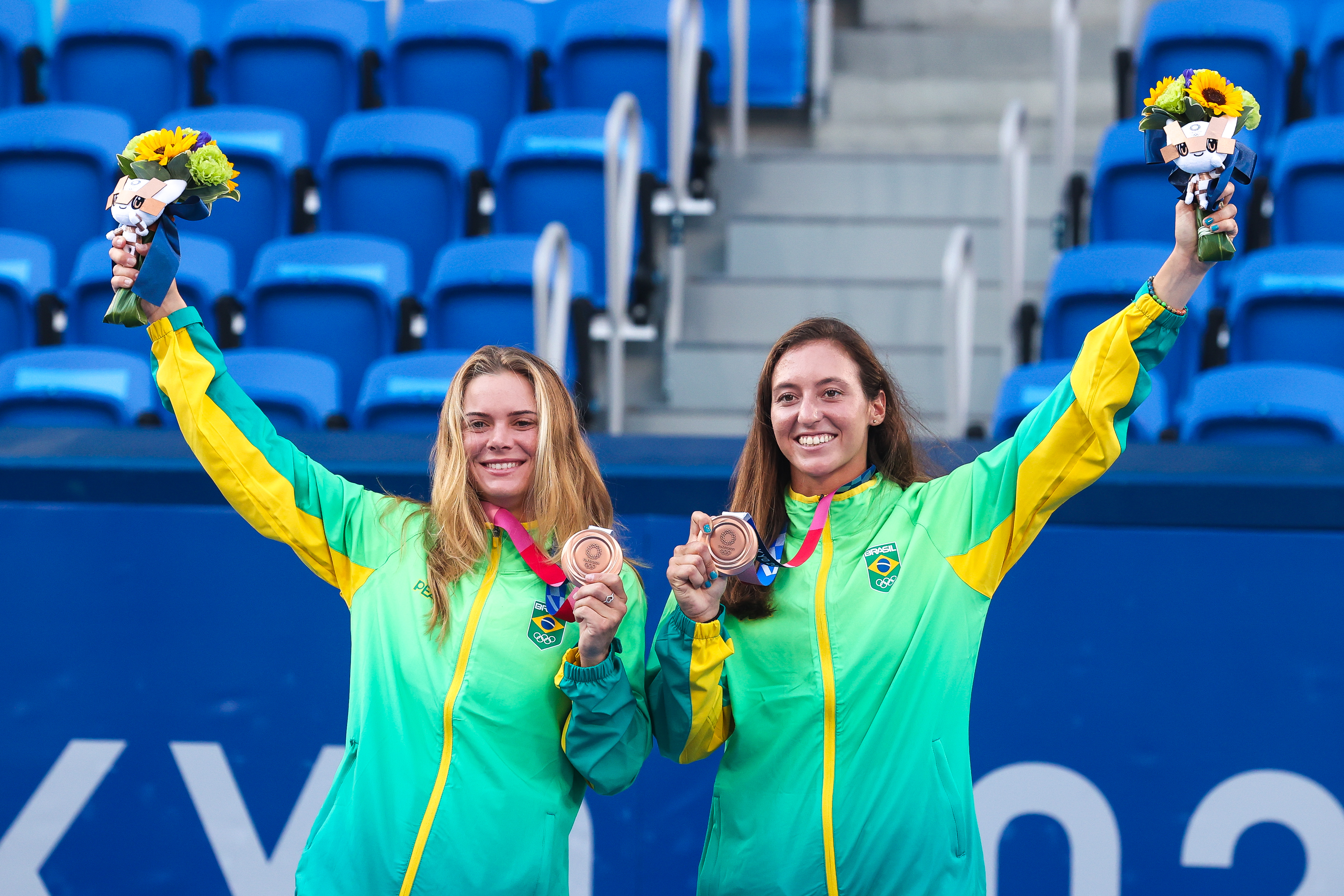
Pigossi with Luisa Stefani on the podium of the 2020 Summer Olympics

==== 2022: Wimbledon debut, top 100, first WTA Tour final ====
In 2022, she played her first qualifying competition at a major at the Australian Open. Pigossi had her first WTA Tour-level wins at Copa Colsanitas in Bogotá, Colombia, coming from the qualifying rounds and reaching the finals. The campaign in Bogotá included wins against Dayana Yastremska in the quarterfinals and top seed Camila Osorio in the semifinals before losing the final to Tatjana Maria. Consequently, Pigossi reached a new career-high of world No. 126 in the singles rankings on 11 April 2022.

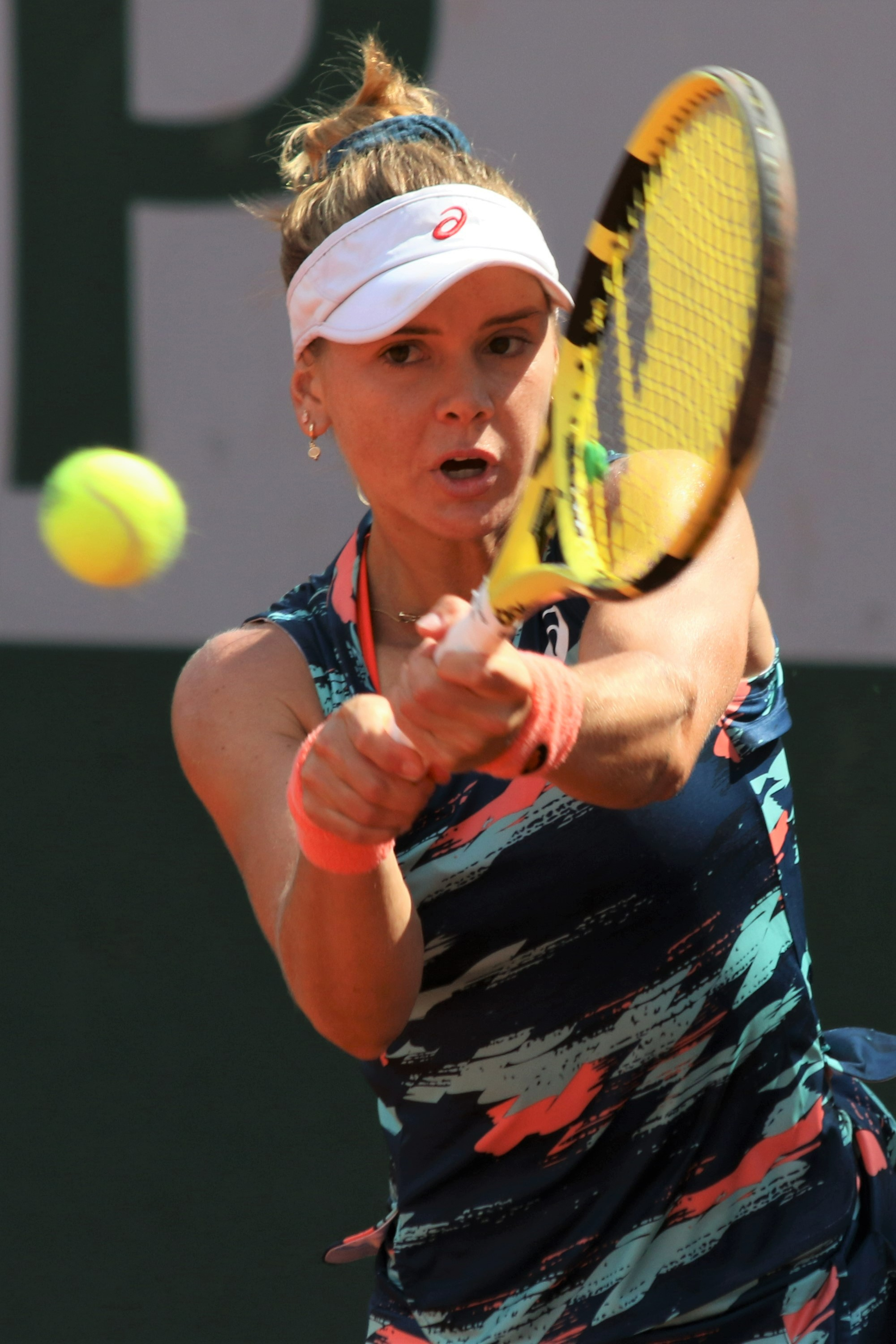
Pigossi in the 2022 French Open qualifying

In May, she reached two second rounds at WTA 125-level in Saint-Malo and Karlsruhe. At the French Open, Pigossi made the qualifying draw as the 16th seed. In June, she made her major debut at Wimbledon. At the Guadalajara Open, she made her main-draw debut at the WTA 1000-level as a lucky loser.

==== 2023–2024: Pan American gold, WTA 125 titles ====
She also made her debut at the main draw of the Australian Open as a lucky loser. In August, Pigossi won an 60k event in Feira de Santana, Brazil. During the 2023 Pan American Games in Santiago, Pigossi won both the women's singles and doubles, the first Brazilian to ever do so – as well as the third to medal in both events after Maria Bueno and Gisele Miró – and earning her a spot in the 2024 Olympics singles tournament. Pigossi earned her first WTA 125 singles title by winning the Argentina Open in Buenos Aires.

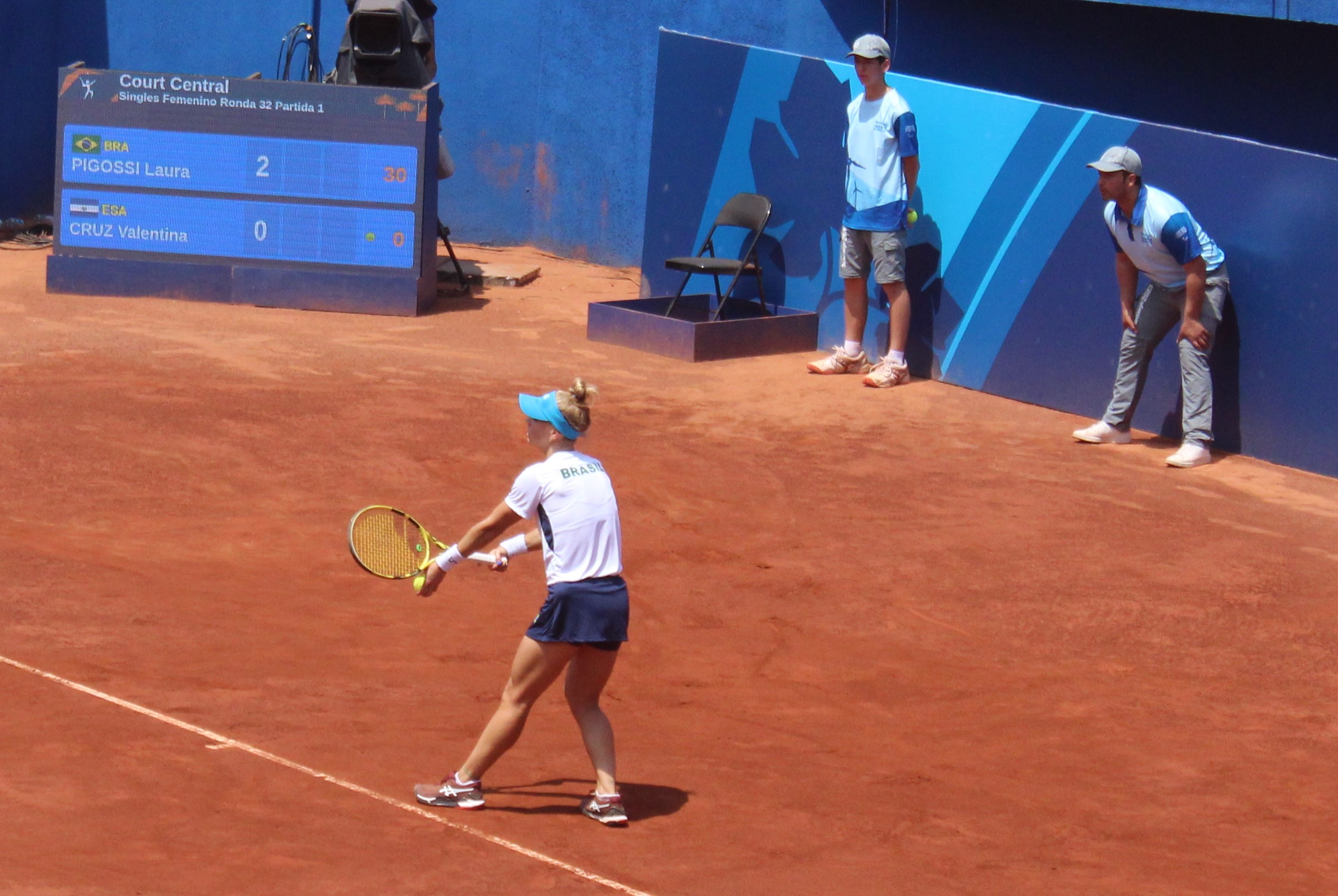
Pigossi at the 2023 Pan American Games

Pigossi started the 2024 season with a first-round loss at the Canberra International. In doubles, she partnered with Alexandra Eala and advanced to the semifinals where they lost in straight sets. She reached her second WTA 125 doubles final in San Luis Potosí with Polish partner Katarzyna Piter, but they withdrew on the day of the final due to Pigossi’s knee injury. At the Copa Colsanitas, Pigossi won her opening match against fifth seed Nadia Podoroska, before losing her next match to Irina Bara. She claimed her ninth ITF title at the W50 event in Pretoria, South Africa, defeating Hanne Vandewinkel in the final.

During the Billie Jean King Cup (BJK Cup) qualifier against Germany in São Paulo in April 2024, Pigossi lost a three-set battle to Tatjana Maria, and withdrew from the following day’s match against Laura Siegemund due to pain. In May, she made her debut at the French Open, after qualifying for the main draw. At the Olympics, she was defeated in her opening match by Ukrainian Dayana Yastremska. In front of her home crowd, Pigossi won the singles title of the W75 São Paulo tournament.

In November at the BJK Cup tie between Brazil and Argentina, Pigossi fell in three sets to Solana Sierra. She also lost her second match to Jazmín Ortenzi. Partnering Maja Chwalińska, Pigossi won the doubles title at the WTA 125 MundoTenis Open in December, defeating Nicole Fossa Huergo and Valeriya Strakhova in the final. This was her last tournament in the 2024 season and the first WTA 125 doubles title, her biggest achievement in doubles to date.

==== 2025: First two WTA 250 doubles finals, top 80 on doubles, two WTA 125 doubles titles ====
Pigossi began the 2025 season at the Auckland Open in New Zealand where she was defeated in the opening round of qualifying by Sachia Vickery. She then lost in the first round of the doubles draw at the same event. At the Australian Open, she won her first match in qualifying but lost her second.

In April, Pigossi participated in the 2025 Copa Colsanitas in Bogotá, Colombia. In the singles draw, she had a three-set comeback victory against No. 5 seed Laura Siegemund but lost in the second round to Katarzyna Kawa, having been with a match point in the second set. In doubles, Pigossi and Irina Bara made the final losing there to Sara Sorribes Tormo and Cristina Bucșa in a tiebreak. This was Pigossi's first doubles final at the WTA 250-level and her biggest to date.

In the US Open qualifying, Pigossi lost to Emerson Jones in the second round.

Pigossi participated in the first edition of the SP Open, a WTA 250 in her hometown of São Paulo. Playing alongside Ingrid Martins, she was runner-up losing in three sets to Luisa Stefani and Tímea Babos. This was the first time that Pigossi reached a WTA Tour final on hardcourts in either singles or doubles. In singles, she advanced to the round of 16 but lost to Haddad Maia, in straight sets.

Pigossi returned to the Clube Paineiras do Morumby to defend her title at the São Paulo Torneio Internacional de Tênis Feminino, this time at the W35 level, and she defeated Carolina Alves in a three-sets final and three hours and 48 minutes of play.

Again partnering with Martins, Pigossi went to play at two WTA 125 events in Brazil in the month of October. At the first edition of Martins' hometown tournament, the Rio Ladies Open, Martins and Pigossi reached the semifinals but were defeated by Leyre Romero Gormaz and Tara Würth, in straight sets. Pigossi also lost her opening singles match to Julia Grabher, in straight sets.

The following week, they played at the MundoTenis Open in Florianópolis, where they lost in the second round to Irene Burillo and Ekaterine Gorgodze, in three sets. In singles, Pigossi reached the round of 16 and lost to Alice Ramé.

Pigossi then played at two more WTA 125 events in South America. First in Cali, Colombia, she reached the round of 16 but lost in straight sets to Sára Bejlek. Partnering with fellow Brazilian Ana Candiotto, she won the final against Ekaterine Gorgodze and Nicole Fossa Huergo, in straight sets.

In the first edition of the WTA 125 Tucumán Open in Argentina, she los in the first roundt to Argentine Carla Markus, in straight sets. Partnering with French player Carole Monnet, she reached the semifinals before losing to Valeriya Strakhova and Alicia Herrero Linana in three sets.

Then, Pigossi went to Hobart, Australia to join the BJK Cup team competing in the play-offs. On the first day, Pigossi faced Portugal’s Francisca Jorge (world No. 202) and won in straight sets. With Brazil’s victory already secured, the tie was concluded at 3–0 following a doubles victory by Luisa Stefani and Ingrid Martins, who defeated Inês Murta and Angelina Voloshchuk in three sets. On the second day, she faced Australian Maya Joint in the second match of the tie. Pigossi took the first set 6–2, but the match was interrupted for nearly two hours due to heavy rain in Hobart. After the resumption of the second set, Pigossi led by a break and even held a match point, but she was broken while serving for the match. From that moment, Joint took control of the match, defeating Pigossi in two hours and six minutes, securing Australia’s qualification for the 2026 Qualifying Round.

Then, Pigossi went to Colina, Chile to play there at the WTA 125 tournament. She reached the round of 16 in singles and was defeated by third seed Léolia Jeanjean in three sets. In doubles, alongside Alicia Herrero, she reached the semifinals, losing to María Lourdes Carlé and Sara Sorribes in two sets.

Pigossi then went to Buenos Aires for the WTA 125 Argentina Open. In singles, she lost in the first round in two sets againts Varvara Lepchenko. Alongside Alicia Herrero, she beat Nicole Fossa Huergo and Laura Samson in two sets in the final, securing her third WTA 125 title in doubles.

Her last tournament of the season was the WTA 125 Quito Open in Ecuador. In the singles draw, Pigossi reached the round of 16, but was defeated by Slovenian Veronika Erjavec, fifth seed in the tournament, in two sets. Alongside Herrero, she entered directly the quarterfinals and was defeated by Ecuadorians Mell Reasco and Camila Romero in two sets that both went to tie-breaks.

Pigossi ended the season as the world No. 80 in doubles, her highest ranking to date.

==== 2026: Fourth WTA 125 title in doubles, first Australian, French Open and Wimbledon in doubles ====
At the Auckland Open, ranked world No. 201, Pigossi began her season in the qualifying draw, but was defeated in the first round by Austria’s 17-year-old Lilli Tagger (world No. 135). Pigossi lost in three sets in a match lasting 2 hours and 35 minutes.

After losing in the singles qualifying for the 2026 Australian Open, Pigossi entered the doubles draw as an alternate, this being the first participation in a major doubles tournament in her career. Alongside Sára Bejlek, she lost in the first round to Jesika Malečková and Miriam Škoch in two sets.

Also at Melbourne, Pigossi participated in the exhibition event 1 Point Slam, where she lost her first match to eventual champion, amateur tennis player Jordan Smith.

In May 2026, Pigossi reached the quarterfinals at the WTA 125 Istanbul Open losing there to Guiomar Maristany, in straight sets.

Partnering with Maria Kozyreva, she won the title by defeating Makoto Ninomiya and Anastasia Detiuc in three sets in the final. It was Pigossi’s fourth doubles title at a WTA 125 event, achieved by winning her fourth consecutive doubles final at this level.

At the French Open, Pigossi again lost in the first round of the singles qualifying draw. Then, Pigossi entered the doubles draw as an alternate, this being her first participation in doubles at this tournament. However, she and Alycia Parks lost in the first round to Elise Mertens and Zhang Shuai, in three sets.

== Personal life and off-court activities ==
Laura Pigossi has been noted for her off-court activities. In addition to her tennis career, she has been involved in a family owned burger restaurant business in Spain, which she co-founded with her older brother, Lucas Pigossi. The establishment operates in Barcelona and Madrid, and seeks introducing Brazilian style to the local market. Pigossi occasionally assists in the business during periods away from competition, performing tasks such as dishwashing and order organization..

Pigossi has lived in Barcelona for several years, sharing a residence with her brother and sister-in-law, the latter was a classmate of Pigossi during her school years and is one of her closest friends. She has cited her family as a significant source of support throughout her career and has noted that her brother played a key role in her introduction to tennis during childhood.

In addition to her involvement in the restaurant business, Pigossi has demonstrated interest in music. She plays both the guitar and the ukulele and engages in singing as a leisure activity.

Pigossi is currently in a relationship with the Zimbabwean tennis player Benjamin Lock.

Pigossi has cited the association football player Pelé and the volleyball player Bruno Rezende to be her main sporting influences outside tennis, and Victoria Azarenka, Rafael Nadal, Roger Federer and Novak Djokovic to be her main influences in tennis.

Laura Pigossi has two tattoos. One, located on her ankle, depicts the Olympic rings and was made shortly after she won the bronze medal alongside Luisa Stefani at the 2020 Olympics.

The other, on her arm and done on the same day, features an excerpt from the Brazilian national anthem, "E o teu futuro espelha essa grandeza" ("And your future reflects that greatness"). Pigossi cited that this phrase was a very important source for motivation during the Tokyo Olympic Games.

"It's a phrase I really identify with, one that really stuck with me during the Olympics this year. It was a line we always sang before the matches, even when competing for the bronze medal, before the tie-break we sang it on the court... So it's something that's very much ingrained in me and that inspires me a lot. It reminds me of Brazil, reminds me of being great, believing, trusting. For me it's very special, ." – Said Pigossi at that time

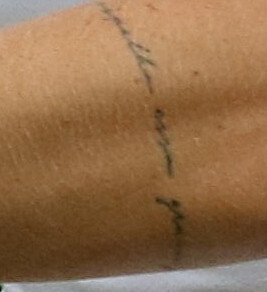
Pigossi’s arm tattoo that features an excerpt from the Brazilian national anthem

== Performance timelines ==
Key
W	F	SF	QF	#R	RR	Q#	DNQ	A	NH

(W) winner; (F) finalist; (SF) semifinalist; (QF) quarterfinalist; (#R) rounds 4, 3, 2, 1; (RR) round-robin stage; (Q#) qualification round; (DNQ) did not qualify; (A) absent; (NH) not held; (SR) strike rate (events won / competed); (W–L) win–loss record.
To avoid confusion and double counting, these charts are updated at the conclusion of a tournament or when the player's participation has ended.

Only main-draw results in WTA Tour, Grand Slam tournaments, Billie Jean King Cup, United Cup, Hopman Cup and Olympic Games are included in win–loss records.

=== Singles ===
Current through the 2026 Wimbledon Championships.

Tournament	2013	2014	2015	2016	...	2021	2022	2023	2024	2025	2026	SR	W–L
Grand Slam tournaments
Australian Open	A	A	A	A		A	Q1	1R	Q1	Q2	Q1	0 / 1	0–1
French Open	A	A	A	A		A	Q1	Q3	1R	A	Q1	0 / 1	0–1
Wimbledon	A	A	A	A		A	1R	Q1	Q1	Q1	Q1	0 / 1	0–1
US Open	A	A	A	A		A	Q1	Q1	Q1	Q2	Q1	0 / 0	0–0
Win–loss	0–0	0–0	0–0	0–0		0–0	0–1	0–1	0–1	0–0	0–0	0 / 3	0–3
National representation
Summer Olympics	NH			A		A	NH		1R	NH		0 / 1	0–1
Billie Jean King Cup (Note: Formerly known as Fed Cup until 2020.)	Z1	PO	A	A		QR (Note: Edition is split into the two years due to COVID-19.)	PO	QR	A	QR		0 / 0	4–5
WTA 1000
Qatar Open (Note: The first Premier 5 event of the year has switched back and forth between the Dubai Tennis Championships and the Qatar Ladies Open since 2009. Dubai was classified as a Premier 5 event from 2009 to 2011 before being succeeded by Doha from 2012 to 2014. In 2015, Dubai regained its Premier 5 status, while Doha was demoted to Premier status. The Premier 5 tournaments were reclassified as WTA 1000 tournaments in 2021.)	A	A	NMS	A		A	NMS	A	Q1	A	A	0 / 0	0–0
Dubai	NMS		A	NMS		A	NMS	A	A	A	A	0 / 0	0–0
Indian Wells Open	A	A	A	A		A	A	Q1	Q1	A	A	0 / 0	0–0
Miami Open	A	A	A	A		A	A	Q1	Q1	A	A	0 / 0	0–0
Madrid Open	A	A	A	A		A	A	Q1	Q1	A	A	0 / 0	0–0
Italian Open	A	A	A	A		A	A	Q1	Q2	A	A	0 / 0	0–0
Canadian Open	A	A	A	A		A	A	A	A	A	A	0 / 0	0–0
Cincinnati Open	A	A	A	A		A	A	A	A	A	A	0 / 0	0–0
Guadalajara Open	NH						1R	A	NMS	NMS		0 / 1	0–1
Pan Pacific / Wuhan Open (Note: In 2014, the Pan Pacific Open was downgraded to a Premier event and replaced by the Wuhan Open. The Premier 5 tournaments were reclassified as WTA 1000 tournaments in 2021.)	A	A	A	A	A	NH			A	A		0 / 0	0–0
China Open	A	A	A	A	A	NH		Q2	A	A		0 / 0	0–0
Win–loss	0–0	0–0	0–0	0–0		0–0	0–1	0–0	0–0	0–0		0 / 1	0–1
Career statistics
	2013	2014	2015	2016	...	2021	2022	2023	2024	2025	2026	Career	
Tournaments	0	1	0	1		0 (Note: During the season, she did not play in the main draw of any tour-level tournaments. However, she played in the Billie Jean King Cup, which is not counted as a played tournament but matches count.)	7	3	3	1		Career total: 16	
Titles	0	0	0	0		0	0	0	0	0		Career total: 0	
Finals	0	0	0	0		0	1	0	0	0		Career total: 1	
Hard win–loss	0–0	0–0	0–0	0–1		1–1	0–2	0–1	0–0	0–0		0 / 5	1–5
Clay win–loss	0–0	0–1	0–0	0–0		0–0	8–4	2–1	1–3	1–1		0 / 10	12–10
Grass win–loss	0–0	0–0	0–0	0–0		0–0	0–1	0–0	0–0	0–0		0 / 1	0–1
Overall win–loss	0–0	0–1	0–0	0–1		1–1	8–7	2–2	1–3	1–1		0 / 16	13–16
Year-end ranking (Note: 2011: WTA ranking 1134, 2012: WTA ranking 580, ... 2017: WTA ranking 402, 2018: WTA ranking 580, 2019: WTA ranking 399, 2020: WTA ranking 391.)	351	280	545	381		218	114	134	129	193		$720,592	

=== Doubles ===
Current through the 2024 WTA Tour.

Tournament	2013	2014	2015	2016	2017	2018	2019	2020	2021	2022	2023	2024	2025	2026	SR	W–L
Grand Slam tournaments
Australian Open	A	A	A	A	A	A	A	A	A	A	A	A	A	1R	0 / 1	0–1
French Open	A	A	A	A	A	A	A	A	A	A	A	A	A	1R	0 / 1	0–1
Wimbledon	A	A	A	A	A	A	A	A	A	A	A	A	A	1R	0 / 1	0–1
US Open	A	A	A	A	A	A	A	A	A	A	A	A	A	1R	0 / 1	0–1
Win–loss	0–0	0–0	0–0	0–0	0–0	0–0	0–0	0–0	0–0	0–0	0–0	0–0	0–0	0–4	0 / 4	0–4
National representation
Summer Olympics	NH			A	NH				B	NH		A	NH		0 / 1	4–1
Billie Jean King Cup	Z1	PO	A	A	A	A	A	QR		PO	QR				0 / 0	4–3
Career statistics
	2013	2014	2015	2016	2017	2018	2019	2020	2021	2022	2023	2024	2025	2026	Career	
Tournaments	1	4	2	6	3	0	8	1	1	3	1	0			Career total: 30	
Titles	0	0	0	0	0	0	0	0	0	0	0	0			Career total: 0	
Finals	0	0	0	0	0	0	0	0	0	0	0	0			Career total: 0	
Overall win-loss	1–2	3–5	2–2	2–6	1–3	0–0	4–8	0–2	4–1	3–3	2–1	0–0			0 / 30	22–33
Year-end ranking (Note: 2009: WTA ranking 957, 2010: WTA ranking 797, 2011: WTA ranking 694, 2012: WTA ranking 358.)	238	161	232	143	210	164	141	152	183	219	281	224	82			

== Olympic medal matches ==
=== Doubles: 1 (bronze medal) ===
Result	Year	Location	Surface	Partner	Opponents	Score
Bronze	2021	Tokyo Olympics, Japan	Hard	(Brazil) Luisa Stefani	(Russia) Veronika Kudermetova (Russia) Elena Vesnina	4–6, 6–4, [11–9]

== WTA Tour finals ==
=== Singles: 1 (runner-up) ===
Legend WTA 250 (0–1)	Finals by surface Clay (0–1)	Finals by setting Outdoor (0–1)

Result	W–L	Date	Tournament	Tier	Surface	Opponent	Score
Loss	0–1	Apr 2022	Copa Colsanitas, Colombia	WTA 250	Clay	(Germany) Tatjana Maria	3–6, 6–4, 2–6

=== Doubles: 2 (2 runner-ups) ===
Legend WTA 500 WTA 250 (0–2)	Finals by surface Clay (0–1) Hard (0–1)	Finals by setting Outdoor (0–2)

Result	W–L	Date	Tournament	Tier	Surface	Partner	Opponents	Score
Loss	0–1	Mar 2025	Copa Colsanitas, Colombia	WTA 250	Clay	(Romania) Irina Bara	(Spain) Cristina Bucșa (Spain) Sara Sorribes Tormo	7–5, 2–6, [5–10]
Loss	0–2	Sep 2025	SP Open, Brazil	WTA 250	Hard	(Brazil) Ingrid Martins	(Hungary) Tímea Babos (Brazil) Luisa Stefani	6–4, 3–6, [4–10]

== WTA 125 finals ==
=== Singles: 1 (title) ===
Result	W–L	Date	Tournament	Surface	Opponent	Score
Win	1–0	Dec 2023	Buenos Aires Open, Argentina	Clay	(Argentina) María Lourdes Carlé	6–3, 6–2

=== Doubles: 11 (4 titles, 7 runner-ups) ===
Result	W–L	Date	Tournament	Surface	Partner	Opponents	Score
Loss	0–1	Mar 2024	San Luis Open, Mexico	Clay	(Poland) Katarzyna Piter	(Hungary) Anna Bondár (Slovenia) Tamara Zidanšek	walkover
Loss	0–2	Nov 2024	Buenos Aires Open, Argentina	Clay	(Egypt) Mayar Sherif	(Poland) Maja Chwalińska (Poland) Katarzyna Kawa	4–6, 6–3, [7–10]
Win	1–2	Dec 2024	Florianópolis Open, Brazil	Clay	(Poland) Maja Chwalińska	(Italy) Nicole Fossa Huergo (Ukraine) Valeriya Strakhova	7–6^{(7–3)}, 6–3
Win	2–2	Nov 2025	Cali Open, Colombia	Clay	(Brazil) Ana Candiotto	(Italy) Nicole Fossa Huergo (Georgia (country)) Ekaterine Gorgodze	6–3, 6–1
Win	3–2	Nov 2025	Buenos Aires Open, Argentina	Clay	(Spain) Alicia Herrero Liñana	(Argentina) Nicole Fossa Huergo (Czech Republic) Laura Samson	6–2, 7–6^{(7–5)}
Win	4–2	May 2026	İstanbul Open, Turkey	Clay	Maria Kozyreva	(Japan) Makoto Ninomiya (Czech Republic) Anastasia Detiuc	6–4, 4–6, 10–7
Loss	4–3	Jul 2026	Contrexéville Open, France	Clay	(Spain) Yvonne Cavallé Reimers	(France) Estelle Cascino (Argentina) Nicole Fossa Huergo	7–6^{(3)}, 2–6, [6–10]
Loss	4–4	Jul 2026	Open Ladies Kitzbühel, Austria	Clay	(Spain) Yvonne Cavallé Reimers	(United Kingdom) Alicia Barnett (France) Elixane Lechemia	4–6, 3–6
Loss	4–5	Oct 2026	Mallorca Championships, Spain	Clay	(Spain) Yvonne Cavallé Reimers	(Croatia) Lucija Ćirić Bagarić (Italy) Angelica Moratelli	6–2, 3–6, [10–12]
Loss	4–6	Oct 2026	Curitiba Open, Brazil	Clay	(Brazil) Nauhany Vitória Leme da Silva	(Slovenia) Dalila Jakupović (Slovenia) Nika Radišić	4–6, 2–6
Loss	4–7	Nov 2026	Cali Open, Colombia	Clay	(Argentina) María Lourdes Carlé	(United States) Anna Rogers (United States) Allura Zamarripa	6–7^{(5–7)}, 5–7

== ITF Circuit finals ==
=== Singles: 23 (12 titles, 11 runner-ups) ===
Legend
W100 tournaments (1–0)
W60/75 tournaments (2–1)
W50 tournaments (1–0)
W25/35 tournaments (3–4)
W10/15 tournaments (5–6)

Result	W–L	Date	Tournament	Tier	Surface	Opponent	Score
Win	1–0	Sep 2012	ITF São José dos Campos, Brazil	W10	Clay	(Brazil) Maria Fernanda Alves	6–2, 0–6, 7–5
Loss	1–1	Jul 2013	ITF São José dos Campos, Brazil	W10	Clay	(Paraguay) Montserrat González	3–6, 2–6
Loss	1–2	Oct 2013	ITF Caracas, Venezuela	W25	Hard	(Paraguay) Verónica Cepede Royg	2–6, 2–6
Win	2–2	Jun 2014	ITF Campos do Jordão, Brazil	W10	Hard	(Argentina) Victoria Bosio	4–6, 6–1, 7–6^{(2)}
Loss	2–3	Oct 2015	ITF São Paulo, Brazil	W10	Clay	(Bolivia) María Álvarez Terán	6–2, 5–7, 4–6
Win	3–3	Nov 2015	ITF Pereira, Colombia	W10	Clay	(Argentina) Victoria Bosio	5–7, 6–0, 6–2
Win	4–3	Mar 2016	ITF São José do Rio Preto, Brazil	W10	Clay	(Chile) Fernanda Brito	6–1, 7–5
Loss	4–4	Apr 2016	ITF São José do Rio Preto, Brazil	W10	Clay	(Argentina) Paula Ormaechea	4–6, 1–6
Loss	4–5	Feb 2017	ITF Hammamet, Tunisia	W15	Clay	(Austria) Julia Grabher	7–6^{(5)}, 2–6, 2–6
Loss	4–6	Mar 2017	ITF São Paulo, Brazil	W25	Clay	(Russia) Irina Khromacheva	2–6, 1–6
Loss	4–7	Feb 2019	ITF Palmanova, Spain	W15	Clay	(Spain) Júlia Payola	2–6, 4–6
Loss	4–8	Feb 2019	ITF Sharm El Sheikh, Egypt	W15	Hard	(Russia) Anna Morgina	3–6, 2–6
Loss	4–9	Oct 2019	Lagos Open, Nigeria	W25	Hard	(Burundi) Sada Nahimana	6–2, 4–6, 3–6
Win	5–9	Feb 2021	ITF Villena, Spain	W15	Hard	(Russia) Ekaterina Yashina	3–6, 6–0, 6–4
Win	6–9	Mar 2021	ITF Pune, India	W25	Hard	(Ukraine) Marianna Zakarlyuk	6–0, 3–6, 7–6^{(5)}
Loss	6–10	Sep 2021	Open Medellín, Colombia	W25	Clay	(Colombia) Emiliana Arango	0–6, 0–6
Win	7–10	Oct 2021	ITF Guayaquil, Ecuador	W25	Clay	(Germany) Katharina Gerlach	6–0, 6–2
Loss	7–11	Nov 2022	Barranquilla Open, Colombia	W60	Hard	(Hungary) Panna Udvardy	2–6, 5–7
Win	8–11	Jul 2023	ITF Feira de Santana, Brazil	W60	Hard	Jana Kolodynska	6–1, 6–3
Win	9–11	Feb 2024	ITF Pretoria, South Africa	W50	Hard	(Belgium) Hanne Vandewinkel	6–2, 4–6, 7–5
Win	10–11	Oct 2024	Internacional de São Paulo, Brazil	W75	Clay	(Italy) Beatrice Ricci	6–7^{(3)}, 6–3, 6–3
Win	11–11	Oct 2025	ITF São Paulo, Brazil	W35	Clay	(Brazil) Carolina Alves	5–7, 7–5, 6–2
Win	12–11	Aug 2026	ITF Maspalomas, Spain	W100	Clay	(Turkey) Berfu Cengiz	6–7^{(2)}, 6–1, 6–3

=== Doubles: 70 (44 titles, 26 runner-ups) ===
Legend
W100 tournaments (1–0)
W80 tournaments (0–2)
W60/75 tournaments (2–4)
W25 tournaments (21–11)
W10/15 tournaments (19–9)

Result	W–L	Date	Tournament	Tier	Surface	Partner	Opponents	Score
Win	1–0	Aug 2011	ITF Mogi das Cruzes, Brazil	W10	Clay	(Brazil) Flávia Dechandt Araújo	(Brazil) Eduarda Piai (Brazil) Karina Venditti	7–6^{(3)}, 4–6, [12–10]
Win	2–0	Sep 2011	ITF São José dos Campos, Brazil	W10	Clay	(Brazil) Flávia Dechandt Araújo	(Argentina) María Irigoyen (Argentina) Carla Lucero	3–6, 7–5, [10–8]
Loss	2–1	Apr 2012	ITF São José dos Campos, Brazil	W10	Clay	(Brazil) Carla Forte	(Bolivia) María Álvarez Terán (Venezuela) Gabriela Paz	0–6, 3–6
Win	3–1	Sep 2012	ITF São José dos Campos, Brazil	W10	Clay	(Brazil) Maria Fernanda Alves	(Brazil) Paula Feitosa (Brazil) Nathália Rossi	6–0, 6–3
Win	4–1	Sep 2012	ITF Bogotá, Colombia	W10	Clay	(Colombia) Yuliana Lizarazo	(United States) Blair Shankle (Colombia) Laura Ucrós	6–2, 6–2
Loss	4–2	Mar 2013	ITF Metepec, Mexico	W10	Hard	(Mexico) Marcela Zacarías	(United States) Macall Harkins (Austria) Nicole Rottmann	3–6, 2–6
Loss	4–3	Apr 2013	ITF La Marsa, Tunisia	W25	Clay	(Montenegro) Danka Kovinić	(Hungary) Réka Luca Jani (Russia) Eugeniya Pashkova	3–6, 6–4, [5–10]
Loss	4–4	Apr 2013	ITF Sharm El Sheikh, Egypt	W10	Hard	(Russia) Olga Doroshina	(Poland) Olga Brózda (Poland) Natalia Kołat	3–6, 1–6
Loss	4–5	Apr 2013	ITF Sharm El Sheikh, Egypt	W10	Hard	(Russia) Olga Doroshina	(Romania) Elena-Teodora Cadar (Spain) Arabela Fernández Rabener	4–6, 3–6
Loss	4–6	Jul 2013	ITF São José dos Campos, Brazil	W10	Clay	(Argentina) Carolina Zeballos	(Argentina) Victoria Bosio (Guatemala) Daniela Schippers	5–7, 4–6
Win	5–6	Jul 2013	ITF São Paulo, Brazil	W10	Clay	(Argentina) Carolina Zeballos	(Brazil) Nathália Rossi (Brazil) Luisa Stefani	6–3, 6–4
Win	6–6	Oct 2013	ITF Asunción, Paraguay	W25	Clay	(Argentina) Florencia Molinero	(Argentina) Vanesa Furlanetto (Argentina) Carolina Zeballos	5–7, 6–4, [10–8]
Loss	6–7	Oct 2013	ITF Caracas, Venezuela	W25	Hard	(Argentina) Florencia Molinero	(Paraguay) Verónica Cepede Royg (Venezuela) Adriana Pérez	3–6, 3–6
Win	7–7	Nov 2013	Internacional de Monterrey, Mexico	W25	Hard	(Argentina) Florencia Molinero	(Netherlands) Indy de Vroome (Slovakia) Lenka Wienerová	7–5, 7–5
Win	8–7	Dec 2013	ITF Mata de São João, Brazil	W25	Clay	(Brazil) Paula Cristina Gonçalves	(Paraguay) Montserrat González (Argentina) Carolina Zeballos	6–2, 6–2
Win	9–7	Dec 2013	ITF Bertioga, Brazil	W25	Hard	(Brazil) Paula Cristina Gonçalves	(Paraguay) Verónica Cepede Royg (Argentina) María Irigoyen	2–6, 6–4, [10–7]
Win	10–7	Jun 2014	ITF Campos do Jordão, Brazil	W10	Hard	(Brazil) Nathália Rossi	(Argentina) Victoria Bosio (Brazil) Ana Clara Duarte	6–4, 6–2
Win	11–7	Sep 2014	ITF Juárez, Mexico	W25	Clay	(Colombia) Mariana Duque Mariño	(Romania) Ioana Loredana Roșca (Slovakia) Lenka Wienerová	6–1, 3–6, [10–4]
Loss	11–8	Jan 2015	ITF Petit-Bourg, France	W10	Hard	(Bolivia) María Álvarez Terán	(Canada) Ayan Broomfield (Canada) Marie-Alexandre Leduc	6–2, 4–6, [8–10]
Loss	11–9	Mar 2015	ITF São José dos Campos, Brazil	W10	Clay	(Brazil) Gabriela Cé	(Brazil) Carolina Alves (Argentina) Victoria Bosio	6–7^{(3)}, 4–6
Win	12–9	Apr 2015	ITF Guadalajara, Mexico	W10	Hard	(Mexico) Marcela Zacarías	(Brazil) Maria Fernanda Alves (Mexico) Renata Zarazúa	6–1, 6–2
Loss	12–10	Aug 2015	ITF San Luis Potosí, Mexico	W10	Hard	(Brazil) Maria Fernanda Alves	(Paraguay) Montserrat González (Mexico) Ana Sofía Sánchez	6–4, 3–6, [8–10]
Win	13–10	Aug 2015	ITF Prague, Czech Republic	W10	Clay	(Slovakia) Zuzana Luknárová	(Slovakia) Jana Jablonovská (Czech Republic) Vendula Žovincová	6–3, 6–7^{(4)}, [10–6]
Win	14–10	Sep 2015	ITF Santa Fe, Argentina	W10	Clay	(Bolivia) María Álvarez Terán	(Argentina) Catalina Pella (Chile) Daniela Seguel	2–6, 6–2, [10–3]
Win	15–10	Oct 2015	ITF São Paulo, Brazil	W10	Clay	(Bolivia) María Álvarez Terán	(Argentina) Melina Ferrero (Argentina) Carla Lucero	6–3, 4–6, [10–5]
Win	16–10	Nov 2015	ITF Caracas, Venezuela	W10	Hard	(Argentina) Catalina Pella	(Romania) Jaqueline Cristian (Venezuela) Aymet Uzcátegui	5–7, 6–1, [10–4]
Win	17–10	Nov 2015	ITF Caracas, Venezuela	W10	Hard	(Argentina) Catalina Pella	(Argentina) Julieta Estable (Argentina) Ana Victoria Gobbi Monllau	1–1 ret.
Win	18–10	Nov 2015	ITF Pereira, Colombia	W10	Clay	(Romania) Jaqueline Cristian	(Colombia) María Herazo González (United States) Danielle Roldan	7–5, 6–3
Loss	18–11	Nov 2015	ITF Santiago, Chile	W25	Clay	(Argentina) Florencia Molinero	(Mexico) Victoria Rodríguez (Mexico) Renata Zarazúa	2–6, 7–5, [7–10]
Loss	18–12	Jan 2016	ITF Guarujá, Brazil	W25	Hard	(Switzerland) Jil Teichmann	(Brazil) Paula Cristina Gonçalves (Brazil) Beatriz Haddad Maia	7–6^{(3)}, 5–7, [7–10]
Win	19–12	Jun 2016	Hódmezővásárhely Ladies Open, Hungary	W25	Clay	(Argentina) Nadia Podoroska	(Romania) Irina Bara (North Macedonia) Lina Gjorcheska	6–3, 6–0
Win	20–12	Jun 2016	ITF Minsk, Belarus	W25	Clay	(Norway) Ulrikke Eikeri	(Belarus) Ilona Kremen (Belarus) Iryna Shymanovich	6–2, 6–4
Loss	20–13	Jun 2016	ITF Minsk, Belarus	W25	Clay	(Norway) Ulrikke Eikeri	(Greece) Valentini Grammatikopoulou (Russia) Anna Kalinskaya	6–4, 1–6, [2–10]
Win	21–13	Jul 2016	ITF Campos do Jordão, Brazil	W25	Hard	(Brazil) Ingrid Martins	(Brazil) Maria Fernanda Alves (Brazil) Luisa Stefani	6–3, 3–6, [10–8]
Win	22–13	Sep 2016	ITF Hua Hin, Thailand	W25	Hard	(Russia) Yana Sizikova	(China) Wei Zhanlan (China) Zhao Qianqian	6–3, 2–6, [10–4]
Win	23–13	Sep 2016	ITF Hua Hin, Thailand	W25	Hard	(Poland) Katarzyna Kawa	(Thailand) Kamonwan Buayam (Chinese Taipei) Lee Pei-chi	7–5, 6–7^{(4)}, [10–6]
Win	24–13	Nov 2016	ITF Castellón, Spain	W10	Clay	(France) Jessika Ponchet	(Spain) Arabela Fernández Rabener (Australia) Isabelle Wallace	6–1, 6–3
Loss	24–14	Dec 2016	ITF Nules, Spain	W10	Clay	(Ukraine) Oleksandra Korashvili	(Ecuador) Charlotte Römer (Spain) Olga Sáez Larra	4–6, 2–6
Win	25–14	Jan 2017	ITF Hammamet, Tunisia	W15	Clay	(Spain) María Teresa Torró Flor	(Romania) Cristina Dinu (Russia) Yana Sizikova	6–2, 6–4
Win	26–14	Jan 2017	ITF Hammamet, Tunisia	W15	Clay	(Greece) Despina Papamichail	(France) Victoria Muntean (China) Sun Xuliu	6–3, 4–6, [10–5]
Loss	26–15	Feb 2017	ITF Curitiba, Brazil	W25	Clay	(Switzerland) Jil Teichmann	(Brazil) Gabriela Cé (Venezuela) Andrea Gámiz	6–4, 2–6, [2–10]
Loss	26–16	Apr 2017	ITF Indian Harbour Beach, United States	W80	Clay	(Mexico) Renata Zarazúa	(United States) Kristie Ahn (United States) Quinn Gleason	3–6, 2–6
Loss	26–17	Jun 2017	Open de Montpellier, France	W25	Clay	(Mexico) Victoria Rodríguez	(Japan) Momoko Kobori (Japan) Ayano Shimizu	3–6, 6–4, [7–10]
Win	27–17	Mar 2018	ITF Hammamet, Tunisia	W15	Clay	(Romania) Oana Gavrilă	(Austria) Melanie Klaffner (Romania) Oana Georgeta Simion	7–5, 6–7^{(6)}, [11–9]
Win	28–17	Mar 2018	ITF Hammamet, Tunisia	W15	Clay	(Paraguay) Montserrat González	(Italy) Camilla Scala (Bulgaria) Isabella Shinikova	6–2, 6–0
Win	29–17	May 2018	ITF Tbilisi, Georgia	W25	Hard	(Slovakia) Tereza Mihalíková	(Belarus) Sviatlana Pirazhenka (Netherlands) Erika Vogelsang	6–4, 6–1
Win	30–17	May 2018	ITF Les Franqueses del Vallès, Spain	W25	Hard	(Mexico) Giuliana Olmos	(Romania) Raluca Șerban (India) Pranjala Yadlapalli	6–4, 6–4
Win	31–17	Jul 2018	Internazionale di Roma, Italy	W60	Clay	(Mexico) Renata Zarazúa	(Italy) Anastasia Grymalska (Italy) Giorgia Marchetti	6–1, 4–6, [13–11]
Win	32–17	Jul 2018	ITF Porto, Portugal	W25	Hard	(Paraguay) Montserrat González	(Spain) Cristina Bucșa (Japan) Ramu Ueda	7–5, 6–0
Loss	32–18	Sep 2018	Montreux Ladies Open, Switzerland	W60	Clay	(Belgium) Maryna Zanevska	(Romania) Andreea Mitu (Romania) Elena-Gabriela Ruse	6–4, 3–6, [4–10]
Win	33–18	Feb 2019	ITF Sharm El Sheikh, Egypt	W15	Hard	(Russia) Anna Morgina	(Belarus) Nika Shytkouskaya (Russia) Anastasia Sukhotina	6–2, 6–2
Win	34–18	Mar 2019	ITF Campinas, Brazil	W25	Clay	(Montenegro) Danka Kovinić	(Brazil) Carolina Alves (Brazil) Gabriela Cé	6–3, 6–2
Loss	34–19	Jun 2019	ITF Figueira da Foz, Portugal	W25	Hard	(Japan) Moyuka Uchijima	(Portugal) Francisca Jorge (Spain) Olga Parres Azcoitia	4–6, 6–4, [9–11]
Win	35–19	Oct 2019	Lagos Open, Nigeria	W25	Hard	(India) Rutuja Bhosale	(Egypt) Sandra Samir (India) Prarthana Thombare	4–6, 6–4, [10–7]
Win	36–19	Oct 2019	Lagos Open, Nigeria	W25	Hard	(India) Rutuja Bhosale	(Egypt) Sandra Samir (India) Prarthana Thombare	6–3, 6–7^{(3)}, [10–6]
Win	37–19	Jan 2020	ITF Malibu, United States	W25	Hard	(Netherlands) Rosalie van der Hoek	(Norway) Astrid Wanja Brune Olsen (Peru) Anastasia Iamachkine	6–4, 7–6^{(4)}
Win	38–19	Jan 2020	ITF Petit-Bourg, Guadeloupe	W25	Hard	(Netherlands) Rosalie van der Hoek	(France) Mylène Halemai (France) Manon Léonard	6–2, 6–1
Loss	38–20	Jul 2021	President's Cup, Kazakhstan	W60	Hard	(Russia) Evgeniya Levashova	(Russia) Alina Charaeva (Russia) Maria Timofeeva	6–7^{(5)}, 6–2, [6–10]
Loss	38–21	Aug 2021	ITF Vigo, Spain	W25	Hard	(Switzerland) Conny Perrin	(United Kingdom) Alicia Barnett (Australia) Olivia Gadecki	3–6, 2–6
Win	39–21	Sep 2021	Open Medellín, Colombia	W25	Clay	(Colombia) María Herazo González	(United States) Rasheeda McAdoo (Mexico) Victoria Rodríguez	6–2, 7–5
Loss	39–22	Sep 2021	Open de Valencia, Spain	W80	Clay	(Georgia (country)) Ekaterine Gorgodze	(Spain) Aliona Bolsova (Venezuela) Andrea Gamiz	3–6, 4–6
Win	40–22	Oct 2021	ITF Lima, Peru	W25	Clay	(Argentina) María Lourdes Carlé	(Colombia) María Paulina Pérez (Colombia) Jessica Plazas	6–1, 6–1
Win	41–22	Nov 2021	ITF Aparecida de Goiania, Brazil	W25	Clay	(Czech Republic) Anna Sisková	(Netherlands) Merel Hoedt (Germany) Luisa Meyer auf der Heide	6–2, 7–6^{(5)}
Loss	41–23	Mar 2022	ITF Anapoima, Colombia	W25	Clay	(Argentina) María Lourdes Carlé	(Switzerland) Ylena In-Albon (Hungary) Réka Luca Jani	6–1, 3–6, [7–10]
Loss	41–24	Mar 2022	Medellín Open, Colombia	W25	Clay	(Argentina) María Lourdes Carlé	(Switzerland) Conny Perrin (Chile) Daniela Seguel	2–6, 7–5, [8–10]
Win	42–24	May 2024	Wiesbaden Open, Germany	W100	Clay	(United Kingdom) Samantha Murray Sharan	(Japan) Himeno Sakatsume (Bosnia and Herzegovina) Anita Wagner	7–5, 6–2
Win	43–24	May 2024	Zagreb Ladies Open, Croatia	W75	Clay	(Switzerland) Céline Naef	(United Kingdom) Emily Appleton (India) Prarthana Thombare	4–6, 6–1, [10–8]
Loss	43–25	Jun 2025	Internationaux de Blois, France	W75	Clay	(Spain) Ángela Fita Boluda	(Chinese Taipei) Cho I-hsuan (Chinese Taipei) Cho Yi-tsen	5–7, 6–4, [5–10]
Loss	43–26	Jun 2026	Internazionali di Caserta, Italy	W75	Clay	(Spain) Yvonne Cavallé Reimers	(United Kingdom) Freya Christie (United Kingdom) Eden Silva	6–3, 4–6, [4–10]
Win	44–26	Jul 2026	Vacaria Open, Brazil	W75	Clay (i)	(Brazil) Naná Silva	(Brazil) Carolina Martins (United States) Isabella Barrera	4–6, 6–2, [10–6]

== Billie Jean King Cup participation ==
=== Singles (3–4) ===
Edition	Stage	Date	Location	Against	Surface	Opponents	W/L	Score
2020–21	F P/O	Apr 2021	Bytom (POL)	Poland	Hard	(Poland) Urszula Radwańska	W	7–6^{(9)}, 3–6, 6–2
2020–21	F P/O	Apr 2021	Bytom (POL)	Poland	Hard	(Poland) Magdalena Fręch	L	4–6, 3–6
2022	Z1 R/R	Apr 2022	Salinas (ECU)	Argentina	Hard	(Argentina) Solana Sierra	L	6–7, 6–4, 6–7
2022	Z1 R/R	Apr 2022	Salinas (ECU)	Colombia	Hard	(Colombia) María Herazo González	W	6–0, 6–4
2022	Z1 P/O	Apr 2022	Salinas (ECU)	Chile	Hard	(Chile) Bárbara Gatica	W	6–4, 6–2
2023	Finals Q	Apr 2023	Stuttgart (GER)	Germany	Hard	(Germany) Tatjana Maria	L	3–6, 6–3, 5–7
2023	Finals Q	Apr 2023	Stuttgart (GER)	Germany	Hard	(Germany) Anna-Lena Friedsam	L	1–6, 0–6

=== Doubles (4–3) ===
Edition	Stage	Date	Location	Against	Surface	Partner	Opponents	W/L	Score
2013	Z1 R/R	Feb 2013	Medellín (COL)	Mexico	Clay	Teliana Pereira	Ana Paula de la Peña; Marcela Zacarías	W	6–0, 6–3
2013	Z1 P/O	Feb 2013	Medellín (COL)	Canada	Clay	Teliana Pereira	Gabriela Dabrowski; Sharon Fichman	L	6–7^{(4)}, 5–7
2014	Z1 R/R	Feb 2014	Lambaré (PAR)	Ecuador	Clay	Gabriela Cé	Doménica González; Charlotte Römer	W	6–4, 6–4
2014	Z1 R/R	Feb 2014	Lambaré (PAR)	(The Bahamas) Bahamas	Clay	Gabriela Cé	Nikkita Fountain; Larikah Russell	W	6–2, 6–2
2014	WG2 P/O	Apr 2014	Catanduva (BRA)	Switzerland	Clay	Gabriela Cé	Belinda Bencic; Viktorija Golubic	L	2–6, 2–6
2020–21	F QR	Feb 2020	Florianópolis (BRA)	Germany	Clay	Luisa Stefani	Anna-Lena Friedsam; Antonia Lottner	L	1–6, 4–6
2022	Z1 R/R	Apr 2022	Salinas (ECU)	Guatemala	Hard	Beatriz Haddad Maia	Gabriela Rivera; Kirsten-Andrea Weedon	W	6–3, 6–1

== Awards ==
2021

- Prêmio Brasil Olímpico - Best Brazilian tennis player of the year (tied with Luisa Stefani)
