= 2013 Fed Cup Americas Zone Group I – Pool B =

International tennis competition

Group B of the 2013 Fed Cup Americas Zone Group I was one of four pools in the Americas zone of the 2013 Fed Cup. Four teams competed in a round robin competition, with the top team and the bottom two teams proceeding to their respective sections of the play-offs: the top teams played for advancement to the World Group II Play-offs, while the bottom teams faced potential relegation to Group II.

== Standings ==
		(Paraguay) PAR	(Brazil) BRA	(Chile) CHI	(Mexico) MEX	RR; W–L	Set; W–L	Game; W–L	Standings
20	Paraguay		2–0	3–0	2–1	2–1	12–8	98–77	2
31	Brazil	0–2		3–0	3–0	3–0	16–2	104–50	1
38	Chile	0–3	0–3		0–2	0–3	4–16	53–113	4
46	Mexico	1–2	0–3	2–0		1–2	6–12	73–88	3

== Round-robin ==
=== Paraguay vs. Mexico ===
Paraguay
2
Country Club de Ejecutivos, Medellín, Colombia
February 6, 2013
Red clay (outdoors)

Mexico
1

			1	2	3
1	(Paraguay) (Mexico)	Camila Giangreco Campiz; Marcela Zacarías	3; 6	6; 3	3; 6
2	(Paraguay) (Mexico)	Verónica Cepede Royg; Ana Sofía Sánchez	7; 5	7; 5
3	(Paraguay) (Mexico)	Verónica Cepede Royg / Montserrat González; Ana Paula de la Peña / Ximena Hermoso	6; 3	6; 3

=== Brazil vs. Chile ===
Brazil
3
Country Club de Ejecutivos, Medellín, Colombia
February 6, 2013
Red clay (outdoors)

Chile
0

			1	2	3
1	(Brazil) (Chile)	Paula Cristina Gonçalves; Cecilia Costa Melgar	4; 6	6; 3	6; 1
2	(Brazil) (Chile)	Teliana Pereira; Fernanda Brito	7; 5	6; 1
3	(Brazil) (Chile)	Paula Cristina Gonçalves / Teliana Pereira; Fernanda Brito / Cecilia Costa Melgar	6; 2	6; 2

=== Paraguay vs. Chile ===
Paraguay
3
Country Club de Ejecutivos, Medellín, Colombia
February 7, 2013
Red clay (outdoors)

Chile
0

			1	2	3
1	(Paraguay) (Chile)	Montserrat González; Cecilia Costa Melgar	4; 6	6; 1	6; 3
2	(Paraguay) (Chile)	Verónica Cepede Royg; Fernanda Brito	6; 0	4; 6	6; 2
3	(Paraguay) (Chile)	Verónica Cepede Royg / Montserrat González; Fernanda Brito / Cecilia Costa Melgar	6; 0	6; 1

=== Brazil vs. Mexico ===
Brazil
3
Country Club de Ejecutivos, Medellín, Colombia
February 7, 2013
Red clay (outdoors)

Mexico
0

			1	2	3
1	(Brazil) (Mexico)	Paula Cristina Gonçalves; Ana Sofía Sánchez	6; 4	6; 2
2	(Brazil) (Mexico)	Teliana Pereira; Ximena Hermoso	6; 2	6; 3
3	(Brazil) (Mexico)	Teliana Pereira / Laura Pigossi; Ana Paula de la Peña / Marcela Zacarías	6; 0	6; 3

=== Paraguay vs. Brazil ===
Paraguay
0
Country Club de Ejecutivos, Medellín, Colombia
February 8, 2013
Red clay (outdoors)

Brazil
2

			1	2	3
1	(Paraguay) (Brazil)	Montserrat González; Paula Cristina Gonçalves	2; 6	6; 3	3; 6
2	(Paraguay) (Brazil)	Verónica Cepede Royg; Teliana Pereira	1; 6	4; 6
3	(Paraguay) (Brazil)	Verónica Cepede Royg / Montserrat González; Teliana Pereira / Laura Pigossi				not played

=== Chile vs. Mexico ===
Chile
0
Country Club de Ejecutivos, Medellín, Colombia
February 8, 2013
Red clay (outdoors)

Mexico
2

			1	2	3
1	(Chile) (Mexico)	Fernanda Brito; Marcela Zacarías	6; 4	0; 6	4; 6
2	(Chile) (Mexico)	Andrea Koch Benvenuto; Ana Sofía Sánchez	2; 6	2; 6
3	(Chile) (Mexico)	Cecilia Costa Melgar / Andrea Koch Benvenuto; Ana Paula de la Peña / Ximena Hermoso				not played
