= 2012 Monterrey Open – Doubles =

Doubles
- 2012 Monterrey Open

Final
- Champions: (Italy) Sara Errani (Italy) Roberta Vinci
- Runners-up: (Japan) Kimiko Date-Krumm (China) Zhang Shuai
- Score: 6–2, 7–6^{(8–6)}

Details
- Draw: 16
- Seeds: 4

Events
Singles	Doubles
← 2011 ·	Monterrey Open	· 2013 →

Iveta Benešová and Barbora Záhlavová-Strýcová were the defending champions but chose to participate at the 2012 Dubai Tennis Championships instead.

Sara Errani and Roberta Vinci won the title over Kimiko Date-Krumm and Zhang Shuai.

== Seeds ==
1. (Italy) Sara Errani / (Italy) Roberta Vinci (champions)
2. (Japan) Kimiko Date-Krumm / (China) Zhang Shuai (final)
3. (Russia) Nina Bratchikova / (Croatia) Darija Jurak (semifinals)
4. (Czech Republic) Eva Birnerová / (Russia) Alexandra Panova (first round)

== Draw ==
=== Key ===
- Q = Qualifier
- WC = Wild card
- LL = Lucky loser
- Alt = Alternate
- SE = Special exempt
- PR = Protected ranking
- ITF = ITF entry
- JE = Junior exempt
- w/o = Walkover
- r = Retired
- d = Defaulted
- SR = Special ranking

=== Draw ===
First round
1	(Italy) S Errani (Italy) R Vinci	6	6
(France) A Cornet (Romania) A Dulgheru	1	1
(Slovakia) J Husárová (Hungary) K Marosi	7^{7}	6^{5}	[10]
(Luxembourg) M Minella (Switzerland) S Vögele	6^{3}	7^{7}	[8]
4	(Czech Republic) E Birnerová (Russia) A Panova	5	3
WC	(Argentina) G Dulko (Argentina) P Suárez	7	6
(Croatia) M Abramović (Romania) M Buzărnescu	3	6	[10]
(Ukraine) M Koryttseva (Germany) T Malek	6	1	[8]
WC	(Mexico) AP de la Peña (Mexico) I López	2	2
(Canada) S Fichman (China) S Sun	6	6
(Hungary) T Babos (Russia) V Savinykh	4	2
3	(Russia) N Bratchikova (Croatia) D Jurak	6	6
(Spain) L Costas-Moreira (Spain) I Ferrer Suárez	6	3	[10]
(Spain) E Cabeza Candela (Romania) A Cadanțu	4	6	[7]
(United States) T Luzhanska (Slovakia) L Wienerová	6	3	[5]
2	(Japan) K Date-Krumm (China) S Zhang	3	6	[10]

Quarterfinals
1	(Italy) S Errani (Italy) R Vinci	6	6
(Slovakia) J Husárová (Hungary) K Marosi	1	1
WC	(Argentina) G Dulko (Argentina) P Suárez	6	6
(Croatia) M Abramović (Romania) M Buzărnescu	3	3
(Canada) S Fichman (China) S Sun	2	3
3	(Russia) N Bratchikova (Croatia) D Jurak	6	6
(Spain) L Costas-Moreira (Spain) I Ferrer Suárez	3	6	[7]
2	(Japan) K Date-Krumm (China) S Zhang	6	3	[10]

Semifinals
1	(Italy) S Errani (Italy) R Vinci	6	6
WC	(Argentina) G Dulko (Argentina) P Suárez	3	3
3	(Russia) N Bratchikova (Croatia) D Jurak	2	6	[7]
2	(Japan) K Date-Krumm (China) S Zhang	6	2	[10]

Final
1	(Italy) S Errani (Italy) R Vinci	6	7^{8}
2	(Japan) K Date-Krumm (China) S Zhang	2	6^{6}
