= 2012 Monterrey Open =

- Date: 20–26 February
- Edition: 4th
- Category: WTA International
- Draw: 32S / 16D
- Prize money: $220,000
- Surface: Hard / outdoor
- Location: Monterrey, Mexico
- Venue: Sierra Madre Tennis Club

Champions

Singles
- (Hungary) Tímea Babos

Doubles
- (Italy) Sara Errani (Italy) Roberta Vinci
- Monterrey Open

The 2012 Monterrey Open was a women's tennis tournament played on outdoor hard courts. It was the fourth edition of the Monterrey Open and was an International tournament on the 2012 WTA Tour. It took place at the Sierra Madre Tennis Club in Monterrey, Mexico, from 20 February through 26 February 2012. Unseeded Tímea Babos won the singles title.

== Finals ==
=== Singles ===
(Hungary) Tímea Babos defeated (Romania) Alexandra Cadanțu, 6–4, 6–4

- It was Babos' 1st singles title of her career.

=== Doubles ===
(Italy) Sara Errani / (Italy) Roberta Vinci defeated (Japan) Kimiko Date-Krumm / (China) Zhang Shuai, 6–2, 7–6^{(8–6)}

== Singles main-draw entrants ==
=== Seeds ===
Country	Player	Rank*	Seed
ITA	Roberta Vinci	24	1
ITA	Sara Errani	35	2
ROU	Sorana Cîrstea	49	3
ROU	Alexandra Dulgheru	53	4
ARG	Gisela Dulko	68	5
HUN	Gréta Arn	70	6
FRA	Mathilde Johansson	71	7
ESP	Lourdes Domínguez Lino	72	8

- Rankings as of 13 February 2012

=== Other entrants ===
The following players received wildcards into the main draw:

- (Romania) Sorana Cîrstea
- (Mexico) Ximena Hermoso
- (Kazakhstan) Yaroslava Shvedova

The following players received entry via qualifying:

- (Croatia) Maria Abramović
- (Kazakhstan) Sesil Karatantcheva
- (Hungary) Katalin Marosi
- (Puerto Rico) Monica Puig

=== Withdrawals ===
- (Switzerland) Romina Oprandi
- (United States) Serena Williams (left ankle injury)

== Doubles main-draw entrants ==
=== Seeds ===
Country	Player	Country	Player	Rank^{1}	Seed
ITA	Sara Errani	ITA	Roberta Vinci	31	1
JPN	Kimiko Date-Krumm	CHN	Zhang Shuai	116	2
RUS	Nina Bratchikova	CRO	Darija Jurak	149	3
CZE	Eva Birnerová	RUS	Alexandra Panova	159	4

- ^{1} Rankings are as of 13 February 2012

=== Other entrants ===
The following pairs received wildcards into the doubles main draw:

- (Mexico) Ana Paula de la Peña / (Mexico) Ivette López
- (Argentina) Gisela Dulko / (Argentina) Paola Suárez
