= 2013 Fed Cup Americas Zone Group I – Pool A =

Pool in Americas zone of the 2013 Fed Cup

Group A of the 2013 Fed Cup Americas Zone Group I was one of four pools in the Americas zone of the 2013 Fed Cup. Four teams competed in a round robin competition, with the top team and the bottom two teams proceeding to their respective sections of the play-offs: the top teams played for advancement to the World Group II Play-offs, while the bottom teams faced potential relegation to Group II.

== Standings ==
		(Colombia) COL	(Canada) CAN	(Peru) PER	(Venezuela) VEN	RR; W–L	Set; W–L	Game; W–L	Standings
19	Colombia		0–2	3–0	3–0	2–1	18–6	95–66	2
21	Canada	2–0		3–0	3–0	3–0	16–0	99–43	1
35	Peru	0–3	0–3		1–2	0–3	6–17	74–124	4
43	Venezuela	0–3	0–3	2–1		1–2	5–16	78–112	3

== Round-robin ==
=== Colombia vs. Venezuela ===
Colombia
3
Country Club de Ejecutivos, Medellín, Colombia
February 6, 2013
Red clay (outdoors)

Venezuela
0

			1	2	3
1	(Colombia) (Venezuela)	Catalina Castaño; Andrea Gámiz	7; 5	6; 1
2	(Colombia) (Venezuela)	Mariana Duque; Adriana Pérez	6; 1	7; 5
3	(Colombia) (Venezuela)	Catalina Castaño / Mariana Duque; Andrea Gámiz / Adriana Pérez	6; 2	6; 4

=== Canada vs. Peru ===
Canada
3
Country Club de Ejecutivos, Medellín, Colombia
February 6, 2013
Red clay (outdoors)

Peru
0

			1	2	3
1	(Canada) (Peru)	Sharon Fichman; Katherine Miranda Chang	6; 2	6; 2
2	(Canada) (Peru)	Eugenie Bouchard; Patricia Kú Flores	6; 4	6; 3
3	(Canada) (Peru)	Gabriela Dabrowski / Sharon Fichman; Ferny Ángeles Paz / Ximena Siles Luna	6; 2	6; 1

=== Colombia vs. Peru ===
Colombia
3
Country Club de Ejecutivos, Medellín, Colombia
February 7, 2013
Red clay (outdoors)

Peru
0

			1	2	3
1	(Colombia) (Peru)	Catalina Castaño; Katherine Miranda Chang	6; 2	6; 0
2	(Colombia) (Peru)	Mariana Duque; Patricia Kú Flores	6; 4	6^{10} 7^{12}	6; 2
3	(Colombia) (Peru)	Yuliana Lizarazo / Laura Ucrós; Ferny Ángeles Paz / Katherine Miranda Chang	6; 2	4; 6	6; 1

=== Canada vs. Venezuela ===
Canada
3
Country Club de Ejecutivos, Medellín, Colombia
February 7, 2013
Red clay (outdoors)

Venezuela
0

			1	2	3
1	(Canada) (Venezuela)	Sharon Fichman; Andrea Gámiz	7; 5	6; 1
2	(Canada) (Venezuela)	Eugenie Bouchard; Adriana Pérez	6; 1	7; 5
3	(Canada) (Venezuela)	Gabriela Dabrowski / Stéphanie Dubois; Carmen Blanco / Gabriella de Santis	6; 2	6; 4

=== Colombia vs. Canada ===
Colombia
0
Country Club de Ejecutivos, Medellín, Colombia
February 8, 2013
Red clay (outdoors)

Canada
2

			1	2	3
1	(Colombia) (Canada)	Catalina Castaño; Sharon Fichman	1; 6	5; 7
2	(Colombia) (Canada)	Mariana Duque; Eugenie Bouchard	2; 6	3; 6
3	(Colombia) (Canada)	Catalina Castaño / Mariana Duque; Gabriela Dabrowski / Sharon Fichman				not played

=== Peru vs. Venezuela ===
Peru
1
Country Club de Ejecutivos, Medellín, Colombia
February 8, 2013
Red clay (outdoors)

Venezuela
2

			1	2	3
1	(Peru) (Venezuela)	Katherine Miranda Chang; Andrea Gámiz	6; 2	0; 6	4; 6
2	(Peru) (Venezuela)	Patricia Kú Flores; Adriana Pérez	7; 5	4; 6	6; 2
3	(Peru) (Venezuela)	Patricia Kú Flores / Katherine Miranda Chang; Andrea Gámiz / Adriana Pérez	3; 6	6; 3	0; 6

== See also ==
- Fed Cup structure
