= 2012 Fed Cup Americas Zone Group II – Pool B =

Group B of the 2012 Fed Cup Americas Zone Group II was one of two pools in the Americas zone of the 2012 Fed Cup. Five teams competed in a round robin competition, with the teams proceeding to their respective sections of the play-offs: the top two teams played for advancement to the 2013 Group I.

		(Chile) CHI	(Mexico) MEX	(Puerto Rico) PUR	(Uruguay) URU	(Costa Rica) CRC	RR; W–L	Set; W–L	Game; W–L	Standings
49	Chile		3–0	2–1	3–0	3–0	4–0	23–4	153–70	1
57	Mexico	0–3		2–1	3–0	3–0	3–1	17–9	127–87	2
64	Puerto Rico	1–2	1–2		2–1	3–0	2–2	15–12	130–126	3
65	Uruguay	0–3	0–3	1–2		2–1	1–3	7–18	81–130	4
74	Costa Rica	0–3	0–3	0–3	1–2		0–4	3–22	68–146	5

== Mexico vs. Costa Rica ==
Mexico
3
Club San Javier, Guadalajara, Mexico
16 April 2012
Red clay (outdoors)

Costa Rica
0

			1	2	3
1	(Mexico) (Costa Rica)	Marcela Zacarías; Mariela Haug	6; 2	6; 1
2	(Mexico) (Costa Rica)	Ana Sofía Sánchez; Ximena Mino	6; 2	7; 5
3	(Mexico) (Costa Rica)	Carolina Betancourt / Ana Paula de la Peña; Mariela Haug / Juli Raventós	6; 3	6; 4

== Puerto Rico vs. Uruguay ==
Puerto Rico
2
Club San Javier, Guadalajara, Mexico
16 April 2012
Red clay (outdoors)

Uruguay
1

			1	2	3
1	(Puerto Rico) (Uruguay)	Yolimar Ogando; Ana Lucía Migliarini de León	1; 6	3; 6
2	(Puerto Rico) (Uruguay)	Monica Puig; Sara Quiroga	7^{7} 6^{5}	6; 3
3	(Puerto Rico) (Uruguay)	Yolimar Ogando / Monica Puig; Ana Lucía Migliarini de León / Virginia Sadi	7^{7} 6^{5}	6; 3

== Chile vs. Mexico ==
Chile
3
Club San Javier, Guadalajara, Mexico
17 April 2012
Red clay (outdoors)

Mexico
0

			1	2	3
1	(Chile) (Mexico)	Cecilia Costa Melgar; Carolina Betancourt	6; 0	6; 1
2	(Chile) (Mexico)	Andrea Koch-Benvenuto; Ana Sofía Sánchez	6; 3	6; 1
3	(Chile) (Mexico)	Cecilia Costa Melgar / Camila Silva; Ana Paula de la Peña / Marcela Zacarías	1; 6	6; 4	6; 3

== Puerto Rico vs. Costa Rica ==
Puerto Rico
3
Club San Javier, Guadalajara, Mexico
17 April 2012
Red clay (outdoors)

Costa Rica
0

			1	2	3
1	(Puerto Rico) (Costa Rica)	Ana Sofía Cordero; Mariela Haug	3; 6	7^{7} 6^{4}	6; 4
2	(Puerto Rico) (Costa Rica)	Monica Puig; Ximena Mino	6; 1	6; 0
3	(Puerto Rico) (Costa Rica)	Yolimar Ogando / Monica Puig; Mariela Haug / Juli Raventós	6; 3	6; 1

== Chile vs. Puerto Rico ==
Chile
2
Club San Javier, Guadalajara, Mexico
18 April 2012
Red clay (outdoors)

Puerto Rico
1

			1	2	3
1	(Chile) (Puerto Rico)	Cecilia Costa Melgar; Yolimar Ogando	6; 2	6; 2
2	(Chile) (Puerto Rico)	Andrea Koch-Benvenuto; Monica Puig	7^{7} 6^{0}	6^{1} 7^{7}	1; 6
3	(Chile) (Puerto Rico)	Cecilia Costa Melgar / Camila Silva; Yolimar Ogando / Monica Puig	7^{7} 6^{0}	6; 2

== Uruguay vs. Costa Rica ==
Uruguay
2
Club San Javier, Guadalajara, Mexico
18 April 2012
Red clay (outdoors)

Costa Rica
1

			1	2	3
1	(Uruguay) (Costa Rica)	Ana Lucía Migliarini de León; Juli Raventós	6; 3	6; 1
2	(Uruguay) (Costa Rica)	Sara Quiroga; Ximena Mino	6; 3	6; 3
3	(Uruguay) (Costa Rica)	María José Pintos / Virginia Sadi; Mariela Haug / Juli Raventós	4; 6	5; 7

== Chile vs. Uruguay ==
Chile
3
Club San Javier, Guadalajara, Mexico
19 April 2012
Red clay (outdoors)

Uruguay
0

			1	2	3
1	(Chile) (Uruguay)	Cecilia Costa Melgar; Ana Lucía Migliarini de León	5; 7	6; 3	6; 2
2	(Chile) (Uruguay)	Andrea Koch-Benvenuto; María José Pintos	6; 1	6; 0
3	(Chile) (Uruguay)	Cecilia Costa Melgar / Camila Silva; María José Pintos / Virginia Sadi	6; 1	6; 0

== Mexico vs. Puerto Rico ==
Mexico
2
Club San Javier, Guadalajara, Mexico
19 April 2012
Red clay (outdoors)

Puerto Rico
1

			1	2	3
1	(Mexico) (Puerto Rico)	Marcela Zacarías; Yolimar Ogando	6; 2	6; 1
2	(Mexico) (Puerto Rico)	Ana Sofía Sánchez; Monica Puig	3; 6	5; 7
3	(Mexico) (Puerto Rico)	Ana Paula de la Peña / Marcela Zacarías; Yolimar Ogando / Monica Puig	6; 2	3; 6	7; 5

== Chile vs. Costa Rica ==
Chile
3
Club San Javier, Guadalajara, Mexico
20 April 2012
Red clay (outdoors)

Costa Rica
0

			1	2	3
1	(Chile) (Costa Rica)	Cecilia Costa Melgar; Mariela Haug	6; 0	6; 0
2	(Chile) (Costa Rica)	Andrea Koch-Benvenuto; Ximena Mino	6; 0	6; 4
3	(Chile) (Costa Rica)	Cecilia Costa Melgar / Camila Silva; Mariela Haug / Juli Raventós	6; 1	6; 2

== Mexico vs. Uruguay ==
Mexico
3
Club San Javier, Guadalajara, Mexico
20 April 2012
Red clay (outdoors)

Uruguay
0

			1	2	3
1	(Mexico) (Uruguay)	Marcela Zacarías; Sara Quiroga	6; 1	6; 0
2	(Mexico) (Uruguay)	Ana Sofía Sánchez; María José Pintos	6; 0	6; 1
3	(Mexico) (Uruguay)	Carolina Betancourt / Ana Paula de la Peña; María José Pintos / Sara Quiroga	6; 0	6; 2

== See also ==
- Fed Cup structure
