= Katherine Miranda Chang =

Peruvian tennis player (born 1994)

- Full name: Katherine Gabriela Miranda Chang
- Country (sports): Peru
- Born: 11 February 1994 (age 31); Lima, Peru
- Prize money: $8,056

Singles
- Career record: 27–29
- Highest ranking: No. 740 (13 August 2012)

Doubles
- Career record: 35–22
- Career titles: 3 ITF
- Highest ranking: No. 539 (22 October 2012)

Team competitions
- Fed Cup: 1–7

Katherine Gabriela Miranda Chang (born 11 February 1994) is a Peruvian former tennis player.

She won three doubles titles on the ITF Women's Circuit in her career. On 13 August 2012, she reached her best singles ranking of world No. 740. On 22 October 2012, she peaked at No. 539 in the doubles rankings.

Playing for Peru in the Fed Cup, Miranda Chang has a win–loss record of 1–7.

== ITF finals ==
=== Doubles (3–4) ===
Legend $25,000 tournaments $10/15,000 tournaments	Finals by surface Hard (0–0) Clay (3–4)

Outcome	No.	Date	Location	Surface	Partner	Opponents	Score
Winner	1.	29 October 2011	Bogotá, Colombia	Clay	(Peru) Patricia Kú Flores	(Chile) Cecilia Costa Melgar (Chile) Belén Ludueña	6–4, 7–5
Winner	2.	12 November 2011	Medellín, Colombia	Clay	(Peru) Patricia Kú Flores	(Slovakia) Martina Frantová (United States) Libby Muma	6–4, 7–6^{(7–4)}
Runner-up	1.	21 April 2012	Arequipa, Peru	Clay	(Peru) Patricia Kú Flores	(United States) Erin Clark (Peru) Ingrid Várgas Calvo	6–7^{(2–7)}, 5–7
Winner	3.	21 July 2012	Cochabamba, Bolivia	Clay	(Paraguay) Jazmín Britos	(Mexico) Victoria Lozano (Chile) Camila Silva	3–6, 7–5, [10–5]
Runner-up	2.	18 August 2012	Trujillo, Peru	Clay	(Peru) Patricia Kú Flores	(Argentina) Aranza Salut (Mexico) Ana Sofía Sánchez	6–3, 1–6, [9–11]
Runner-up	3.	25 January 2013	Lima, Peru	Clay	(Peru) Patricia Kú Flores	(Brazil) Maria Fernanda Alves (Argentina) Vanesa Furlanetto	1–6, 4–6
Runner-up	4.	8 November 2013	Lima, Peru	Clay	(Argentina) Daniela Farfán	(Argentina) Aldana Ciccarelli (Dominican Republic) Francesca Segarelli	2–6, 6–4, [5–10]

== Fed Cup participation ==
=== Singles (0–3) ===
Edition	Stage	Date	Location	Against	Surface	Opponent	W/L	Score
2013 Fed Cup; Americas Zone Group I	R/R	6 February 2013	Medellín, Colombia	Canada	Clay	(Canada) Sharon Fichman	L	2–6, 2–6
2013 Fed Cup; Americas Zone Group I	R/R	7 February 2013	Medellín, Colombia	Colombia	Clay	(Colombia) Catalina Castaño	L	2–6, 0–6
2013 Fed Cup; Americas Zone Group I	R/R	8 February 2013	Medellín, Colombia	Venezuela	Clay	(Venezuela) Andrea Gámiz	L	6–2, 0–6, 4–6

=== Doubles (1–4) ===
Edition	Stage	Date	Location	Against	Surface	Partner	Opponents	W/L	Score
2012 Fed Cup; Americas Zone Group I	R/R	1 February 2012	Curitiba, Brazil	Canada	Clay	(Peru) Patricia Kú Flores	(Canada) Marie-Ève Pelletier (Canada) Aleksandra Wozniak	L	1–6, 0–6
2012 Fed Cup; Americas Zone Group I	R/R	2 February 2012	Curitiba, Brazil	(The Bahamas) Bahamas	Clay	(Peru) Ferny Ángeles Paz	(The Bahamas) Nikkita Fountain (The Bahamas) Larikah Russell	W	6–1, 6–4
2012 Fed Cup; Americas Zone Group I	R/R	3 February 2012	Curitiba, Brazil	Argentina	Clay	(Peru) Ferny Ángeles Paz	(Argentina) Mailen Auroux (Argentina) María Irigoyen	L	0–6, 0–6
2013 Fed Cup; Americas Zone Group I	R/R	7 February 2013	Medellín, Colombia	Colombia	Clay	(Peru) Ferny Ángeles Paz	(Colombia) Yuliana Lizarazo (Colombia) Laura Ucrós	L	2–6, 6–4, 1–6
2013 Fed Cup; Americas Zone Group I	R/R	8 February 2013	Medellín, Colombia	Venezuela	Clay	(Peru) Patricia Kú Flores	(Venezuela) Andrea Gámiz (Venezuela) Adriana Pérez	L	3–6, 6–3, 0–6
