= Marcela Zacarías =

Mexican tennis player

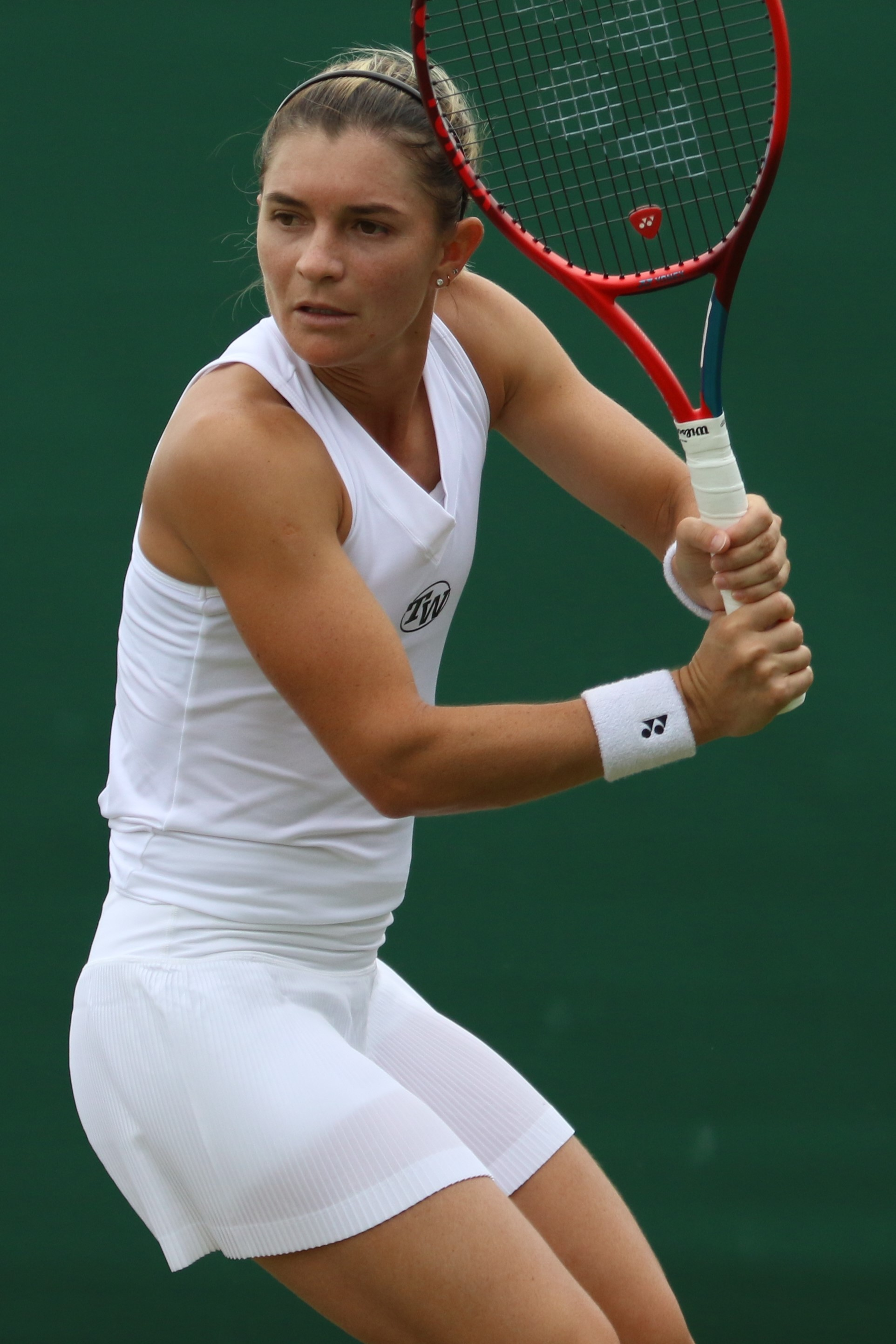
- Zacarías at the 2023 Wimbledon Championships
- Full name: Marcela Zacarías Valle
- Country (sports): Mexico
- Born: 26 March 1994 (age 32) San Luis Potosí, Mexico
- Height: 1.60 m (5 ft 3 in)
- Retired: (last match played April 2024)
- Plays: Right (two-handed backhand)
- Prize money: $382,294

Singles
- Career record: 303–212
- Career titles: 17 ITF
- Highest ranking: No. 159 (24 October 2022)

Grand Slam singles results
- Australian Open: Q1 (2016, 2023)
- French Open: Q1 (2023)
- Wimbledon: Q1 (2022, 2023)
- US Open: Q2 (2015)

Doubles
- Career record: 244–146
- Career titles: 28 ITF
- Highest ranking: No. 119 (24 October 2022)

Team competitions
- Fed Cup: 21–12
Medal record
Representing MEX
Women's tennis
Pan American Games
Silver medal – second place	2015 Toronto	Doubles
Central American and Caribbean Games
Gold medal – first place	2014 Veracruz	Doubles
Gold medal – first place	2014 Veracruz	Team event
Gold medal – first place	2014 Veracruz	Mixed doubles

Marcela Zacarías Valle (Note: In this Spanish name, the first or paternal surname is Zacarías and the second or maternal family name is Valle.) (born 26 March 1994), known as Marcela Zacarías (Latin American Spanish: [maɾˈsela sakaˈɾi.as]), is a Mexican former tennis player. She has a career-high singles ranking of world No. 159, and a best doubles ranking of No. 119, both achieved on 24 October 2022.

Zacarías has won 17 singles titles and 28 doubles titles on the ITF Circuit, and made her debut for the Mexico Fed Cup team in 2012. Playing for her country in BJK Cup, she has a career win–loss record of 21–12.

Zacarías achieved greater success on the ITF Junior Circuit, having reached a career-high combined ranking of world No. 7, on 2 December 2012.

== Personal life ==
In the 2021 distributed film King Richard, Zacarías played 14-time Grand-Slam-champion Arantxa Sánchez Vicario.

== Performance timeline ==
Key
W	F	SF	QF	#R	RR	Q#	DNQ	A	NH

(W) winner; (F) finalist; (SF) semifinalist; (QF) quarterfinalist; (#R) rounds 4, 3, 2, 1; (RR) round-robin stage; (Q#) qualification round; (DNQ) did not qualify; (A) absent; (NH) not held; (SR) strike rate (events won / competed); (W–L) win–loss record.
To avoid confusion and double counting, these charts are updated at the conclusion of a tournament or when the player's participation has ended.

Only main-draw results in WTA Tour, Grand Slam tournaments, Fed Cup/Billie Jean King Cup and Olympic Games are included in win–loss records.

=== Singles ===
Tournament	2014	2015	2016	...	2021	2022	2023	SR	W–L
Grand Slam tournaments
Australian Open	A	A	Q1		A	A	Q1	0 / 0	0–0
French Open	A	A	A		A	A	Q1	0 / 0	0–0
Wimbledon	A	A	A		A	Q1	Q1	0 / 0	0–0
US Open	A	Q2	A		A	A	Q1	0 / 0	0–0
Win–loss	0–0	0–0	0–0		0–0	0–0	0–0	0 / 0	0–0
Career statistics
Tournaments	2	1	1		0	3	0	Career total: 7	
Overall win-loss	0–2	0–1	0–1		1–1	1–4	0–0	0 / 9	2–9
Year-end ranking	350	190	532		244	196	387	$382,294	

== ITF Circuit finals ==
=== Singles: 24 (17 titles, 7 runner-ups) ===
Legend $80,000 tournaments $60,000 tournaments $25,000 tournaments $10/15,000 tournaments	Finals by surface Hard (17–6) Clay (0–1)

Result	W–L	Date	Tournament	Tier	Surface	Opponent	Score
Win	1–0	Oct 2012	ITF Mexico City	10,000	Hard	(Mexico) Victoria Rodríguez	6–4, 6–2
Win	2–0	Oct 2012	ITF Mexico City	10,000	Hard	(Russia) Nika Kukharchuk	7–5, 6–1
Win	3–0	Mar 2013	ITF Metepec, Mexico	10,000	Hard	(Austria) Nicole Rottmann	6–1, 6–1
Loss	3–1	Jun 2013	ITF Quintana Roo, Mexico	10,000	Hard	(Mexico) Ana Sofía Sánchez	1–6, 3–6
Win	4–1	May 2014	ITF Antalya, Turkey	10,000	Hard	(Ukraine) Alyona Sotnikova	6–3, ret.
Win	5–1	Jun 2014	ITF Coatzacoalcos, Mexico	10,000	Hard	(Mexico) Ximena Hermoso	6–3, 7–6^{(3)}
Loss	5–2	Jun 2014	ITF Quintana Roo, Mexico	10,000	Hard	(Mexico) Ana Sofía Sánchez	6–4, 4–6, 0–6
Loss	5–3	Aug 2014	ITF Rosarito Beach, Mexico	10,000	Hard	(Mexico) Victoria Rodríguez	3–6, 1–6
Win	6–3	Aug 2014	ITF San Luis Potosí, Mexico	10,000	Hard	(United States) Lauren Embree	6–3, 3–6, 6–1
Win	7–3	Feb 2015	ITF Cuernavaca, Mexico	25,000	Hard	(Serbia) Nina Stojanović	6–3, 6–2
Win	8–3	Mar 2015	ITF Metepec, Mexico	10,000	Hard	(Brazil) Maria Fernanda Alves	6–4, 7–5
Win	9–3	Apr 2015	ITF Guadalajara, Mexico	15,000	Hard	(Mexico) Victoria Rodríguez	4–6, 6–4, 7–5
Win	10–3	May 2015	ITF Obregon, Mexico	15,000	Hard	(Serbia) Vojislava Lukić	6–4, 5–7, 2–1 ret.
Win	11–3	Jul 2016	ITF Austin, United States	10,000	Hard	(United States) Ashley Kratzer	7–5, 6–4
Loss	11–4	Jul 2017	ITF Evansville, US	15,000	Hard	(United States) Ann Li	6–4, 4–6, 3–6
Loss	11–5	Dec 2017	Copa Santiago, Chile	25,000	Clay	(United States) Chiara Scholl	3–6, 2–6
Win	12–5	Apr 2019	ITF Cancún, Mexico	W15	Hard	(Mexico) Andrea Renee Villarreal	6–4, 6–0
Win	13–5	Apr 2019	ITF Cancún, Mexico	W15	Hard	(Mexico) Ana Sofía Sánchez	6–0, 7–5
Win	14–5	May 2019	ITF Cancún, Mexico	W15	Hard	(Mexico) María Portillo Ramírez	6–3, 6–1
Win	15–5	May 2019	ITF Cancún, Mexico	W15	Hard	(Romania) Patricia Maria Tig	6–3, 6–3
Loss	15–6	Nov 2019	ITF Tucson, United States	W25	Hard	(United States) Hailey Baptiste	6–4, 4–6, 3–6
Win	16–6	Dec 2019	ITF Cancún, Mexico	W15	Hard	(France) Aubane Droguet	6–2, 6–3
Loss	16–7	Oct 2021	Berkeley Challenge, US	W60	Hard	(United States) Usue Maitane Arconada	1–6, 3–6
Win	17–7	Oct 2022	Rancho Santa Fe Open, US	W80	Hard	(United States) Katrina Scott	6–1, 6–2

=== Doubles: 44 (28 titles, 16 runner-ups) ===
Legend $100,000 tournaments $80,000 tournaments $60,000 tournaments $25,000 tournaments $10/15,000 tournaments	Finals by surface Hard (22–12) Clay (6–4)

Result	W–L	Date	Tournament	Tier	Surface	Partner	Opponents	Score
Win	1–0	Oct 2012	ITF Mexico City	10,000	Hard	(Mexico) Ximena Hermoso	(Russia) Nika Kukharchuk (United States) Jessica Lawrence	6–3, 7–5
Loss	1–1	Mar 2013	ITF Metepec, Mexico	10,000	Hard	(Brazil) Laura Pigossi	(United States) Macall Harkins (Austria) Nicole Rottmann	3–6, 2–6
Win	2–1	Jun 2013	ITF El Paso, United States	25,000	Hard	(Venezuela) Adriana Pérez	(Oman) Fatma Al-Nabhani (United States) Keri Wong	6–3, 6–3
Loss	2–2	Aug 2013	ITF San Luis Potosí, Mexico	15,000	Hard	(Mexico) Ana Sofía Sánchez	(Mexico) Carolina Betancourt (Mexico) Camila Fuentes	3–6, 4–6
Win	3–2	Apr 2014	ITF Antalya, Turkey	10,000	Hard	(Mexico) Victoria Rodríguez	(Mexico) Camila Fuentes (Hungary) Szabina Szlavikovics	6–1, 6–1
Win	4–2	Apr 2014	ITF Antalya, Turkey	10,000	Hard	(Mexico) Victoria Rodríguez	(Ukraine) Alona Fomina (Chinese Taipei) Lee Pei-chi	6–4, 4–6, [10–5]
Win	5–2	May 2014	ITF Antalya, Turkey	10,000	Hard	(Mexico) Victoria Rodríguez	(United States) Alexa Guarachi (United States) Kate Turvy	6–1, 1–6, [10–4]
Win	6–2	Jun 2014	ITF Coatzacoalcos, Mexico	10,000	Hard	(Mexico) Camila Fuentes	(Colombia) María Paulina Pérez (Colombia) Paula Andrea Pérez	6–2, 6–2
Loss	6–3	Jun 2014	ITF Quintana Roo, Mexico	10,000	Hard	(Mexico) Victoria Rodríguez	(United States) Anamika Bhargava (United States) Allie Will	2–6, 2–6
Loss	6–4	Jun 2014	ITF Quintana Roo, Mexico	10,000	Hard	(Mexico) Victoria Rodríguez	(United States) Anamika Bhargava (United States) Allie Will	0–6, 4–6
Win	7–4	Aug 2014	ITF Rosarito Beach, Mexico	10,000	Hard	(Mexico) Victoria Rodríguez	(United States) Alexandra Cercone (United States) Alexa Guarachi	6–4, 6–1
Win	8–4	Aug 2014	ITF San Luis Potosí, Mexico	10,000	Hard	(Mexico) Victoria Rodríguez	(United States) Erin Clark (Japan) Ayaka Okuno	6–1, 5–7, [10–8]
Win	9–4	Feb 2015	ITF Cuernavaca, Mexico	25,000	Hard	(Mexico) Victoria Rodríguez	(United States) Alexandra Morozova (United States) Daniella Roldan	6–4, 6–0
Win	10–4	Mar 2015	ITF Irapuato, Mexico	25,000	Hard	(Mexico) Victoria Rodríguez	(Japan) Ayaka Okuno (Mexico) Ana Sofía Sánchez	6–1, 7–5
Loss	10–5	Mar 2015	ITF Metepec, Mexico	10,000	Hard	(Mexico) Victoria Rodríguez	(Brazil) Maria Fernanda Alves (United States) Kaitlyn Christian	6–2, 1–6, [13–15]
Win	11–5	Apr 2015	ITF Guadalajara, Mexico	15,000	Hard	(Brazil) Laura Pigossi	(Brazil) Maria Fernanda Alves (Mexico) Renata Zarazúa	6–1, 6–2
Win	12–5	May 2015	ITF Obregón, Mexico	15,000	Hard	(Mexico) Victoria Rodríguez	(Mexico) Ana Sofía Sánchez (Dominican Republic) Francesca Segarelli	6–3, 6–1
Win	13–5	May 2016	ITF Madrid, Spain	10,000	Clay	(Mexico) Renata Zarazua	(Norway) Andrea Raaholt (Bosnia and Herzegovina) Jasmina Tinjic	6–4, 6–4
Loss	13–6	Mar 2017	ITF Orlando, US	15,000	Clay	(United States) Chiara Scholl	(United States) Emina Bektas (United States) Sanaz Marand	1–6, 3–6
Loss	13–7	Apr 2017	ITF Irapuato, Mexico	25,000	Hard	(United States) Ronit Yurovsky	(United States) Desirae Krawczyk (Mexico) Giuliana Olmos	1–6, 0–6
Win	14–7	Jun 2017	ITF Victoria, Canada	15,000	Hard (i)	(Mexico) Andrea Villarreal	(United States) Frances Altick (United States) Alexa Graham	7–5, 6–4
Win	15–7	Dec 2017	ITF Santiago, Chile	15,000	Clay	(United States) Chiara Scholl	(Argentina) Eugenia Ganga (Argentina) Melany Solange Krywoj	7–6^{(2)}, 4–6, [10–6]
Win	16–7	Feb 2018	ITF Curitiba, Brazil	25,000	Clay	(Chinese Taipei) Hsu Chieh-yu	(France) Audrey Albié (France) Harmony Tan	6–0, 6–3
Loss	16–8	Mar 2018	ITF São Paulo, Brazil	25,000	Clay	(Chinese Taipei) Hsu Chieh-yu	(United Kingdom) Tara Moore (Switzerland) Conny Perrin	4–6, 6–3, [11–13]
Loss	16–9	Mar 2018	ITF Campinas, Brazil	15,000	Clay	(Paraguay) Lara Escauriza	(Chile) Fernanda Brito (Paraguay) Camila Giangreco Campiz	4–6, 6–4, [4–10]
Loss	16–10	Jul 2018	ITF Gatineau, Canada	25,000	Hard	(Chinese Taipei) Hsu Chieh-yu	(Canada) Bianca Andreescu (Canada) Carson Branstine	6–4, 2–6, [4–10]
Win	17–10	Aug 2018	ITF Fort Worth, US	25,000	Hard	(Chinese Taipei) Hsu Chieh-yu	(Japan) Ayaka Okuno (Australia) Olivia Tjandramulia	3–6, 7–6^{(6)}, [10–6]
Win	18–10	Apr 2019	ITF Cancún, Mexico	W15	Hard	(Mexico) Victoria Rodríguez	(Japan) Lily Miyazaki (France) Mathilde Armitano	6–2, 6–0
Win	19–10	Apr 2019	ITF Cancún, Mexico	W15	Hard	(Mexico) Andrea Villarreal	(Australia) Alicia Smith (United States) Madison Westby	walkover
Win	20–10	May 2019	ITF Cancún, Mexico	W15	Hard	(Mexico) María Portillo Ramírez	(Brazil) Eduarda Piai (Guatemala) Kirsten-Andrea Weedon	6–2, 6–2
Win	21–10	May 2019	ITF Cancún, Mexico	W15	Hard	(Mexico) María Portillo Ramírez	(Brazil) Thaisa Grana Pedretti (Brazil) Eduarda Piai	6–3, 7–6^{(10)}
Win	22–10	Jul 2019	ITF Saskatoon, Canada	W25	Hard	(Chinese Taipei) Hsu Chieh-yu	(Japan) Haruka Kaji (Japan) Momoko Kobori	6–3, 6–2
Loss	22–11	Jul 2019	ITF Gatineau, Canada	W25	Hard	(Chinese Taipei) Hsu Chieh-yu	(Canada) Leylah Fernandez (Canada) Rebecca Marino	6–7^{(5)}, 3–6
Win	23–11	Aug 2019	ITF Guayaquil, Ecuador	W25	Clay	(Chinese Taipei) Hsu Chieh-yu	(Colombia) Emiliana Arango (United States) Katerina Stewart	6–4, 6–2
Loss	23–12	Sep 2019	ITF Templeton Pro, US	W60	Hard	(Romania) Gabriela Talabă	(Montenegro) Vladica Babić (United States) Caitlin Whoriskey	4–6, 2–6
Loss	23–13	Oct 2019	ITF Florence, US	W25	Hard	(Australia) Olivia Tjandramulia	(United States) Emina Bektas (United Kingdom) Tara Moore	5–7, 4–6
Win	24–13	Oct 2019	ITF Dallas, US	W25	Hard	(Australia) Olivia Tjandramulia	(United States) Jamie Loeb (United Kingdom) Emily Appleton	6–3, 6–4
Loss	24–14	Nov 2019	Tyler Pro Challenge, US	W80	Hard	(Chinese Taipei) Hsu Chieh-yu	(Indonesia) Beatrice Gumulya (Indonesia) Jessy Rompies	2–6, 3–6
Win	25–14	Dec 2019	ITF Cancún, Mexico	W15	Hard	(Brazil) Eduarda Piai	(Russia) Nika Kukharchuk (United Kingdom) Emilie Lindh	2–6, 6–1, [10–7]
Win	26–14	May 2021	ITF Pelham, US	W25	Clay	(Mexico) Fernanda Contreras	(Japan) Erina Hayashi (Japan) Kanako Morisaki	6–0, 6–3
Win	27–14	Oct 2021	Tyler Pro Challenge, US	W80	Hard	(Mexico) Giuliana Olmos	(Japan) Misaki Doi (Poland) Katarzyna Kawa	7–5, 1–6, [10–5]
Loss	27–15	Jul 2022	LTP Charleston Pro, US	W100	Clay	(Hungary) Tímea Babos	(United States) Alycia Parks (United States) Sachia Vickery	4–6, 7–5, [5–10]
Loss	27–16	Oct 2022	Rancho Santa Fe Open, US	W80	Hard	(Mexico) Giuliana Olmos	(United States) Elvina Kalieva (Poland) Katarzyna Kawa	1–6, 6–3, [2–10]
Win	28–16	Jul 2023	Championnats de Granby, Canada	W100	Clay	(Mexico) Renata Zarazúa	(United States) Carmen Corley (United States) Ivana Corley	6–3, 6–3

== Fed Cup/Billie Jean King Cup participation ==
=== Singles (7–0) ===
Edition	Round	Date	Location	Against	Surface	Opponent	W/L	Score
2012	Z2 RR	Apr 2012	Guadalajara (MEX)	Costa Rica	Clay	Mariela Haug	W	6–2, 6–1
2012	Z2 RR	Apr 2012	Guadalajara (MEX)	Puerto Rico	Clay	Yolimar Ogando	W	6–2, 6–1
2012	Z2 RR	Apr 2012	Guadalajara (MEX)	Uruguay	Clay	Sara Quiroga	W	6–1, 6–0
2012	Z2 PO	Apr 2012	Guadalajara (MEX)	Trinidad and Tobago	Clay	Anneliese Rose	W	6–1, 6–1
2013	Z1 RR	Feb 2013	Medellín (COL)	Paraguay	Clay	Camila Giangreco Campiz	W	6–3, 3–6, 6–3
2013	Z1 RR	Feb 2013	Medellín (COL)	Chile	Clay	Fernanda Brito	W	4–6, 6–0, 6–4
2013	Z1 PO	Feb 2013	Medellín (COL)	Peru	Clay	Ferny Angeles Paz	W	6–3, 6–3

=== Doubles (0–1) ===
Edition	Round	Date	Location	Against	Surface	Partner	Opponents	W/L	Score
2012	Z2 RR	Apr 2012	Guadalajara (MEX)	Chile	Clay	Ana Paula de la Peña	Cecilia Melgar Costa; Camila Silva	L	6–1, 4–6, 3–6
