= 2012 Fed Cup Americas Zone Group I – Pool A =

Group A of the 2012 Fed Cup Americas Zone Group I was one of two pools in the Americas zone of the 2012 Fed Cup. Five teams competed in a round robin competition, with the top team and the bottom two teams proceeding to their respective sections of the play-offs: the top teams played for advancement to the World Group II Play-offs, while the bottom teams faced potential relegation to Group II.

		(Canada) CAN	(Argentina) ARG	(Peru) PER	(The Bahamas) BAH	RR; W–L	Set; W–L	Game; W–L	Standings
18	Canada		3–0	2–1	3–0	2–1	11–8	90–67	2
21	Argentina	3–0		3–0	3–0	3–0	18–0	109–36	1
37	Peru	1–2	0–3		3–0	1–2	8–11	73–90	3
43	Bahamas	0–3	0–3	0–3		0–3	0–18	30–109	4

== Canada vs. Peru ==
Canada
2
Graciosa Country Club, Curitiba, Brazil
February 1, 2012
Red clay (outdoors)

Peru
1

			1	2	3
1	(Canada) (Peru)	Aleksandra Wozniak; Patricia Kú Flores	6; 4	6; 2
2	(Canada) (Peru)	Stéphanie Dubois; Bianca Botto	2; 6	7^{7} 6^{1}	5; 7
3	(Canada) (Peru)	Marie-Ève Pelletier / Aleksandra Wozniak; Patricia Kú Flores / Katherine Miranda Chang	6; 1	6; 0

== Argentina vs. Bahamas ==
Argentina
3
Graciosa Country Club, Curitiba, Brazil
February 1, 2012
Red clay (outdoors)

Bahamas
0

			1	2	3
1	(Argentina) (The Bahamas)	Paula Ormaechea; Larikah Russell	6; 3	6; 0
2	(Argentina) (The Bahamas)	Florencia Molinero; Simone Pratt	6; 2	6; 0
3	(Argentina) (The Bahamas)	Mailen Auroux / María Irigoyen; Nikkita Fountain / Larikah Russell	6; 3	6; 2

== Canada vs. Argentina ==
Canada
0
Graciosa Country Club, Curitiba, Brazil
February 2, 2012
Red clay (outdoors)

Argentina
3

			1	2	3
1	(Canada) (Argentina)	Aleksandra Wozniak; Paula Ormaechea	5; 7	4; 6
2	(Canada) (Argentina)	Stéphanie Dubois; Florencia Molinero	2; 6	2; 6
3	(Canada) (Argentina)	Sharon Fichman / Marie-Ève Pelletier; Mailen Auroux / María Irigoyen	0; 6	3; 6

== Peru vs. Bahamas ==
Peru
3
Graciosa Country Club, Curitiba, Brazil
February 2, 2012
Red clay (outdoors)

Bahamas
0

			1	2	3
1	(Peru) (The Bahamas)	Patricia Kú Flores; Gabrielle Moxey	6; 1	6; 1
2	(Peru) (The Bahamas)	Bianca Botto; Simone Pratt	7^{7} 6^{4}	6; 3
3	(Peru) (The Bahamas)	Ferny Ángeles Paz / Katherine Miranda Chang; Nikkita Fountain / Larikah Russell	6; 1	6; 4

== Canada vs. Bahamas ==
Canada
3
Graciosa Country Club, Curitiba, Brazil
February 3, 2012
Red clay (outdoors)

Bahamas
0

			1	2	3
1	(Canada) (The Bahamas)	Marie-Ève Pelletier; Gabrielle Moxey	6; 1	6; 0
2	(Canada) (The Bahamas)	Stéphanie Dubois; Simone Pratt	6; 1	6; 1
3	(Canada) (The Bahamas)	Sharon Fichman / Marie-Ève Pelletier; Nikkita Fountain / Gabrielle Moxey	6; 1	6; 0

== Argentina vs. Peru ==
Argentina
3
Graciosa Country Club, Curitiba, Brazil
February 3, 2012
Red clay (outdoors)

Peru
0

			1	2	3
1	(Argentina) (Peru)	Paula Ormaechea; Ferny Ángeles Paz	6; 1	6; 0
2	(Argentina) (Peru)	Florencia Molinero; Patricia Kú Flores	7; 5	6; 4
3	(Argentina) (Peru)	Mailen Auroux / María Irigoyen; Ferny Ángeles Paz / Katherine Miranda Chang	6; 0	6; 0

== See also ==
- Fed Cup structure
