= 2012 Fed Cup Americas Zone Group I – Pool B =

International tennis competition

Group B of the 2012 Fed Cup Americas Zone Group I was one of two pools in the Americas zone of the 2012 Fed Cup. Five teams competed in a round robin competition, with the top team and the bottom two teams proceeding to their respective sections of the play-offs: the top teams played for advancement to the World Group II Play-offs, while the bottom teams faced potential relegation to Group II.

		(Colombia) COL	(Paraguay) PAR	(Brazil) BRA	(Venezuela) VEN	(Bolivia) BOL	RR; W–L	Set; W–L	Game; W–L	Standings
20	Colombia		2–1	2–1	3–0	3–0	4–0	22–6	155–86	1
22	Paraguay	1–2		2–1	2–1	3–0	3–1	16–9	113–95	2
28	Brazil	1–2	1–2		2–1	3–0	2–2	14–11	121–90	3
50	Venezuela	0–3	1–2	1–2		3–0	1–3	12–14	108–115	4
56	Bolivia	0–3	0–3	0–3	0–3		0–4	0–24	47–148	5

== Colombia vs. Venezuela ==
Colombia
3
Graciosa Country Club, Curitiba, Brazil
January 30, 2012
Red clay (outdoors)

Venezuela
0

			1	2	3
1	(Colombia) (Venezuela)	Catalina Castaño; Gabriela Paz	7^{17} 6^{15}	7; 5
2	(Colombia) (Venezuela)	Mariana Duque Mariño; Andrea Gámiz	6; 2	6; 2
3	(Colombia) (Venezuela)	Catalina Castaño / Mariana Duque Mariño; Andrea Gámiz / Adriana Pérez	6^{5} 7^{7}	6; 0	6; 0

== Paraguay vs. Bolivia ==
Paraguay
3
Graciosa Country Club, Curitiba, Brazil
January 30, 2012
Red clay (outdoors)

Bolivia
0

			1	2	3
1	(Paraguay) (Bolivia)	Montserrat González; Belén Rivera	6; 2	6; 1
2	(Paraguay) (Bolivia)	Verónica Cepede Royg; Noelia Zeballos	6; 1	6; 0
3	(Paraguay) (Bolivia)	Montserrat González / Isabella Robbiani; Belén Rivera / Noelia Zeballos	6; 1	7; 5

== Colombia vs. Bolivia ==
Colombia
3
Graciosa Country Club, Curitiba, Brazil
January 31, 2012
Red clay (outdoors)

Bolivia
0

			1	2	3
1	(Colombia) (Bolivia)	Yuliana Lizarazo; Nabila Farah	6; 3	7; 5
2	(Colombia) (Bolivia)	Mariana Duque Mariño; Noelia Zeballos	6; 1	6; 0
3	(Colombia) (Bolivia)	Catalina Castaño / Mariana Duque Mariño; Natalia Dávila / Noelia Zeballos	6; 1	7; 5

== Paraguay vs. Brazil ==
Paraguay
2
Graciosa Country Club, Curitiba, Brazil
January 31, 2012
Red clay (outdoors)

Brazil
1

			1	2	3
1	(Paraguay) (Brazil)	Montserrat González; Vivian Segnini	0; 6	2; 6
2	(Paraguay) (Brazil)	Verónica Cepede Royg; Roxane Vaisemberg	6; 3	6; 2
3	(Paraguay) (Brazil)	Verónica Cepede Royg / Montserrat González; Ana Clara Duarte / Roxane Vaisemberg	6; 3	6; 4

== Colombia vs. Paraguay ==
Colombia
2
Graciosa Country Club, Curitiba, Brazil
February 1, 2012
Red clay (outdoors)

Paraguay
1

			1	2	3
1	(Colombia) (Paraguay)	Catalina Castaño; Montserrat González	6; 1	6; 3
2	(Colombia) (Paraguay)	Mariana Duque Mariño; Verónica Cepede Royg	4; 6	4; 6
3	(Colombia) (Paraguay)	Catalina Castaño / Mariana Duque Mariño; Verónica Cepede Royg / Montserrat González	6; 2	6; 3

== Brazil vs. Venezuela ==
Brazil
2
Graciosa Country Club, Curitiba, Brazil
February 1, 2012
Red clay (outdoors)

Venezuela
1

			1	2	3
1	(Brazil) (Venezuela)	Beatriz Haddad Maia; Gabriela Paz	6^{3} 7^{7}	2; 6
2	(Brazil) (Venezuela)	Vivian Segnini; Adriana Pérez	6; 4	6; 1
3	(Brazil) (Venezuela)	Vivian Segnini / Roxane Vaisemberg; Gabriela Paz / Adriana Pérez	6; 0	6; 3

== Paraguay vs. Venezuela ==
Paraguay
2
Graciosa Country Club, Curitiba, Brazil
February 2, 2012
Red clay (outdoors)

Venezuela
1

			1	2	3
1	(Paraguay) (Venezuela)	Isabella Robbiani; Gabriela Paz	3; 6	0; 6
2	(Paraguay) (Venezuela)	Verónica Cepede Royg; Andrea Gámiz	6; 4	6; 0
3	(Paraguay) (Venezuela)	Verónica Cepede Royg / Montserrat González; Gabriela Paz / Adriana Pérez	2; 6	6; 4	6; 3

== Brazil vs. Bolivia ==
Brazil
3
Graciosa Country Club, Curitiba, Brazil
February 2, 2012
Red clay (outdoors)

Bolivia
0

			1	2	3
1	(Brazil) (Bolivia)	Beatriz Haddad Maia; Nabila Farah	6; 1	6; 1
2	(Brazil) (Bolivia)	Roxane Vaisemberg; Noelia Zeballos	6; 2	6; 1
3	(Brazil) (Bolivia)	Ana Clara Duarte / Vivian Segnini; Nabila Farah / Noelia Zeballos	7^{7} 6^{1}	6; 1

== Colombia vs. Brazil ==
Colombia
2
Graciosa Country Club, Curitiba, Brazil
February 3, 2012
Red clay (outdoors)

Brazil
1

			1	2	3
1	(Colombia) (Brazil)	Catalina Castaño; Vivian Segnini	3; 6	7; 5	6^{3} 7^{7}
2	(Colombia) (Brazil)	Mariana Duque Mariño; Roxane Vaisemberg	7; 5	6; 0
3	(Colombia) (Brazil)	Catalina Castaño / Yuliana Lizarazo; Vivian Segnini / Roxane Vaisemberg	6; 2	6; 3

== Venezuela vs. Bolivia ==
Venezuela
3
Graciosa Country Club, Curitiba, Brazil
February 3, 2012
Red clay (outdoors)

Bolivia
0

			1	2	3
1	(Venezuela) (Bolivia)	Gabriela Paz; Natalia Dávila	6; 0	6; 0
2	(Venezuela) (Bolivia)	Andrea Gámiz; Noelia Zeballos	6; 4	6; 4
3	(Venezuela) (Bolivia)	Gabriela Coglitore / Adriana Pérez; Natalia Dávila / Belén Rivera	6; 1	6; 1

== See also ==
- Fed Cup structure
