= 2012 Fed Cup Americas Zone Group I – play-offs =

Tennis competition play-offs

The play-offs of the 2011 Fed Cup Americas Zone Group I were the final stages of the Group I Zonal Competition involving teams from the Americas. Using the positions determined in their pools, the nine teams faced off to determine their placing in the 2012 Fed Cup Americas Zone Group I, the top countries of each pool played for first to second, while the bottom two of each pool competed for sixth and ninth. The top team advanced to World Group II play-offs, and the bottom two teams were relegated down to the Americas Zone Group II for the next year.

Placing	Pool A	Pool B
1	Argentina	Colombia
2	Canada	Paraguay
3		Brazil
4	Peru	Venezuela
5	Bahamas	Bolivia

== Promotion play-offs ==
The first placed teams of each pool were drawn in a head-to-head round. The winner of the round advanced to the World Group II play-offs, where they would get a chance to advanced to World Group II.

=== Argentina vs. Colombia ===
Argentina
2
Graciosa Country Club, Curitiba, Brazil
February 4, 2012
Red clay (outdoors)

Colombia
0

			1	2	3
1	(Argentina) (Colombia)	Paula Ormaechea; Catalina Castaño	6; 2	6; 4
2	(Argentina) (Colombia)	Florencia Molinero; Mariana Duque	3; 6	6; 2	6; 1
3	(Argentina) (Colombia)					not played

== 3rd to 4th play-offs ==
The second placed teams of each pool were drawn in head-to-head rounds to find the third and fourth placed teams.

=== Canada vs. Paraguay ===
Canada
0
Graciosa Country Club, Curitiba, Brazil
February 4, 2012
Red clay (outdoors)

Paraguay
2

			1	2	3
1	(Canada) (Paraguay)	Marie-Ève Pelletier; Montserrat González	6; 2	3; 6	4; 6
2	(Canada) (Paraguay)	Sharon Fichman; Verónica Cepede Royg	6; 2	2; 6	3; 6
3	(Canada) (Paraguay)					not played

== Relegation play-offs ==
The last placed teams of each pool were drawn in head-to-head rounds. The loser of each round was relegated down to Americas Zone Group II in 2013.

=== Peru vs. Bolivia ===
Peru
2
Graciosa Country Club, Curitiba, Brazil
February 4, 2012
Red clay (outdoors)

Bolivia
0

			1	2	3
1	(Peru) (Bolivia)	Patricia Kú Flores; Nabila Farah	6; 0	6; 3
2	(Peru) (Bolivia)	Bianca Botto; Noelia Zeballos	6; 2	6; 2
3	(Peru) (Bolivia)					not played

=== Bahamas vs. Venezuela ===
Bahamas
0
Graciosa Country Club, Curitiba, Brazil
February 4, 2012
Red clay (outdoors)

Venezuela
2

			1	2	3
1	(The Bahamas) (Venezuela)	Nikkita Fountain; Gabriela Paz	2; 6	0; 6
2	(The Bahamas) (Venezuela)	Simone Pratt; Andrea Gámiz	4; 6	2; 6
3	(The Bahamas) (Venezuela)					not played

== Final placements ==
Placing	Teams
Promoted	Argentina
Second	Colombia
Third	Paraguay
Fourth	Canada
Fifth	Brazil
Sixth	Peru
Sixth	Venezuela
Relegated	Bolivia
Relegated	Bahamas

- Argentina advanced to World Group II play-offs where they were drawn against China. They won 4–1, and thus proceeded to World Group II for 2013.
- Bolivia and Bahamas were relegated down to 2013 Fed Cup Americas Zone Group II.

== See also ==
- Fed Cup structure
