= Ivette López =

Mexican tennis player (born 1990)

- Country (sports): Mexico
- Born: July 12, 1990 (age 36)
- Plays: Right (two-handed backhand)
- Prize money: $10,772

Singles
- Career record: 7–45
- Highest ranking: No. 1046 (17 December 2007)

Doubles
- Career record: 47–66
- Career titles: 4 ITF
- Highest ranking: No. 498 (7 May 2012)

Ivette López (born 12 July 1990) is a Mexican former professional tennis player. She has not competed on tour since May 2013.

López reached career-high WTA rankings of 1046 in singles and 498 in doubles.

== ITF Circuit finals ==
=== Doubles (4–4) ===
Legend
$50,000 tournaments
$25,000 tournaments
$10,000 tournaments

Result	Date	Location	Surface	Partner	Opponents	Score
Loss	Nov 2010	La Marsa, Tunisia	Clay	(Mexico) Ximena Hermoso	(United Kingdom) Amanda Carreras (Spain) Sheila Solsona Carcasona	4–6, 5–7
Win	May 2011	Gran Canaria, Spain	Clay	(Mexico) Ximena Hermoso	(Italy) Nicole Clerico (Italy) Martina Caciotti	6–2, 6–3
Win	May 2011	Tenerife, Spain	Clay	(Mexico) Ximena Hermoso	(Japan) Yuka Mori (Japan) Kaori Onishi	6–4, 7–5
Loss	Jun 2011	Montemor-o-Novo, Portugal	Hard	(Mexico) Ximena Hermoso	(Venezuela) Andrea Gámiz (United Kingdom) Amanda Carreras	3–6, 4–6
Loss	Jul 2011	Casablanca, Morocco	Clay	(Mexico) Ximena Hermoso	(Tunisia) Nour Abbès (Poland) Agata Barańska	4–6, 2–6
Loss	Oct 2011	Montego Bay, Jamaica	Hard	(Mexico) Ximena Hermoso	(United States) Jennifer Brady (Czech Republic) Nikola Hübnerová	3–6, 1–6
Win	Mar 2012	Puebla, Mexico	Hard	(Mexico) Ana Paula de la Peña	(Brazil) Flávia Guimarães Bueno (Chile) Cecilia Costa Melgar	6–1, 7–6^{(0)}
Win	Jun 2012	Amarante, Portugal	Hard	(Spain) Nuria Párrizas Díaz	(Poland) Olga Brózda (Poland) Natalia Kołat	w/o
