= Laura Ucrós =

Colombian tennis player

- Full name: Laura Ucrós Téllez
- Country (sports): Colombia
- Born: 13 June 1995 (age 29); Bogotá, Colombia
- Plays: Right (two-handed backhand)

Singles
- Career record: 85–47
- Highest ranking: No. 946 (11 July 2011)

Doubles
- Career record: 71–44

Laura Ucrós Téllez (born 13 June 1995) is a Colombian former tennis player.

On 21 January 2013, Ucrós reached her best junior world ranking of 32. She has a 1–1 record for Colombia in Fed Cup competition.

In August 2020, Ucrós started her Master in Business Administration (MBA) at Harvard Business School.

== ITF finals ==
=== Doubles (0–1) ===
Legend $25,000 tournaments $10,000 tournaments	Finals by surface Hard (0–0) Clay (0–1)

Result	Date	Tournament	Surface	Partner	Opponents	Score
Loss	17 September 2012	Bogotá, Colombia	Clay	(United States) Blair Shankle	(Colombia) Yuliana Lizarazo (Brazil) Laura Pigossi	2–6, 2–6
