= 2013 Fed Cup World Group II play-offs =

Part of tennis tournament

The World Group II play-offs were four ties which involved the losing nations of the World Group II and four nations from the three Zonal Group I competitions. Nations that won their play-off ties entered the 2014 World Group, while losing nations joined their respective zonal groups.

== Belgium vs. Poland ==
Belgium
1
Tennisclub Koksijde, Koksijde, Belgium
20–21 April 2013
Hard (indoors)

Poland
4

| | | | 1 | 2 | 3 |
|---|---|---|---|---|---|
| 1 | (Belgium) (Poland) | Alison Van Uytvanck; Agnieszka Radwańska | 2; 6 | 4; 6 |
| 2 | (Belgium) (Poland) | Kirsten Flipkens; Urszula Radwańska | 6; 4 | 6; 3 |
| 3 | (Belgium) (Poland) | Kirsten Flipkens; Agnieszka Radwańska | 6; 4 | 1; 6 | 2; 6 |
| 4 | (Belgium) (Poland) | Alison Van Uytvanck; Urszula Radwańska | 1; 6 | 4; 6 |
| 5 | (Belgium) (Poland) | Ysaline Bonaventure / An-Sophie Mestach; Katarzyna Piter / Alicja Rosolska | 3; 6 | 6; 4 | [7] [10] |

== France vs. Kazakhstan ==
France
4
Palais des Sports de Besançon, Besançon, France
20–21 April 2013
Hard (indoors)

Kazakhstan
1

| | | | 1 | 2 | 3 |
|---|---|---|---|---|---|
| 1 | (France) (Kazakhstan) | Marion Bartoli; Galina Voskoboeva | 6; 0 | 6; 3 |
| 2 | (France) (Kazakhstan) | Alizé Cornet; Yaroslava Shvedova | 6; 2 | 3; 6 | 2; 6 |
| 3 | (France) (Kazakhstan) | Marion Bartoli; Yaroslava Shvedova | 6; 4 | 6; 3 |
| 4 | (France) (Kazakhstan) | Alizé Cornet; Ksenia Pervak | 6; 3 | 6; 1 |
| 5 | (France) (Kazakhstan) | Caroline Garcia / Kristina Mladenovic; Sesil Karatantcheva / Galina Voskoboeva | 6; 2 | 7; 5 |

== Argentina vs. Great Britain ==
Argentina
3
Estadio Mary Terán de Weiss, Buenos Aires, Argentina
20–21 April 2013
Clay (outdoors)

Great Britain
1

| | | | 1 | 2 | 3 |
|---|---|---|---|---|---|---|
| 1 | (Argentina) (United Kingdom) | Paula Ormaechea; Johanna Konta | 6; 3 | 6; 2 |
| 2 | (Argentina) (United Kingdom) | Florencia Molinero; Laura Robson | 1; 6 | 1; 6 |
| 3 | (Argentina) (United Kingdom) | Paula Ormaechea; Laura Robson | 6; 4 | 4; 6 | 6; 2 |
| 4 | (Argentina) (United Kingdom) | María Irigoyen; Elena Baltacha | 7; 5 | 3; 6 | 6; 1 |
| 5 | (Argentina) (United Kingdom) | Mailen Auroux / María Irigoyen; Anne Keothavong / Laura Robson | | | | not played |

== Ukraine vs. Canada ==
Ukraine
2
Sport Club Meridian, Kyiv, Ukraine
20–21 April 2013
Clay (indoors)

Canada
3

| | | | 1 | 2 | 3 |
|---|---|---|---|---|---|
| 1 | (Ukraine) (Canada) | Elina Svitolina; Eugenie Bouchard | 6^{8} 7^{10} | 6; 3 | 6; 2 |
| 2 | (Ukraine) (Canada) | Lesia Tsurenko; Sharon Fichman | 6^{5} 7^{7} | 6; 2 | 3; 6 |
| 3 | (Ukraine) (Canada) | Lesia Tsurenko; Eugenie Bouchard | 4; 6 | 5; 7 |
| 4 | (Ukraine) (Canada) | Elina Svitolina; Sharon Fichman | 6; 4 | 7^{7} 6^{4} |
| 5 | (Ukraine) (Canada) | Elina Svitolina / Lesia Tsurenko; Sharon Fichman / Eugenie Bouchard | 4; 6 | 3; 6 |

== See also ==
- Fed Cup structure
