= Ana Paula de la Peña =

Mexican tennis player (born 1988)

- Country (sports): Mexico
- Born: 25 July 1988 (age 37) Durango
- Plays: Right-handed
- Prize money: $4,497

Singles
- Career record: 13–19
- Highest ranking: No. 906 (5 March 2012)

Doubles
- Career record: 11–14
- Career titles: 2 ITF
- Highest ranking: No. 669 (18 June 2012)

Ana Paula de la Peña (born 25 July 1988) is a former professional tennis player and member of the Mexico Fed Cup team.

On 5 March 2012, she reached her highest singles ranking by the WTA of 395 whilst her best doubles ranking was world No. 669, on 18 June 2012.

== ITF Circuit finals ==
=== Doubles (2–0) ===
Legend
$100,000 tournaments
$75,000 tournaments
$50,000 tournaments
$25,000 tournaments
$10,000 tournaments

Outcome	No.	Date	Tournament	Surface	Partner	Opponents	Score
Winner	1.	20 June 2011	Zacatecas, Mexico	Hard	(Peru) Ingrid Várgas Calvo	(United States) Whitney Jones (United States) Hilary Toole	3–6, 7–5, [10–8]
Winner	2.	26 March 2012	Puebla, Mexico	Hard	(Mexico) Ivette López	(Brazil) Flávia Guimarães Bueno (Chile) Cecilia Costa Melgar	6–1, 7–6^{(7–0)}
