= Beatriz Haddad Maia career statistics =

Career statistics of Brazilian tennis player

Career finals
Discipline	Type	Won	Lost	Total	WR (Note: Winning rate)
Singles	Grand Slam	–	–	–	–
Singles	WTA Finals	–	–	–	–
Singles	WTA Elite Trophy	1	0	1	1.00
Singles	WTA 1000 (Note: Formerly known as: Category 4 & 5 & 6 (until 1990); Tier I (until 2009); WTA Premier Mandatory and 5 (until 2021))	0	1	1	0.00
Singles	WTA 500 (Note: Formerly known as: Category 3 (until 1990); Tier II (until 2009); WTA Premier (until 2021))	1	0	1	1.00
Singles	WTA 250 (Note: Formerly known as: Category 1 & 2 (until 1990); Tier III & IV & V (until 2009); WTA International (until 2021))	2	2	4	0.50
Singles	Olympics	–	–	–	–
Singles	Total	4	3	7	0.57
Doubles	Grand Slam	0	1	1	0.00
Doubles	WTA Finals	–	–	–	–
Doubles	WTA Elite Trophy	1	0	1	1.00
Doubles	WTA 1000	1	2	3	0.33
Doubles	WTA 500	2	1	3	0.67
Doubles	WTA 250	4	0	4	1.00
Doubles	Olympics	–	–	–	–
Doubles	Total	8	4	12	0.67

This is a list of the main career statistics of professional Brazilian tennis player Beatriz Haddad Maia.

== Performance timelines ==
Key
W	F	SF	QF	#R	RR	Q#	DNQ	A	NH

(W) winner; (F) finalist; (SF) semifinalist; (QF) quarterfinalist; (#R) rounds 4, 3, 2, 1; (RR) round-robin stage; (Q#) qualification round; (DNQ) did not qualify; (A) absent; (NH) not held; (SR) strike rate (events won / competed); (W–L) win–loss record.
To avoid confusion and double counting, these charts are updated at the conclusion of a tournament or when the player's participation has ended.

Only main-draw results in WTA Tour, Grand Slam tournaments, Billie Jean King Cup (Fed Cup), United Cup, Hopman Cup and Olympic Games are included in win–loss records.

=== Singles ===
Current through the 2026 Wimbledon Championships.

Tournament	2012	2013	2014	2015	2016	2017	2018	2019	2020	2021	2022	2023	2024	2025	2026	SR	W–L	Win %
Grand Slam tournaments
Australian Open	A	A	A	A	A	A	2R	2R	A	A	2R	1R	3R	3R	1R	0 / 7	7–7	50%
French Open	A	A	A	Q3	Q2	1R	A	Q1	A	A	2R	SF	1R	1R	1R	0 / 6	6–6	50%
Wimbledon	A	A	A	Q1	A	2R	A	2R	NH	Q3	1R	4R	3R	2R	1R	0 / 7	8–7	53%
US Open	A	A	A	A	Q1	1R	Q2	A	A	Q2	2R	2R	QF	4R		0 / 5	9–5	64%
Win–loss	0–0	0–0	0–0	0–0	0–0	1–3	1–1	2–2	0–0	0–0	3–4	9–4	8–4	6–4	0–3	0 / 25	30–25	55%
Year-end championships
WTA Elite Trophy	DNQ								NH			W	NH			1 / 1	4–0	100%
National representation
Summer Olympics	A	NH			A	NH				A	NH		2R	NH		1 / 1	1–1	50%
Billie Jean King Cup	Z1	A	A	PO	Z1	A	PO	PO	A	A	PO	QR	QR	QR		0 / 0	21–12	64%
WTA 1000 tournaments
Qatar Open	A	A	A	NTI	A	NTI	A	NTI	A	NTI	1R	A	1R	1R	1R	0 / 4	0–4	0%
Dubai Championships	NTI			A	NTI	A	NTI	A	NTI	A	NTI	1R	1R	1R	A	0 / 3	0–3	0%
Indian Wells Open	A	A	A	A	A	A	1R	A	NH	4R	2R	3R	3R	2R	1R	0 / 7	5–7	42%
Miami Open	A	A	A	A	1R	2R	3R	Q2	NH	A	3R	3R	3R	2R	1R	0 / 8	7–8	47%
Madrid Open	A	A	A	A	A	A	Q1	A	NH	A	1R	2R	QF	3R	1R	0 / 5	4–5	44%
Italian Open	A	A	A	A	A	A	A	A	A	A	A	QF	3R	2R	1R	0 / 4	4–4	50%
Canadian Open	A	A	A	A	A	A	A	A	NH	A	F	2R	2R	2R		0 / 4	7–4	64%
Cincinnati Open	A	A	A	A	A	2R	A	A	A	A	1R	1R	1R	2R		0 / 5	1–5	17%
Guadalajara Open	NH										1R	A	NTI			0 / 1	0–1	0%
China Open	A	A	A	A	A	Q1	A	A	NH			1R	3R	A		0 / 2	1–2	33%
Pan Pacific / Wuhan Open (Note: In 2014, the Pan Pacific Open was downgraded to a Premier event and replaced by the Wuhan Open.)	A	A	A	A	A	A	A	A	NH				3R	A		0 / 1	2–1	67%
Win–loss	0–0	0–0	0–0	0–0	0–1	2–2	2–2	0–0	0–0	2–1	8–7	6–8	10–8	1–8	0–5	0 / 41	31–41	43%
Career statistics
	2012	2013	2014	2015	2016	2017	2018	2019	2020	2021	2022	2023	2024	2025	2026	SR	W–L	Win %
Tournaments	0 (Note: During the season, she did not play in the main-draw of any WTA Tour-level tournaments. However, she played at the Billie Jean King Cup, which is not counted as a played tournament but as matches counted.)	1	2	2	3	11	9	5	0	2	23	22	23	22	9	Career total: 132		
Titles	0	0	0	0	0	0	0	0	0	0	2	1	1	0	0	Career total: 4		
Finals	0	0	0	0	0	1	0	0	0	0	3	1	2	0	0	Career total: 7		
Hard win–loss	0–0	1–1	0–1	2–1	2–3	8–6	5–7	3–3	0–0	2–2	21–16	20–14	24–15	8–17	0–7	2 / 84	96–89	52%
Clay win–loss	1–1	0–0	0–1	3–2	0–1	2–3	3–3	5–5	0–0	0–0	4–3	11–5	7–6	4–5	0–2	0 / 37	40–37	52%
Grass win–loss	0–0	0–0	0–0	0–0	0–0	1–2	0–0	1–1	0–0	0–0	12–2	4–3	3–3	4–4	0–0	2 / 17	25–15	63%
Overall win–loss	1–1	1–1	0–2	5–3	2–4	11–11	8–10	9–9	0–0	2–2	37–21	35–22	34–24	16–26	0–9	4 / 133	161–144	53%
Win %	50%	50%	0%	63%	33%	50%	44%	50%	–	50%	64%	61%	59%	38%	0%	Career total: 53%		
Year-end ranking (Note: 2011: WTA ranking–746.)	582	288	335	198	211	65	184	120	358	82	15	11	17	58		$9,285,468		

=== Doubles ===
Current through the 2025 WTA Tour.

Tournament	2012	2013	2014	2015	2016	2017	2018	2019	2020	2021	2022	2023	2024	2025	SR	W–L	Win %
Grand Slam tournaments
Australian Open	A	A	A	A	A	A	3R	A	A	A	F	2R	3R	3R	0 / 5	12–5	71%
French Open	A	A	A	A	A	A	A	A	A	A	2R	2R	A	3R	0 / 3	4–3	57%
Wimbledon	A	A	A	A	A	3R	A	A	A	A	3R	2R (Note: Withdrawal during the tournament not counted as a loss.)	1R	3R	0 / 5	7–3	70%
US Open	A	A	A	A	A	1R	A	A	A	A	3R	QF	3R	2R	0 / 5	8–5	62%
Win–loss	0–0	0–0	0–0	0–0	0–0	2–2	2–1	0–0	0–0	0–0	10–4	6–3	4–3	7-3	0 / 18	31–16	66%
Year-end championships
WTA Finals	DNQ										RR	DNQ			0 / 1	1–2	33%
WTA Elite Trophy	DNQ								NH			W			1 / 1	3–0	100%
National representation
Summer Olympics	A	NH			A	NH				A	NH		2R	NH	1 / 1	1–1	50%
Billie Jean King Cup	Z1	A	A	PO	Z1	A	PO	PO	A	A	PO	QR	QR	QR	0 / 0	10–2	83%
WTA 1000 tournaments
Qatar Open	A	A	A	NTI	A	NTI	A	NTI	A	NTI	2R	NTI	A		0 / 1	1–1	50%
Dubai Championships	NTI			A	NTI	A	NTI	A	NTI	A	NTI	1R	A		0 / 1	0–1	0%
Indian Wells Open	A	A	A	A	A	A	A	A	A	A	1R	F	QF		0 / 3	5–3	63%
Miami Open	A	A	A	A	A	A	A	A	A	A	1R	2R	1R		0 / 3	1–3	25%
Madrid Open	A	A	A	A	A	A	A	A	A	A	1R	W	1R		1 / 3	4–2	67%
Italian Open	A	A	A	A	A	A	A	A	A	A	A	2R	A		0 / 1	1–0	100%
Canadian Open	A	A	A	A	A	A	A	A	A	A	2R	A	A		0 / 1	1–1	50%
Cincinnati Open	A	A	A	A	A	A	A	A	A	A	QF	1R	A		0 / 2	2–2	50%
Guadalajara Open	NH										F	A	NTI		0 / 1	4–1	80%
China Open	A	A	A	A	A	A	A	A	NH			QF	QF		0 / 2	4–2	67%
Pan Pacific / Wuhan Open	A	A	A	A	A	A	A	A	NH				1R		0 / 1	0–1	0%
Win–loss	0–0	0–0	0–0	0–0	0–0	0–0	0–0	0–0	0–0	0–0	8–7	9–3	4–5		1 / 19	21–15	58%
Career statistics
	2012	2013	2014	2015	2016	2017	2018	2019	2020	2021	2022	2023	2024	2025	SR	W–L	Win %
Tournaments	0	1	2	2	1	4	3	1	0	0	19	14	2		Career total: 48		
Titles	0	0	0	1	0	1	0	0	0	0	2	2	1		Career total: 7		
Finals	0	0	0	1	0	1	0	0	0	0	4	3	1		Career total: 10		
Hard win–loss	0–0	1–1	0–1	1–1	0–0	1–2	2–3	0–0	0–0	0–0	23–12	12–9	5–1		3 / 32	45–30	60%
Clay win–loss	0–0	0–0	0–1	6–0	2–2	4–0	2–0	4–1	0–0	0–0	3–3	6–1	0–0		3 / 12	27–8	77%
Grass win–loss	0–0	0–0	0–0	0–0	0–0	2–1	0–0	0–0	0–0	0–0	6–2	1–0	0–0		1 / 5	9–3	75%
Overall win–loss	0–0	1–1	0–2	7–1	2–2	7–3	4–3	4–1	0–0	0–0	32–17	19–10	5–1		7 / 49	81–41	66%
Win %	–	50%	0%	88%	50%	70%	57%	80%	–	–	65%	66%	83%		Career total: 66%		
Year-end ranking		361	349	121	477	106	244	271	588	481	13	24					

== Grand Slam tournament finals ==
=== Doubles: 1 (runner-up) ===
Result	Year	Tournament	Surface	Partner	Opponents	Score
Loss	2022	Australian Open	Hard	(Kazakhstan) Anna Danilina	(Czech Republic) Barbora Krejčíková (Czech Republic) Kateřina Siniaková	7–6^{(7–3)}, 4–6, 4–6

== Other significant finals ==
=== WTA 1000 tournaments ===
==== Singles: 1 (runner-up) ====
Result	Year	Tournament	Surface	Opponent	Score
Loss	2022	Canadian Open	Hard	(Romania) Simona Halep	3–6, 6–2, 3–6

==== Doubles: 3 (1 title, 2 runner-ups) ====
Result	Year	Tournament	Surface	Partner	Opponents	Score
Loss	2022	Guadalajara Open	Hard	(Kazakhstan) Anna Danilina	(Australia) Storm Sanders (Brazil) Luisa Stefani	6–7^{(4–7)}, 7–6^{(7–2)}, [8–10]
Loss	2023	Indian Wells Open	Hard	(Germany) Laura Siegemund	(Czech Republic) Barbora Krejčíková (Czech Republic) Kateřina Siniaková	1–6, 7–6^{(7–3)}, [7–10]
Win	2023	Madrid Open	Clay	Victoria Azarenka	(United States) Coco Gauff (United States) Jessica Pegula	6–1, 6–4

=== WTA Elite Trophy ===
==== Singles: 1 (title) ====
Result	Year	Location	Surface	Opponent	Score
Win	2023	WTA Elite Trophy, China	Hard (i)	(China) Zheng Qinwen	7–6^{(13–11)}, 7–6^{(7–4)}

==== Doubles: 1 (title) ====
Result	Year	Location	Surface	Partner	Opponents	Score
Win	2023	WTA Elite Trophy, China	Hard (i)	Veronika Kudermetova	(Japan) Miyu Kato (Indonesia) Aldila Sutjiadi	6–3, 6–3

== WTA Tour finals ==
=== Singles: 7 (4 titles, 3 runner-ups) ===
Legend WTA Elite Trophy (1–0) WTA 1000 (0–1) WTA 500 (1–0) WTA 250 (Note: The WTA International tournaments were reclassified as WTA 250 tournaments in 2021.) (2–2)	Finals by surface Hard (2–3) Grass (2–0)	Finals by setting Outdoor (3–3) Indoor (1–0)

Result	W–L	Date	Tournament	Tier	Surface	Opponent	Score
Loss	0–1	Sep 2017	Korea Open, South Korea	International	Hard	(Latvia) Jeļena Ostapenko	7–6^{(7–5)}, 1–6, 4–6
Win	1–1	Jun 2022	Nottingham Open, UK	WTA 250	Grass	(United States) Alison Riske	6–4, 1–6, 6–3
Win	2–1	Jun 2022	Birmingham Classic, UK	WTA 250	Grass	(China) Zhang Shuai	5–4 ret.
Loss	2–2	Aug 2022	Canadian Open, Canada	WTA 1000	Hard	(Romania) Simona Halep	3–6, 6–2, 3–6
Win	3–2	Oct 2023	WTA Elite Trophy, China	Elite	Hard (i)	(China) Zheng Qinwen	7–6^{(13–11)}, 7–6^{(7–4)}
Loss	3–3	Aug 2024	Tennis in Cleveland, US	WTA 250	Hard	(United States) McCartney Kessler	6–1, 1–6, 5–7
Win	4–3	Sep 2024	Korea Open, South Korea	WTA 500	Hard	Daria Kasatkina	1–6, 6–4, 6–1

=== Doubles: 12 (8 titles, 4 runner-ups) ===
Legend Grand Slam (0–1) WTA Elite Trophy (1–0) WTA 1000 (1–2) WTA 500 (2–1) WTA 250* (4–0)	Finals by surface Hard (3–4) Clay (3–0) Grass (2–0)	Finals by setting Outdoor (7–4) Indoor (1–0)

Result	W–L	Date	Tournament	Tier	Surface	Partner	Opponents	Score
Win	1–0	Apr 2015	Copa Colsanitas, Colombia	International*	Clay	(Brazil) Paula Cristina Gonçalves	(United States) Irina Falconi (United States) Shelby Rogers	6–3, 3–6, [10–6]
Win	2–0	Apr 2017	Copa Colsanitas, Colombia (2)	International	Clay	(Argentina) Nadia Podoroska	(Paraguay) Verónica Cepede Royg (Poland) Magda Linette	6–3, 7–6^{(7–4)}
Win	3–0	Jan 2022	Sydney International, Australia	WTA 500	Hard	(Kazakhstan) Anna Danilina	(Germany) Vivian Heisen (Hungary) Panna Udvardy	4–6, 7–5, [10–8]
Loss	3–1	Jan 2022	Australian Open, Australia	Grand Slam	Hard	(Kazakhstan) Anna Danilina	(Czech Republic) Barbora Krejčíková (Czech Republic) Kateřina Siniaková	7–6^{(7–3)}, 4–6, 4–6
Win	4–1	Jun 2022	Nottingham Open, UK	WTA 250	Grass	(China) Zhang Shuai	(United States) Caroline Dolehide (Romania) Monica Niculescu	7–6^{(7–2)}, 6–3
Loss	4–2	Oct 2022	Guadalajara Open, Mexico	WTA 1000	Hard	(Kazakhstan) Anna Danilina	(Australia) Storm Sanders (Brazil) Luisa Stefani	6–7^{(4–7)}, 7–6^{(7–2)}, [8–10]
Loss	4–3	Mar 2023	Indian Wells Open, US	WTA 1000	Hard	(Germany) Laura Siegemund	(Czech Republic) Barbora Krejčíková (Czech Republic) Kateřina Siniaková	1–6, 7–6^{(7–3)}, [7–10]
Win	5–3	May 2023	Madrid Open, Spain	WTA 1000	Clay	Victoria Azarenka	(United States) Coco Gauff (United States) Jessica Pegula	6–1, 6–4
Win	6–3	Oct 2023	WTA Elite Trophy, China	Elite	Hard (i)	Veronika Kudermetova	(Japan) Miyu Kato (Indonesia) Aldila Sutjiadi	6–3, 6–3
Win	7–3	Jan 2024	Adelaide International, Australia	WTA 500	Hard	(United States) Taylor Townsend	(France) Caroline Garcia (France) Kristina Mladenovic	7–5, 6–3
Loss	7–4	Jan 2025	Adelaide International, Australia	WTA 500	Hard	(Germany) Laura Siegemund	(China) Guo Hanyu; Alexandra Panova	5–7, 4–6
Win	8–4	Jun 2025	Nottingham Open, UK (2)	WTA 250	Grass	(Germany) Laura Siegemund	(Kazakhstan) Anna Danilina (Japan) Ena Shibahara	6–3, 6–2

== WTA 125 finals ==
=== Singles: 2 (1 title, 1 runner-up) ===
Result	W–L	Date	Tournament	Surface	Opponent	Score
Win	1–0	May 2022	Open de Saint-Malo, France	Clay	Anna Blinkova	7–6^{(7–3)}, 6–3
Loss	1–1	May 2022	Clarins Open Paris, France	Clay	(United States) Claire Liu	3–6, 4–6

=== Doubles: 1 (title) ===
Result	W–L	Date	Tournament	Surface	Partner	Opponents	Score
Win	1–0	May 2022	Clarins Open, France	Clay	(France) Kristina Mladenovic	(Georgia (country)) Oksana Kalashnikova (Japan) Miyu Kato	5–7, 6–4, [10–4]

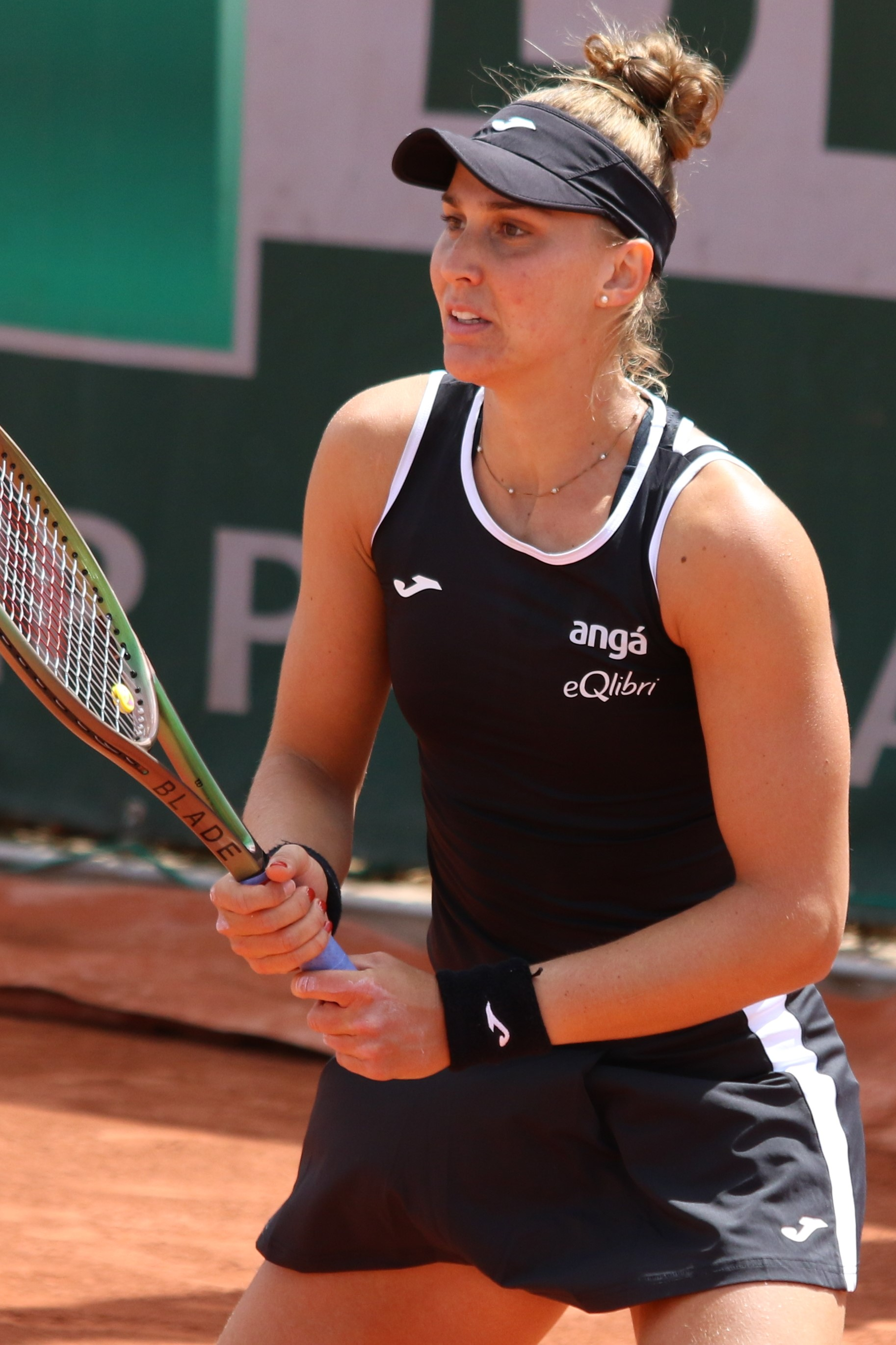
Haddad Maia at the 2022 French Open.

== ITF Circuit finals ==
=== Singles: 25 (17 titles, 8 runner-ups) ===
Legend $100,000 tournaments (1–0) $80,000 tournaments (0–1) $50/60,000 tournaments (4–0) $25,000 tournaments (5–5) $10/15,000 tournaments (7–2)	Finals by surface Hard (10–3) Clay (7–5)

Result	W–L	Date	Tournament	Tier	Surface	Opponent	Score
Loss	0–1	Aug 2011	ITF São Paulo, Brazil	10,000	Clay	(Brazil) Maria Fernanda Alves	6–4, 5–7, 3–6
Win	1–1	Oct 2011	ITF Goiânia, Brazil	10,000	Clay	(Portugal) Bárbara Luz	6–2, 6–0
Win	2–1	Apr 2012	ITF Ribeirão Preto, Brazil	10,000	Hard	(South Africa) Natasha Fourouclas	6–0, 6–1
Win	3–1	Mar 2013	ITF Ribeirão Preto, Brazil	10,000	Clay	(Argentina) Andrea Benítez	7–6^{(7–2)}, 6–2
Win	4–1	Apr 2013	ITF Antalya, Turkey	10,000	Hard	(Czech Republic) Tereza Martincová	6–4, 6–3
Loss	4–2	May 2013	ITF Caserta, Italy	25,000	Clay	(Czech Republic) Renata Voráčová	4–6, 1–6
Loss	4–3	Jun 2013	ITF Lenzerheide, Switzerland	25,000	Clay	(Germany) Laura Siegemund	2–6, 3–6
Loss	4–4	Jun 2014	ITF Breda, Netherlands	15,000	Clay	(United States) Bernarda Pera	1–6, 6–7^{(8–10)}
Loss	4–5	Dec 2014	ITF Mérida, Mexico	25,000	Hard	(Romania) Patricia Maria Țig	6–3, 3–6, 1–6
Loss	4–6	Oct 2016	ITF Pula, Italy	25,000	Clay	(Italy) Martina Trevisan	3–6, 4–6
Win	5–6	Oct 2016	Scottsdale Challenge, United States	50,000	Hard	(United States) Kristie Ahn	7–6^{(7–4)}, 7–6^{(7–2)}
Win	6–6	Nov 2016	Waco Showdown, United States	50,000	Hard	(United States) Grace Min	6–2, 3–6, 6–1
Win	7–6	Feb 2017	ITF Clare, Australia	25,000	Hard	(Czech Republic) Markéta Vondroušová	6–2, 6–2
Win	8–6	May 2017	Open de Cagnes-sur-Mer, France	100,000	Clay	(Switzerland) Jil Teichmann	6–3, 6–3
Loss	8–7	Nov 2018	Tyler Pro Challenge, United States	80,000	Hard	(United States) Whitney Osuigwe	3–6, 4–6
Win	9–7	Sep 2020	ITF Montemor-o-Novo, Portugal	W25	Hard	(United Kingdom) Jodie Burrage	6–1, 6–4
Loss	9–8	Sep 2020	ITF Figueira da Foz, Portugal	W25	Hard	(Spain) Georgina García Pérez	7–6^{(12–10)}, 5–7, 4–6
Win	10–8	Sep 2020	ITF Santarém, Portugal	W15	Hard	(Poland) Martyna Kubka	6–0, 6–0
Win	11–8	Sep 2020	ITF Porto, Portugal	W15	Hard	(Brazil) Ingrid Martins	6–3, 6–2
Win	12–8	Oct 2020	ITF Funchal, Portugal	W15	Hard	(Portugal) Francisca Jorge	6–3, 6–3
Win	13–8	Apr 2021	ITF Villa Maria, Argentina	W25	Clay	(United Kingdom) Francesca Jones	5–7, 6–4, 6–2
Win	14–8	Apr 2021	ITF Córdoba, Argentina	25,000	Clay	(Hungary) Panna Udvardy	6–2, 6–2
Win	15–8	June 2021	ITF Montemor-o-Novo, Portugal	W25	Hard	(Georgia (country)) Mariam Bolkvadze	6–4, 6–4
Win	16–8	Sep 2021	Collonge-Bellerive Open, Switzerland	W60	Clay	(Turkey) İpek Öz	5–7, 6–1, 6–4
Win	17–8	Sep 2021	Montreux Ladies Open, Switzerland	W60	Clay	(United Kingdom) Francesca Jones	6–4, 6–3

=== Doubles: 15 (9 titles, 6 runner-ups) ===
Legend $100,000 tournaments (1–0) $80,000 tournaments (0–1) $50,000 tournaments (0–1) $25,000 tournaments (4–1) $10/15,000 tournaments (4–3)	Finals by surface Hard (3–2) Clay (5–4) Grass (1–0)

Result	W–L	Date	Tournament	Tier	Surface	Partner	Opponents	Score
Win	1–0	Sep 2010	ITF Mogi das Cruzes, Brazil	10,000	Clay	(Brazil) Flávia Guimarães Bueno	(Brazil) Maria Fernanda Alves (Brazil) Natasha Lotuffo	6–1, 6–3
Win	2–0	Aug 2011	ITF São Paulo, Brazil	10,000	Clay	(Brazil) Carla Forte	(Paraguay) Isabella Robbiani (India) Kyra Shroff	6–7^{(5)}, 6–3, [10–7]
Win	3–0	Oct 2011	ITF Goiânia, Brazil	10,000	Clay	(Brazil) Paula Cristina Gonçalves	(Brazil) Flávia Dechandt Araújo (Brazil) Karina Venditti	6–4, 5–7, [12–10]
Loss	3–1	Apr 2013	ITF Antalya, Turkey	10,000	Hard	(Portugal) Bárbara Luz	(Romania) Irina Bara (Romania) Diana Buzean	5–7, 1–6
Loss	3–2	Jun 2014	ITF Amstelveen, Netherlands	10,000	Clay	(Argentina) Tatiana Búa	(United States) Bernarda Pera (Bulgaria) Viktoriya Tomova	0–6, 1–2 ret.
Win	4–2	Jun 2014	ITF Alkmaar, Netherlands	10,000	Clay	(United States) Bernarda Pera	(Netherlands) Charlotte van der Meij (Netherlands) Mandy Wagemaker	6–1, 1–6, [10–5]
Loss	4–3	Jan 2015	ITF Sunrise, United States	25,000	Clay	(Brazil) Paula Cristina Gonçalves	(Russia) Anna Kalinskaya (United States) Katerina Stewart	6–7^{(6)}, 7–5, [6–10]
Loss	4–4	May 2015	Open Saint-Gaudens, France	50,000+H	Clay	(United States) Nicole Melichar	(Colombia) Mariana Duque Marino (Israel) Julia Glushko	6–1, 6–7^{(5)}, [4–10]
Win	5–4	May 2015	Grado Tennis Cup, Italy	25,000	Clay	(Switzerland) Viktorija Golubic	(Canada) Sharon Fichman (Poland) Katarzyna Piter	6–3, 6–2
Win	6–4	Jan 2016	ITF Guarujá, Brazil	25,000	Hard	(Brazil) Paula Cristina Gonçalves	(Brazil) Laura Pigossi (Switzerland) Jil Teichmann	6–7^{(3)}, 7–5, [10–7]
Win	7–4	Feb 2017	ITF Clare, Australia	25,000	Hard	(Australia) Genevieve Lorbergs	(Australia) Alison Bai (Japan) Erika Sema	6–4, 6–3
Loss	7–5	May 2019	Open de Cagnes-sur-Mer, France	W80	Clay	(Brazil) Luisa Stefani	(Switzerland) Xenia Knoll (Russia) Anna Blinkova	6–4, 2–6, [12–14]
Win	8–5	Jun 2019	Ilkley Trophy, United Kingdom	W100	Grass	(Brazil) Luisa Stefani	(Australia) Ellen Perez (Australia) Arina Rodionova	6–4, 6–7^{(5)}, [10–4]
Win	9–5	Sep 2020	ITF Figueira da Foz, Portugal	W25	Hard	(Brazil) Ingrid Martins	(Sweden) Jacqueline Cabaj Awad (Portugal) Inês Murta	7–5, 6–1
Loss	9–6	Oct 2020	ITF Funchal, Portugal	W15	Hard	(Brazil) Ingrid Martins	(Netherlands) Arianne Hartono (Netherlands) Eva Vedder	6–4, 1–6, [7–10]

== Junior Grand Slam finals ==
=== Doubles: 2 (2 runner-ups) ===
Result	Year	Tournament	Surface	Partner	Opponents	Score
Loss	2012	French Open	Clay	(Paraguay) Montserrat González	(Russia) Daria Gavrilova (Russia) Irina Khromacheva	6–4, 4–6, [8–10]
Loss	2013	French Open	Clay	(Ecuador) Doménica González	(Czech Republic) Barbora Krejčíková (Czech Republic) Kateřina Siniaková	5–7, 2–6

== Career earnings ==
Current through the 2025 Australian Open.

Year	Grand Slam titles (Note: Includes singles, doubles and mixed doubles titles.)	WTA titles	Total titles	Earnings ($)	Money list rank
2014	0	0	0	16,480	355
2015	0	1	1	44,732	250
2016	0	0	0	51,268	245
2017	0	1	1	301,172	118
2018	0	0	0	196,947	162
2019	0	0	0	218,671	152
2020	0	0	0	15,483	367
2021	0	0	0	223,747	160
2022	0	4	4	1,275,623	26
2023	0	3	3	2,858,821	8
2024	0	1	1	2,000,770	16
2025	0	0	0	256,690	6
Career	0	11	11	7,608,022	103

== Career Grand Slam statistics ==
=== Seedings ===
The tournaments won by Haddad Maia are in boldface, and advanced into finals by Haddad Maia are in italics.

Year	Australian Open	French Open	Wimbledon	US Open
2015	absent	did not qualify	did not qualify	absent
2016	absent	did not qualify	absent	did not qualify
2017	absent	qualifier	not seeded	not seeded
2018	not seeded	absent	absent	did not qualify
2019	qualifier	did not qualify	qualifier	absent
2020	absent	absent	cancelled	absent
2021	absent	absent	did not qualify	did not qualify
2022	not seeded	not seeded	23rd	15th
2023	14th	14th	13th	19th
2024	10th	13th	20th	22nd
2025	15th			

=== Best Grand Slam results details ===
Grand Slam winners are in boldface, and runner-ups are in italics.

Australian Open
2024 Australian Open (10th seed)
Round	Opponent	Rank	Score
1R	(Czech Republic) Linda Fruhvirtová	84	6–2, 3–6, 6–2
2R	Alina Korneeva (Q)	179	6–1, 6–2
3R	Maria Timofeeva (Q)	170	6–7^{(7–9)}, 3–6

Wimbledon Championships
2023 Wimbledon Championships (13th seed)
Round	Opponent	Rank	Score
1R	(Kazakhstan) Yulia Putintseva	56	3–6, 6–0, 6–4
2R	(Romania) Jaqueline Cristian (PR)	133	4–6, 6–2, 6–4
3R	(Romania) Sorana Cîrstea	37	6–4, 6–4
4R	(Kazakhstan) Elena Rybakina (3)	3	1–4 ret.

French Open
2023 French Open (14th seed)
Round	Opponent	Rank	Score
1R	(Germany) Tatjana Maria	67	6–0, 6–1
2R	Diana Shnaider	108	6–2, 5–7, 6–4
3R	Ekaterina Alexandrova (23)	23	5–7, 6–4, 7–5
4R	(Spain) Sara Sorribes Tormo (PR)	132	6–7^{(3–7)}, 6–3, 7–5
QF	(Tunisia) Ons Jabeur (7)	**7**	3–6, 7–6^{(7–5)}, 6–1
SF	(Poland) **Iga Świątek (1)**	**1**	2–6, 6–7^{(7–9)}

US Open
2024 US Open (22nd seed)
Round	Opponent	Rank	Score
1R	(Armenia) Elina Avanesyan	51	4–6, 6–0, 6–2
2R	(Spain) Sara Sorribes Tormo	115	6–2, 6–1
3R	Anna Kalinskaya (15)	15	6–3, 6–1
4R	(Denmark) Caroline Wozniacki	71	6–2. 3–6, 6–3
QF	(Czech Republic) Karolína Muchová	52	1–6, 4–6

== Head-to-head records ==
=== Wins against top 10 players ===
- Haddad Maia's match record against players who were, at the time the match was played, ranked in the top 10.

#	Player	Rk	Event	Surface	Rd	Score	Rk	Ref
2019
1.	(United States) Sloane Stephens	4	Mexican Open, Mexico	Hard	2R	6–3, 6–3	172	
2021
2.	(Czech Republic) Karolína Plíšková	3	Indian Wells Open, US	Hard	3R	6–3, 7–5	115	
2022
3.	(Greece) Maria Sakkari	3	Miami Open, United States	Hard	2R	4–6, 6–1, 6–2	62	
4.	(Greece) Maria Sakkari	5	Nottingham Open, UK	Grass	QF	6–4, 4–6, 6–3	48	
5.	(Poland) Iga Świątek	1	Canadian Open, Canada	Hard	3R	6–4, 3–6, 7–5	24	
2023
6.	(Kazakhstan) Elena Rybakina	10	Abu Dhabi Open, UAE	Hard	QF	3–6, 6–3, 6–2	14	
7.	Daria Kasatkina	8	Qatar Open, Qatar	Hard	2R	6–3, 7–6^{(9–7)}	12	
8.	(Kazakhstan) Elena Rybakina	7	Stuttgart Open, Germany	Clay (i)	2R	6–1, 3–1, ret.	14	
9.	(Tunisia) Ons Jabeur	7	French Open, France	Clay	QF	3–6, 7–6^{(7–5)}, 6–1	14	
2024
10.	(Tunisia) Ons Jabeur	6	Abu Dhabi Open, UAE	Hard	QF	6–3, 6–4	13	
11.	(Greece) Maria Sakkari	6	Madrid Open, Spain	Clay	4R	6–4, 6–4	14	
2025
12.	(United States) Emma Navarro	9	Internationaux de Strasbourg, France	Clay	QF	3–6, 7–6^{(7–3)}, 6–2	23	

- Key: (Rk) first use, opponent rank; (Rd) round; (Rk) 2nd use, player rank; (Ref) reference; (F) final; (SF) semifinal; (QF) quarterfinal; (#R) rounds 4, 3, 2, 1; (RR) round-robin stage; (Q#) qualifying rounds or stages (3), 2, 1.

=== Double bagel matches ===
Result	W–L	Year	Tournament	Tier	Surface	Opponent	Rank	Rd
Win	1–0	2011	ITF Goiana, Brazil	10,000	Clay	(Brazil) Isabella Capato Camargo	–	2R
Win	2–0	2012	ITF São José do Rio Preto, Brazil	25,000	Clay	(Brazil) Marina Danzini	1089	1R
Win	3–0	2013	ITF Antalya, Turkey	10,000	Hard	(Russia) Vitaliya Nekhoroshikh	–	1R
Win	4–0	2014	Royal Cup, Montenegro	25,000	Clay	(Czech Republic) Jana Kůlová	–	Q1
Win	5–0	2019	Open de Cagnes-sur-Mer, France	80,000	Clay	(France) Julie Gervais	392	1R
Win	6–0	2020	ITF Figueira da Foz, Portugal	25,000	Hard	(Spain) Andrea Lázaro García	318	SF
Win	7–0	2020	ITF Santarém, Portugal	15,000	Hard	(Poland) Martyna Kubka	852	F
Win	8–0	2020	ITF Porto, Portugal	15,000	Hard	(Spain) Noelia Bouzo Zanotti	843	1R
Win	9–0	2021	ITF Potchefstroom, South Africa	25,000	Hard	(South Africa) Tanika Panaino	–	Q1
Win	10–0	2021	ITF Montemor, Portugal	25,000	Hard	(Portugal) Matilde Jorge	1354	1R
Win	11–0	2022	US Open, United States	Grand Slam	Hard	(Croatia) Ana Konjuh	117	1R

== Longest winning streak ==
=== 12 matches (2022) ===
#	Tournament	Category	Start date	Surface	Rd	Opponent	Rank	Score
–	French Open	Grand Slam	22 May 2022	Clay	2R	(Estonia) Kaia Kanepi	46	4–6, 4–6
1	Nottingham Open	WTA 250	6 June 2022	Grass	1R	(China) Wang Qiang	146	5–7, 6–4, 6–3
2	Nottingham Open	WTA 250	6 June 2022	Grass	2R	(United Kingdom) Yuriko Miyazaki (Q)	234	6–2, 7–6^{(4)}
3	Nottingham Open	WTA 250	6 June 2022	Grass	QF	(Greece) Maria Sakkari (1)	5	6–4, 4–6, 6–3
4	Nottingham Open	WTA 250	6 June 2022	Grass	SF	(Czech Republic) Tereza Martincová	60	6–3, 4–1 ret.
5	Nottingham Open	WTA 250	6 June 2022	Grass	W	(United States) Alison Riske (6)	40	6–4, 1–6, 6–3
6	Birmingham Classic	WTA 250	13 June 2022	Grass	1R	(Czech Republic) Petra Kvitová (5/WC)	31	7–6^{(4)}, 6–2
7	Birmingham Classic	WTA 250	13 June 2022	Grass	2R	(Poland) Magdalena Fręch	91	6–1, 5–7, 7–6^{(3)}
8	Birmingham Classic	WTA 250	13 June 2022	Grass	QF	(Italy) Camila Giorgi (3)	26	6–3, 6–2
9	Birmingham Classic	WTA 250	13 June 2022	Grass	SF	(Romania) Simona Halep (2)	20	6–3, 2–6, 6–4
10	Birmingham Classic	WTA 250	13 June 2022	Grass	W	(China) Zhang Shuai (8)	54	5–4 ret.
11	Eastbourne International	WTA 500	20 June 2022	Grass	2R	(Estonia) Kaia Kanepi	39	6–4, 3–6, 6–3
12	Eastbourne International	WTA 500	20 June 2022	Grass	3R	(United Kingdom) Jodie Burrage (WC)	169	6–1, 6–2
–	Eastbourne International	WTA 500	20 June 2022	Grass	QF	(Ukraine) Lesia Tsurenko (Q)	114	walkover
–	Eastbourne International	WTA 500	20 June 2022	Grass	SF	(Czech Republic) Petra Kvitová (14)	31	6–7^{(5)}, 4–6
