= 2018 Fed Cup Asia/Oceania Zone Group I =

International tennis competition

The Fed Cup Asia/Oceania Zone Group I is the first stage of the Zonal Groups from the Asia/Oceania to determine who will advance to the World Group I – Play-offs involving teams from Asia and Oceania, and who will be relegated to the World Group II Play-offs.

== Participating teams ==
- Kazakhstan
- Chinese Taipei
- Japan
- Thailand
- India
- China
- Hong Kong
- South Korea

== Pools ==
	Pool A	KAZ	CHN	IND	HKG
1	Kazakhstan (3–0)		3–0	2–1	3–0
2	China (2–1)	0–3		2–1	2–1
3	India (1–2)	1–2	1–2		3–0
4	Hong Kong (0–3)	0–3	1–2	0–3	

	Pool B	JPN	KOR	THA	TPE
1	Japan (3–0)		3–0	3–0	3–0
2	South Korea (2–1)	0–3		2–1	3–0
3	Thailand (1–2)	0–3	1–2		2–1
4	Chinese Taipei (0–3)	0–3	0–3	1–2	

== Pool A ==
=== Kazakhstan vs. Hong Kong ===
Kazakhstan
3
New Delhi, India
7 February
Hard

Hong Kong
0

			1	2	3
1	(Kazakhstan) (Hong Kong)	Zarina Diyas; Ho-Ching Wu	6; 3	6; 1
2	(Kazakhstan) (Hong Kong)	Yulia Putintseva; Kwan Yau Ng	6; 1	6; 0
3	(Kazakhstan) (Hong Kong)	Zarina Diyas / Yulia Putintseva; Eudice Chong / Ling Zhang	6; 1	6; 3

=== China vs. India ===
China
2
New Delhi, India
7 February
Hard

India
1

			1	2	3
1	(China) (India)	Yafan Wang; Karman Kaur Thandi	6; 2	6; 2
2	(China) (India)	Lin Zhu; Ankita Raina	3; 6	2; 6
3	(China) (India)	Yafan Wang / Zhaoxuan Yang; Ankita Raina / Prarthana Thombare	6; 1	7^{7} 6^{1}

=== Kazakhstan vs. India ===
Kazakhstan
2
New Delhi, India
8 February
Hard

India
1

			1	2	3
1	(Kazakhstan) (India)	Zarina Diyas; Karman Kaur Thandi	6; 3	6; 2
2	(Kazakhstan) (India)	Yulia Putintseva; Ankita Raina	3; 6	6; 1	4; 6
3	(Kazakhstan) (India)	Zarina Diyas / Yulia Putintseva; Ankita Raina / Prarthana Thombare	6; 0	6; 4

=== China vs. Hong Kong ===
China
2
New Delhi, India
8 February
Hard

Hong Kong
1

			1	2	3
1	(China) (Hong Kong)	Yafan Wang; Eudice Chong	6; 3	6; 2
2	(China) (Hong Kong)	Lin Zhu; Ling Zhang	3; 6	4; 6
3	(China) (Hong Kong)	Yafan Wang / Zhaoxuan Yang; Eudice Chong / Ling Zhang	6; 1	6; 0

=== China vs. Kazakhstan ===
China
0
New Delhi, India
9 February
Hard

Kazakhstan
3

			1	2	3
1	(China) (Kazakhstan)	Zhaoxuan Yang; Zarina Diyas	5; 7	2; 6
2	(China) (Kazakhstan)	Lin Zhu; Yulia Putintseva	4; 6	6; 4	1; 6
3	(China) (Kazakhstan)	Yafan Wang / Zhaoxuan Yang; Gozal Ainitdinova / Zhibek Kulambayeva	0; 6	0; 6

=== India vs. Hong Kong ===
India
3
New Delhi, India
9 February
Hard

Hong Kong
0

			1	2	3
1	(India) (Hong Kong)	Karman Kaur Thandi; Eudice Chong	6; 3	6; 4
2	(India) (Hong Kong)	Ankita Raina; Ling Zhang	6; 3	6; 2
3	(India) (Hong Kong)	Prarthana Thombare / Pranjala Yadlapalli; Kwan Yau Ng / Ho-Ching Wu	6; 2	6; 4

== Pool B ==
=== Japan vs. Thailand ===
Japan
3
New Delhi, India
February 06, 2018
Hard

Thailand
0

			1	2	3
1	(Japan) (Thailand)	Kurumi Nara; Peangtarn Plipuech	6; 0	6; 2
2	(Japan) (Thailand)	Nao Hibino; Luksika Kumkhum	5; 7	7^{7} 6^{5}	6; 0
3	(Japan) (Thailand)	Miyu Kato / Makoto Ninomiya; Nicha Lertpitaksinchai / Peangtarn Plipuech	6; 3	6; 3

=== Chinese Taipei vs. South Korea ===
Chinese Taipei
0
New Delhi, India
February 06, 2018
Hard

South Korea
3

			1	2	3
1	(Chinese Taipei) (South Korea)	Lin, Ya-Hsuan; Jeong, Sunam	3; 6	3; 6
2	(Chinese Taipei) (South Korea)	Hsu, Chieh-Yu; Ham, Na-Lae	2; 6	3; 6
3	(Chinese Taipei) (South Korea)	Hsu, Ching-Wen / Lee, Pei-Chi; Kim, Na-Ri / Lee, So-Ra	2; 6	3; 6

=== Japan vs. South Korea ===
Japan
3
New Delhi, India
February 07, 2018
Hard

South Korea
0

			1	2	3
1	(Japan) (South Korea)	Nara, Kurumi; Jeong, Sunam	6; 3	6; 0
2	(Japan) (South Korea)	Hibino, Nao; Han, Na-Lae	1; 6	7^{7} 6^{2}	6; 2
3	(Japan) (South Korea)	Kato, Miyu / Ninomiya, Makoto; Kim, Na-Ri / Lee, So-Ra	6; 2	6; 2

=== Chinese Taipei vs. Thailand ===
Chinese Taipei
1
New Delhi, India
February 07, 2018
Hard

Thailand
2

			1	2	3
1	(Chinese Taipei) (Thailand)	Lee, Pei-Chi; Cheapchandej, Patcharin	4; 6	6; 4	6; 3
2	(Chinese Taipei) (Thailand)	Hsu, Chieh-Yu; Kumkhum, Luksika	0; 6	1; 6
3	(Chinese Taipei) (Thailand)	Hsu, Ching-Wen / Lee, Pei-Chi; Kumkhum, Luksika / Plipuech, Peangtarn	5; 7	2; 6

=== Chinese Taipei vs. Japan ===
Chinese Taipei
0
New Delhi, India
February 08, 2018
Hard

Japan
3

			1	2	3
1	(Chinese Taipei) (Japan)	Hsu, Ching Wen; Kato, Miyu	2; 6	1; 6
2	(Chinese Taipei) (Japan)	Hsu, Chieh-Yu; Hibino, Nao	6^{8} 7^{10}	4; 6
3	(Chinese Taipei) (Japan)	Hsu, Ching Wen / Lee, Ya-Hsuan; Kato, Miyu / Ninomiya, Makoto	2; 6	6^{1} 7^{7}

=== Thailand vs. South Korea ===
Thailand
1
New Delhi, India
February 08, 2018
Hard

South Korea
2

			1	2	3
1	(Thailand) (South Korea)	Lertpitaksinchai, Nicha; Jeong, Sunam	7^{7} 6^{5}	2; 6	0; 6
2	(Thailand) (South Korea)	Kumkhum, Luksika; Han, Na-Lae	6; 0	2; 6	7; 5
3	(Thailand) (South Korea)	Kumkhum, Luksika / Plipuech, Peangtarn; Han, Na-Lae / Kim, Na Ri	7; 5	6^{3} 7^{7}	3; 6
