= 2018 Fed Cup Americas Zone Group I – play-offs =

Subsection of tennis competition

The play-offs of the 2018 Fed Cup Americas Zone Group I were the final stages of the Group I Zonal Competition involving teams from the Americas. Using the positions determined in their pools, the seven teams faced off to determine their placing in the 2018 Fed Cup Americas Zone Group I. The winner of the promotion play-off advanced to World Group II play-offs, and the losers of the relegation play-off were relegated down to the Americas Zone Group II.

== Pool results ==
Placing	Pool A	Pool B
1	Paraguay	Brazil
2	Colombia	Argentina
3	Chile	Venezuela
4	—N/a	Guatemala

== Promotion play-off ==
The first placed teams of the two pools were drawn in head-to-head rounds. The winner advanced to the World Group II play-offs.

=== Paraguay vs. Brazil ===
Paraguay
2
Club Internacional de Tenis, Asunción, Paraguay
10 February
Clay

Brazil
0

			1	2	3
1	(Paraguay) (Brazil)	Montserrat González; Nathaly Kurata	6; 1	6; 3
2	(Paraguay) (Brazil)	Verónica Cepede Royg; Beatriz Haddad Maia	6^{2} 7^{7}	7; 5	7^{11} 6^{9}
3	(Paraguay) (Brazil)	Verónica Cepede Royg / Montserrat González; Beatriz Haddad Maia / Luisa Stefani				not played

== Third place play-off ==
The runner-up teams of the two pools were drawn in head-to-head to determine the third and fourth placings.

=== Colombia vs. Argentina ===
Colombia
0
Club Internacional de Tenis, Asunción, Paraguay
10 February
Clay

Argentina
2

			1	2	3
1	(Colombia) (Argentina)	Juliana Valero; Paula Ormaechea	1; 6	4; 6
2	(Colombia) (Argentina)	María Paulina Pérez; Stephanie Mariel Petit	4; 6	4; 6
3	(Colombia) (Argentina)	María Paulina Pérez / Juliana Valero; María Irigoyen / Catalina Pella				not played

== Relegation play-offs ==
The bottom team of Pool A and the third placed team of Pool B were drawn in head-to-head. The loser was relegated down to Americas Zone Group II in 2019. The last placed team of Pool B (Guatemala) was automatically relegated.

=== Chile vs. Venezuela ===
Chile
2
Club Internacional de Tenis, Asunción, Paraguay
10 February
Clay

Venezuela
0

			1	2	3
1	(Chile) (Venezuela)	Alexa Guarachi; Aymet Uzcátegui	7^{7} 6^{3}	6; 2
2	(Chile) (Venezuela)	Fernanda Brito; Andrea Gámiz	6; 3	6; 3
3	(Chile) (Venezuela)	Fernanda Brito / Alexa Guarachi; Andrea Gámiz / Adriana Pérez				not played

== Final placements ==
Placing	Teams	
Promoted/First	Paraguay	
Second	Brazil	
Third	Argentina	
Fourth	Colombia	
Fifth	Chile	
Relegated/Sixth	Venezuela	Guatemala

- Paraguay was promoted to the 2018 Fed Cup World Group II play-offs.
- Venezuela and Guatemala were relegated to Americas Zone Group II in 2019.
