= 2018 Fed Cup Americas Zone Group I – Pool A =

Subsection of tennis competition

Pool A of the 2018 Fed Cup Americas Zone Group I was one of two pools in the Americas zone of the 2018 Fed Cup. Three teams competed in a round robin competition, with the top team and the bottom team proceeding to their respective sections of the play-offs: the top team played for advancement to the World Group II Play-offs, while the bottom team faced potential relegation to Group II.

== Standings ==
| | | PAR | COL | CHI | RR; W–L | Set; W–L | Game; W–L | Standings |
| 1 | Paraguay | | 3–0 | 2–1 | 2–0 | 10–4 (71%) | 81–56 (59%) | 1 |
| 5 | Colombia | 0–3 | | 3–0 | 1–1 | 6–8 (43%) | 62–66 (48%) | 2 |
| 4 | Chile | 1–2 | 0–3 | | 0–2 | 6–10 (38%) | 75–91 (45%) | 3 |

Standings are determined by: 1. number of wins; 2. number of matches; 3. in two-team ties, head-to-head records; 4. in three-team ties, (a) percentage of sets won (head-to-head records if two teams remain tied), then (b) percentage of games won (head-to-head records if two teams remain tied), then (c) Fed Cup rankings.

== Round-robin ==
=== Paraguay vs. Colombia ===
Paraguay
3
Club Internacional de Tenis, Asunción, Paraguay
7 February
Clay

Colombia
0

| | | | 1 | 2 | 3 |
|---|---|---|---|---|---|
| 1 | (Paraguay) (Colombia) | Montserrat González; Emiliana Arango | 6; 4 | 6; 3 |
| 2 | (Paraguay) (Colombia) | Verónica Cepede Royg; María Fernanda Herazo | 6; 2 | 6; 4 |
| 3 | (Paraguay) (Colombia) | Verónica Cepede Royg / Montserrat González; Emiliana Arango / María Fernanda Herazo | 6; 1 | 6; 2 |

=== Paraguay vs. Chile ===
Paraguay
2
Club Internacional de Tenis, Asunción, Paraguay
8 February
Clay

Chile
1

| | | | 1 | 2 | 3 |
|---|---|---|---|---|---|
| 1 | (Paraguay) (Chile) | Montserrat González; Alexa Guarachi | 6; 3 | 5; 7 | 7; 5 |
| 2 | (Paraguay) (Chile) | Verónica Cepede Royg; Daniela Seguel | 6^{6} 7^{8} | 4; 6 |
| 3 | (Paraguay) (Chile) | Verónica Cepede Royg / Montserrat González; Alexa Guarachi / Daniela Seguel | 5; 7 | 6; 3 | 6; 2 |

=== Chile vs. Colombia ===
Chile
0
Club Internacional de Tenis, Asunción, Paraguay
9 February
Clay

Colombia
3

| | | | 1 | 2 | 3 |
|---|---|---|---|---|---|---|
| 1 | (Chile) (Colombia) | Alexa Guarachi; Emiliana Arango | 2; 6 | 6^{4} 7^{7} |
| 2 | (Chile) (Colombia) | Daniela Seguel; María Fernanda Herazo | 6; 2 | 4; 6 | 0; 0 | retired |
| 3 | (Chile) (Colombia) | Fernanda Brito / Daniela Macarena López; Emiliana Arango / Juliana Valero | 6^{7} 7^{9} | 7^{7} 6^{5} | 4; 6 |
