= 2018 Fed Cup Asia/Oceania Zone Group I – play-offs =

Subsection of tennis competition

The play-offs games of the 2018 Fed Cup Asia/Oceania Zone Group I were the final stages of the Group I Zonal Competition, which involved teams from Asia and Oceania. Using the positions determined in their pools, the eight teams faced off to determine their placing in the 2018 Fed Cup Asia/Oceania Zone Group I. The winner of the promotional play-off advanced to the World Group II play-offs, while the losers of the relegation play-offs were relegated to the Asia/Oceania Zone Group II in 2019.

== Pool results ==
Placing	Pool A	Pool B
1	Kazakhstan	Japan
2	China	South Korea
3	India	Thailand
4	Hong Kong	Chinese Taipei

== Promotion play-off ==
The first placing teams of the two pools were drawn in head-to-head rounds. The winner advanced to the World Group II play-offs.

=== Kazakhstan vs. Japan ===
Kazakhstan
1
R.K. Khanna Tennis Complex, New Delhi, India
10 February
Hard

Japan
2

			1	2	3
1	(Kazakhstan) (Japan)	Zarina Diyas; Kurumi Nara	5; 7	4; 6
2	(Kazakhstan) (Japan)	Yulia Putintseva; Nao Hibino	6; 3	6; 4
3	(Kazakhstan) (Japan)	Zarina Diyas / Yulia Putintseva; Miyu Kato / Makoto Ninomiya	4; 6	5; 7

== 3rd place play-off ==
The second placed teams of the two pools were drawn in head-to-head rounds to find the third placed team.

=== China vs. South Korea ===
China
2
R.K. Khanna Tennis Complex, New Delhi, India
10 February
Hard

South Korea
0

			1	2	3
1	(China) (South Korea)	Yang Zhaoxuan; Lee So-ra	6; 3	6; 2
2	(China) (South Korea)	Zhu Lin; Jeong Su-nam	4; 6	7; 5	6; 1
3	(China) (South Korea)	Wang Yafan / Yang Zhaoxuan; Han Na-lae / Kim Na-ri				not played

== Relegation play-off ==
The third and fourth placed teams of the two pools were drawn in head-to-head rounds. The losers were relegated to Asia/Oceania Zone Group II in 2019.

=== India vs. Chinese Taipei ===
India
2
R.K. Khanna Tennis Complex, New Delhi, India
10 February
Hard

Chinese Taipei
0

			1	2	3
1	(India) (Chinese Taipei)	Karman Thandi; Lee Pei-chi	7^{7} 6^{4}	6; 3
2	(India) (Chinese Taipei)	Ankita Raina; Hsu Chieh-yu	6; 4	5; 7	6; 1
3	(India) (Chinese Taipei)	Ankita Raina / Prarthana Thombare; Hsu Ching-wen / Lee Ya-hsuan				not played

=== Thailand vs. Hong Kong ===
Thailand
2
R.K. Khanna Tennis Complex, New Delhi, India
10 February
Hard

Hong Kong
1

			1	2	3
1	(Thailand) (Hong Kong)	Patcharin Cheapchandej; Eudice Chong	3; 6	3; 6
2	(Thailand) (Hong Kong)	Peangtarn Plipuech; Zhang Ling	6; 4	6; 4
3	(Thailand) (Hong Kong)	Nicha Lertpitaksinchai / Peangtarn Plipuech; Eudice Chong / Zhang Ling	6; 3	6; 1

== Final placements ==
Placing	Teams	
Promoted/First	Japan	
Second	Kazakhstan	
Third	China	
Fourth	South Korea	
Fifth	India	Thailand
Relegated/Seventh	Chinese Taipei	Hong Kong

- Japan was promoted to the 2018 Fed Cup World Group II play-offs.
- Chinese Taipei and Hong Kong were relegated to Asia/Oceania Zone Group II in 2019.

== See also ==
- Fed Cup structure
