= 2018 Fed Cup Americas Zone Group I =

International tennis competition

The Fed Cup Americas Zone Group I is the first stage of the Zonal Groups from the Americas to determine who will advance to the World Group play-offs, and who will be relegated to the World Group II play-offs.

== Participating teams ==
- Paraguay
- Argentina
- Brazil
- Chile
- Colombia
- Venezuela
- Guatemala

== Pools ==
	Pool A	PAR	COL	CHI
1	Paraguay (2–0)		3–0	2–1
2	Colombia (1–1)	0–3		3–0
3	Chile (0–2)	1–2	0–3	

	Pool B	BRA	ARG	VEN	GUA
1	Brazil (3–0)		2–1	2–1	3–0
2	Argentina (2–1)	1–2		3–0	3–0
3	Venezuela (1–2)	1–2	0–3		3–0
4	Guatemala (0–3)	0–3	0–3	0–3	

== Pool A ==
=== Paraguay vs. Colombia ===
Paraguay
3
Asunción, Paraguay
7 February
Clay

Colombia
0

			1	2	3
1	(Paraguay) (Colombia)	Montserrat González; Emiliana Arango	6; 4	6; 3
2	(Paraguay) (Colombia)	Verónica Cepede Royg; María Herazo González	6; 2	6; 4
3	(Paraguay) (Colombia)	Verónica Cepede Royg / Montserrat González; Emiliana Arango / María Herazo González	6; 1	6; 2

=== Paraguay vs. Chile ===
Paraguay
2
Asunción, Paraguay
8 February
Clay

Chile
1

			1	2	3
1	(Paraguay) (Chile)	Montserrat González; Alexa Guarachi	6; 3	5; 7	7; 5
2	(Paraguay) (Chile)	Verónica Cepede Royg; Daniela Seguel	6^{6} 7^{8}	4; 6
3	(Paraguay) (Chile)	Verónica Cepede Royg / Montserrat González; Alexa Guarachi / Daniela Seguel	5; 7	6; 3	6; 2

=== Chile vs. Colombia ===
Chile
0
Asunción, Paraguay
9 February
Clay

Colombia
3

			1	2	3
1	(Chile) (Colombia)	Alexa Guarachi; Emiliana Arango	2; 6	6^{5} 7^{7}
2	(Chile) (Colombia)	Daniela Seguel; María Herazo González	6; 2	4; 6	Ret
3	(Chile) (Colombia)	Fernanda Brito / Daniela Macarena Lopez; Emiliana Arango / Juliana Valero	6^{7} 7^{9}	7^{7} 6^{5}	4; 6

== Pool B ==
=== Brazil vs. Venezuela ===
Brazil
2
Asunción, Paraguay
7 February
Clay

Venezuela
1

			1	2	3
1	(Brazil) (Venezuela)	Gabriela Cé; Aymet Uzcátegui	2; 6	6; 2	5; 7
2	(Brazil) (Venezuela)	Beatriz Haddad Maia; Andrea Gámiz	7^{7} 6^{4}	6; 4
3	(Brazil) (Venezuela)	Beatriz Haddad Maia / Luisa Stefani; Andrea Gámiz / Adriana Pérez	6; 1	7; 5

=== Argentina vs. Guatemala ===
Argentina
3
Asunción, Paraguay
7 February
Clay

Guatemala
0

			1	2	3
1	(Argentina) (Guatemala)	Paula Ormaechea; Daniela Schippers	7; 5	6; 2
2	(Argentina) (Guatemala)	Catalina Pella; Kirsten-Andrea Weedon	6; 0	6^{8} 7^{10}	6; 2
3	(Argentina) (Guatemala)	María Irigoyen / Stephanie Mariel Petit; Melissa Morales / Daniela Schippers	6; 4	6; 1

=== Brazil vs. Guatemala ===
Brazil
3
Asunción, Paraguay
8 February
Clay

Guatemala
0

			1	2	3
1	(Brazil) (Guatemala)	Nathaly Kurata; Melissa Morales	6; 2	6; 2
2	(Brazil) (Guatemala)	Beatriz Haddad Maia; Kirsten-Andrea Weedon	6; 1	6; 1
3	(Brazil) (Guatemala)	Gabriela Cé / Luisa Stefani; Gabriela Rivera / Kirsten-Andrea Weedon	6; 3	3; 6	7^{7} 6^{3}

=== Argentina vs. Venezuela ===
Argentina
3
Asunción, Paraguay
8 February
Clay

Venezuela
0

			1	2	3
1	(Argentina) (Venezuela)	Paula Ormaechea; Aymet Uzcátegui	6; 4	1; 6	6; 1
2	(Argentina) (Venezuela)	Catalina Pella; Andrea Gámiz	4; 6	6; 0	6; 1
3	(Argentina) (Venezuela)	María Irigoyen / Stephanie Mariel Petit; Adriana Pérez / Lucelena Pérez	7^{8} 6^{6}	6; 4

=== Argentina vs. Brazil ===
Argentina
1
Asunción, Paraguay
9 February
Clay

Brazil
2

			1	2	3
1	(Argentina) (Brazil)	Paula Ormaechea; Nathaly Kurata	7; 5	6; 0
2	(Argentina) (Brazil)	Catalina Pella; Beatriz Haddad Maia	2; 6	6; 4	4; 6
3	(Argentina) (Brazil)	María Irigoyen / Catalina Pella; Beatriz Haddad Maia / Luisa Stefani	1; 6	6; 3	2; 6

=== Guatemala vs. Venezuela ===
Guatemala
0
Asunción, Paraguay
9 February
Clay

Venezuela
3

			1	2	3
1	(Guatemala) (Venezuela)	Daniela Schippers; Aymet Uzcátegui	7^{7} 6^{5}	3; 6	6^{4} 7^{7}
2	(Guatemala) (Venezuela)	Kirsten-Andrea Weedon; Andrea Gámiz	6; 3	4; 6	2; 6
3	(Guatemala) (Venezuela)	Melissa Morales / Gabriela Rivera; Adriana Pérez / Lucelena Pérez	2; 6	5; 7
