= 2015 Copa Colsanitas – Doubles =

Tennis tournament

Doubles
- 2015 Copa Colsanitas

Final
- Champions: (Brazil) Paula Cristina Gonçalves (Brazil) Beatriz Haddad Maia
- Runners-up: (United States) Irina Falconi (United States) Shelby Rogers
- Score: 6–3, 3–6, [10–6]

Details
- Draw: 16
- Seeds: 4

Events
| Singles | Doubles |
| ← 2014 · | Copa Colsanitas | · 2016 → |

Lara Arruabarrena and Caroline Garcia were the defending champions, but they both chose to participate in Fed Cup ties this year.
Paula Cristina Gonçalves and Beatriz Haddad Maia won the title, defeating Irina Falconi and Shelby Rogers in the final, 6–3, 3–6, [10–6].

== Seeds ==
1. (Australia) Anastasia Rodionova / (Australia) Arina Rodionova (quarterfinals)
2. (Luxembourg) Mandy Minella / (Ukraine) Olga Savchuk (first round)
3. (Croatia) Darija Jurak / (Germany) Tatjana Maria (quarterfinals)
4. (Romania) Elena Bogdan / (United States) Nicole Melichar (quarterfinals)

== Draw ==
=== Key ===
- Q = Qualifier
- WC = Wild card
- LL = Lucky loser
- Alt = Alternate
- SE = Special exempt
- PR = Protected ranking
- ITF = ITF entry
- JE = Junior exempt
- w/o = Walkover
- r = Retired
- d = Defaulted
- SR = Special ranking

=== Draw ===
First round
1 | (Australia) An Rodionova (Australia) Ar Rodionova | 6 | 6
(Russia) M Melnikova (Georgia (country)) S Shapatava | 4 | 2
WC | (Colombia) MP Pérez García (Colombia) P Pérez García | 0 | 3
(United States) I Falconi (United States) S Rogers | 6 | 6
3 | (Croatia) D Jurak (Germany) T Maria | 3 | 6 | [10]
(Montenegro) D Kovinić (Brazil) T Pereira | 6 | 0 | [3]
(Colombia) M Duque Mariño (Puerto Rico) M Puig | 3 | 6 | [10]
(United States) J Abaza (United States) S Marand | 6 | 2 | [4]
(Russia) I Khromacheva (Ukraine) M Zanevska | 6 | 6
(Japan) K Date-Krumm (Israel) J Glushko | 2 | 2
(Slovenia) N Kolar (Belgium) E Mertens | 6^{3} | 4
4 | (Romania) E Bogdan (United States) N Melichar | 7^{7} | 6
(Spain) B García Vidagany (Argentina) F Molinero | 1 | 1
(Brazil) PC Gonçalves (Brazil) B Haddad Maia | 6 | 6
(Romania) S Cîrstea (Kazakhstan) Y Shvedova | 7 | 6
2 | (Luxembourg) M Minella (Ukraine) O Savchuk | 5 | 2

Quarterfinals
1 | (Australia) An Rodionova (Australia) Ar Rodionova | 5 | 6^{5}
(United States) I Falconi (United States) S Rogers | 7 | 7^{7}
3 | (Croatia) D Jurak (Germany) T Maria | 3 | 2
(Colombia) M Duque Mariño (Puerto Rico) M Puig | 6 | 6
(Russia) I Khromacheva (Ukraine) M Zanevska | 6 | 6
4 | (Romania) E Bogdan (United States) N Melichar | 1 | 2
(Brazil) PC Gonçalves (Brazil) B Haddad Maia | 6 | 7
(Romania) S Cîrstea (Kazakhstan) Y Shvedova | 3 | 5

Semifinals
(United States) I Falconi (United States) S Rogers | 4 | 6 | [10]
(Colombia) M Duque Mariño (Puerto Rico) M Puig | 6 | 1 | [8]
(Russia) I Khromacheva (Ukraine) M Zanevska | 4 | 0
(Brazil) PC Gonçalves (Brazil) B Haddad Maia | 6 | 6

Final
(United States) I Falconi (United States) S Rogers | 3 | 6 | [6]
(Brazil) PC Gonçalves (Brazil) B Haddad Maia | 6 | 3 | [10]
