= 2015 Copa Colsanitas – Singles =

Singles
- 2015 Copa Colsanitas

Final
- Champion: (Brazil) Teliana Pereira
- Runner-up: (Kazakhstan) Yaroslava Shvedova
- Score: 7–6^{(7–2)}, 6–1

Details
- Draw: 32
- Seeds: 8

Events
Singles	Doubles
← 2014 ·	Copa Colsanitas	· 2016 →

Caroline Garcia was the defending champion, but she chose to participate in the Fed Cup semifinals this year.

Teliana Pereira won her first WTA title, defeating Yaroslava Shvedova in the final, 7–6^{(7–2)}, 6–1. Pereira became the first Brazilian woman to win a WTA title since Niege Dias in the 1988 Spanish Open.

== Seeds ==
1. (Ukraine) Elina Svitolina (semifinals)
2. (Puerto Rico) Monica Puig (quarterfinals)
3. (Croatia) Ajla Tomljanović (first round)
4. (Italy) Francesca Schiavone (first round)
5. (Kazakhstan) Yaroslava Shvedova (final)
6. (United States) Shelby Rogers (first round)
7. (Hungary) Tímea Babos (first round)
8. (United States) Irina Falconi (quarterfinals)

== Draw ==
=== Key ===
- Q = Qualifier
- WC = Wild card
- LL = Lucky loser
- Alt = Alternate
- SE = Special exempt
- PR = Protected ranking
- ITF = ITF entry
- JE = Junior exempt
- w/o = Walkover
- r = Retired
- d = Defaulted
- SR = Special ranking

=== Finals ===
Semifinals
1	(Ukraine) Elina Svitolina	6^{7}	3
(Brazil) Teliana Pereira	7^{9}	6
(Colombia) Mariana Duque Mariño	4	6	4
5	(Kazakhstan) Yaroslava Shvedova	6	3	6

Final
(Brazil) Teliana Pereira	7^{7}	6
5	(Kazakhstan) Yaroslava Shvedova	6^{2}	1

=== Top half ===
First round
1	(Ukraine) E Svitolina	6	6
(United States) L Chirico	2	1
WC	(Colombia) MP Pérez García	4	1
(Montenegro) D Kovinić	6	6
(Japan) K Date-Krumm	2	5
(Germany) D Pfizenmaier	6	7
(Romania) S Cîrstea	4	1
8	(United States) I Falconi	6	6
4	(Italy) F Schiavone	1	4
(Brazil) T Pereira	6	6
(Austria) P Mayr-Achleitner	6	5	2
Q	(Luxembourg) M Minella	4	7	6
WC	(Colombia) M Herazo González	3	6	6^{2}
Q	(Brazil) B Haddad Maia	6	2	7^{7}
(Spain) L Domínguez Lino	6	6
6	(United States) S Rogers	3	2

Second round
1	(Ukraine) E Svitolina	6	6
(Montenegro) D Kovinić	3	1
(Germany) D Pfizenmaier	7	2	3
8	(United States) I Falconi	5	6	6
(Brazil) T Pereira	7	7
Q	(Luxembourg) M Minella	5	5
Q	(Brazil) B Haddad Maia	6^{5}	0
(Spain) L Domínguez Lino	7^{7}	6

Quarterfinals
1	(Ukraine) E Svitolina	6	7
8	(United States) I Falconi	3	5
(Brazil) T Pereira	6	6
(Spain) L Domínguez Lino	0	4

Semifinals
1	(Ukraine) E Svitolina	6^{7}	3
(Brazil) T Pereira	7^{9}	6

=== Bottom half ===
First round
7	(Hungary) T Babos	4	7^{12}	3
(Colombia) M Duque Mariño	6	6^{10}	6
(Germany) T Maria	6	6
WC	(Colombia) Y Lizarazo	3	2
Q	(Slovenia) N Kolar	3	1
(Israel) J Glushko	6	6
(Russia) A Panova	6	6
3	(Croatia) A Tomljanović	4	1
5	(Kazakhstan) Y Shvedova	6	6^{5}	6
(Ukraine) M Zanevska	4	7^{7}	2
(Slovakia) K Kučová	0	7	4
Q	(United States) S Vickery	6	5	6
(United States) N Gibbs	6	7
Q	(Australia) An Rodionova	3	5
Q	(Netherlands) C Burger	2	3
2	(Puerto Rico) M Puig	6	6

Second round
(Colombia) M Duque Mariño	6	6
(Germany) T Maria	4	4
(Israel) J Glushko	6	6
(Russia) A Panova	4	2
5	(Kazakhstan) Y Shvedova	6	6
Q	(United States) S Vickery	0	2
(United States) N Gibbs	4	2
2	(Puerto Rico) M Puig	6	6

Quarterfinals
(Colombia) M Duque Mariño	7	6
(Israel) J Glushko	5	3
5	(Kazakhstan) Y Shvedova	7^{7}	6
2	(Puerto Rico) M Puig	6^{1}	2

Semifinals
(Colombia) M Duque Mariño	4	6	4
5	(Kazakhstan) Y Shvedova	6	3	6

== Qualifying ==
=== Seeds ===
1. (United States) Sachia Vickery (qualified)
2. (Australia) Anastasia Rodionova (qualified)
3. (Romania) Ana Bogdan (qualifying competition)
4. (Brazil) Beatriz Haddad Maia (qualified)
5. (Russia) Marina Melnikova (qualifying competition)
6. (Luxembourg) Mandy Minella (qualified)
7. (Spain) Laura Pous Tió (qualifying competition)
8. (Belgium) Elise Mertens (qualifying competition)
9. (Georgia (country)) Sofia Shapatava (qualifying competition)
10. (Netherlands) Cindy Burger (qualified)
11. (Australia) Arina Rodionova (first round)
12. (Argentina) Florencia Molinero (qualifying competition)

=== Qualifiers ===
1. (United States) Sachia Vickery
2. (Australia) Anastasia Rodionova
3. (Slovenia) Nastja Kolar
4. (Brazil) Beatriz Haddad Maia
5. (Netherlands) Cindy Burger
6. (Luxembourg) Mandy Minella

=== Draw ===
==== First qualifier ====
First round
1	(United States) Sachia Vickery	6	6
(Slovenia) Tadeja Majerič	3	2
(Japan) Naomi Osaka	1	3
7	(Spain) Laura Pous Tió	6	6

Qualifying competition
1	(United States) Sachia Vickery	7	4	6
7	(Spain) Laura Pous Tió	5	6	4

==== Second qualifier ====
First round
2	(Australia) Anastasia Rodionova	7^{7}	6
(Ukraine) Olga Savchuk	6^{0}	2
WC	(Colombia) Yuliana Monroy	1	3
9	(Georgia (country)) Sofia Shapatava	6	6

Qualifying competition
2	(Australia) Anastasia Rodionova	3	6	6
9	(Georgia (country)) Sofia Shapatava	6	3	4

==== Third qualifier ====
First round
3	(Romania) Ana Bogdan	6	2	6
(Spain) Beatriz García Vidagany	4	6	4
(Slovenia) Nastja Kolar	4	6	6
11	(Australia) Arina Rodionova	6	4	3

Qualifying competition
3	(Romania) Ana Bogdan	5	3
(Slovenia) Nastja Kolar	7	6

==== Fourth qualifier ====
First round
4	(Brazil) Beatriz Haddad Maia	6	6
WC	(Colombia) Paula Pérez García	2	1
WC	(Colombia) Laura Arciniegas	1	6^{3}
12	(Argentina) Florencia Molinero	6	7^{7}

Qualifying competition
4	(Brazil) Beatriz Haddad Maia	6	6
12	(Argentina) Florencia Molinero	3	4

==== Fifth qualifier ====
First round
5	(Russia) Marina Melnikova	7^{7}	1	6
(Mexico) Marcela Zacarías	6^{5}	6	0
WC	(Colombia) Sofía Múnera Sánchez	3	2
10	(Netherlands) Cindy Burger	6	6

Qualifying competition
5	(Russia) Marina Melnikova	7^{7}	5	4
10	(Netherlands) Cindy Burger	6^{4}	7	6

==== Sixth qualifier ====
First round
6	(Luxembourg) Mandy Minella	7^{7}	5	7^{7}
(United States) Sanaz Marand	6^{4}	7	6^{5}
(Brazil) Gabriela Cé	3	1
8	(Belgium) Elise Mertens	6	6

Qualifying competition
6	(Luxembourg) Mandy Minella	6	6
8	(Belgium) Elise Mertens	2	4
