= 2015 Copa Colsanitas =

Women's tennis tournament

- Date: 13–19 April
- Edition: 18th
- Category: WTA International
- Draw: 32S / 16D
- Prize money: $250,000
- Surface: Clay
- Location: Bogotá, Colombia

Champions

Singles
- (Brazil) Teliana Pereira

Doubles
- (Brazil) Paula Cristina Gonçalves / (Brazil) Beatriz Haddad Maia
- Copa Colsanitas

The 2015 Copa Colsanitas was a women's tennis tournament played on outdoor clay courts. It was the 18th edition of the Copa Colsanitas, and part of the International category of the 2015 WTA Tour. It took place at the Centro de Alto Rendimiento in Bogotá, Colombia, from 13 April through 19 April 2015. First-seeded Teliana Pereira won the singles title.

== Finals ==
=== Singles ===
- (Brazil) Teliana Pereira defeated (Kazakhstan) Yaroslava Shvedova, 7–6^{(7–2)}, 6–1

=== Doubles ===
- (Brazil) Paula Cristina Gonçalves / (Brazil) Beatriz Haddad Maia defeated (United States) Irina Falconi / (United States) Shelby Rogers, 6–3, 3–6, [10–6]

== Points and prize money ==
=== Point distribution ===
Event	W	F	SF	QF	Round of 16	Round of 32	Q	Q3	Q2	Q1
Singles	280	180	110	60	30	1	18	14	10	1
Doubles	280	180	110	60	1	—N/a	—N/a	—N/a	—N/a	—N/a

=== Prize money ===
Event	W	F	SF	QF	Round of 16	Round of 32	Q3	Q2	Q1
Singles	$43,000	$21,400	$11,300	$5,900	$3,310	$1,925	$1,005	$730	$530
Doubles	$12,300	$6,400	$3,435	$1,820	$960	—N/a	—N/a	—N/a	—N/a

== Singles main-draw entrants ==
=== Seeds ===
Country	Player	Rank^{1}	Seed
UKR	Elina Svitolina	29	1
PUR	Monica Puig	51	2
CRO	Ajla Tomljanović	60	3
ITA	Francesca Schiavone	69	4
KAZ	Yaroslava Shvedova	78	5
USA	Shelby Rogers	80	6
HUN	Tímea Babos	87	7
USA	Irina Falconi	88	8

- Rankings are as of April 6, 2015.

=== Other entrants ===
The following players received wildcards into the singles main draw:

- (Colombia) María Herazo González
- (Colombia) Yuliana Lizarazo
- (Colombia) María Paulina Pérez García

The following players received entry from the qualifying draw:

- (Netherlands) Cindy Burger
- (Brazil) Beatriz Haddad Maia
- (Slovenia) Nastja Kolar
- (Luxembourg) Mandy Minella
- (Australia) Anastasia Rodionova
- (United States) Sachia Vickery

=== Withdrawals ===
Before the tournament

- (Spain) Lara Arruabarrena → replaced by (Romania) Sorana Cîrstea
- (United States) Varvara Lepchenko → replaced by (Montenegro) Danka Kovinić
- (United States) Christina McHale → replaced by (Slovakia) Kristína Kučová
- (United Kingdom) Laura Robson → replaced by (Austria) Patricia Mayr-Achleitner
- (United States) Anna Tatishvili → replaced by (Germany) Dinah Pfizenmaier

== Doubles main-draw entrants ==
=== Seeds ===
Country	Player	Country	Player	Rank^{1}	Seed
AUS	Anastasia Rodionova	AUS	Arina Rodionova	68	1
LUX	Mandy Minella	UKR	Olga Savchuk	136	2
CRO	Darija Jurak	GER	Tatjana Maria	154	3
ROU	Elena Bogdan	USA	Nicole Melichar	199	4

- Rankings are as of April 6, 2015.

=== Other entrants ===
The following pair received a wildcard into the doubles main draw:

- (Colombia) María Paulina Pérez García / (Colombia) Paula Pérez García
