= Teliana Pereira =

Brazilian tennis player (born 1988)

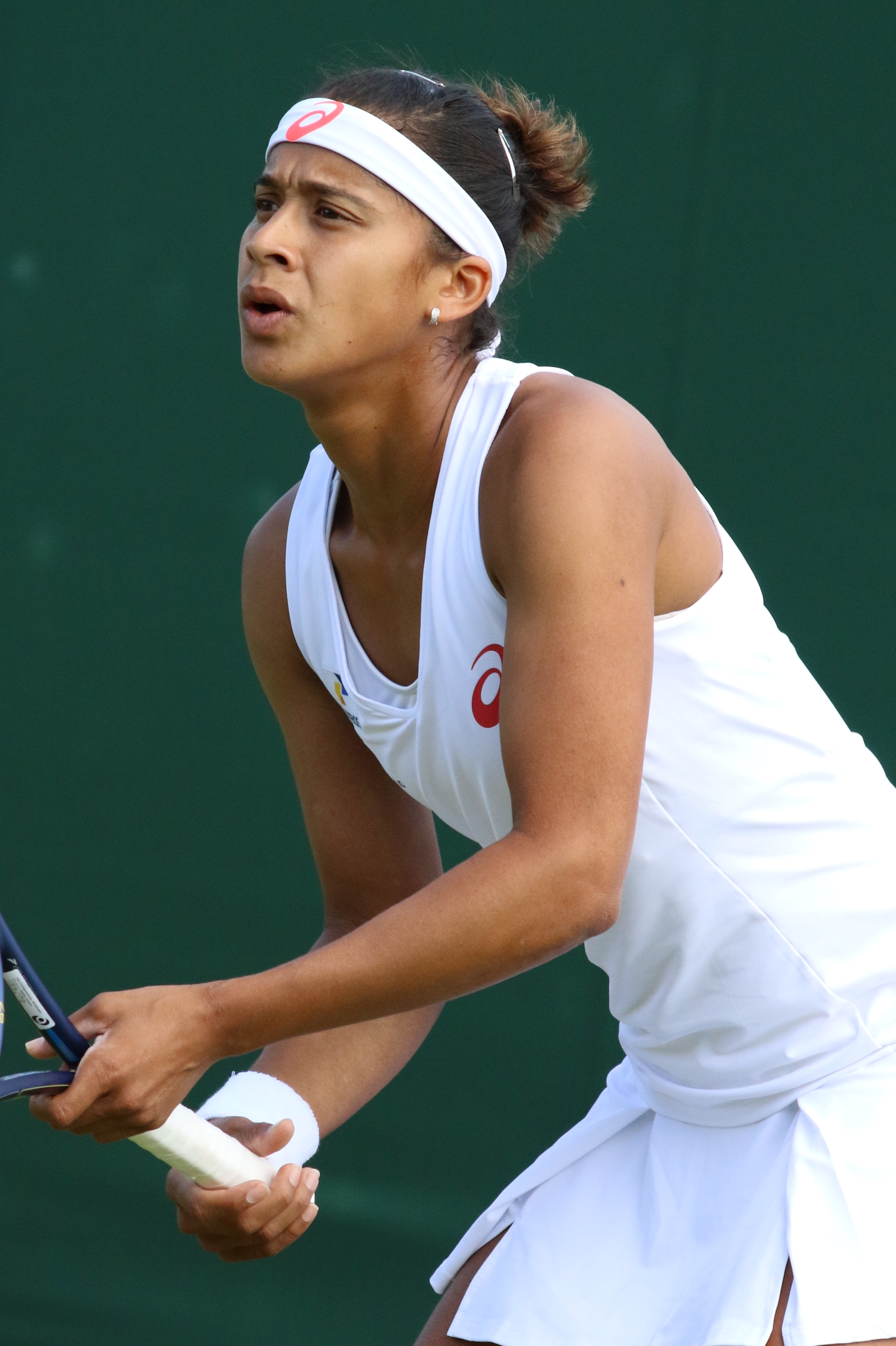
- Teliana Pereira at the 2016 Wimbledon qualifying
- Full name: Teliana Santos Pereira
- Country (sports): Brazil
- Residence: Curitiba, Brazil
- Born: 20 July 1988 (age 38) Águas Belas, Brazil
- Height: 1.68 m (5 ft 6 in)
- Retired: 2020
- Plays: Right (two-handed backhand)
- Prize money: $1,068,880

Singles
- Career record: 419–249
- Career titles: 2
- Highest ranking: No. 43 (19 October 2015)

Grand Slam singles results
- Australian Open: 1R (2014, 2016)
- French Open: 2R (2014, 2015, 2016)
- Wimbledon: 1R (2014, 2015, 2016)
- US Open: 1R (2014, 2015, 2016)

Other tournaments
- Olympic Games: 1R (2016)

Doubles
- Career record: 122–85
- Career titles: 10 ITF
- Highest ranking: No. 117 (16 September 2013)

Grand Slam doubles results
- Australian Open: 1R (2014, 2016)
- Wimbledon: Q2 (2013)
- US Open: 1R (2015)

Other doubles tournaments
- Olympic Games: 1R (2016)

Team competitions
- Fed Cup: 26–11
Medal record
Women's tennis
Representing Brazil
Pan American Games
Bronze medal – third place	2007 Rio de Janeiro	Doubles
South American Games
Gold medal – first place	2006 Buenos Aires	Singles
Gold medal – first place	2006 Buenos Aires	Doubles

Teliana Santos Pereira (born 20 July 1988) is a Brazilian former professional tennis player.

On 19 April 2015, she became the first Brazilian in 27 years to win a title on the WTA Tour, beating Yaroslava Shvedova in Bogotá. She achieved a singles ranking of world No. 48 in August 2015, after having won her second career title at Florianópolis by defeating German player Annika Beck, in three sets.

On 19 October 2015, she reached her best singles ranking of world No. 43. Pereira won 22 singles and ten doubles titles on the ITF Women's Circuit.

Playing for the Brazil Fed Cup team, she was one of the players who have most represented Brazil: she participated in 26 matches and won 26 (17 in singles, 9 in doubles).

She is the sister of the Brazilian tennis player José Pereira.

She is currently married to the former Brazilian professional soccer player and club world champion Paulo André, with whom she has a son named Matteo.

== Early and personal life ==
Teliana Pereira was born on 20 July 1988 in Águas Belas, in the semi-arid region of Pernambuco, where she had to overcome a childhood on the fringes of poverty. Pereira was coached by her brother, Renato. Pereira's parents are Jose, who worked at a sugar cane plantation, and Maria; she has three brothers and three sisters. At a very young age, her father decided to leave his life as a sugarcane cutter and moved to Curitiba, where he had two brothers, and once he got a job at a tennis academy as a construction worker, he arranged for the rest of the family to follow him tand to try their luck. Everyone got work at the academy as well, with Teliana being a ball girl.

After the construction had finished, her father was hired to manage the place: he tidied, cleaned, and worked at the bar. Teliana, who had never studied before, started attending school and in the afternoons helped at the academy with her siblings.

Given the academy owner, Frenchman Didier Rayon, brought the Pereira children to the court whenever a student did not show up, Pereira started playing at age 8, and said that she already had grown an interest watching Renato play. One year later, she entered a tournament and won, her first title, barely knowing the rules well and relying on someone to help her with the points she scored. That's how she found out she had been the champion, making Rayon decide to become her coach.

Pereira's favorite tournament is the French Open. Her childhood tennis idol was Gustavo Kuerten. Her favourite surface is clay.

== Career ==
Pereira competed in the Rio de Janeiro Pan American Games in 2007, winning the bronze medal with Joana Cortez on the women's doubles competition.

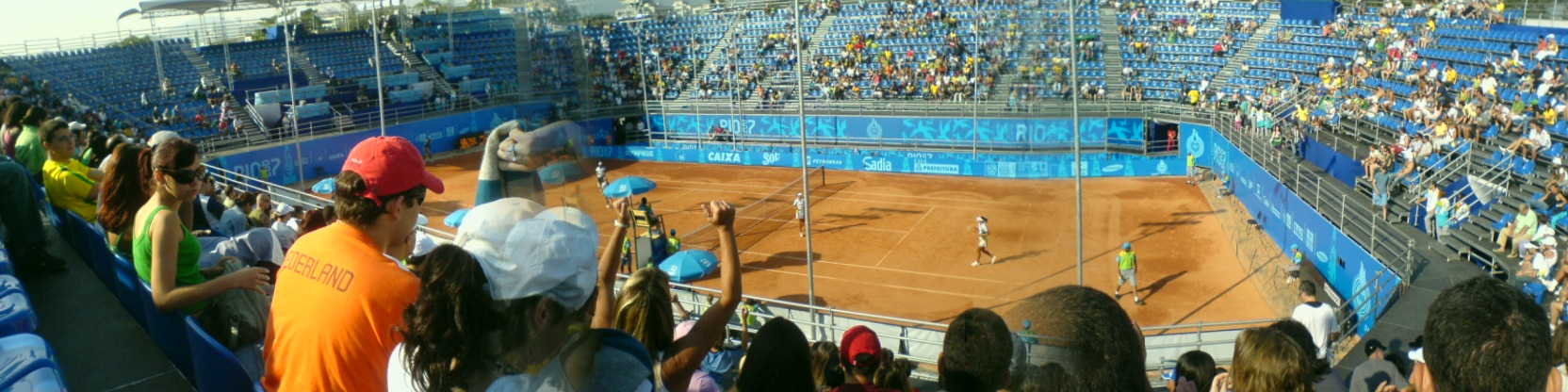
Teliana Pereira and Joana Cortez playing at the 2007 Pan American Games

Pereira was at the best moment of her career in 2009 when two knee injuries sidelined her. She underwent two surgeries and was out of action for a year and a half. During her recovery, she lost her sponsors and needed the help of friends to return to playing, even resorting to raffles to finance her. In that period she had to start from scratch, playing in Futures tennis events qualifiers at the beginning, but it did not take long for her to find her way back to victory, winning her first title since her return in October 2010.

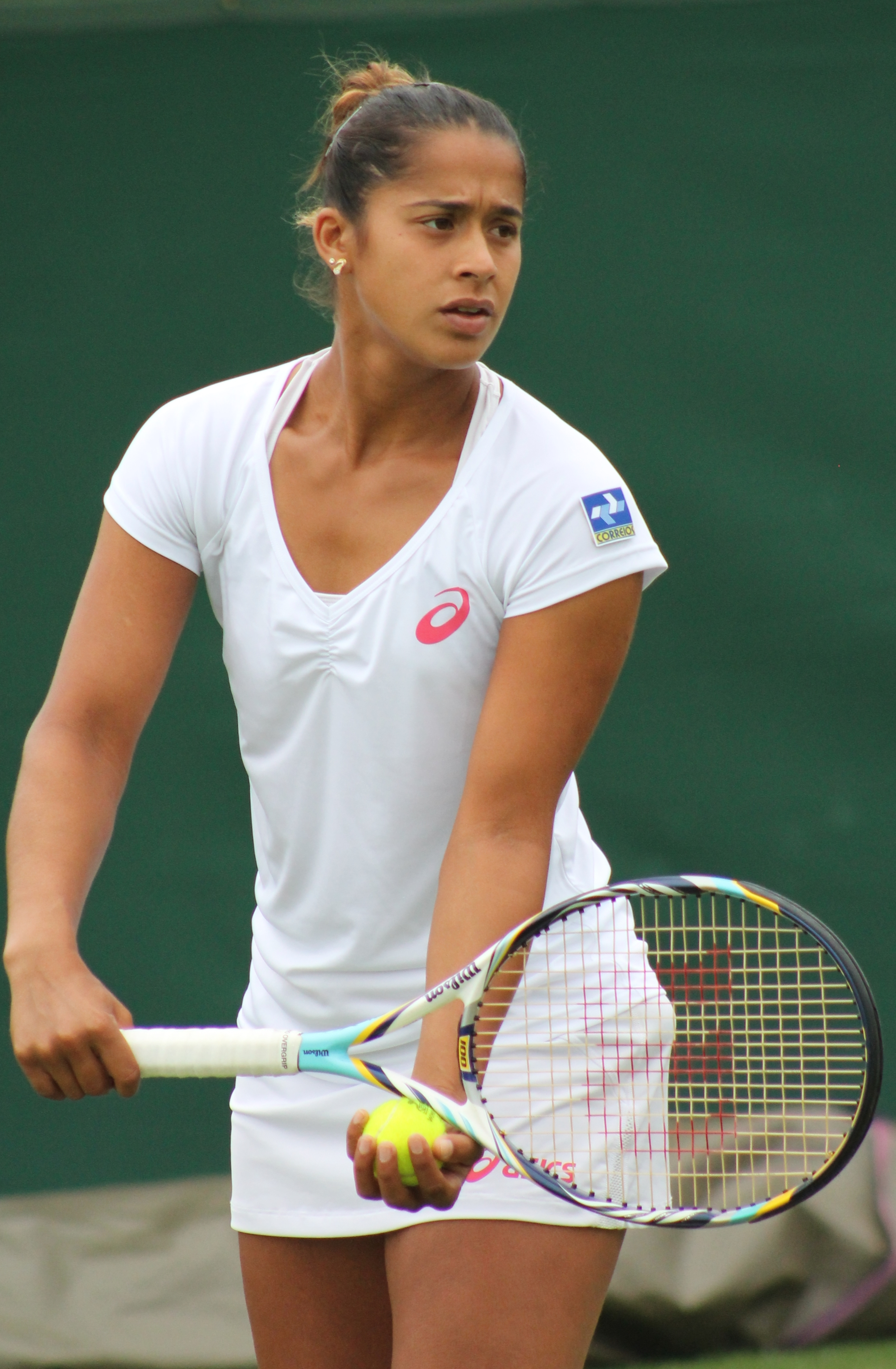
Pereira at the 2013 Wimbledon Championships.

In February 2013, Pereira reached the semifinals of Copa Colsanitas as a qualifier, which boosted her singles ranking to 116.

In February 2014, she reached the semifinals of the Rio Open.

In April 2015, Pereira reached the final of Copa Colsanitas where she won her first career title beating fifth seed Yaroslava Shvedova, in straight sets, to become the first Brazilian woman to win a WTA Tour singles title since 1988, and jumping 130 places up the WTA rankings to No. 81.

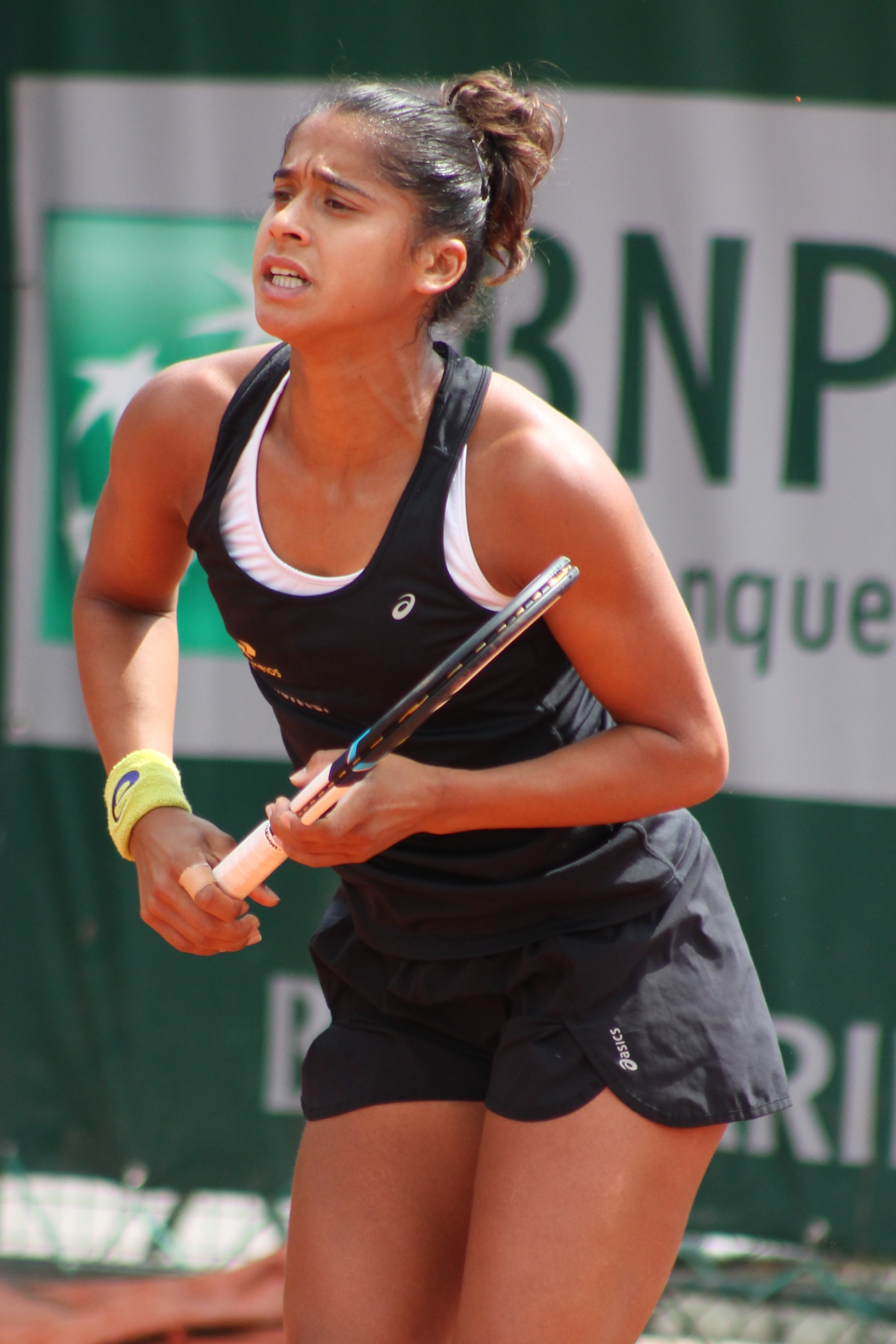
Pereira at the 2015 French Open

In July 2015, she won her second WTA Tour title at the Brasil Tennis Cup in Florianópolis. With the result, Pereira entered the top 50 for the first time. She was just the second Brazilian in the Open era to win a tour title in Brazil – Niege Dias achieved the feat once, doing it over in Guarujá in 1987.

Pereira performed very poorly throughout 2016 and finally dropped out of top 200 by the end of the season.

In 2016, she participated at the Rio de Janeiro Olympic Games, stopping at the first round of singles and doubles, playing alongside Paula Cristina Gonçalves, and at the second round of mixed doubles, alongside Marcelo Melo. In September 2020, Pereira announced her retirement at the age of 32, declaring she had lost interest in training and travels, while expressing satisfaction with how her career went, with two WTA Tour titles and "always surpassing my expectations". Since then, she has commented tennis on ESPN Brazil and ran an academy on Campo Largo, Paraná.

== Grand Slam performance timeline ==
Key
W	F	SF	QF	#R	RR	Q#	P#	DNQ	A	Z#	PO	G	S	B	NMS	NTI	P	NH

(W) winner; (F) finalist; (SF) semifinalist; (QF) quarterfinalist; (#R) rounds 4, 3, 2, 1; (RR) round-robin stage; (Q#) qualification round; (P#) preliminary round; (DNQ) did not qualify; (A) absent; (Z#) Davis/Fed Cup Zonal Group (with number indication) or (PO) play-off; (G) gold, (S) silver or (B) bronze Olympic/Paralympic medal; (NMS) not a Masters tournament; (NTI) not a Tier I tournament; (P) postponed; (NH) not held; (SR) strike rate (events won / competed); (W–L) win–loss record.
To avoid confusion and double counting, these charts are updated at the conclusion of a tournament or when the player's participation has ended.

=== Singles ===
Tournament	2008	2009	2010	2011	2012	2013	2014	2015	2016	2017	W–L
Australian Open	A	A	A	A	A	Q1	1R	Q2	1R	Q2	0–2
French Open	A	A	A	A	A	Q3	2R	2R	2R	A	3–3
Wimbledon	Q1	A	A	A	Q1	Q2	1R	1R	1R	A	0–3
US Open	A	A	A	A	Q1	Q1	1R	1R	1R	A	0–3
Win–Loss	0–0	0–0	0–0	0–0	0–0	0–0	1–4	1–3	1–4	0–0	3–11

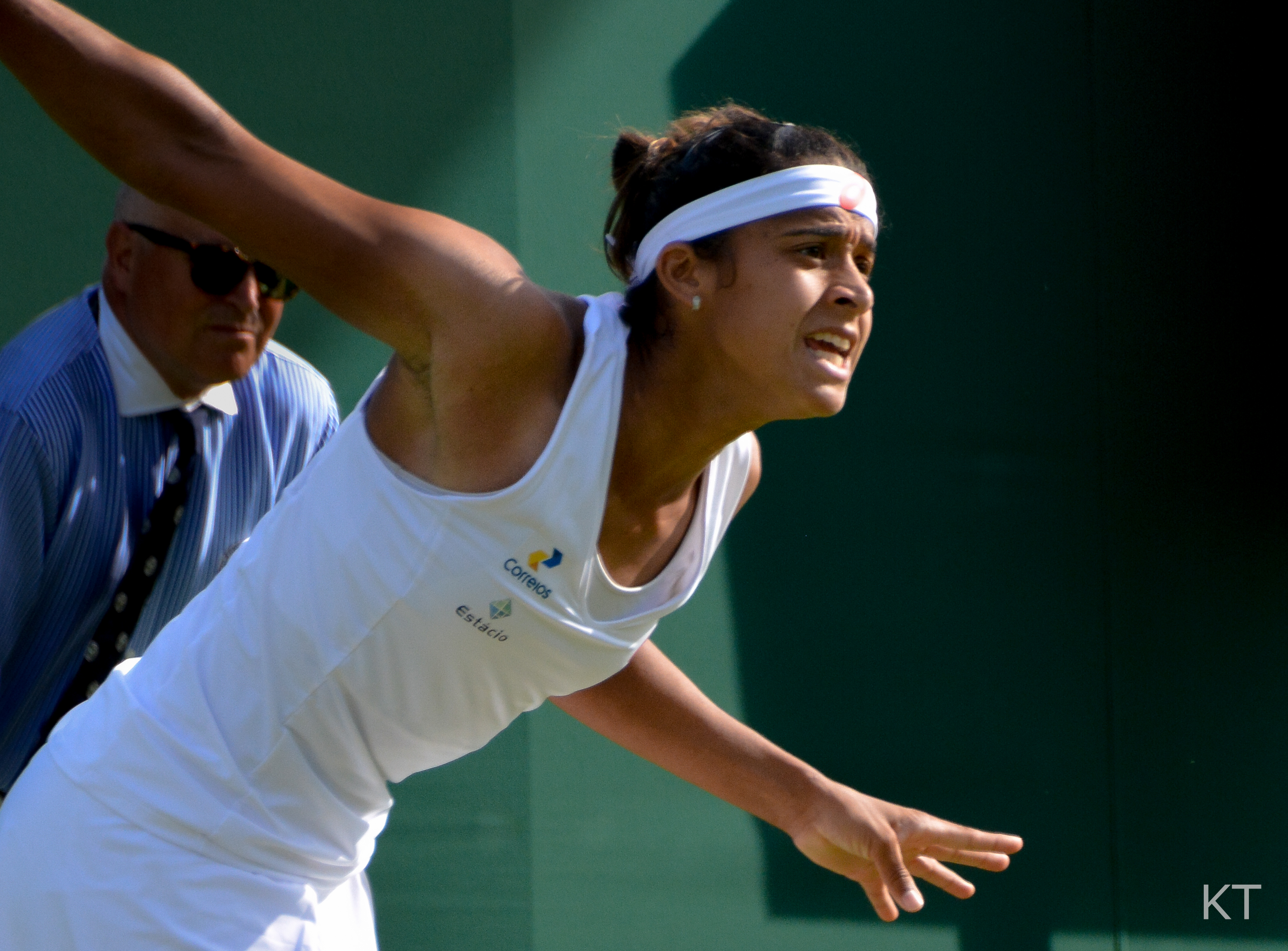
Pereira at the 2016 Wimbledon Championships.

== WTA Tour finals ==
=== Singles: 2 (2 titles) ===
Legend International	Finals by surface Clay (2–0)

Result	W–L	Date	Tournament	Tier	Surface	Opponent	Score
Win	1–0	Apr 2015	Copa Colsanitas, Colombia	International	Clay	(Kazakhstan) Yaroslava Shvedova	7–6^{(7–2)}, 6–1
Win	2–0	Aug 2015	Brasil Tennis Cup, Brazil	International	Clay	(Germany) Annika Beck	6–4, 4–6, 6–1

== WTA 125 finals ==
=== Doubles: 1 (runner-up) ===
Result	Date	Tournament	Surface	Partner	Opponents	Score
Loss	Feb 2013	Copa Bionaire, Colombia	Clay	(Argentina) Florencia Molinero	(Colombia) Catalina Castaño (Colombia) Mariana Duque Mariño	6–3, 1–6, [5–10]

== ITF Circuit finals ==
Legend
$100,000 tournaments
$50,000 tournaments
$25,000 tournaments
$10,000 tournaments

=== Singles: 31 (22 titles, 9 runner-ups) ===
Result	W–L	Date	Tournament	Tier	Surface	Opponent	Score
Win	1–0	Oct 2006	ITF Tucumán, Argentina	10,000	Clay	(Brazil) Vivian Segnini	6–2, 6–1
Loss	1–1	Oct 2006	ITF Córdoba, Argentina	10,000	Clay	(Argentina) Vanesa Furlanetto	6–1, 1–6, 5–7
Win	2–1	Oct 2006	ITF Santiago, Chile	10,000	Clay	(Argentina) Mailen Auroux	4–6, 6–2, 6–3
Win	3–1	Nov 2006	ITF Itajaí, Brazil	10,000	Clay	(Argentina) Veronica Spiegel	4–6, 6–1, 6–1
Loss	3–2	Nov 2006	ITF Córdoba, Argentina	10,000	Clay	(Belgium) Yanina Wickmayer	1–6, 7–6^{(4)}, 0–6
Win	4–2	Mar 2007	ITF Athens, Greece	10,000	Clay	(France) Violette Huck	6–2, 6–1
Win	5–2	Mar 2007	ITF Amiens, France	10,000	Clay (i)	(France) Audrey Bergot	7–5, 3–6, 6–1
Win	6–2	Mar 2007	ITF Foggia, Italy	10,000	Clay	(Spain) Rebeca Bou Nogueiro	6–4, 6–3
Loss	6–3	May 2007	ITF Vienna, Austria	10,000	Clay	(Croatia) Darija Jurak	1–6, 6–1, 2–6
Win	7–3	Aug 2007	ITF Campos do Jordão, Brazil	25,000	Hard	(Brazil) Maria Fernanda Alves	6–4, 6–2
Win	8–3	Aug 2007	ITF Bogotá, Colombia	25,000	Clay	(Portugal) Frederica Piedade	7–6^{(2)}, 6–2
Win	9–3	Dec 2008	ITF Buenos Aires, Argentina	10,000	Clay	(Argentina) Emilia Yorio	6–2, 6–1
Win	10–3	Oct 2010	ITF Arujá, Brazil	10,000	Clay	(Argentina) Vanesa Furlanetto	4–6, 6–4, 6–1
Win	11–3	Oct 2010	ITF Londrina, Brazil	10,000	Clay	(Paraguay) Verónica Cepede Royg	6–4, 6–0
Win	12–3	Mar 2011	ITF Metepec, Mexico	10,000	Hard	(United States) Amanda Fink	6–4, 6–4
Win	13–3	Jul 2011	ITF Denain, France	25,000	Clay	(Ukraine) Valentyna Ivakhnenko	6–4, 6–3
Loss	13–4	Apr 2012	ITF Caracas, Venezuela	25,000	Hard	(Venezuela) Adriana Pérez	1–6, 1–6
Win	14–4	May 2012	ITF Rosario, Argentina	25,000	Clay	(Argentina) Mailen Auroux	7–5, 7–6^{(5)}
Loss	14–5	Jun 2012	ITF Maribor, Slovenia	25,000	Clay	(Germany) Anna-Lena Friedsam	6–2, 6–7^{(1)}, 2–6
Loss	14–6	Sep 2012	ITF Mont-de-Marsan, France	25,000	Clay	(Switzerland) Timea Bacsinszky	2–6, 6–3, 2–6
Win	15–6	Oct 2012	ITF Seville, Spain	25,000	Clay	(Spain) Estrella Cabeza Candela	4–6, 7–6^{(3)}, 7–6^{(5)}
Win	16–6	Nov 2012	ITF Buenos Aires, Argentina	25,000	Clay	(United Kingdom) Amanda Carreras	6–1, 6–2
Win	17–6	Jun 2013	ITF Périgueux, France	25,000	Clay	(Chile) Daniela Seguel	6–1, 6–4
Win	18–6	Jul 2013	ITF Denain, France	25,000	Clay	(Italy) Alberta Brianti	6–4, 7–5
Win	19–6	Sep 2013	ITF Mont-de-Marsan, France	25,000	Clay	(France) Pauline Parmentier	6–1, 6–4
Win	20–6	Sep 2013	Open de Saint-Malo, France	25,000	Clay	(France) Pauline Parmentier	6–2, 6–1
Win	21–6	Sep 2013	ITF Seville, Spain	25,000	Clay	(Argentina) Florencia Molinero	7–6^{(5)}, 6–3
Loss	21–7	Jul 2014	Open de Biarritz, France	100,000	Clay	(Estonia) Kaia Kanepi	2–6, 4–6
Loss	21–8	Sep 2014	ITF Alphen aan den Rijn, Netherlands	25,000	Clay	(Czech Republic) Denisa Allertová	3–6, ret.
Win	22–8	Apr 2015	Open Medellín, Colombia	50,000	Clay	(Paraguay) Verónica Cepede Royg	7–6^{(6)}, 6–1
Loss	22–9	Oct 2019	ITF Pula, Italy	25,000	Clay	(Croatia) Tena Lukas	4–6, 3–6

=== Doubles: 22 (10 titles, 12 runner-ups) ===
Result	W–L	Date	Tournament	Tier	Surface	Partnering	Opponents	Score
Win	1–0	Nov 2006	ITF Itajaí, Brazil	10,000	Clay	(Belgium) Yanina Wickmayer	(Brazil) Fernanda Hermenegildo (Slovakia) Monika Kochanová	6–3, 6–3
Win	2–0	Nov 2006	ITF Córdoba, Argentina	10,000	Clay	(Belgium) Yanina Wickmayer	(Argentina) Florencia Molinero (Argentina) Veronica Spiegel	7–5, 6–4
Win	3–0	Mar 2007	ITF Amiens, France	10,000	Clay (i)	(Netherlands) Marcella Koek	(Poland) Monika Krauze (Russia) Anna Savitskaya	6–1, 6–0
Win	4–0	May 2007	ITF Vienna, Austria	10,000	Clay	(Austria) Nikola Hofmanova	(Slovakia) Katarína Poljaková (Slovakia) Zuzana Zlochová	7–6^{(1)}, 6–3
Loss	4–1	Jul 2007	ITF Mont-de-Marsan, France	25,000	Clay	(Brazil) Joana Cortez	(Russia) Nina Bratchikova (Portugal) Neuza Silva	3–6, 6–7^{(3)}
Loss	4–2	Aug 2007	ITF Bogotá, Colombia	25,000	Clay	(Brazil) Ana Clara Duarte	(Brazil) Joana Cortez (Brazil) Roxane Vaisemberg	7–5, 4–6, 4–6
Loss	4–3	Sep 2007	ITF Sofia, Bulgaria	25,000	Clay	(Brazil) Joana Cortez	(Romania) Mihaela Buzărnescu (Poland) Magdalena Kiszczyńska	4–6, 7–6^{(2)}, [4–10]
Loss	4–4	Nov 2007	ITF Jounieh Open, Lebanon	25,000	Clay	(Italy) Nicole Clerico	(Poland) Olga Brózda (Russia) Maria Kondratieva	3–6, 1–6
Win	5–4	Nov 2007	ITF Sintra, Portugal	25,000	Clay (i)	(Italy) Nicole Clerico	(Brazil) Joana Cortez (Brazil) Roxane Vaisemberg	6–4, 6–2
Win	6–4	Nov 2008	ITF Buenos Aires, Argentina	10,000	Clay	(Brazil) Fernanda Hermenegildo	(Argentina) Tatiana Búa (Argentina) María Irigoyen	6–3, 6–2
Loss	6–5	Mar 2011	ITF Poza Rica, Mexico	10,000	Hard	(Brazil) Fernanda Hermenegildo	(United States) Macall Harkins (Austria) Nicole Rottmann	2–6, 4–6
Win	7–5	Jul 2011	ITF Denain, France	25,000	Clay	(Paraguay) Verónica Cepede Royg	(France) Céline Ghesquière (France) Elixane Lechemia	6–1, 6–1
Win	8–5	Jul 2011	ITF Campos do Jordão, Brazil	25,000	Hard	(Brazil) Fernanda Hermenegildo	(Brazil) Maria Fernanda Alves (Brazil) Roxane Vaisemberg	3–6, 7–6^{(5)}, [11–9]
Loss	8–6	Dec 2011	ITF Buenos Aires, Argentina	25,000	Clay	(Brazil) Vivian Segnini	(Argentina) Mailen Auroux (Argentina) María Irigoyen	1–6, 3–6
Win	9–6	Apr 2012	ITF Pomezia, Italy	10,000	Clay	(Peru) Bianca Botto	(Italy) Benedetta Davato (Germany) Anne Schäfer	7–6^{(3)}, 6–2
Win	10–6	May 2012	ITF Rosario, Argentina	25,000	Clay	(Austria) Nicole Rottmann	(Paraguay) Verónica Cepede Royg (Argentina) Luciana Sarmenti	6–2, 7–5
Loss	10–7	Jun 2012	ITF Zlín, Czech Republic	25,000	Clay	(Paraguay) Verónica Cepede Royg	(Bulgaria) Elitsa Kostova (Bosnia and Herzegovina) Jasmina Tinjić	6–4, 1–6, [8–10]
Loss	10–8	Sep 2012	ITF Mont-de-Marsan, France	25,000	Clay	(Bulgaria) Aleksandrina Naydenova	(Switzerland) Timea Bacsinszky (Romania) Mihaela Buzărnescu	4–6, 1–6
Loss	10–9	Sep 2012	Open de Saint-Malo, France	25,000	Clay	(Bulgaria) Aleksandrina Naydenova	(Turkey) Pemra Özgen (Ukraine) Alyona Sotnikova	4–6, 6–7^{(6)}
Loss	10–10	Oct 2012	ITF Seville, Spain	25,000	Clay	(Bulgaria) Aleksandrina Naydenova	(Poland) Paula Kania (Poland) Katarzyna Piter	7–5, 4–6, [6–10]
Loss	10–11	May 2013	Open de Cagnes-sur-Mer, France	100,000	Clay	(Colombia) Catalina Castaño	(United States) Vania King (Netherlands) Arantxa Rus	6–4, 5–7, [8–10]
Loss	10–12	Jul 2014	Open de Biarritz, France	100,000	Clay	(Spain) Lourdes Domínguez Lino	(Argentina) Florencia Molinero (Liechtenstein) Stephanie Vogt	2–6, 2–6

== Record against top-10 players ==
Ranked top 10 at some point in their career (but not necessarily when they faced Pereira)

Player	Record	Win%	Hard	Clay	Grass	Last match
Number 1 ranked players						
(Serbia) Ana Ivanovic	0–1	0%	0–1	0–0	0–0	Lost (3–6, 0–6) at 2016 Miami
(United States) Serena Williams	0–1	0%	0–0	0–1	0–0	Lost (2–6, 1–6) at 2016 Roland Garros
(Czech Republic) Karolína Plíšková	0–2	0%	0–0	0–1	0–1	Lost (5–7, 7–6^{(7–5)}, 3–6) at 2014 Eastbourne
(Romania) Simona Halep	0–1	0%	0–0	0–0	0–1	Lost (2–6, 2–6) at 2014 Wimbledon
Number 4 ranked players						
(Italy) Francesca Schiavone	1–0	100%	0–0	1–0	0–0	Won (6–1, 6–4) at 2015 Bogotá
(Switzerland) Belinda Bencic	1–0	100%	0–0	1–0	0–0	Won (6–3, 6–4) at 2014 Fed Cup
Number 5 ranked players						
(Canada) Eugenie Bouchard	0–1	0%	0–1	0–0	0–0	Lost (6–4, 3–6, 2–6) at 2013 Australian Open
(Slovakia) Daniela Hantuchová	0–1	0%	0–0	0–1	0–0	Lost (2–6, 3–6) at 2014 Charleston
(Italy) Sara Errani	0–1	0%	0–0	0–1	0–0	Lost (3–6, 3–6) at 2015 Rio Open
Number 6 ranked players						
(Italy) Flavia Pennetta	0–1	0%	0–1	0–0	0–0	Lost (6–3, 0–6, 4–6) at 2015 Beijing
(Spain) Carla Suárez Navarro	1–2	33%	1–2	0–1	0–0	Lost (0–6, 0–6) at 2016 US Open
Number 8 ranked players						
(Russia) Ekaterina Makarova	0–2	0%	0–1	0–1	0–0	Lost (3–6, 3–6) at 2015 US Open
Number 9 ranked players						
(Germany) Andrea Petkovic	0–1	0%	0–1	0–0	0–0	Lost (1–6, 2–6) at 2016 Brisbane
(Switzerland) Timea Bacsinszky	2–2	50%	0–0	2–2	0–0	Lost (3–6, 3–6) at 2014 Fed Cup
