= 2023 WTA Elite Trophy – Doubles =

Doubles
- 2023 WTA Elite Trophy

Final
- Champions: (Brazil) Beatriz Haddad Maia; Veronika Kudermetova
- Runners-up: (Japan) Miyu Kato (Indonesia) Aldila Sutjiadi
- Score: 6–3, 6–3

Events
Singles	Doubles
- WTA Elite Trophy

Beatriz Haddad Maia and Veronika Kudermetova defeated Miyu Kato and Aldila Sutjiadi in the final, 6–3, 6–3 to win the doubles tennis title at the 2023 WTA Elite Trophy. The pair did not drop a set en route to the title, and Haddad Maia did not drop a set at the entire event (also being the champion in the singles).

Lyudmyla Kichenok and Andreja Klepač were the reigning champions from when the event was last held in 2019, but only Kichenok qualified to play this year. She partnered Ulrikke Eikeri, but the team was eliminated in the round-robin competition.

== Players ==
1. (Brazil) Beatriz Haddad Maia / Veronika Kudermetova (champions)
2. (Japan) Miyu Kato / (Indonesia) Aldila Sutjiadi (final)
3. (Norway) Ulrikke Eikeri / (Ukraine) Lyudmyla Kichenok (round robin)
4. (Georgia (country)) Oksana Kalashnikova / Yana Sizikova (round robin)
5. (China) Wang Xiyu / (China) Xu Yifan (round robin)
6. (China) Jiang Xinyu / (China) Tang Qianhui (round robin)

== Draw ==
Key

- Q = Qualifier
- WC = Wild card
- LL = Lucky loser
- Alt = Alternate
- ITF = ITF entry
- PR = Protected ranking
- SR = Special ranking
- SE = Special exempt
- JE = Junior exempt
- JR = Junior Accelerator Programme entrant
- CO = College Accelerator Programme entrant
- NG = Next Gen Accelerator Program entrant
- w/o = Walkover
- r = Retired
- d = Defaulted

=== Final ===
Final
1	(Brazil) Beatriz Haddad Maia; Veronika Kudermetova	6	6
2	(Japan) Miyu Kato (Indonesia) Aldila Sutjiadi	3	3

=== Lily Group ===
		(Brazil) Haddad Maia; Kudermetova	(Georgia (country)) Kalashnikova; Sizikova	(China) Jiang (China) Tang	RR; W–L	Set; W–L	Game; W–L	Standings
1	(Brazil) Beatriz Haddad Maia; Veronika Kudermetova		6–0, 6–3	6–3, 6–3	2–0	4–0 (100%)	24–9 (73%)	1
4	(Georgia (country)) Oksana Kalashnikova; Yana Sizikova	0–6, 3–6		4–6, 6–7^{(4–7)}	0–2	0–4 (0%)	13–25 (34%)	3
6/WC	(China) Jiang Xinyu (China) Tang Qianhui	3–6, 3–6	6–4, 7–6^{(7–4)}		1–1	2–2 (50%)	19–22 (46%)	2

=== Bougainvillea Group ===
		(Japan) Kato (Indonesia) Sutjiadi	(Norway) Eikeri (Ukraine) Kichenok	(China) Wang (China) Xu	RR; W–L	Set; W–L	Game; W–L	Standings
2	(Japan) Miyu Kato (Indonesia) Aldila Sutjiadi		6–3, 6–7^{(5–7)}, [10–6]	4–6, 7–5, [12–10]	2–0	4–2 (67%)	25–21 (54%)	1
3	(Norway) Ulrikke Eikeri (Ukraine) Lyudmyla Kichenok	3–6, 7–6^{(7–5)}, [6–10]		3–6, 2–6	0–2	1–4 (20%)	15–25 (38%)	3
5/WC	(China) Wang Xiyu (China) Xu Yifan	6–4, 5–7, [10–12]	6–3, 6–2		1–1	3–2 (60%)	23–17 (58%)	2
