= 2018 Fed Cup Asia/Oceania Zone Group I – Pool B =

Subsection of tennis competition

Pool B of the 2018 Fed Cup Asia/Oceania Zone Group I was one of two pools in the Asia/Oceania zone of the 2018 Fed Cup. Four teams competed in a round robin competition, with the top team and the bottom team proceeding to their respective sections of the play-offs: the top team played for advancement to the World Group II Play-offs, while the bottom team faced potential relegation to Group II.

== Standings ==
		JPN	KOR	THA	TPE	RR; W–L	Set; W–L	Game; W–L	Standings
3	Japan		3–0	3–0	3–0	3–0	18–2 (90%)	118–63 (65%)	1
8	South Korea	0–3		2–1	3–0	2–1	12–10 (55%)	104–94 (53%)	2
5	Thailand	0–3	1–2		2–1	1–2	10–13 (43%)	99–113 (47%)	3
2	Chinese Taipei	0–3	0–3	1–2		0–3	2–17 (11%)	61–112 (35%)	4

Standings are determined by: 1. number of wins; 2. number of matches; 3. in two-team ties, head-to-head records; 4. in three-team ties, (a) percentage of sets won (head-to-head records if two teams remain tied), then (b) percentage of games won (head-to-head records if two teams remain tied), then (c) Fed Cup rankings.

== Round-robin ==
=== Chinese Taipei vs. South Korea ===
Chinese Taipei
0
R.K. Khanna Tennis Complex, New Delhi, India
7 February
Hard

South Korea
3

			1	2	3
1	(Chinese Taipei) (South Korea)	Lee Ya-hsuan; Jeong Su-nam	3; 6	3; 6
2	(Chinese Taipei) (South Korea)	Hsu Chieh-yu; Han Na-lae	2; 6	3; 6
3	(Chinese Taipei) (South Korea)	Hsu Ching-wen / Lee Pei-chi; Kim Na-ri / Lee So-ra	2; 6	3; 6

=== Japan vs. Thailand ===
Japan
3
R.K. Khanna Tennis Complex, New Delhi, India
7 February
Hard

Thailand
0

			1	2	3
1	(Japan) (Thailand)	Kurumi Nara; Peangtarn Plipuech	6; 0	6; 2
2	(Japan) (Thailand)	Nao Hibino; Luksika Kumkhum	5; 7	7^{7} 6^{5}	6; 0
3	(Japan) (Thailand)	Miyu Kato / Makoto Ninomiya; Nicha Lertpitaksinchai / Peangtarn Plipuech	6; 3	6; 3

=== Chinese Taipei vs. Thailand ===
Chinese Taipei
1
R.K. Khanna Tennis Complex, New Delhi, India
8 February
Hard

Thailand
2

			1	2	3
1	(Chinese Taipei) (Thailand)	Lee Pei-chi; Patcharin Cheapchandej	4; 6	6; 4	6; 3
2	(Chinese Taipei) (Thailand)	Hsu Chieh-yu; Luksika Kumkhum	0; 6	1; 6
3	(Chinese Taipei) (Thailand)	Hsu Ching-wen / Lee Pei-chi; Luksika Kumkhum / Peangtarn Plipuech	5; 7	2; 6

=== Japan vs. South Korea ===
Japan
3
R.K. Khanna Tennis Complex, New Delhi, India
8 February
Hard

South Korea
0

			1	2	3
1	(Japan) (South Korea)	Kurumi Nara; Jeong Su-nam	6; 3	6; 0
2	(Japan) (South Korea)	Nao Hibino; Han Na-lae	1; 6	7^{7} 6^{2}	6; 2
3	(Japan) (South Korea)	Miyu Kato / Makoto Ninomiya; Kim Na-ri / Lee So-ra	6; 2	6; 2

=== Chinese Taipei vs. Japan ===
Chinese Taipei
0
R.K. Khanna Tennis Complex, New Delhi, India
9 February
Hard

Japan
3

			1	2	3
1	(Chinese Taipei) (Japan)	Hsu Ching-wen; Miyu Kato	2; 6	1; 6
2	(Chinese Taipei) (Japan)	Hsu Chieh-yu; Nao Hibino	6^{8} 7^{10}	4; 6
3	(Chinese Taipei) (Japan)	Hsu Ching-wen / Lee Ya-hsuan; Miyu Kato / Makoto Ninomiya	2; 6	6^{1} 7^{7}

=== Thailand vs. South Korea ===
Thailand
1
R.K. Khanna Tennis Complex, New Delhi, India
9 February
Hard

South Korea
2

			1	2	3
1	(Thailand) (South Korea)	Nicha Lertpitaksinchai; Jeong Su-nam	7^{7} 6^{5}	2; 6	0; 6
2	(Thailand) (South Korea)	Luksika Kumkhum; Han Na-lae	6; 0	2; 6	7; 5
3	(Thailand) (South Korea)	Luksika Kumkhum / Peangtarn Plipuech; Han Na-lae / Kim Na-ri	7; 5	6^{3} 7^{7}	3; 6
