= 2023 WTA Elite Trophy – Singles =

Singles
- 2023 WTA Elite Trophy

Final
- Champion: (Brazil) Beatriz Haddad Maia
- Runner-up: (China) Zheng Qinwen
- Score: 7–6^{(13–11)}, 7–6^{(7–4)}

Events
Singles	Doubles
- WTA Elite Trophy

Beatriz Haddad Maia defeated Zheng Qinwen in the final, 7–6^{(13–11)}, 7–6^{(7–4)} to win the singles tennis title at the 2023 WTA Elite Trophy. Haddad Maia did not drop a set en route to her first Elite Trophy title.

Aryna Sabalenka was the reigning champion from when the tournament was last held in 2019, but she qualified to play in the 2023 WTA Finals.

== Players ==
1. (Czech Republic) Barbora Krejčíková (round robin)
2. (United States) Madison Keys (round robin)
3. (Latvia) Jeļena Ostapenko (round robin)
4. Liudmila Samsonova (round robin)
5. Veronika Kudermetova (round robin)
6. Daria Kasatkina (semifinals)
7. (China) Zheng Qinwen (final)
8. (Brazil) Beatriz Haddad Maia (champion)
9. (France) Caroline Garcia (round robin)
10. (Croatia) Donna Vekić (round robin)
11. (Poland) Magda Linette (round robin)
12. (China) Zhu Lin (semifinals)

== Alternates ==
1. (Romania) Sorana Cîrstea (Did not play)
2. Anastasia Potapova (Did not play)

== Draw ==
Key

- Q = Qualifier
- WC = Wild card
- LL = Lucky loser
- Alt = Alternate
- ITF = ITF entry
- PR = Protected ranking
- SR = Special ranking
- SE = Special exempt
- JE = Junior exempt
- JR = Junior Accelerator Programme entrant
- CO = College Accelerator Programme entrant
- NG = Next Gen Accelerator Program entrant
- w/o = Walkover
- r = Retired
- d = Defaulted

=== Finals ===
Semifinals
6	Daria Kasatkina	4	1
8	(Brazil) Beatriz Haddad Maia	6	6
12/WC	(China) Zhu Lin	5	6	1
7	(China) Zheng Qinwen	7	4	6

Final
8	(Brazil) Beatriz Haddad Maia	7^{13}	7^{7}
7	(China) Zheng Qinwen	6^{11}	6^{4}

=== Azalea Group ===
		(Czech Republic) Krejčíková	Kasatkina	(Poland) Linette	RR; W–L	Set; W–L	Game; W–L	Standings
1	(Czech Republic) Barbora Krejčíková		5–7, 6–1, 1–6	6–2, 6–4	1–1	3–2 (60%)	24–20 (55%)	2
6	Daria Kasatkina	7–5, 1–6, 6–1		6–3, 6–4	2–0	4–1 (80%)	26–19 (58%)	1
11	(Poland) Magda Linette	2–6, 4–6	3–6, 4–6		0–2	0–4 (0%)	13–24 (35%)	3

=== Camellia Group ===
		(United States) Keys	(Brazil) Haddad Maia	(France) Garcia	RR; W–L	Set; W–L	Game; W–L	Standings
2	(United States) Madison Keys		4–6, 4–6	3–6, 6–7^{(3–7)}	0–2	0–4 (0%)	17–25 (40%)	3
8	(Brazil) Beatriz Haddad Maia	6–4, 6–4		6–1, 7–6^{(7–4)}	2–0	4–0 (100%)	25–15 (63%)	1
9	(France) Caroline Garcia	6–3, 7–6^{(7–3)}	1–6, 6–7^{(4–7)}		1–1	2–2 (50%)	20–22 (48%)	2

=== Orchid Group ===
		(Latvia) Ostapenko	(China) Zheng	(Croatia) Vekić	RR; W–L	Set; W–L	Game; W–L	Standings
3	(Latvia) Jeļena Ostapenko		4–6, 6–1, 2–6	4–6, 6–4, 6–1	1–1	3–3 (50%)	28–24 (54%)	2
7	(China) Zheng Qinwen	6–4, 1–6, 6–2		6–4, 6–7^{(6–8)}, 6–4	2–0	4–2 (67%)	31–27 (53%)	1
10	(Croatia) Donna Vekić	6–4, 4–6, 1–6	4–6, 7–6^{(8–6)}, 4–6		0–2	2–4 (33%)	26–34 (43%)	3

=== Rose Group ===
		Samsonova	Kudermetova	(China) Zhu	RR; W–L	Set; W–L	Game; W–L	Standings
4	Liudmila Samsonova		4–6, 6–3, 5–7	2–6, 6–2, 6–1	1–1	3–3 (50%)	29–25 (54%)	2
5	Veronika Kudermetova	6–4, 3–6, 7–5		6–7^{(5–7)}, 1–6	1–1	2–3 (40%)	23–28 (45%)	3
12/WC	(China) Zhu Lin	6–2, 2–6, 1–6	7–6^{(7–5)}, 6–1		1–1	3–2 (60%)	22–21 (51%)	1
