= 2018 Fed Cup Asia/Oceania Zone Group I – Pool A =

Subsection of tennis competition

Pool A of the 2018 Fed Cup Asia/Oceania Zone Group I was one of two pools in the Asia/Oceania zone of the 2018 Fed Cup. Four teams competed in a round robin competition, with the top team and the bottom team proceeding to their respective sections of the play-offs: the top team played for advancement to the World Group II Play-offs, while the bottom team faced potential relegation to Group II.

== Standings ==
		KAZ	CHN	IND	HKG	RR; W–L	Set; W–L	Game; W–L	Standings
1	Kazakhstan		3–0	2–1	3–0	3–0	17–3 (85%)	114–49 (70%)	1
4	China	0–3		2–1	2–1	2–1	9–10 (47%)	79–83 (49%)	2
6	India	1–2	1–2		3–0	1–2	10–9 (53%)	82–85 (49%)	3
7	Hong Kong	0–3	1–2	0–3		0–3	2–16 (11%)	45–103 (30%)	4

Standings are determined by: 1. number of wins; 2. number of matches; 3. in two-team ties, head-to-head records; 4. in three-team ties, (a) percentage of sets won (head-to-head records if two teams remain tied), then (b) percentage of games won (head-to-head records if two teams remain tied), then (c) Fed Cup rankings.

== Round-robin ==
=== Kazakhstan vs. Hong Kong ===
Kazakhstan
3
R.K. Khanna Tennis Complex, New Delhi, India
7 February
Hard

Hong Kong
0

			1	2	3
1	(Kazakhstan) (Hong Kong)	Zarina Diyas; Wu Ho-ching	6; 3	6; 1
2	(Kazakhstan) (Hong Kong)	Yulia Putintseva; Ng Kwan-yau	6; 1	6; 0
3	(Kazakhstan) (Hong Kong)	Zarina Diyas / Yulia Putintseva; Eudice Chong / Zhang Ling	6; 1	6; 3

=== China vs. India ===
China
2
R.K. Khanna Tennis Complex, New Delhi, India
7 February
Hard

India
1

			1	2	3
1	(China) (India)	Wang Yafan; Karman Thandi	6; 2	6; 2
2	(China) (India)	Zhu Lin; Ankita Raina	3; 6	2; 6
3	(China) (India)	Wang Yafan / Yang Zhaoxuan; Ankita Raina / Prarthana Thombare	6; 2	7^{7} 6^{1}

=== Kazakhstan vs. India ===
Kazakhstan
2
R.K. Khanna Tennis Complex, New Delhi, India
8 February
Hard

India
1

			1	2	3
1	(Kazakhstan) (India)	Zarina Diyas; Karman Thandi	6; 3	6; 2
2	(Kazakhstan) (India)	Yulia Putintseva; Ankita Raina	3; 6	6; 1	4; 6
3	(Kazakhstan) (India)	Zarina Diyas / Yulia Putintseva; Ankita Raina / Prarthana Thombare	6; 0	6; 4

=== China vs. Hong Kong ===
China
2
R.K. Khanna Tennis Complex, New Delhi, India
8 February
Hard

Hong Kong
1

			1	2	3
1	(China) (Hong Kong)	Wang Yafan; Eudice Chong	6; 3	6; 2
2	(China) (Hong Kong)	Zhu Lin; Zhang Ling	3; 6	4; 6
3	(China) (Hong Kong)	Wang Yafan / Yang Zhaoxuan; Eudice Chong / Zhang Ling	6; 1	6; 0

=== Kazakhstan vs. China ===
Kazakhstan
3
R.K. Khanna Tennis Complex, New Delhi, India
9 February
Hard

China
0

			1	2	3
1	(Kazakhstan) (China)	Zarina Diyas; Yang Zhaoxuan	7; 5	6; 2
2	(Kazakhstan) (China)	Yulia Putintseva; Wang Yafan	6; 4	4; 6	6; 1
3	(Kazakhstan) (China)	Gozal Ainitdinova / Zhibek Kulambayeva; Wang Yafan / Yang Zhaoxuan				w/o

=== India vs. Hong Kong ===
India
3
R.K. Khanna Tennis Complex, New Delhi, India
9 February
Hard

Hong Kong
0

			1	2	3
1	(India) (Hong Kong)	Karman Thandi; Eudice Chong	6; 3	6; 4
2	(India) (Hong Kong)	Ankita Raina; Zhang Ling	6; 3	6; 2
3	(India) (Hong Kong)	Prarthana Thombare / Pranjala Yadlapalli; Ng Kwan-yau / Wu Ho-ching	6; 2	6; 4
