= 2018 Fed Cup World Group II play-offs =

Part of tennis tournament

The 2018 World Group II play-offs are four ties which involves the losing nations of the World Group II and four nations from the three Zonal Group I competitions. Nations that win their play-off ties enter the 2019 World Group II, while losing nations join their respective zonal groups.

Participating Teams
| Canada | Great Britain | Japan | Latvia |
| Paraguay | Russia | Spain | Ukraine |

== Russia vs. Latvia ==
Russia
2
Tennis Development Center, Khanty-Mansiysk, Russia
21–22 April
Clay (indoor)

Latvia
3

| | | | 1 | 2 | 3 |
|---|---|---|---|---|---|
| 1 | (Russia) (Latvia) | Anastasia Pavlyuchenkova; Anastasija Sevastova | 6; 3 | 2; 6 | 6; 4 |
| 2 | (Russia) (Latvia) | Ekaterina Makarova; Jeļena Ostapenko | 5; 7 | 4; 6 |
| 3 | (Russia) (Latvia) | Anastasia Pavlyuchenkova; Jeļena Ostapenko | 5; 7 | 1; 6 |
| 4 | (Russia) (Latvia) | Ekaterina Makarova; Anastasija Sevastova | 2; 6 | 5; 7 |
| 5 | (Russia) (Latvia) | Elena Vesnina / Natalia Vikhlyantseva; Diāna Marcinkēviča / Daniela Vismane | 6; 4 | 6; 2 |

== Spain vs. Paraguay ==
Spain
3
La Manga Club, Cartagena, Spain
21–22 April
Clay

Paraguay
1

| | | | 1 | 2 | 3 |
|---|---|---|---|---|---|---|
| 1 | (Spain) (Paraguay) | Carla Suárez Navarro; Verónica Cepede Royg | 6; 2 | 6; 2 |
| 2 | (Spain) (Paraguay) | Garbiñe Muguruza; Montserrat González | 6; 4 | 5; 7 | 6; 4 |
| 3 | (Spain) (Paraguay) | Garbiñe Muguruza; Verónica Cepede Royg | 7^{7} 6^{2} | 6; 0 |
| 4 | (Spain) (Paraguay) | Carla Suárez Navarro; Montserrat González | | | | not played |
| 5 | (Spain) (Paraguay) | Georgina García Pérez / María José Martínez Sánchez; Verónica Cepede Royg / Montserrat González | 3; 6 | 2; 6 |

== Canada vs. Ukraine ==
Canada
3
IGA Stadium, Montreal, Canada
21–22 April
Hard (indoor)

Ukraine
2

| | | | 1 | 2 | 3 |
|---|---|---|---|---|---|---|
| 1 | (Canada) (Ukraine) | Bianca Andreescu; Lesia Tsurenko | 6; 4 | 3; 6 | 0; 4 | retired |
| 2 | (Canada) (Ukraine) | Eugenie Bouchard; Kateryna Bondarenko | 6; 2 | 7; 5 |
| 3 | (Canada) (Ukraine) | Eugenie Bouchard; Lesia Tsurenko | 4; 6 | 6; 2 | 7^{7} 6^{5} |
| 4 | (Canada) (Ukraine) | Gabriela Dabrowski; Kateryna Bondarenko | 6; 3 | 2; 6 | 1; 6 |
| 5 | (Canada) (Ukraine) | Bianca Andreescu / Gabriela Dabrowski; Kateryna Bondarenko / Olga Savchuk | 6; 3 | 4; 6 | 6; 3 |

== Japan vs. Great Britain ==
Japan
3
Bourbon Beans Dome, Miki, Japan
21–22 April
Hard (indoor)

Great Britain
2

| | | | 1 | 2 | 3 |
|---|---|---|---|---|---|
| 1 | (Japan) (United Kingdom) | Naomi Osaka; Heather Watson | 6; 2 | 6; 3 |
| 2 | (Japan) (United Kingdom) | Kurumi Nara; Johanna Konta | 4; 6 | 2; 6 |
| 3 | (Japan) (United Kingdom) | Naomi Osaka; Johanna Konta | 3; 6 | 3; 6 |
| 4 | (Japan) (United Kingdom) | Kurumi Nara; Heather Watson | 7^{9} 6^{7} | 6; 4 |
| 5 | (Japan) (United Kingdom) | Miyu Kato / Makoto Ninomiya; Johanna Konta / Heather Watson | 3; 6 | 6; 3 | 6; 3 |
