= Tennis at the 2018 South American Games – Women's singles =

Women's singles
- Tennis at the 2018 South American Games

Events
Singles	men	women
Doubles	men	women	mixed
- South American Games

The women's singles event at the 2018 South American Games was held from 28 May to 2 June.

== Medalists ==
Gold	Silver	Bronze
Montserrat González; Paraguay	Daniela Seguel; Chile	Fernanda Brito; Chile

== Draw ==
Key

- Q = Qualifier
- WC = Wild card
- LL = Lucky loser
- Alt = Alternate
- ITF = ITF entry
- PR = Protected ranking
- SR = Special ranking
- SE = Special exempt
- JE = Junior exempt
- JR = Junior Accelerator Programme entrant
- CO = College Accelerator Programme entrant
- NG = Next Gen Accelerator Program entrant
- w/o = Walkover
- r = Retired
- d = Defaulted

=== Final four ===
Semifinals
1	(Chile) Daniela Seguel	6	6
3	(Colombia) María Herazo González	2	4
4	(Chile) Fernanda Brito	5	4
2	(Paraguay) Montserrat González	7	6

Final
1	(Chile) Daniela Seguel	6	5	3
2	(Paraguay) Montserrat González	4	7	6
Bronze medal match
3	(Colombia) María Herazo González	6	0	[8]
4	(Chile) Fernanda Brito	3	4	[10]

=== Top half ===
Round 1
(Uruguay) F Secinaro	2	3
(Peru) D Schaefer	6	6
(Colombia) PA Pérez	6	6
(Uruguay) I Tiscornia	1	0
(Peru) A Iamachkine	5	6^{1}
7	(Bolivia) N Zeballos	7	7^{7}
(Bolivia) P Cortez Vargas	2	6	4
(Colombia) J Valero	6	3	6
(Argentina) E Ganga	6^{4}	5
(Ecuador) C Romero	7^{7}	7

Round 2
1	(Chile) D Seguel	6	6
(Peru) D Schaefer	0	1
(Colombia) PA Pérez	4	4
7	(Bolivia) N Zeballos	6	6
3	(Colombia) M Herazo	6	6
(Colombia) J Valero	2	1
(Ecuador) C Romero	4	1
5	(Paraguay) C Giangreco Campiz	6	6

Quarterfinals
1	(Chile) D Seguel	6	6
7	(Bolivia) N Zeballos	0	2
3	(Colombia) M Herazo	3	6	6
5	(Paraguay) C Giangreco Campiz	6	1	3

Semifinals
1	(Chile) D Seguel	6	6
3	(Colombia) M Herazo	2	4

=== Bottom half ===
Round 1
8	(Argentina) M Krywoj	6	6
(Suriname) A Ma-Ajong	1	0
(Argentina) J Ortenzi	4	2
(Ecuador) C Römer	6	6
(Venezuela) M Linares	7	6
(Peru) C Soares	5	3
(Paraguay) L Escauriza	5	6	6^{4}
(Ecuador) M Reasco	7	2	7^{7}
(Bolivia) H Birnbaumer	0	4
(Venezuela) D Ramírez	6	6

Round 2
8	(Argentina) M Krywoj	7	4	6
(Ecuador) C Römer	5	6	2
(Venezuela) M Linares	4	1
4	(Chile) F Brito	6	6
6	(Venezuela) A Uzcátegui	6	6^{5}	6
(Ecuador) M Reasco	2	7^{7}	0
(Venezuela) D Ramírez	3	4
2	(Paraguay) M González	6	6

Quarterfinals
8	(Argentina) M Krywoj	2	4
4	(Chile) F Brito	6	6
6	(Venezuela) A Uzcátegui	5	7	2
2	(Paraguay) M González	7	5	6

Semifinals
4	(Chile) F Brito	5	4
2	(Paraguay) M González	7	6
