= Tennis at the 2018 South American Games – Women's doubles =

Women's doubles
- Tennis at the 2018 South American Games

Events
Singles	men	women
Doubles	men	women	mixed
- South American Games

The women's doubles event at the 2018 South American Games was held from 29 May to 2 June.

== Medalists ==
Gold	Silver	Bronze
Alexa Guarachi; Daniela Seguel; Chile	Camila Giangreco; Montserrat González; Paraguay	Camila Romero; Charlotte Römer; Ecuador

== Draw ==
Key

- Q = Qualifier
- WC = Wild card
- LL = Lucky loser
- Alt = Alternate
- ITF = ITF entry
- PR = Protected ranking
- SR = Special ranking
- SE = Special exempt
- JE = Junior exempt
- JR = Junior Accelerator Programme entrant
- CO = College Accelerator Programme entrant
- NG = Next Gen Accelerator Program entrant
- w/o = Walkover
- r = Retired
- d = Defaulted

1st round
(Bolivia) H Birnbaumer (Bolivia) P Cortez Vargas	3	0
(Venezuela) M Linares (Venezuela) D Ramírez	6	6

2nd round
1	(Chile) A Guarachi (Chile) D Seguel	6	7^{7}
(Peru) A Iamachkine (Peru) D Schaefer	1	6^{4}
3	(Colombia) M Herazo (Colombia) J Valero	7^{7}	6
(Venezuela) M Linares (Venezuela) D Ramírez	6^{4}	4
(Argentina) J Ortenzi (Argentina) E Ganga	2	7^{7}	[3]
4	(Ecuador) C Romero (Ecuador) C Römer	6	6^{5}	[10]
(Uruguay) I Tiscornia (Uruguay) M Secinaro	2	0
2	(Paraguay) C Giangreco Campiz (Paraguay) M González	6	6

Semifinals
1	(Chile) A Guarachi (Chile) D Seguel	7	6
3	(Colombia) M Herazo (Colombia) J Valero	5	2
4	(Ecuador) C Romero (Ecuador) C Römer	0	1
2	(Paraguay) C Giangreco Campiz (Paraguay) M González	6	6

Finals
1	(Chile) A Guarachi (Chile) D Seguel	6	6
2	(Paraguay) C Giangreco Campiz (Paraguay) M González	1	1
Third place
3	(Colombia) M Herazo (Colombia) J Valero	4	1	[8]
4	(Ecuador) C Romero (Ecuador) C Römer	1	4	[10]
