= Tennis at the 2018 South American Games – Mixed doubles =

Mixed doubles
- Tennis at the 2018 South American Games

Events
| Singles | men | women |
| Doubles | men | women | mixed |
- South American Games

The mixed doubles event at the 2018 South American Games was held from 30 May to 2 June.

== Medalists ==
| Gold | Silver | Bronze |
|---|---|---|
| Roberto Maytín; Aymet Uzcátegui; Venezuela | Tomás Farjat; Melany Krywoj; Argentina | Gonzalo Lama; Alexa Guarachi; Chile |

== Draw ==
Quarterfinals
(Chile) Gonzalo Lama (Chile) Alexa Guarachi | 6 | 6
(Colombia) Felipe Mantilla (Colombia) Paula Andrea Pérez | 2 | 3
(Peru) Arklon Huertas (Peru) Camila Soares | 6^{5} | 4
(Argentina) Tomás Farjat (Argentina) Melany Krywoj | 7^{7} | 6
(Ecuador) Iván Endara (Ecuador) Mell Reasco | 4 | 5
2 | (Bolivia) Federico Zeballos (Bolivia) Noelia Zeballos | 6 | 7

Semifinals
1 | (Venezuela) Roberto Maytín (Venezuela) Aymet Uzcátegui | 7^{7} | 6
(Chile) Gonzalo Lama (Chile) Alexa Guarachi | 6^{5} | 4
(Argentina) Tomás Farjat (Argentina) Melany Krywoj | 6 | 6
2 | (Bolivia) Federico Zeballos (Bolivia) Noelia Zeballos | 1 | 2

Final
1 | (Venezuela) Roberto Maytín (Venezuela) Aymet Uzcátegui | 7^{7} | 6
(Argentina) Tomás Farjat (Argentina) Melany Krywoj | 6^{2} | 0
Third place
(Chile) Gonzalo Lama (Chile) Alexa Guarachi | 4 | 4
2 | (Bolivia) Federico Zeballos (Bolivia) Noelia Zeballos | 0 | 2
