= Tennis at the 2018 South American Games – Men's doubles =

Men's doubles
- Tennis at the 2018 South American Games

Events
Singles	men	women
Doubles	men	women	mixed
- South American Games

The men's doubles event at the 2018 South American Games was held from 29 May to 2 June.

== Medalists ==
Gold	Silver	Bronze
Diego Hidalgo; Emilio Gómez; Ecuador	Jorge Panta; Juan Pablo Varillas; Peru	Cristian Rodríguez; Eduardo Struvay; Colombia

== Draw ==
Key

- Q = Qualifier
- WC = Wild card
- LL = Lucky loser
- Alt = Alternate
- ITF = ITF entry
- PR = Protected ranking
- SR = Special ranking
- SE = Special exempt
- JE = Junior exempt
- JR = Junior Accelerator Programme entrant
- CO = College Accelerator Programme entrant
- NG = Next Gen Accelerator Program entrant
- w/o = Walkover
- r = Retired
- d = Defaulted

1st round
(Bolivia) B Arias (Bolivia) L Chávez	6	7^{7}
(Uruguay) F Roncadelli (Uruguay) W Wibmer	4	6^{3}

2nd round
1	(Venezuela) LD Martínez (Venezuela) R Maytín	7	4	[9]
(Ecuador) D Hidalgo (Ecuador) E Gómez	5	6	[11]
4	(Colombia) C Rodríguez (Colombia) E Struvay	6	4	[10]
(Bolivia) B Arias (Bolivia) L Chávez	4	6	[6]
(Argentina) A Riquelme (Argentina) F Cerúndolo	4	4
3	(Peru) J Panta (Peru) JP Varillas	6	6
(Suriname) G Issa (Suriname) Y Bergen	1	1
2	(Chile) A Tabilo (Chile) MT Barrios Vera	6	6

Semifinals
(Ecuador) D Hidalgo (Ecuador) E Gómez	6	6
4	(Colombia) C Rodríguez (Colombia) E Struvay	4	4
3	(Peru) J Panta (Peru) JP Varillas	6	6
2	(Chile) A Tabilo (Chile) MT Barrios Vera	3	4

Finals
(Ecuador) D Hidalgo (Ecuador) E Gómez	6	6
3	(Peru) J Panta (Peru) JP Varillas	2	3
Third place
4	(Colombia) C Rodríguez (Colombia) E Struvay	5^{8}	4
2	(Chile) A Tabilo (Chile) MT Barrios Vera	4^{6}	2
