= 2026 Como Lake Challenger – Singles =

Singles
- 2026 Como Lake Challenger

Final
- Champion: (Croatia) Matej Dodig
- Runner-up: (Peru) Juan Pablo Varillas
- Score: 6–3, 7–6^{(7–5)}

Events
| Singles | Doubles |
- Como Lake Challenger

Luka Mikrut was the defending champion but chose not to defend his title.

Matej Dodig won the title after defeating Juan Pablo Varillas 6–3, 7–6^{(7–5)} in the final.

== Seeds ==
1. (Greece) Stefanos Sakellaridis (first round)
2. (Spain) Pedro Martínez (second round)
3. (Peru) Gonzalo Bueno (second round)
4. (Czech Republic) Jan Kumstát (first round)
5. (Brazil) Thiago Seyboth Wild (quarterfinals, retired)
6. (Germany) Henri Squire (first round, retired)
7. (Italy) Raúl Brancaccio (first round)
8. (Italy) Stefano Napolitano (first round, retired)

== Draw ==
Key

- Q = Qualifier
- WC = Wild card
- LL = Lucky loser
- Alt = Alternate
- ITF = ITF entry
- PR = Protected ranking
- SR = Special ranking
- SE = Special exempt
- JE = Junior exempt
- JR = Junior Accelerator Programme entrant
- CO = College Accelerator Programme entrant
- NG = Next Gen Accelerator Program entrant
- w/o = Walkover
- r = Retired
- d = Defaulted

=== Finals ===
Semifinals
Q | (Switzerland) Johan Nikles | 3 | 0
(Croatia) Matej Dodig | 6 | 6
(Peru) Juan Pablo Varillas | 6^{4} | 7 | 6
(United Kingdom) Jay Clarke | 7^{7} | 5 | 1

Final
(Croatia) Matej Dodig | 6 | 7^{7}
(Peru) Juan Pablo Varillas | 3 | 6^{5}

=== Top half ===
First round
1 | (Greece) S Sakellaridis | 6 | 3 | 6^{2}
Q | (Bosnia and Herzegovina) A Nedić | 2 | 6 | 7^{7}
(Chile) M Soto | 3 | 2
(Switzerland) K Feldbausch | 6 | 6
Q | (Sweden) O Wallin | 4 | 6 | 4
Q | (Switzerland) J Nikles | 6 | 3 | 6
(Romania) FC Jianu | 6 | 2
6 | (Germany) H Squire | 4 | 1^{r}
3 | (Peru) G Bueno | 6 | 7
(Brazil) JL Reis da Silva | 2 | 5
(Ecuador) Á Guillén Meza | 2 | 7^{7} | 1
JR | (Germany) M Schönhaus | 6 | 6^{5} | 6
(Croatia) M Dodig | 6 | 6
(Croatia) M Poljičak | 2 | 3
JR | (Switzerland) H Bernet | 3
8 | (Italy) S Napolitano | 0^{r}

Second round
Q | (Bosnia and Herzegovina) A Nedić | 7^{8} | 6
(Switzerland) K Feldbausch | 6^{6} | 3
Q | (Switzerland) J Nikles | 6 | 6
(Romania) FC Jianu | 1 | 3
3 | (Peru) G Bueno | 1 | 3
JR | (Germany) M Schönhaus | 6 | 6
(Croatia) M Dodig | 6^{1} | 7^{7} | 7
JR | (Switzerland) H Bernet | 7^{7} | 6^{3} | 5

Quarterfinals
Q | (Bosnia and Herzegovina) A Nedić | 6 | 2 | 1
Q | (Switzerland) J Nikles | 4 | 6 | 6
JR | (Germany) M Schönhaus | 6 | 6^{1} | 3
(Croatia) M Dodig | 2 | 7^{7} | 6

Semifinals
Q | (Switzerland) J Nikles | 3 | 0
(Croatia) M Dodig | 6 | 6

=== Bottom half ===
First round
5 | (Brazil) T Seyboth Wild | 6 | 6
(Czech Republic) M Krumich | 3 | 4
Q | (Slovakia) N Gombos | 6 | 6
(Austria) S Kopp | 3 | 3
WC | (Italy) F Arnaboldi | 2
(Italy) F Bondioli | 4^{r}
(Peru) JP Varillas | 6 | 6
4/NG | (Czech Republic) J Kumstát | 4 | 3
7 | (Italy) R Brancaccio | 6^{1} | 2
Alt | (Croatia) D Ajduković | 7^{7} | 6
WC | (Italy) Juan Cruz Martin Manzano | 6 | 3 | 6
Q | (Italy) Fausto Tabacco | 3 | 6 | 0
Q | (Italy) F Forti | 2 | 4
(United Kingdom) J Clarke | 6 | 6
WC | (Italy) Lorenzo Carboni | 1 | 0^{r}
2 | (Spain) P Martínez | 6 | 3

Second round
5 | (Brazil) T Seyboth Wild | 6 | 6
Q | (Slovakia) N Gombos | 4 | 3
WC | (Italy) F Arnaboldi | 3 | 1
(Peru) JP Varillas | 6 | 6
Alt | (Croatia) D Ajduković | 7^{7} | 5 | 6
WC | (Italy) JC Martin Manzano | 6^{5} | 7 | 2
(United Kingdom) J Clarke | 7 | 3 | 6
2 | (Spain) P Martínez | 5 | 6 | 4

Quarterfinals
5 | (Brazil) T Seyboth Wild | 6 | 6^{4} | 3^{r}
(Peru) JP Varillas | 4 | 7^{7} | 4
Alt | (Croatia) D Ajduković | 6 | 3 | 2
(United Kingdom) J Clarke | 2 | 6 | 6

Semifinals
(Peru) JP Varillas | 6^{4} | 7 | 6
(United Kingdom) J Clarke | 7^{7} | 5 | 1
