= 2026 Como Lake Challenger – Doubles =

Doubles
- 2026 Como Lake Challenger

Final
- Champions: (Croatia) Admir Kalender (Croatia) Nino Serdarušić
- Runners-up: (Poland) Karol Drzewiecki (Poland) Piotr Matuszewski
- Score: 6–3, 6–4

Events
Singles	Doubles
- Como Lake Challenger

Victor Vlad Cornea and Santiago Rodríguez Taverna were the defending champions but only Cornea chose to defend his title, partnering Michael Vrbenský. They lost in the quarterfinals to Ivan and Matej Sabanov.

Admir Kalender and Nino Serdarušić won the title after defeating Karol Drzewiecki and Piotr Matuszewski 6–3, 6–4 in the final.

== Seeds ==
1. (Poland) Karol Drzewiecki / (Poland) Piotr Matuszewski (final)
2. (Croatia) Admir Kalender / (Croatia) Nino Serdarušić (champions)
3. (Romania) Alexandru Jecan / (Romania) Bogdan Pavel (first round)
4. (Germany) Tim Rühl / (Netherlands) Mick Veldheer (first round)

== Draw ==
Key

- Q = Qualifier
- WC = Wild card
- LL = Lucky loser
- Alt = Alternate
- ITF = ITF entry
- PR = Protected ranking
- SR = Special ranking
- SE = Special exempt
- JE = Junior exempt
- JR = Junior Accelerator Programme entrant
- CO = College Accelerator Programme entrant
- NG = Next Gen Accelerator Program entrant
- w/o = Walkover
- r = Retired
- d = Defaulted

First round
1	(Poland) K Drzewiecki (Poland) P Matuszewski	6	6
(United Kingdom) F Bass (Chile) M Soto	4	4
(United Kingdom) J Clarke (Switzerland) K Feldbausch	6	3	[10]
Alt	(Italy) F Arnaboldi (Italy) L Rottoli	3	6	[6]
3	(Romania) A Jecan (Romania) B Pavel	7	3	[5]
(Serbia) I Sabanov (Serbia) M Sabanov	5	6	[10]
(Romania) V Cornea (Czech Republic) M Vrbenský	6	7^{7}
(Peru) A Merino (United States) Michael Zhu	4	6^{3}
WC	(Italy) Juan Cruz Martin Manzano (Italy) G Ricca	4	6	[2]
(Spain) Ignasi Forcano (Netherlands) M Vervoort	6	4	[10]
WC	(Italy) Andrea Colombo (Italy) Filippo Francesco Garbero	6	2	[10]
4	(Germany) T Rühl (Netherlands) M Veldheer	4	6	[4]
(Ecuador) Á Guillén Meza (Brazil) JL Reis da Silva	3	0
(Croatia) M Dodig (Croatia) M Poljičak	6	6
(Netherlands) M Hermans (Switzerland) Nicolás Parizzia	5	2
2	(Croatia) A Kalender (Croatia) N Serdarušić	7	6

Quarterfinals
1	(Poland) K Drzewiecki (Poland) P Matuszewski	7	6^{8}	[10]
(United Kingdom) J Clarke (Switzerland) K Feldbausch	5	7^{10}	[7]
(Serbia) I Sabanov (Serbia) M Sabanov	6	7^{7}
(Romania) V Cornea (Czech Republic) M Vrbenský	4	6^{3}
(Spain) I Forcano (Netherlands) M Vervoort	6	7^{7}
WC	(Italy) A Colombo (Italy) FF Garbero	1	6^{2}
(Croatia) M Dodig (Croatia) M Poljičak	6^{4}	3
2	(Croatia) A Kalender (Croatia) N Serdarušić	7^{7}	6

Semifinals
1	(Poland) K Drzewiecki (Poland) P Matuszewski	6	6
(Serbia) I Sabanov (Serbia) M Sabanov	2	3
(Spain) I Forcano (Netherlands) M Vervoort	6^{5}	4
2	(Croatia) A Kalender (Croatia) N Serdarušić	7^{7}	6

Final
1	(Poland) K Drzewiecki (Poland) P Matuszewski	3	4
2	(Croatia) A Kalender (Croatia) N Serdarušić	6	6
