= Juan Pablo Varillas =

Peruvian tennis player

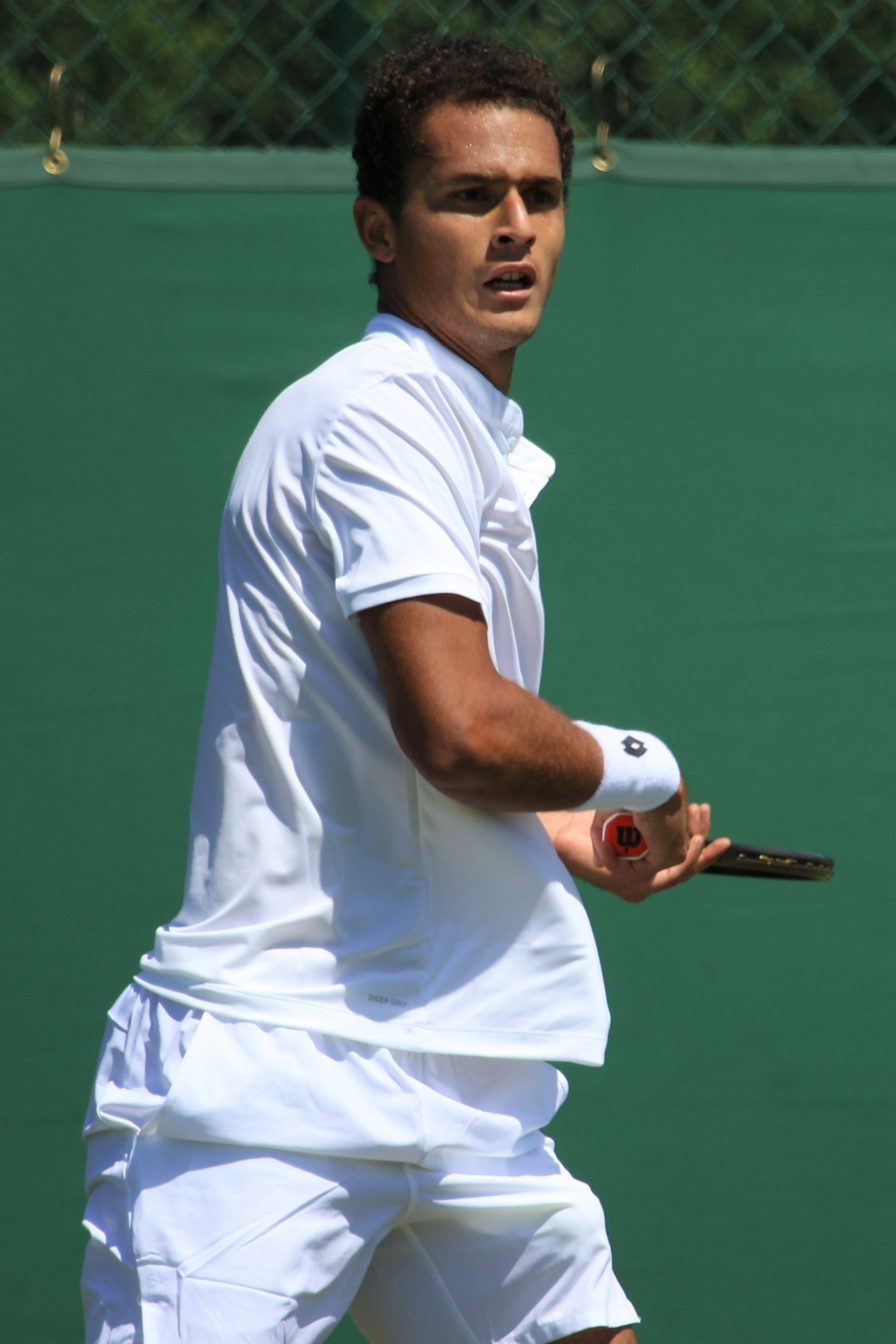
- Varillas at the 2022 Wimbledon Championships
- Full name: Juan Pablo Varillas Patiño-Samudio
- Country (sports): Peru
- Residence: Lima, Peru
- Born: 6 October 1995 (age 30) Lima, Peru
- Height: 1.85 m (6 ft 1 in)
- Turned pro: 2013
- Plays: Right-handed (two-handed backhand)
- Coach: Diego Junqueira
- Prize money: US $1,866,225

Singles
- Career record: 38–49 (at ATP Tour level, Grand Slam level, and in Davis Cup)
- Career titles: 0
- Highest ranking: No. 60 (26 June 2023)
- Current ranking: No. 234 (31 August 2026)

Grand Slam singles results
- Australian Open: 1R (2023, 2024)
- French Open: 4R (2023)
- Wimbledon: 1R (2023)
- US Open: 2R (2023)

Other tournaments
- Olympic Games: 1R (2021)

Doubles
- Career record: 4–15 (at ATP Tour level, Grand Slam level, and in Davis Cup)
- Career titles: 0
- Highest ranking: No. 289 (10 May 2021)

Grand Slam doubles results
- Australian Open: 1R (2023)
- French Open: 1R (2023)
- Wimbledon: 1R (2023)
- US Open: 1R (2023)

Team competitions
- Davis Cup: 16–15
Medal record
Representing Peru
Men's tennis
Pan American Games
Bronze medal – third place	2019 Lima	Doubles
South American Games
Silver medal – second place	2018 Cochabamba	Doubles
Bronze medal – third place	2018 Cochabamba	Singles
Bolivarian Games
Gold medal – first place	2025 Lima-Ayacucho	Singles
Silver medal – second place	2025 Lima-Ayacucho	Doubles
- Last updated on: 31 August 2026.

Juan Pablo Varillas Patiño-Samudio (Spanish pronunciation: [ˈxwam ˈpaβlo βaˈɾiʝas]; (Note: In isolation, Juan and Varillas are pronounced [ˈxwan] and [baˈɾiʝas] respectively.) born 6 October 1995) is a Peruvian professional tennis player. He has a career-high ATP singles ranking of world No. 60, achieved on 26 June 2023 and a best doubles ranking of No. 289, reached on 10 May 2021. He is currently the No. 3 singles player from Peru.

Varillas plays mostly on ATP Challenger Tour, where he has won seven titles in singles. On ITF Men's Tour, he earned nine trophies combined, five in singles and four in doubles. He represents Peru at the Davis Cup where he has a total W/L record of 16–15. In singles his W/L is 13–11.

== Career ==
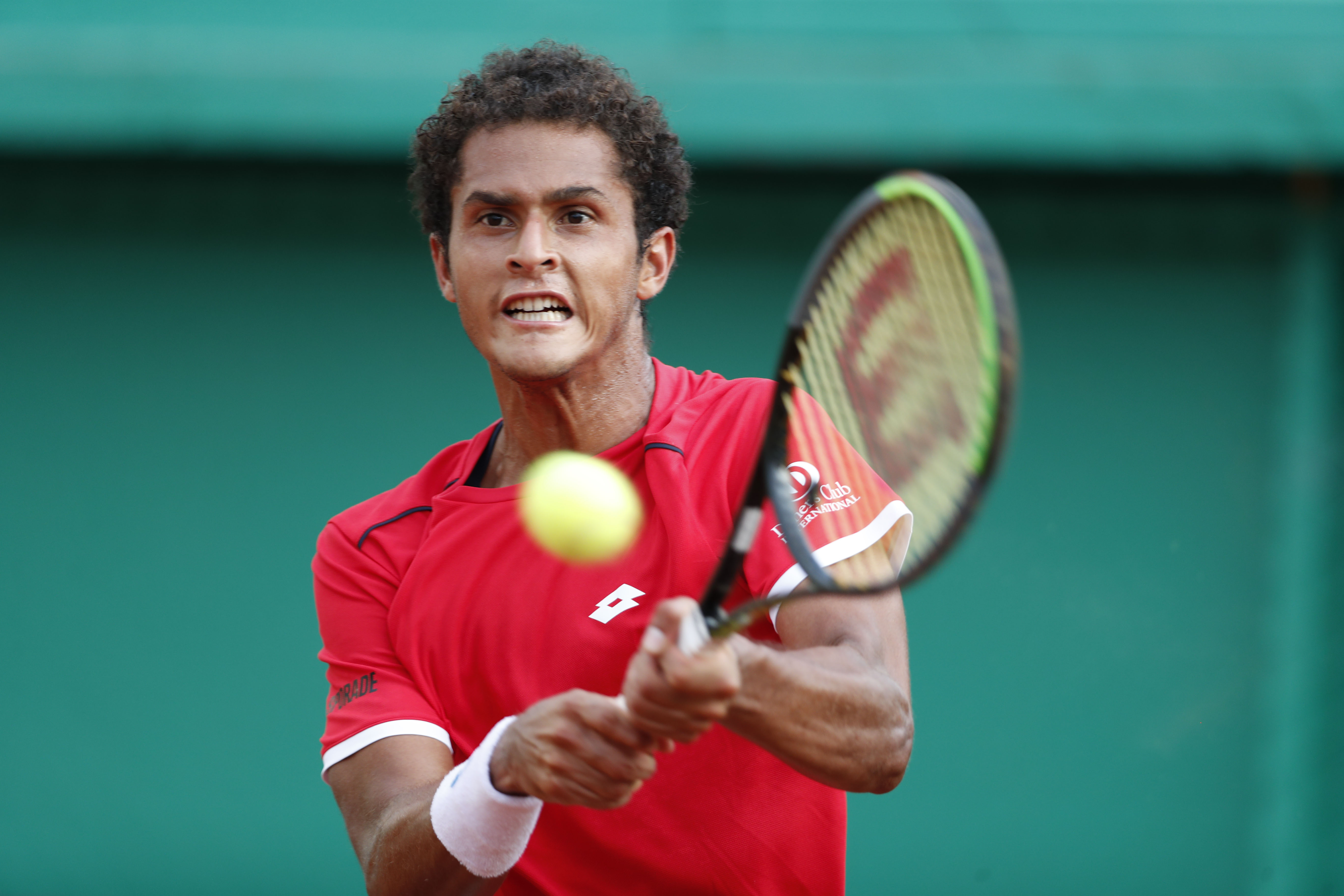
Varillas at the 2019 Pan American Games

=== 2020–2021: ATP & Olympics debut ===
Varillas made his ATP debut at the 2020 Chile Open as a lucky loser where he reached the second round by defeating Filip Horansky before losing to Albert Ramos Viñolas. The following year at the same tournament he reached the quarterfinals as a qualifier where he lost to top seed and eventual winner Cristian Garín. Varillas qualified to represent Peru at the Summer Olympics.

=== 2022: Grand Slam & top 100 debut ===
At the 2022 French Open he qualified to make his Grand Slam main draw debut but lost to ninth seed Félix Auger-Aliassime.

He reached the quarterfinals at the 2022 Swiss Open Gstaad as a qualifier defeating top-20 player and third seed Roberto Bautista Agut before losing to Dominic Thiem. He also reached the round of 16 at the 2022 Generali Open Kitzbühel where he lost to fifth seed Albert Ramos Viñolas. As a result, he made his debut in the top 100, as one of the five Peruvian men to achieve the feat, at a new career-high of world No. 97 on 1 August 2022.

=== 2023: Best season: first Major wins & fourth round, top 60 ===
At the Australian Open he entered for the first time into the main draw at this Major as a lucky loser but lost in the first round to former top-2 player and twelfth seed Alexander Zverev. At the 2023 Argentina Open he reached the round of 16 as a qualifier defeating João Sousa. Next he defeated former top-3 player wildcard Dominic Thiem to move into the quarterfinals. He reached his first ATP semifinal with his second win over a top-20 player and third seed Lorenzo Musetti. As a result, he moved 20 positions up and reached a new career high ranking in the top 80 on 27 February 2023.

At the French Open, Varillas came from two sets to love down to defeat Shang Juncheng and win his first Grand slam match. He then defeated 19th seed Roberto Bautista Agut in five sets also from two sets to love down. He recorded the biggest victory of his career by ranking defeating 13th seed Hubert Hurkacz also in five sets to reach the fourth round for the first time at a Major. He became the first Peruvian to reach the fourth round of Roland Garros in 29 years since Jaime Yzaga in 1994. He reached a new career-high ranking in the top 60 on 26 June 2023.

=== 2024–2025: Back to top 300 ===
Following a final showing at the 2025 Guayaquil Challenger, Varillas returned to the top 300 in the singles rankings at world No. 257 on 1 December 2025.

== Performance timelines ==
Key
W	F	SF	QF	#R	RR	Q#	DNQ	A	NH

(W) winner; (F) finalist; (SF) semifinalist; (QF) quarterfinalist; (#R) rounds 4, 3, 2, 1; (RR) round-robin stage; (Q#) qualification round; (DNQ) did not qualify; (A) absent; (NH) not held; (SR) strike rate (events won / competed); (W–L) win–loss record.
To avoid confusion and double counting, these charts are updated at the conclusion of a tournament or when the player's participation has ended.

=== Singles ===
Current through the 2025 Australian Open – Men's singles qualifying.

Tournament	2015	2016	2017	2018	2019	2020	2021	2022	2023	2024	2025	SR	W–L	Win%
Grand Slam tournaments
Australian Open	A	A	A	A	A	Q2	A	Q2	1R	1R	Q1	0 / 2	0–2	0%
French Open	A	A	A	A	A	Q1	Q1	1R	4R	Q1		0 / 2	3–2	60%
Wimbledon	A	A	A	A	A	NH	Q1	Q1	1R	A		0 / 1	0–1	0%
US Open	A	A	A	A	A	A	Q1	Q1	2R	Q1		0 / 1	1–1	50%
Win–loss						0–0	0–0	0–1	4–4	0–1	0–0	0 / 6	4–6	40%
Career statistics
	2015	2016	2017	2018	2019	2020	2021	2022	2023	2024	2025	Total		
Tournaments	0	0	0	0	0	1	2	6	20	7	0	36		
Titles	0	0	0	0	0	0	0	0	0	0	0	0		
Finals	0	0	0	0	0	0	0	0	0	0	0	0		
Overall win–loss	0–3	1–0	0–2	1–2	1–1	3–1	5–3	8–6	17–20	2–10	0–0	38–48		
Win (%)	0%	100%	0%	33%	50%	75%	63%	57%	46%	17%	–			
Year-end ranking	655	641	493	350	143	158	129	105	83	210	327			

== ATP Challenger Tour finals ==
=== Singles: 14 (7 titles, 7 runner-ups) ===
Legend ATP Challenger Tour (7–7)	Finals by surface Hard (–) Clay (7–7)

Result	W–L	Date	Tournament	Tier	Surface	Opponent	Score
Win	1–0	Oct 2019	Internacional de Campinas, Brazil	Challenger	Clay	(Argentina) Juan Pablo Ficovich	2–6, 7–6^{(7–4)}, 6–2
Win	2–0	Oct 2019	Santo Domingo Milex Open, Dominican Republic	Challenger	Clay	(Argentina) Federico Coria	6–3, 2–6, 6–2
Win	3–0	May 2021	Biella Challenger V, Italy	Challenger	Clay	(Argentina) Guido Andreozzi	6–3, 6–1
Loss	3–1	May 2021	Zagreb Open, Croatia	Challenger	Clay	(Argentina) Sebastián Báez	6–3, 3–6, 1–6
Loss	3–2	Sep 2021	Ambato La Gran Ciudad Open, Ecuador	Challenger	Clay	(Argentina) Thiago Agustín Tirante	5–7, 5–7
Win	4–2	Oct 2021	Challenger de Santiago II, Chile	Challenger	Clay	(Argentina) Sebastián Báez	6–4, 7–5
Loss	4–3	Mar 2022	Santa Cruz Challenger II, Bolivia	Challenger	Clay	(United Kingdom) Paul Jubb	3–6, 6–7^{(5–7)}
Loss	4–4	Oct 2022	Internacional de Campinas, Brazil	Challenger	Clay	(United Kingdom) Jan Choinski	4–6, 4–6
Win	5–4	Nov 2022	São Léo Open, Brazil	Challenger	Clay	(Argentina) Facundo Bagnis	7–6^{(7–5)}, 4–6, 6–4
Loss	5–5	Mar 2023	Sanremo Challenger, Italy	Challenger	Clay	(France) Luca Van Assche	1–6, 3–6
Win	6–5	Mar 2024	Challenger de Santiago, Chile	Challenger	Clay	(Argentina) Facundo Bagnis	6–3, 6–2
Win	7–5	Jan 2025	Challenger de Tigre, Argentina	Challenger	Clay	(Paraguay) Daniel Vallejo	6–4, 6–4
Loss	7–6	Nov 2025	Challenger de Guayaquil, Ecuador	Challenger	Clay	(Paraguay) Daniel Vallejo	5–7, 7–6^{(9–7)}, 3–6
Loss	7–7	Aug 2026	Como Lake Challenger, Italy	Challenger	Clay	(Croatia) Matej Dodig	3–6, 6–7^{(5–7)}

=== Doubles: 2 (2 runner-ups) ===
Legend ATP Challenger Tour (0–2)

Result	W–L	Date	Tournament	Tier	Surface	Partner	Opponents	Score
Loss	0–1	Aug 2019	San Benedetto Cup, Italy	Challenger	Clay	(Peru) Sergio Galdós	(Croatia) Ivan Sabanov (Croatia) Matej Sabanov	4–6, 6–4, 5–10
Loss	0–2	Apr 2021	Garden Open, Italy	Challenger	Clay	(Italy) Paolo Lorenzi	(France) Sadio Doumbia (France) Fabien Reboul	6–7^{(5–7)}, 5–7

== ITF Tour finals ==
=== Singles: 14 (5 titles, 9 runner-ups) ===
Legend ITF Futures/WTT (5–9)	Finals by surface Hard (1–1) Clay (4–8)

Result	W–L	Date	Tournament	Tier	Surface	Opponent	Score
Loss	0–1	Aug 2014	Peru F4, Arequipa	Futures	Clay	(Brazil) Filipe Brandão	4–6, 6–4, 4–6
Loss	0–2	Oct 2016	Ecuador F1, Quito	Futures	Clay	(Ecuador) Iván Endara	6–4, 1–6, 6–7^{(1–7)}
Loss	0–3	Nov 2016	Colombia F7, Pereira	Futures	Clay	(Colombia) Juan Sebastián Gómez	7–6^{(7–4)}, 1–6, 3–6
Loss	0–4	Apr 2017	Turkey F13, Antalya	Futures	Clay	(France) Alexis Musialek	3–6, 7–6^{(7–5)}, 6–7^{(1–7)}
Loss	0–5	May 2017	Turkey F17, Antalya	Futures	Clay	(Austria) Dennis Novak	2–6, 2–6
Win	1–5	Mar 2018	Turkey F9, Antalya	Futures	Clay	(Austria) Dennis Novak	6–4, 6–4
Loss	1–6	Mar 2018	Turkey F10, Antalya	Futures	Clay	(Russia) Ivan Nedelko	2–6, 6–7^{(3–7)}
Loss	1–7	May 2018	Turkey F18, Antalya	Futures	Clay	(France) Jules Okala	2–6, 2–6
Win	2–7	Jul 2018	Belgium F2, Arlon	Futures	Clay	(Belgium) Zizou Bergs	7–6^{(8–6)}, 4–6, 6–1
Win	3–7	Mar 2019	M15 Cancún, Mexico	WTT	Hard	(Japan) Naoki Nakagawa	3–6, 6–3, 6–4
Loss	3–8	Mar 2019	M15 Cancún, Mexico	WTT	Hard	(Argentina) Facundo Mena	6–4, 3–6, 1–6
Win	4–8	May 2019	M25 Pensacola, US	WTT	Clay	(United States) Harrison Adams	6–2, 6–4
Loss	4–9	Jun 2019	M25+H Arlon, Belgium	WTT	Clay	(Belgium) Jeroen Vanneste	5–7, 6–7^{(5–7)}
Win	5–9	Sep 2019	M25 Trieste, Italy	WTT	Clay	(Austria) Alexander Erler	6–7^{(6–8)}, 6–1, 6–4

=== Doubles: 5 (4 titles, 1 runner-up) ===
Legend ITF Futures/WTT (4–1)	Finals by surface Hard (0–1) Clay (4–0)

Result	W–L	Date	Tournament	Tier	Surface	Partner	Opponents	Score
Win	1–0	Aug 2014	Peru F4, Arequipa	Futures	Clay	(Peru) Jorge Panta	(Japan) Ryusei Makiguchi (United States) Devin McCarthy	6–3, 3–6, 10–6
Loss	1–1	Nov 2016	Costa Rica F1, San José	Futures	Hard	(United States) Raleigh Smith	(United Kingdom) Farris Fathi Gosea (United States) Cameron Silverman	6–3, 4–6, 4–10
Win	2–1	Apr 2017	Turkey F16, Antalya	Futures	Clay	(Uruguay) Martín Cuevas	(United Kingdom) Joel Cannell (Australia) James Frawley	6–2, 6–4
Win	3–1	May 2019	M25 Bacău, Romania	WTT	Clay	(Chile) Alejandro Tabilo	(Peru) Alexander Merino (Argentina) Manuel Peña López	7–6^{(7–5)}, 7–6^{(7–4)}
Win	4–1	Jun 2019	M25 Huelva, Spain	WTT	Clay	(Peru) Sergio Galdós	(Poland) Mateusz Kowalczyk (Poland) Maciej Smola	6–2, 6–4

== Other finals ==
=== South American Games ===
==== Singles: 1 (bronze medal) ====
Result	Date	Tournament	Surface	Opponent	Score
Bronze	2018	South American Games, Bolivia	Clay	(Colombia) Eduardo Struvay	4–0, 4–0

==== Doubles: 1 (silver medal) ====
Result	Date	Tournament	Surface	Partner	Opponents	Score
Silver	2018	South American Games, Bolivia	Clay	(Peru) Jorge Panta	(Ecuador) Diego Hidalgo (Ecuador) Emilio Gómez	2–6, 3–6

== Record against top 10 players ==
Varillas's record against players who have been ranked in the top 10, with those who are active in boldface. Only ATP Tour main draw matches are considered:

Player	Record	Win %	Hard	Clay	Grass	Last match
Number 1 ranked players						
(Serbia) **Novak Djokovic**	0–1	0%	–	0–1	–	Lost (3–6, 2–6, 2–6) at 2023 French Open
Number 2 ranked players						
(Germany) **Alexander Zverev**	0–1	0%	0–1	–	–	Lost (6–4, 1–6, 7–5, 6–7^{(3–7)}, 4–6) at 2023 Australian Open
Number 3 ranked players						
(Austria) **Dominic Thiem**	1–2	33%	0–1	1–1	–	Lost (3–6, 6–7^{(8–10)}) at 2023 Astana Open
(Bulgaria) **Grigor Dimitrov**	0–1	0%	0–1	–	–	Lost (3–6, 4–6) at 2023 Chengdu Open
Number 5 ranked players						
(Russia) **Andrey Rublev**	0–1	0%	–	0–1	–	Lost (2–6, 2–6) at 2023 Srpska
Number 6 ranked players						
(Canada) **Félix Auger-Aliassime**	0–1	0%	–	0–1	–	Lost (6–2, 6–2, 1–6, 3–6, 3–6) at 2022 French Open
Number 8 ranked players						
(Argentina) **Diego Schwartzman**	0–1	0%	0–1	–	–	Lost (5–7, 4–6) at 2020 Summer Olympics
(United Kingdom) **Cameron Norrie**	0–1	0%	–	0–1	–	Lost (6–7^{(5–7)}, 4–6) at 2023 Argentina Open
Number 9 ranked players						
(Spain) **Roberto Bautista Agut**	2–0	100%	–	2–0	–	Won (1–6, 4–6, 6–3, 6–1, 6–1) at 2023 French Open
(Poland) **Hubert Hurkacz**	1–0	100%	–	1–0	–	Won (3–6, 6–3, 7–6^{(7–3)}, 4–6, 6–2) at 2023 French Open
Total	4–9	31%	0–4 (0%)	4–5 (44%)	0–0 ( – )	* Statistics correct as of 28 September 2023.
