= Tennis at the 2018 South American Games – Men's singles =

Men's singles
- Tennis at the 2018 South American Games

Events
Singles	men	women
Doubles	men	women	mixed
- South American Games

The men's singles event at the 2018 South American Games was held from 28 May to 2 June.

== Medalists ==
Gold	Silver	Bronze
Marcelo Tomás Barrios Vera; Chile	Francisco Cerúndolo; Argentina	Juan Pablo Varillas; Peru

== Draw ==
Key

- Q = Qualifier
- WC = Wild card
- LL = Lucky loser
- Alt = Alternate
- ITF = ITF entry
- PR = Protected ranking
- SR = Special ranking
- SE = Special exempt
- JE = Junior exempt
- JR = Junior Accelerator Programme entrant
- CO = College Accelerator Programme entrant
- NG = Next Gen Accelerator Program entrant
- w/o = Walkover
- r = Retired
- d = Defaulted

=== Final four ===
Semifinals
1	(Chile) Marcelo Tomás Barrios Vera	6	6
4	(Peru) Juan Pablo Varillas	3	2
(Colombia) Eduardo Struvay	6	1	5
(Argentina) Francisco Cerúndolo	2	6	7

Final
1	(Chile) Marcelo Tomás Barrios Vera	7^{7}	6
(Argentina) Francisco Cerúndolo	6^{5}	4
Bronze medal match
4	(Peru) Juan Pablo Varillas	4	4
(Colombia) Eduardo Struvay	0	0

=== Top half ===
First round
(Peru) J Panta	6	6
(Suriname) Y Bergen	0	0
(Uruguay) W Wibmer	0	0
(Ecuador) D Hidalgo	6	6
(Bolivia) B Arias	6	6
(Ecuador) I Endara	4	3
(Bolivia) L Chávez	6	6^{4}	6
(Argentina) A Riquelme	2	7^{7}	0

Second round
1	(Chile) MT Barrios Vera	7	7^{8}
(Peru) J Panta	5	6^{6}
(Ecuador) D Hidalgo	6	3	6
7	(Colombia) F Mantilla	2	6	3
4	(Peru) JP Varillas	6	6
(Bolivia) B Arias	3	2
(Bolivia) L Chávez	6^{4}	3
6	(Bolivia) F Zeballos	7^{7}	6

Quarterfinals
1	(Chile) MT Barrios Vera	6	3	6
(Ecuador) D Hidalgo	4	6	3
4	(Peru) JP Varillas	6	6
6	(Bolivia) F Zeballos	2	2

Semifinals
1	(Chile) MT Barrios Vera	6	6
4	(Peru) JP Varillas	3	2

=== Bottom half ===
First round
(Colombia) E Struvay	3	7^{7}	6
(Argentina) T Farjat	6	6^{5}	4
(Uruguay) F Roncadelli	4	1
(Peru) A Huertas del Pino	6	6
(Argentina) F Cerúndolo	6	7^{7}
(Venezuela) LD Martínez	3	6^{4}

Second round
5	(Ecuador) E Gómez	4	6	3
(Colombia) E Struvay	6	3	6
(Peru) A Huertas del Pino	2	6	3
3	(Chile) G Lama	6	3	6
8	(Chile) A Tabilo	6	6
(Suriname) G Issa	3	3
(Argentina) F Cerúndolo	3	6	7^{8}
2	(Colombia) C Rodríguez	6	2	6^{6}

Quarterfinals
(Colombia) E Struvay	6	6
3	(Chile) G Lama	3	3
8	(Chile) A Tabilo	5	6^{5}
(Argentina) F Cerúndolo	7	7^{7}

Semifinals
(Colombia) E Struvay	6	1	5
(Argentina) F Cerúndolo	2	6	7
