= Tennis at the 2018 South American Games =

- Venue: Centro de Alto Rendimiento Federico Román
- Location: (Bolivia) Villa Tunari
- Dates: 28 May – 2 June

Tennis at the 2018 South American Games

Champions

Men's singles
- Tomás Barrios (CHI)

Women's singles
- Montserrat González (PAR)

Men's doubles
- Diego Hidalgo; Emilio Gómez (ECU)

Women's doubles
- Alexa Guarachi; Daniela Seguel (CHI)

Mixed doubles
- Roberto Maytín; Aymet Uzcátegui (VEN)
← 2014 ·	South American Games	· 2022 →

There were five tennis events at the 2018 South American Games. The events were held from 28 May to 2 June.

== Participating nations ==
- Argentina
- Bolivia
- Chile
- Colombia
- Ecuador
- Paraguay
- Peru
- Suriname
- Uruguay
- Venezuela

== Medalists ==
Event	Gold	Silver	Bronze
Men's events
Men's singles	Tomás Barrios; Chile	Francisco Cerúndolo; Argentina	Juan Pablo Varillas; Peru
Men's doubles	Diego Hidalgo; Emilio Gómez; Ecuador	Jorge Panta; Juan Pablo Varillas; Peru	Cristian Rodríguez; Eduardo Struvay; Colombia
Women's events
Women's singles	Montserrat González; Paraguay	Daniela Seguel; Chile	Fernanda Brito; Chile
Women's doubles	Alexa Guarachi; Daniela Seguel; Chile	Camila Giangreco; Montserrat González; Paraguay	Camila Romero; Charlotte Römer; Ecuador
Mixed events
Mixed doubles	Roberto Maytín; Aymet Uzcátegui; Venezuela	Tomás Farjat; Melany Krywoj; Argentina	Gonzalo Lama; Alexa Guarachi; Chile

== Medal table ==
Rank	Nation	Gold	Silver	Bronze	Total
1	Chile (CHI)	2	1	2	5
2	Paraguay (PAR)	1	1	0	2
3	Ecuador (ECU)	1	0	1	2
4	Venezuela (VEN)	1	0	0	1
5	Argentina (ARG)	0	2	0	2
6	Peru (PER)	0	1	1	2
7	Colombia (COL)	0	0	1	1
Totals (7 entries)		5	5	5	15
