= Daniela Seguel =

Chilean tennis player (born 1992)

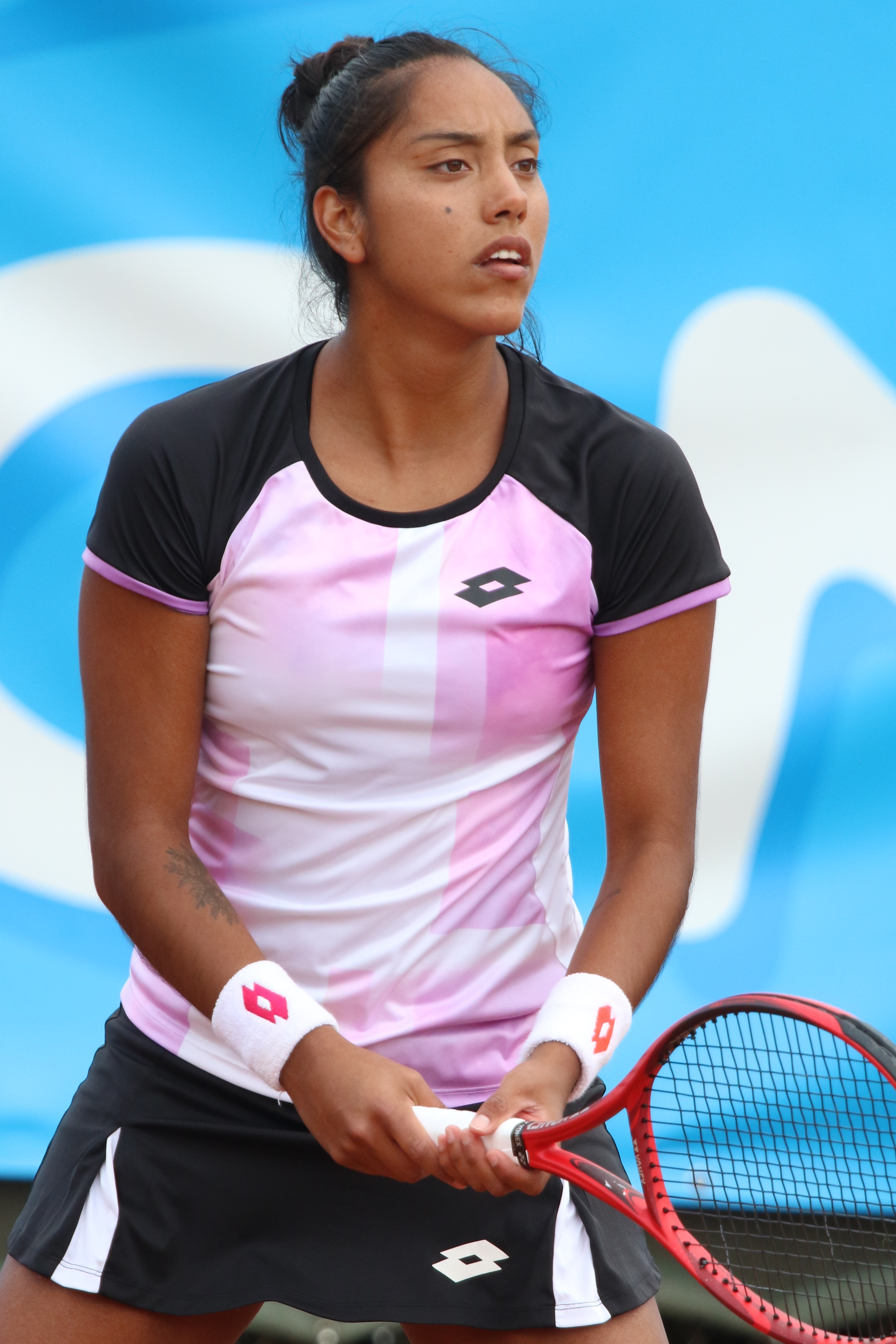
- Seguel at Biarritz, 2021
- Full name: Daniela Valeska Seguel Carvajal
- Country (sports): Chile
- Born: 15 November 1992 (age 33) Santiago, Chile
- Height: 1.71 m (5 ft 7 in)
- Turned pro: 2007
- Prize money: US$ 490,186

Singles
- Career record: 397–293
- Career titles: 16 ITF
- Highest ranking: No. 162 (28 May 2018)

Grand Slam singles results
- Australian Open: Q2 (2018, 2021, 2022)
- French Open: Q3 (2020)
- Wimbledon: Q1 (2018, 2021)
- US Open: Q1 (2016, 2017, 2021)

Doubles
- Career record: 284–170
- Career titles: 28 ITF
- Highest ranking: No. 110 (7 July 2014)

Grand Slam doubles results
- Wimbledon: 1R (2014)

Team competitions
- Fed Cup: 30–22
Medal record
Representing Chile
Women's Tennis
South American Games
Gold medal – first place	2018 Cochabamba	Women's doubles
Silver medal – second place	2018 Cochabamba	Women's singles
Bronze medal – third place	2022 Asunción	Women's doubles
- Last updated on: 15 May 2026.

Daniela Valeska Seguel Carvajal (born 15 November 1992) is an inactive Chilean tennis player. She has won 16 singles titles and 28 doubles titles on the ITF Women's Circuit. On 28 May 2018, she reached her career-high singles ranking of world No. 162, weeks after reaching quarterfinals on the Copa Colsanitas, her best result on a WTA Tour tournament yet. Seguel's first-round win over Nicole Gibbs was the first professional match won by a Chilean female tennis player since 1980. On 7 July 2014, she peaked at No. 110 in the WTA doubles rankings.

Playing for Chile, Seguel has an overall win-loss record of 30–22 in Billie Jean King Cup (as of August 2024).

== Career overview ==
=== Juniors ===
In 2006, her debut on the ITF Junior Circuit came at the age of 13. She played her first tournament at the first Open Junior International Chile, in May, and reached the quarterfinals, before losing to Argentinian player Ornella Caron, in straight sets. In 2007, she won her first singles title at the second Junior Open Chile, in October.

In 2008, she reached one final, at the Copa Gobierno Bolivariano de Carabobo in Valencia, Venezuela. In 2009, she won the Vina Junior Open, by defeating her compatriot Cecilia Costa Melgar in the final, in straight sets.

In 2010, she played her last junior tournament, at the 27th Copa Gerdau in Porto Alegre, Brazil where she was stopped in the second round by Slovak player Jana Čepelová.

=== Professional ===
Seguel made her debut at the professional level in 2007, at a 10k tournament in Santiago, Chile. In singles, she lost in the first round to Vivian Segnini.

In July 2010, she reached her first ITF singles final in La Paz, Bolivia. She lost the final in straight sets to Colombian player Karen Castiblanco and in November she won her first ITF title at a 10k event in Concepción, Chile, alongside compatriot Fernanda Brito. In singles, she won her first title in April 2011, at a 10k event in Córdoba, Argentina.

Her biggest ITF title in singles came at the 60k Barcelona Women World Winner, in June 2017.

In January 2024, she made her debut at the 2024 United Cup in mixed doubles partnering Tomas Barrios Vera where they stunned Greek top 10 duo Maria Sakkari and Stefanos Tsitsipas.

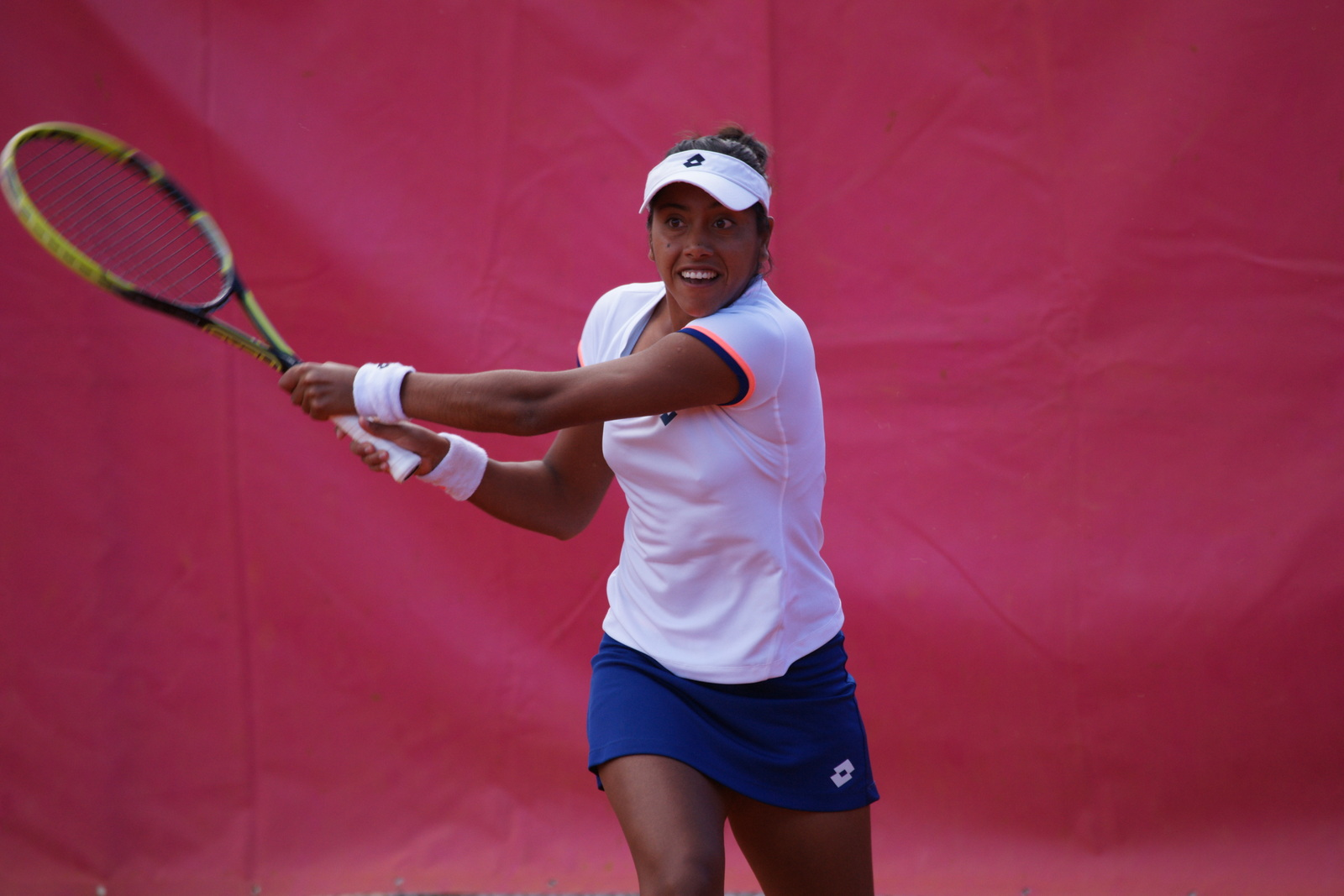
Seguel at the 2014 Open de Cagnes-sur-Mer

== Grand Slam performance timeline ==
Key
W	F	SF	QF	#R	RR	Q#	P#	DNQ	A	Z#	PO	G	S	B	NMS	NTI	P	NH

(W) winner; (F) finalist; (SF) semifinalist; (QF) quarterfinalist; (#R) rounds 4, 3, 2, 1; (RR) round-robin stage; (Q#) qualification round; (P#) preliminary round; (DNQ) did not qualify; (A) absent; (Z#) Davis/Fed Cup Zonal Group (with number indication) or (PO) play-off; (G) gold, (S) silver or (B) bronze Olympic/Paralympic medal; (NMS) not a Masters tournament; (NTI) not a Tier I tournament; (P) postponed; (NH) not held; (SR) strike rate (events won / competed); (W–L) win–loss record.
To avoid confusion and double counting, these charts are updated at the conclusion of a tournament or when the player's participation has ended.

=== Singles ===
Tournament	2016	2017	2018	2019	2020	2021	2022	W–L
Australian Open	A	A	Q2	A	A	Q2	Q2	0–0
French Open	A	A	Q1	A	Q3	Q1	A	0–0
Wimbledon	A	A	Q1	A	NH	Q1	A	0–0
US Open	Q1	Q1	A	A	A	Q1	A	0–0
Win–loss	0–0	0–0	0–0	0–0	0–0	0–0	0–0	0–0

== WTA Tour finals ==
=== Doubles: 1 (runner–up) ===
Legend WTA 500 WTA 250	Finals by surface Hard (0–0) Clay (0–1)

Result	W–L	Date	Tournament	Tier	Surface	Partner	Opponents	Score
Loss	0–1	May 2014	Internationaux de Strasbourg, France	International (Note: The WTA International tournaments were reclassified as WTA 250 tournaments in 2021.)	Clay	(Argentina) Tatiana Búa	(Australia) Ashleigh Barty (Australia) Casey Dellacqua	6–4, 5–7, [4–10]

== WTA 125 finals ==
=== Doubles: 1 (runner-up) ===
Result	W–L	Date	Tournament	Surface	Partner	Opponents	Score
Loss	0–1	Nov 2023	Copa Santiago, Chile	Clay	(Peru) Lucciana Pérez Alarcón	(Germany) Julia Lohoff (Switzerland) Conny Perrin	6–7^{(4–7)}, 2–6

== ITF Circuit finals ==
=== Singles: 24 (16 titles, 8 runner-ups) ===
Legend W60 tournaments (1–0) W25 tournaments (5–4) W10 tournaments (10–4)	Finals by surface Hard (2–0) Clay (14–8)

Result	W–L	Date	Tournament	Tier	Surface	Opponent	Score
Loss	0–1	Jul 2010	ITF La Paz, Bolivia	10,000	Clay	(Colombia) Karen Castiblanco	4–6, 3–6
Win	1–1	Apr 2011	ITF Córdoba, Argentina	10,000	Clay	(Paraguay) Verónica Cepede Royg	7–6^{(4)}, 0–6, 6–4
Win	2–1	Mar 2012	ITF Rancagua, Chile	10,000	Clay	(Argentina) Carolina Zeballos	7–6^{(4)}, 6–3
Win	3–1	Apr 2012	ITF Villa del Dique, Argentina	10,000	Clay	(Peru) Patricia Kú Flores	1–6, 6–0, 7–5
Win	4–1	Apr 2012	ITF Villa del Dique, Argentina	10,000	Clay	(Argentina) Victoria Bosio	7–5, 6–1
Win	5–1	Oct 2012	ITF Santiago, Chile	10,000	Clay	(Argentina) Carolina Zeballos	2–6, 7–5, 7–6^{(4)}
Loss	5–2	Oct 2012	ITF Santiago, Chile	10,000	Clay	(Chile) Cecilia Costa Melgar	4–6, 2–6
Loss	5–3	Jun 2013	ITF Périgueux, France	25,000	Clay	(Brazil) Teliana Pereira	1–6, 4–6
Win	6–3	Jun 2015	ITF Manzanillo, Mexico	10,000	Hard	(Mexico) Nazari Urbina	3–6, 6–4, 6–4
Win	7–3	Jul 2015	ITF Buenos Aires, Argentina	10,000	Clay	(Mexico) Ana Sofía Sánchez	6–2, 6–2
Win	8–3	Aug 2015	ITF Buenos Aires, Argentina	10,000	Clay	(Chile) Fernanda Brito	7–5, 6–1
Loss	8–4	Sep 2015	ITF San Carlos Centro, Argentina	10,000	Clay	(Brazil) Eduarda Piai	1–6, 6–2, 3–6
Win	9–4	Sep 2015	ITF Santa Fe, Argentina	10,000	Clay	(Bolivia) María Álvarez Terán	6–2, 6–1
Win	10–4	Oct 2015	ITF Bucaramanga, Colombia	25,000+H	Clay	(Paraguay) Montserrat González	6–7^{(0)}, 6–3, 6–4
Win	11–4	Nov 2015	ITF Santiago, Chile	10,000	Clay	(Argentina) Catalina Pella	2–6, 6–2, ret.
Loss	11–5	Jun 2016	ITF Helsingborg, Sweden	25,000	Clay	(Sweden) Susanne Celik	4–6, 2–6
Win	12–5	Jul 2016	ITF Campos do Jordão, Brazil	25,000	Hard	(Bulgaria) Aleksandrina Naydenova	7–5, 4–6, 7–5
Loss	12–6	Nov 2016	ITF Santiago, Chile	10,000	Clay	(Brazil) Paula Cristina Gonçalves	6–4, 4–4 ret.
Win	13–6	Jun 2017	Internacional de Barcelona, Spain	60,000	Clay	(France) Amandine Hesse	3–6, 7–6^{(5)}, 7–6^{(3)}
Win	14–6	Oct 2017	ITF Seville, Spain	25,000	Clay	(Belgium) Marie Benoît	2–6, 6–1, 6–2
Loss	14–7	Apr 2019	Nana Trophy Tunis, Tunisia	25,000	Clay	(Romania) Jaqueline Cristian	4–6, 0–6
Win	15–7	May 2019	ITF Rome, Italy	25,000	Clay	(Brazil) Gabriela Cé	6–1, 7–5
Win	16–7	Jan 2020	ITF Vero Beach, United States	25,000	Clay	(Croatia) Tereza Mrdeža	7–5, 6–4
Loss	16–8	Oct 2021	ITF Rio do Sul, Brazil	25,000	Clay	(Hungary) Panna Udvardy	1–6, 0–6

=== Doubles: 47 (28 titles, 19 runner-ups) ===
Legend $100,000 tournaments (0–1) $60,000 tournaments (2–2) $25,000 tournaments (12–6) $10/15,000 tournaments (14–10)	Finals by surface Hard (2–1) Clay (26–18)

Result	W–L	Date	Tournament	Tier	Surface	Partner	Opponents	Score
Loss	0–1	Oct 2010	ITF Bogotá, Colombia	10,000	Clay	(Chile) Fernanda Brito	(Colombia) Karen Castiblanco (Chile) Andrea Koch Benvenuto	6–1, 3–6, [6–10]
Loss	0–2	Nov 2010	ITF Bogotá, Colombia	10,000	Clay	(Colombia) Karen Ramírez Rivera	(Colombia) Karen Castiblanco (Chile) Andrea Koch Benvenuto	4–6, 5–7
Win	1–2	Nov 2010	ITF Concepción, Chile	10,000	Clay	(Chile) Fernanda Brito	(Colombia) Karen Castiblanco (Chile) Camila Silva	6–2, 6–3
Loss	1–3	Mar 2011	ITF Rancagua, Chile	10,000	Clay	(Chile) Belén Ludueña	(Argentina) Andrea Benítez (Brazil) Raquel Piltcher	6–7^{(5)}, 1–6
Loss	1–4	Apr 2011	ITF Córdoba, Argentina	10,000	Clay	(Chile) Belén Ludueña	(Argentina) Andrea Benítez (Argentina) Salome Llaguno	0–6, 7–5, [3–10]
Win	2–4	May 2011	ITF Itaparica, Brazil	10,000	Hard	(Brazil) Nathália Rossi	(Argentina) Andrea Benítez (Brazil) Raquel Piltcher	3–6, 6–0, [10–7]
Loss	2–5	Aug 2011	Reinert Open Versmold, Germany	25,000	Clay	(Chile) Cecilia Costa Melgar	(Ukraine) Elizaveta Ianchuk (Italy) Julia Mayr	4–6, 3–6
Win	3–5	Nov 2011	ITF Rancagua, Chile	10,000	Clay	(Chile) Belén Ludueña	(Brazil) Carla Forte (Brazil) Flávia Guimarães Bueno	6–4, 4–6, [10–5]
Win	4–5	Mar 2012	ITF Rancagua, Chile	10,000	Clay	(Peru) Patricia Kú Flores	(Chile) Fernanda Brito (Brazil) Raquel Piltcher	7–6^{(2)}, 7–5
Win	5–5	Apr 2012	ITF Villa María, Argentina	10,000	Clay	(Peru) Patricia Kú Flores	(Bolivia) María Álvarez Terán (Chile) Camila Silva	4–6, 6–1, [10–4]
Win	6–5	Apr 2012	ITF Villa del Dique, Argentina	10,000	Clay	(Argentina) Luciana Sarmenti	(Argentina) Sofía Luini (Argentina) Guadalupe Pérez Rojas	6–4, 5–7, [10–5]
Loss	6–6	May 2012	ITF Rosario, Argentina	10,000	Clay	(Argentina) Luciana Sarmenti	(Argentina) Tatiana Búa (Chile) Camila Silva	4–6, 6–7^{(2)}
Win	7–6	Jul 2012	ITF Brussels, Belgium	10,000	Clay	(Russia) Anna Smolina	(Belgium) Elyne Boeykens (Australia) Karolina Wlodarczak	2–6, 6–2, [10–7]
Win	8–6	Sep 2012	ITF Buenos Aires, Argentina	10,000	Clay	(Chile) Fernanda Brito	(Argentina) Sofía Luini (Argentina) Guadalupe Pérez Rojas	6–1, 6–3
Loss	8–7	Oct 2012	ITF Santiago, Chile	10,000	Clay	(Chile) Cecilia Costa Melgar	(Argentina) Aranza Salut (Argentina) Carolina Zeballos	6–4, 4–6, [8–10]
Win	9–7	Oct 2012	ITF Santiago, Chile	10,000	Clay	(Chile) Cecilia Costa Melgar	(Argentina) Ornella Caron (Argentina) Aranza Salut	6–3, 6–4
Win	10–7	Nov 2012	ITF Temuco, Chile	10,000	Clay	(Argentina) Victoria Bosio	(Japan) Sachie Ishizu (Guatemala) Daniela Schippers	6–4, 6–2
Win	11–7	Mar 2013	ITF Gonesse, France	10,000	Clay (i)	(Netherlands) Cindy Burger	(Germany) Anne Schäfer (Czech Republic) Kateřina Vaňková	6–7^{(6)}, 6–3, [10–2]
Win	12–7	Aug 2013	ITF Westende, Belgium	25,000	Hard	(Argentina) Tatiana Búa	(Germany) Antonia Lottner (Latvia) Diāna Marcinkēviča	6–3, 5–7, [11–9]
Win	13–7	Aug 2013	ITF Wanfercée-Baulet, Belgium	10,000	Clay	(Argentina) Tatiana Búa	(France) Amandine Hesse (Israel) Deniz Khazaniuk	6–4, 6–2
Loss	13–8	Aug 2013	ITF Wanfercée-Baulet, Belgium	25,000	Clay	(Brazil) Gabriela Cé	(Russia) Irina Khromacheva (Latvia) Diāna Marcinkēviča	4–6, 3–6
Win	14–8	Sep 2013	ITF Alphen aan den Rijn, Netherlands	25,000	Clay	(Netherlands) Cindy Burger	(Netherlands) Demi Schuurs (Netherlands) Eva Wacanno	6–4, 6–1
Win	15–8	Sep 2013	ITF Mont-de-Marsan, France	25,000	Clay	(Chile) Cecilia Costa Melgar	(France) Alizé Lim (France) Laura Thorpe	6–4, 6–2
Loss	15–9	Dec 2013	ITF Santiago, Chile	25,000	Clay	(Chile) Cecilia Costa Melgar	(Paraguay) Verónica Cepede Royg (Argentina) María Irigoyen	6–2, 4–6, [5–10]
Loss	15–10	May 2014	Open de Cagnes-sur-Mer, France	100,000	Clay	(Argentina) Tatiana Búa	(Netherlands) Kiki Bertens (Sweden) Johanna Larsson	6–7^{(4)}, 4–6
Loss	15–11	May 2014	ITF Maribor, Slovenia	25,000	Clay	(Netherlands) Cindy Burger	(Czech Republic) Barbora Krejčíková (Czech Republic) Kateřina Siniaková	0–6, 1–6
Loss	15–12	Aug 2014	ITF Wanfercée-Baulet, Belgium	15,000	Clay	(Argentina) Tatiana Búa	(Belgium) Elise Mertens (Netherlands) Demi Schuurs	2–6, 3–6
Win	16–12	Feb 2015	ITF Beinasco, Italy	25,000	Clay (i)	(Netherlands) Demi Schuurs	(Switzerland) Xenia Knoll (Italy) Alice Matteucci	6–4, 4–6, [11–9]
Loss	16–13	Jun 2015	ITF Manzanillo, Mexico	10,000	Hard	(Mexico) Carolina Betancourt	(Mexico) Camila Fuentes (United States) Zoë Gwen Scandalis	3–6, 7–5, [10–12]
Win	17–13	Jul 2015	ITF Buenos Aires, Argentina	10,000	Clay	(Chile) Fernanda Brito	(Brazil) Nathaly Kurata (Brazil) Eduarda Piai	6–2, 6–2
Win	18–13	Aug 2015	ITF Buenos Aires, Argentina	10,000	Clay	(Chile) Fernanda Brito	(Brazil) Nathaly Kurata (Brazil) Eduarda Piai	6–3, 6–2
Loss	18–14	Sep 2015	ITF Santa Fe, Argentina	10,000	Clay	(Argentina) Catalina Pella	(Bolivia) María Álvarez Terán (Brazil) Laura Pigossi	6–2, 2–6, [3–10]
Win	19–14	Oct 2015	ITF Bucaramanga, Colombia	25,000+H	Clay	(Bulgaria) Aleksandrina Naydenova	(Paraguay) Montserrat González (Dominican Republic) Francesca Segarelli	6–2, 7–6^{(3)}
Loss	19–15	Nov 2015	ITF Santiago, Chile	10,000	Clay	(Argentina) Catalina Pella	(Paraguay) Montserrat González (Mexico) Ana Sofía Sánchez	4–6, 6–7^{(3)}
Win	20–15	Feb 2016	ITF São Paulo, Brazil	25,000	Clay	(Argentina) Catalina Pella	(United Kingdom) Tara Moore (Switzerland) Conny Perrin	6–3, 6–1
Win	21–15	Mar 2016	ITF Curitiba, Brazil	25,000	Clay	(Argentina) Catalina Pella	(Italy) Martina Caregaro (Hungary) Réka Luca Jani	6–3, 7–6^{(5)}
Win	22–15	May 2016	Grado Tennis Cup, Italy	25,000	Clay	(Argentina) Catalina Pella	(Turkey) Başak Eraydın (Italy) Alice Matteucci	6–2, 7–6^{(8)}
Win	23–15	Mar 2017	ITF São Paulo, Brazil	25,000	Clay	(Argentina) Catalina Pella	(Brazil) Gabriela Cé (Venezuela) Andrea Gámiz	7–5, 3–6, [10–5]
Win	24–15	Apr 2017	Nana Trophy Tunis, Tunisia	60,000	Clay	(Argentina) Guadalupe Pérez Rojas	(Hungary) Ágnes Bukta (Slovakia) Vivien Juhászová	6–7^{(3)}, 6–3, [11–9]
Win	25–15	Sep 2017	Open de Saint-Malo, France	60,000	Clay	(Latvia) Diāna Marcinkēviča	(Romania) Irina Bara (Romania) Mihaela Buzărnescu	6–3, 6–3
Loss	25–16	Mar 2019	ITF Curitiba, Brazil	25,000	Clay	(Georgia (country)) Ekaterine Gorgodze	(Brazil) Paula Cristina Gonçalves (Brazil) Luisa Stefani	7–6^{(3)}, 6–7^{(0)}, [2–10]
Loss	25–17	Sep 2019	Zagreb Ladies Open, Croatia	60,000+H	Clay	(France) Amandine Hesse	(Hungary) Anna Bondár (Argentina) Paula Ormaechea	5–7, 5–7
Win	26–17	Oct 2021	ITF Rio do Sul, Brazil	25,000	Clay	(Germany) Katharina Gerlach	(Chile) Bárbara Gatica (Brazil) Rebeca Pereira	7–6^{(8)}, 6–3
Loss	26–18	Nov 2021	Copa Santiago, Chile	60,000	Clay	(Germany) Katharina Gerlach	(Netherlands) Arianne Hartono (Australia) Olivia Tjandramulia	1–6, 3–6
Win	27–18	Mar 2022	Open Medellín, Colombia	25,000	Clay	(Switzerland) Conny Perrin	(Argentina) María Lourdes Carlé (Brazil) Laura Pigossi	6–2, 5–7, [10–8]
Win	28–18	Jun 2022	ITF Périgueux, France	25,000	Clay	(Brazil) Rebeca Pereira	(United Kingdom) Emily Appleton (Australia) Alexandra Osborne	6–4, 6–1
Loss	28–19	Sep 2022	ITF Marbella, Spain	25,000	Clay	(Argentina) Julia Riera	(Spain) Jéssica Bouzas Maneiro (Spain) Leyre Romero Gormaz	4–6, 2–6
