= 2026 Como Lake Challenger =

- Date: 31 August – 6 September
- Edition: 20th
- Surface: Clay
- Location: Como, Italy

Champions

Singles
- (Croatia) Matej Dodig

Doubles
- (Croatia) Admir Kalender / (Croatia) Nino Serdarušić
- Como Lake Challenger

The 2026 Como Lake Challenger was a professional tennis tournament played on clay courts. It was the 20th edition of the tournament which was part of the 2026 ATP Challenger Tour. It took place in Como, Italy between 31 August and 6 September 2026.

== Singles main-draw entrants ==
=== Seeds ===
Country	Player	Rank^{1}	Seed
GRE	Stefanos Sakellaridis	136	1
ESP	Pedro Martínez	148	2
PER	Gonzalo Bueno	172	3
CZE	Jan Kumstát	186	4
BRA	Thiago Seyboth Wild	198	5
GER	Henri Squire	214	6
ITA	Raúl Brancaccio	223	7
ITA	Stefano Napolitano	228	8

- ^{1} Rankings are as of 24 August 2026.

=== Other entrants ===
The following players received wildcards into the singles main draw:

- (Italy) Federico Arnaboldi
- (Italy) Lorenzo Carboni
- (Italy) Juan Cruz Martin Manzano

The following players received entry into the singles main draw through the Junior Accelerator programme:

- (Switzerland) Henry Bernet
- (Germany) Max Schönhaus

The following player received entry into the singles main draw through the Next Gen Accelerator programme:

- (Czech Republic) Jan Kumstát

The following player received entry into the singles main draw as an alternate:

- (Croatia) Duje Ajduković

The following players received entry from the qualifying draw:

- (Italy) Francesco Forti
- (Slovakia) Norbert Gombos
- (Bosnia and Herzegovina) Andrej Nedić
- (Switzerland) Johan Nikles
- (Italy) Fausto Tabacco
- (Sweden) Olle Wallin

== Champions ==
=== Singles ===
- (Croatia) Matej Dodig def. (Peru) Juan Pablo Varillas 6–3, 7–6^{(7–5)}.

=== Doubles ===
- (Croatia) Admir Kalender / (Croatia) Nino Serdarušić def. (Poland) Karol Drzewiecki / (Poland) Piotr Matuszewski 6–3, 6–4.
