= Aymet Uzcátegui =

Venezuelan tennis player

- Country (sports): Venezuela
- Born: 1 December 1995 (age 30) Venezuela
- Prize money: $23,947

Singles
- Career record: 92–81
- Career titles: 0
- Highest ranking: 296 (6 November 2017)

Doubles
- Career record: 59–64
- Career titles: 5 ITF
- Highest ranking: 195 (15 October 2018)
- Current ranking: 233 (28 May 2018)

Team competitions
- Fed Cup: 8–8
Medal record
Women's tennis
Representing Venezuela
South American Games
Gold medal – first place	2018 Cochabamba	Mixed doubles
- Last updated on: 11 April 2019.

Aymet Uzcátegui (Spanish pronunciation: [ajˈmet usˈkateɣi], born 1 December 1995) is a Venezuelan tennis player.

She has won five doubles titles on the ITF Women's Circuit, and made her debut for the Venezuela Fed Cup team in 2015, currently holding an 8–8 win–loss record. Aymet has been ranked as high as 601 in singles and 195 in doubles.

== ITF finals ==
=== Singles: 1 (0–1) ===
Legend $100,000 tournaments $80,000 tournaments $60,000 tournaments $25,000 tournaments $10,000 tournaments	Finals by surface Hard (0–1) Clay (0–0) Grass (0–0) Carpet (0–0)

Result	No.	Date	Tournament	Surface	Opponent	Score
Loss	1	10 July 2016	Buca, Turkey	Hard	(Montenegro) Ana Veselinović	3–6, 4–6

=== Doubles: 9 (5–4) ===
Legend $100,000 tournaments $80,000 tournaments $60,000 tournaments $25,000 tournaments $15,000 tournaments $10,000 tournaments	Finals by surface Hard (1–2) Clay (4–2) Grass (0–0) Carpet (0–0)

Result	No.	Date	Tournament	Surface	Partner	Opponents	Score
Loss	1	29 March 2015	Antalya, Turkey	Hard	(Belgium) Dorien Cuypers	(Turkey) Ayla Aksu (Turkey) Melis Sezer	2–6, 4–6
Win	1	17 April 2015	Antalya, Turkey	Hard	(United States) Veronica Corning	(Slovakia) Vivien Juhaszová (Slovakia) Chantal Škamlová	2–6, 7–5, [10–4]
Loss	2	14 November 2015	Caracas, Venezuela	Hard	(Romania) Jaqueline Adina Cristian	(Argentina) Catalina Pella (Brazil) Laura Pigossi	7–5, 1–6, [4–10]
Loss	3	16 September 2017	Pula, Italy	Clay	(Switzerland) Aline Thommen	(Venezuela) Andrea Gámiz (Germany) Lisa Ponomar	7–5, 2–6, [6–10]
Win	2	1 July 2018	Stuttgart, Germany	Clay	(Romania) Irina Fetecău	(Bosnia and Herzegovina) Anita Husarić (Australia) Tammi Patterson	6–2, 3–6, [10–4]
Loss	4	21 July 2018	Darmstadt, Germany	Clay	(Germany) Romy Kölzer	(Italy) Martina Colmegna (Greece) Despina Papamichail	4–6, 6–3, [6–10]
Win	3	8 September 2018	Zagreb, Croatia	Clay	(Venezuela) Andrea Gámiz	(Romania) Elena Bogdan (Romania) Alexandra Cadanțu	6–3, 6–4
Win	4	14 September 2018	Varna, Bulgaria	Clay	(Romania) Gabriela Talabă	(Turkey) İpek Öz (Turkey) Melis Sezer	3–6, 7–5, [10–5]
Win	5	22 September 2018	Dobrich, Bulgaria	Clay	(Romania) Cristina Dinu	(Romania) Elena-Gabriela Ruse (Romania) Jaqueline Adina Cristian	7–6^{(7–3)}, 6–2
