= Charlotte Römer =

Ecuadorian tennis player

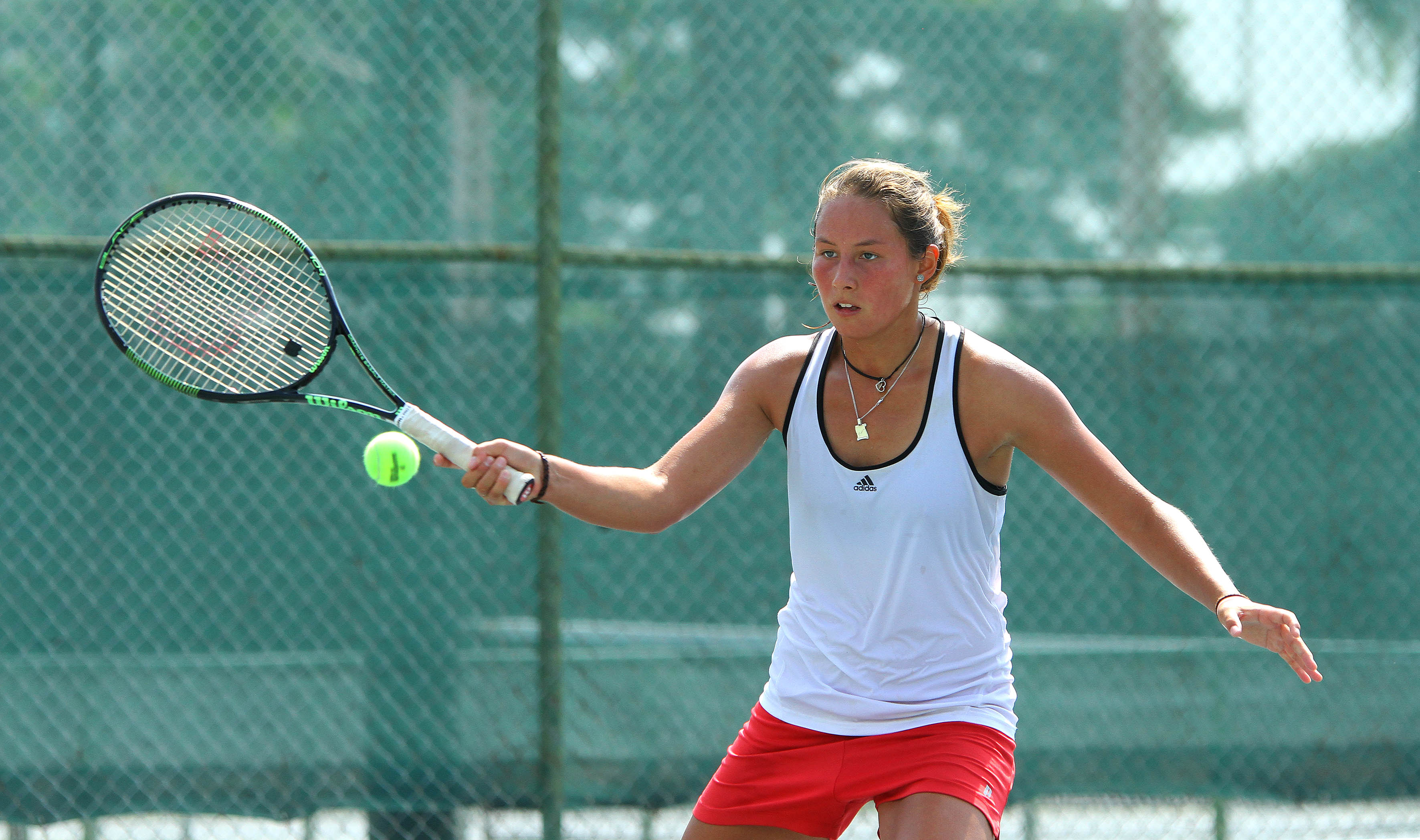
- Römer during the 2015 Fed Cup
- Full name: Charlotte Römer Paredes
- Country (sports): Ecuador
- Born: 8 January 1994 (age 32) Baños de Agua Santa
- Height: 1.71 m (5 ft 7 in)
- Plays: Right (two-handed backhand)
- Prize money: $40,708

Singles
- Career record: 145–121
- Career titles: 1 ITF
- Highest ranking: No. 539 (9 September 2019)

Doubles
- Career record: 134–97
- Career titles: 10 ITF
- Highest ranking: No. 424 (15 May 2017)

Team competitions
- Fed Cup: 16–18
Medal record
Representing Ecuador
Women's Tennis
South American Games
Bronze medal – third place	2018 Cochabamba	Women's doubles

Charlotte Römer Paredes (born 8 January 1994) is an Ecuadorian former tennis player of German descent.

In her career, she won one singles title and ten doubles titles on the ITF Women's Circuit. On 9 September 2019, she reached a career-high singles ranking of world No. 539. On 15 May 2017, she peaked at No. 424 in the doubles rankings.

Playing for the Ecuador Fed Cup team, Römer has a win–loss record of 16–18.

She currently works as a tennis teacher and runs her own tennis school in Würenlos, Switzerland.

== ITF Circuit finals ==
=== Singles: 3 (1 title, 2 runner-ups) ===
Legend $25,000 tournaments $15,000 tournaments	Finals by surface Hard (0–0) Clay (1–2)

Result	No.	Date	Tournament	Surface	Opponent	Score
Loss	1.	29 April 2018	ITF Cairo, Egypt	Clay	(Romania) Irina Fetecău	1–6, 1–6
Win	1.	16 September 2018	ITF Cairo, Egypt	Clay	(Egypt) Lamis Alhussein Abdel Aziz	6–3, 6–4
Loss	2.	30 September 2018	ITF Cairo, Egypt	Clay	(Italy) Michele Alexandra Zmau	3–6, 6–4, 4–6

=== Doubles: 25 (10 titles, 15 runner-ups) ===
Legend $25,000 tournaments $10/15,000 tournaments	Finals by surface Hard (3–3) Clay (7–12)

Result	No.	Date	Tier	Tournament	Surface	Partner	Opponents	Score
Loss	1.	25 June 2012	10,000	ITF Melilla, Spain	Hard	(Spain) Mariona del Peral Francín	(Argentina) Tatiana Búa (Argentina) Melina Ferrero	5–7, 2–6
Loss	2.	8 July 2013	10,000	ITF Getxo, Spain	Clay	(Australia) Ashley Keir	(Sweden) Jacqueline Cabaj Awad (Sweden) Cornelia Lister	2–6, 4–6
Loss	3.	25 November 2013	10,000	ITF Fes, Morocco	Clay	(Morocco) Nadia Lalami	(Australia) Alexandra Nancarrow (Spain) Olga Parres Azcoitia	6–7^{(2)}, 3–6
Loss	4.	9 June 2014	10,000	ITF Madrid, Spain	Clay	(Spain) Olga Sáez Larra	(Spain) Yvonne Cavallé Reimers (Spain) Lucía Cervera Vázquez	2–6, 6–4, [5–10]
Win	1.	7 July 2014	10,000	ITF Getxo, Spain	Clay	(Spain) Olga Sáez Larra	(Australia) Alexandra Nancarrow (Spain) Olga Parres Azcoitia	6–4, 7–5
Win	2.	13 April 2015	10,000	ITF Ponta Delgada, Portugal	Hard	(Portugal) Maria Palhoto	(France) Amandine Cazeaux (Germany) Katharina Hering	3–6, 6–3, [10–6]
Win	3.	20 April 2015	10,000	ITF Ponta Delgada, Portugal	Hard	(Portugal) Maria Palhoto	(Spain) Georgina García Pérez (Spain) Olga Parres Azcoitia	7–5, 3–6, [10–0]
Loss	5.	29 June 2015	10,000	ITF Amarante, Portugal	Hard	(Spain) María Martínez Martínez	(Spain) Olga Parres Azcoitia (Bulgaria) Julia Stamatova	4–6, 3–6
Win	4.	23 November 2015	10,000	ITF Nules, Spain	Clay	(Spain) Olga Sáez Larra	(Spain) Ariadna Martí Riembau (Spain) Marta Sexmilo Pascual	6–2, 6–3
Loss	6.	11 April 2016	10,000	ITF Hammamet, Tunisia	Clay	(Portugal) Maria Palhoto	(Canada) Petra Januskova (Italy) Angelica Moratelli	6–7^{(7)}, 5–7
Loss	7.	13 June 2016	10,000	ITF Alkmaar, Netherlands	Clay	(Germany) Caroline Werner	(Germany) Luisa Marie Huber (Belgium) Hélène Scholsen	w/o
Loss	8.	20 June 2016	10,000	ITF Kaltenkirchen, Germany	Clay	(Hungary) Bianka Békefi	(Germany) Katharina Hobgarski (Germany) Julia Wachaczyk	4–6, 2–6
Win	5.	25 July 2016	10,000	ITF El Espinar, Spain	Clay	(Germany) Sarah-Rebecca Sekulic	(France) Jessika Ponchet (Romania) Ioana Loredana Roșca	6–2, 7–6^{(4)}
Win	6.	8 August 2016	10,000	ITF Las Palmas, Spain	Clay	(Spain) Yvonne Cavallé Reimers	(Spain) Arabela Fernández Rabener (Spain) Almudena Sanz Llaneza Fernández	6–4, 6–4
Loss	9.	15 August 2016	10,000	ITF Las Palmas, Spain	Clay	(Spain) Yvonne Cavallé Reimers	(Sweden) Jacqueline Cabaj Awad (France) Marine Partaud	6–1, 5–7, [8–10]
Win	7.	19 September 2016	10,000	ITF Madrid, Spain	Hard	(Spain) Arabela Fernández Rabener	(Spain) Ainhoa Atucha Gómez (Spain) María José Luque Moreno	6–2, 2–6, [10–4]
Loss	10.	7 November 2016	10,000	ITF Vinaròs, Spain	Clay	(Venezuela) Andrea Gámiz	(Ukraine) Oleksandra Korashvili (Romania) Ioana Loredana Roșca	4–6, 6–7^{(2)}
Win	8.	14 November 2016	10,000	ITF Benicarló, Spain	Clay	(United Kingdom) Amanda Carreras	(Ukraine) Oleksandra Korashvili (Australia) Isabelle Wallace	5–7, 6–3, [10–7]
Win	9.	5 December 2016	10,000	ITF Nules, Spain	Clay	(Spain) Olga Sáez Larra	(Ukraine) Oleksandra Korashvili (Brazil) Laura Pigossi	6–4, 6–2
Loss	11.	17 February 2017	15,000	ITF Manacor, Spain	Clay	(Spain) Yvonne Cavallé Reimers	(Spain) Olga Sáez Larra (Spain) María Teresa Torró Flor	3–6, 2–6
Loss	12.	1 April 2017	15,000	ITF Hammamet, Tunisia	Clay	(Australia) Isabelle Wallace	(Spain) Irene Burillo Escorihuela (Spain) Yvonne Cavallé Reimers	4–6, 3–6
Loss	13.	11 November 2017	15,000	ITF Vinaròs, Spain	Clay	(India) Snehadevi Reddy	(Japan) Misa Eguchi (Japan) Akiko Omae	2–6, 2–6
Win	10.	10 December 2017	25,000	ITF Nules, Spain	Clay	(Spain) Olga Sáez Larra	(Netherlands) Cindy Burger (Russia) Yana Sizikova	2–6, 6–1, [10–7]
Loss	14.	17 March 2018	15,000	ITF Ramat HaSharon, Israel	Hard	(Germany) Caroline Werner	(United Kingdom) Alicia Barnett (United Kingdom) Olivia Nicholls	4–6, 6–7^{(4)}
Loss	15.	29 September 2018	15,000	ITF Cairo, Egypt	Clay	(United States) Joelle Kissell	(Egypt) Lamis Alhussein Abdel Aziz (Egypt) Farah Abdel-Wahab	4–6, 6–7^{(4)}
