= Montserrat González =

Paraguayan tennis player

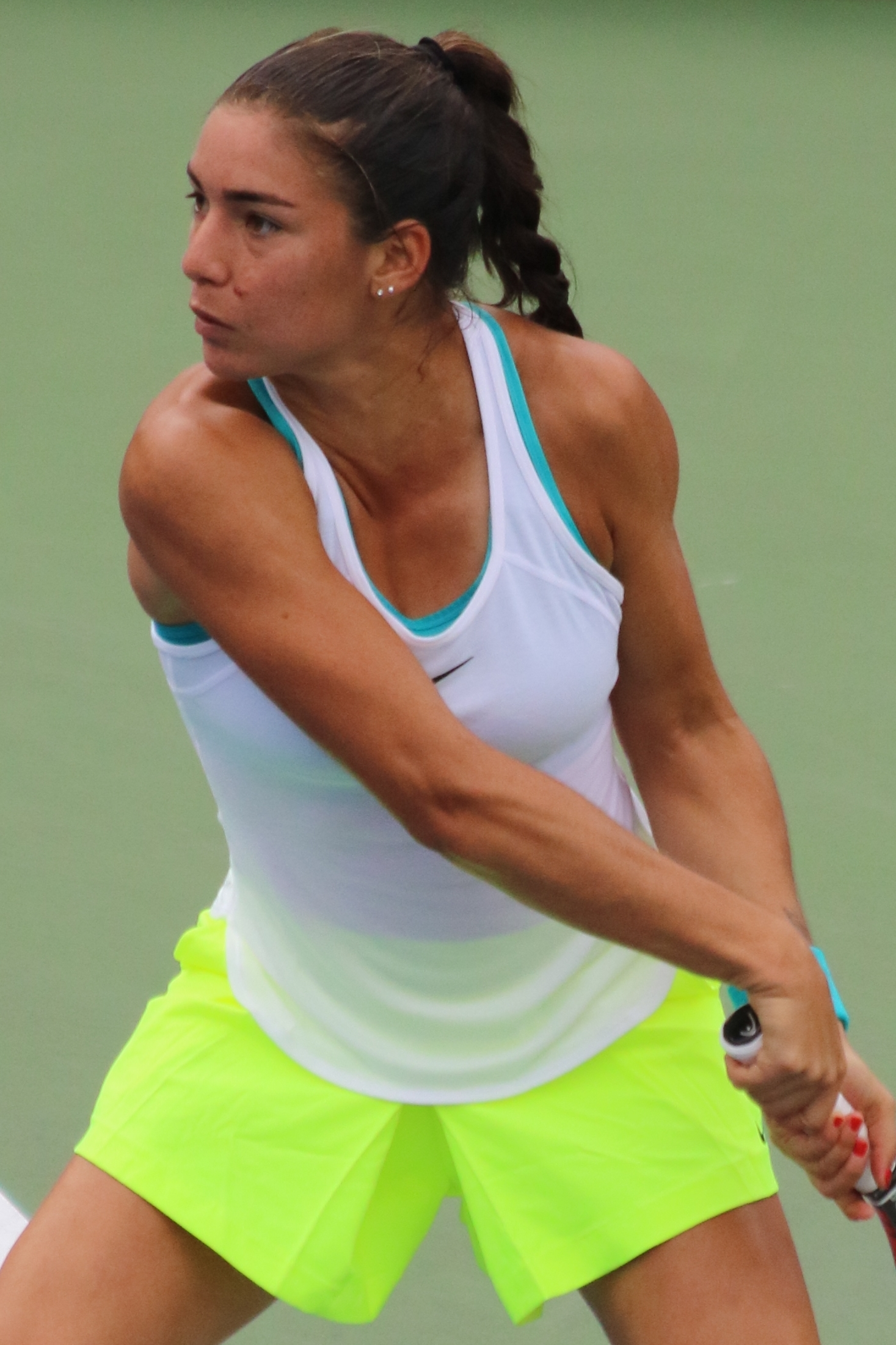
- González at the 2016 US Open
- Full name: Montserrat González Benítez
- Country (sports): Paraguay
- Born: 1 July 1994 (age 31) Asunción, Paraguay
- Height: 1.70 m (5 ft 7 in)
- Retired: 2021
- Prize money: US$ 230,084

Singles
- Career record: 220–145
- Career titles: 11 ITF
- Highest ranking: No. 150 (12 September 2016)

Grand Slam singles results
- French Open: Q2 (2017)
- Wimbledon: Q1 (2017)
- US Open: 2R (2016)

Doubles
- Career record: 123–90
- Career titles: 8 ITF
- Highest ranking: No. 170 (19 June 2017)

Team competitions
- Fed Cup: 42–20
Medal record
Representing Paraguay
Pan American Games
Silver medal – second place	2019 Lima	Women's doubles
South American Games
Gold medal – first place	2018 Cochabamba	Women's singles
Silver medal – second place	2014 Santiago	Women's doubles
Silver medal – second place	2018 Cochabamba	Women's doubles

Montserrat González Benítez (Latin American Spanish: [monseˈrat ɣonˈsales βeˈnites]; (Note: In isolation, Benítez is pronounced [beˈnites].) born 1 July 1994) is a Paraguayan former tennis player.

In her career, González won eleven singles titles and eight doubles titles on the ITF Women's Circuit. On 12 September 2016, she reached a career-high singles ranking of world No. 150. On 19 June 2017, she peaked at No. 170 in the doubles rankings.

Playing for the Paraguay Fed Cup team, González has a win–loss record of 42–20.

She announced her retirement from professional tennis in 2021.

== ITF Circuit finals ==
=== Singles: 18 (11 titles, 7 runner-ups) ===
Legend $50,000 tournaments $25,000 tournaments $10/15,000 tournaments	Finals by surface Hard (4–2) Clay (7–5)

Result	W–L	Date	Tournament	Tier	Surface	Opponent	Score
Loss	0–1	Apr 2013	ITF São Paulo, Brazil	10,000	Clay	(Brazil) Roxane Vaisemberg	4–6, 2–6
Win	1–1	Apr 2013	ITF Villa Allende, Argentina	10,000	Clay	(Argentina) Constanza Vega	6–4, 6–1
Win	2–1	May 2013	ITF Villa María, Argentina	10,000	Clay	(Chile) Camila Silva	6–3, 4–6, 6–3
Win	3–1	May 2013	ITF Quintana Roo, Mexico	10,000	Hard	(Mexico) Ana Sofía Sánchez	4–6, 7–6^{(4)}, 7–6^{(1)}
Loss	3–2	Jun 2013	ITF Quintana Roo, Mexico	10,000	Hard	(Mexico) Ana Sofía Sánchez	3–6, 2–6
Win	4–2	Jul 2013	ITF São José dos Campos, Brazil	10,000	Clay	(Brazil) Laura Pigossi	6–3, 6–2
Win	5–2	Sep 2013	ITF Lambaré, Paraguay	10,000	Clay	(United States) Lauren Albanese	6–2, 6–1
Win	6–2	Dec 2013	ITF Mata de São João, Brazil	25,000	Clay	(Argentina) Catalina Pella	6–3, 6–1
Loss	6–3	Apr 2014	Charlottesville Open, US	50,000	Clay	(United States) Taylor Townsend	2–6, 3–6
Loss	6–4	Sep 2015	ITF Monterrey, Mexico	50,000	Hard	(Belgium) Ysaline Bonaventure	1–6, 2–6
Loss	6–5	Oct 2015	ITF Bucaramanga, Colombia	25,000	Clay	(Chile) Daniela Seguel	7–6^{(0)}, 3–6, 4–6
Win	7–5	Jan 2016	ITF Guarujá, Brazil	25,000	Hard	(Romania) Sorana Cîrstea	1–6, 7–6^{(5)}, 6–2
Loss	7–6	Jun 2016	Montpellier Open, France	25,000	Clay	(Switzerland) Jil Teichmann	2–6, 6–7^{(6)}
Loss	7–7	Sep 2017	ITF Charleston Pro, US	15,000	Clay	(Czech Republic) Michaela Bayerlová	6–2, 3–6, 3–6
Win	8–7	Dec 2017	ITF Luque, Paraguay	15,000	Hard	(Russia) Nika Kukharchuk	1–6, 6–3, 6–0
Win	9–7	Mar 2018	ITF Hammamet, Tunisia	15,000	Clay	(Bulgaria) Isabella Shinikova	7–6^{(4)}, 6–2
Win	10–7	Apr 2018	ITF Hammamet, Tunisia	15,000	Clay	(Croatia) Lea Bošković	2–6, 6–2, 6–2
Win	11–7	Mar 2019	ITF Cancún, Mexico	15,000	Hard	(United Kingdom) Emily Appleton	6–7^{(2)}, 6–1, 6–3

=== Doubles: 16 (8 titles, 8 runner-ups) ===
Legend $60,000 tournaments $25,000 tournaments $15,000 tournaments $10,000 tournaments	Finals by surface Hard (1–2) Clay (7–6)

Result	W–L	Date	Tournament	Tier	Surface	Partner	Opponents	Score
Win	1–0	Apr 2013	ITF Villa Allende, Argentina	10,000	Clay	(Paraguay) Sara Giménez	(Argentina) Victoria Bosio (Argentina) Aranza Salut	6–4, 6–0
Loss	1–1	Jun 2013	ITF Quintana Roo, Mexico	10,000	Hard	(Argentina) Victoria Bosio	(United States) Macall Harkins (United States) Zoë Gwen Scandalis	4–6, 6–3, [6–10]
Loss	1–2	Sep 2013	ITF Lambaré, Paraguay	10,000	Clay	(Paraguay) Sara Giménez	(Argentina) Carla Bruzzesi Avella (Argentina) Carolina Zeballos	2–6, 5–7
Loss	1–3	Dec 2013	ITF Mata de São João, Brazil	25,000	Clay	(Argentina) Carolina Zeballos	(Brazil) Paula Cristina Gonçalves (Brazil) Laura Pigossi	2–6, 2–6
Win	2–3	Aug 2015	ITF San Luis Potosí, Mexico	15,000	Hard	(Mexico) Ana Sofía Sánchez	(Brazil) Maria Fernanda Alves (Brazil) Laura Pigossi	4–6, 6–3, [10–8]
Loss	2–4	Oct 2015	ITF Bucaramanga, Colombia	25,000+H	Clay	(Dominican Republic) Francesca Segarelli	(Bulgaria) Aleksandrina Naydenova (Chile) Daniela Seguel	2–6, 6–7^{(3)}
Win	3–4	Nov 2015	ITF Santiago, Chile	10,000	Clay	(Mexico) Ana Sofía Sánchez	(Argentina) Catalina Pella (Chile) Daniela Seguel	6–4, 7–6^{(3)}
Loss	3–5	May 2017	Open Saint-Gaudens, France	60,000	Clay	(Spain) Sílvia Soler Espinosa	(Chinese Taipei) Chang Kai-chen (China) Han Xinyun	5–7, 1–6
Loss	3–6	Jun 2017	Internazionali di Brescia, Italy	60,000	Clay	(Belarus) Ilona Kremen	(Israel) Julia Glushko (Australia) Priscilla Hon	6–2, 6–7^{(4)}, [8–10]
Win	4–6	Jun 2017	Internacional de Barcelona, Spain	60,000	Clay	(Spain) Sílvia Soler Espinosa	(Israel) Julia Glushko (Australia) Priscilla Hon	6–4, 6–3
Loss	4–7	Dec 2017	ITF Luque, Paraguay	15,000	Hard	(Mexico) Ana Sofía Sánchez	(Brazil) Thaisa Grana Pedretti (Bolivia) Noelia Zeballos	2–6, 4–6
Win	5–7	Mar 2018	ITF Hammamet, Tunisia	15,000	Clay	(Brazil) Laura Pigossi	(Italy) Camilla Scala (Bulgaria) Isabella Shinikova	6–2, 6–0
Loss	5–8	Apr 2018	ITF Hammamet, Tunisia	15,000	Clay	(United States) Jessica Ho	(Hungary) Vanda Lukács (Germany) Natalia Siedliska	4–6, 5–7
Win	6–8	Jun 2018	ITF Madrid, Spain	25,000	Clay (i)	(China) Wang Xiyu	(Russia) Anastasia Pribylova (Romania) Raluca Șerban	6–4, 7–6^{(4)}
Win	7–8	Jul 2018	ITF Porto, Portugal	25,000	Clay	(Brazil) Laura Pigossi	(Spain) Cristina Bucșa (Japan) Ramu Ueda	7–5, 6–0
Win	8–8	Aug 2019	ITF Lambaré, Paraguay	15,000	Clay	(Bolivia) Noelia Zeballos	(Chile) Fernanda Brito (Argentina) Sofía Luini	6–0, 6–4

== Junior Grand Slam final ==
=== Girls' doubles ===
Result	Year	Tournament	Surface	Partner	Opponents	Score
Loss	2012	French Open	Clay	(Brazil) Beatriz Haddad Maia	(Russia) Daria Gavrilova (Russia) Irina Khromacheva	6–4, 4–6, [8–10]
