= Greece at the 2018 Mediterranean Games =

- IOC code: GRE
- NOC: Hellenic Olympic Committee

in Taragona
- Competitors: 299 in 28 sports
- Flag bearer: Evangelia Psarra
- Medals Ranked 5th: Gold 12 Silver 14 Bronze 22 Total 48

Mediterranean Games appearances (overview)
- 1951; 1955; 1959; 1963; 1967; 1971; 1975; 1979; 1983; 1987; 1991; 1993; 1997; 2001; 2005; 2009; 2013; 2018; 2022; 2026

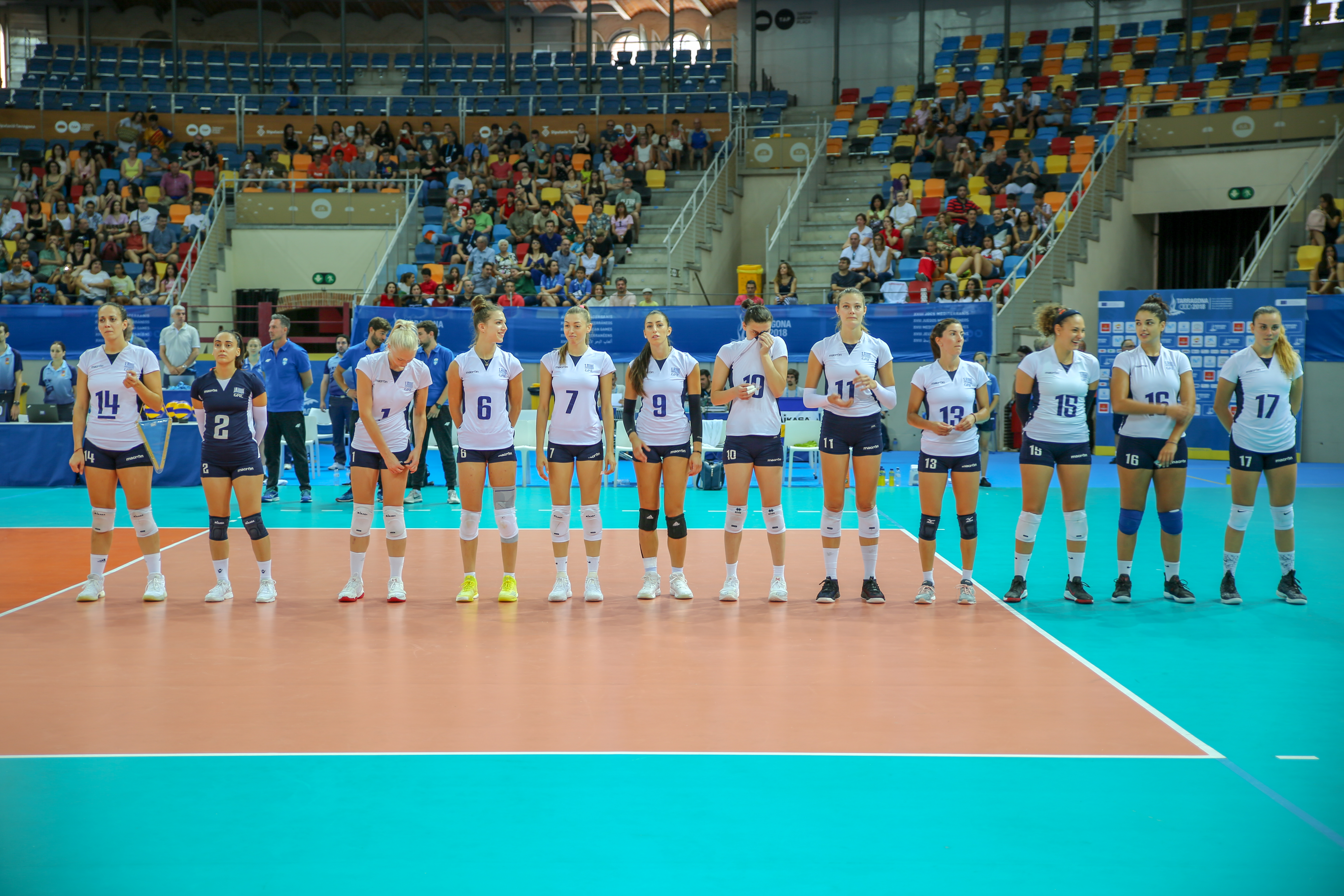
Women's Volleyball at the 2018 Mediterranean Games (silver)

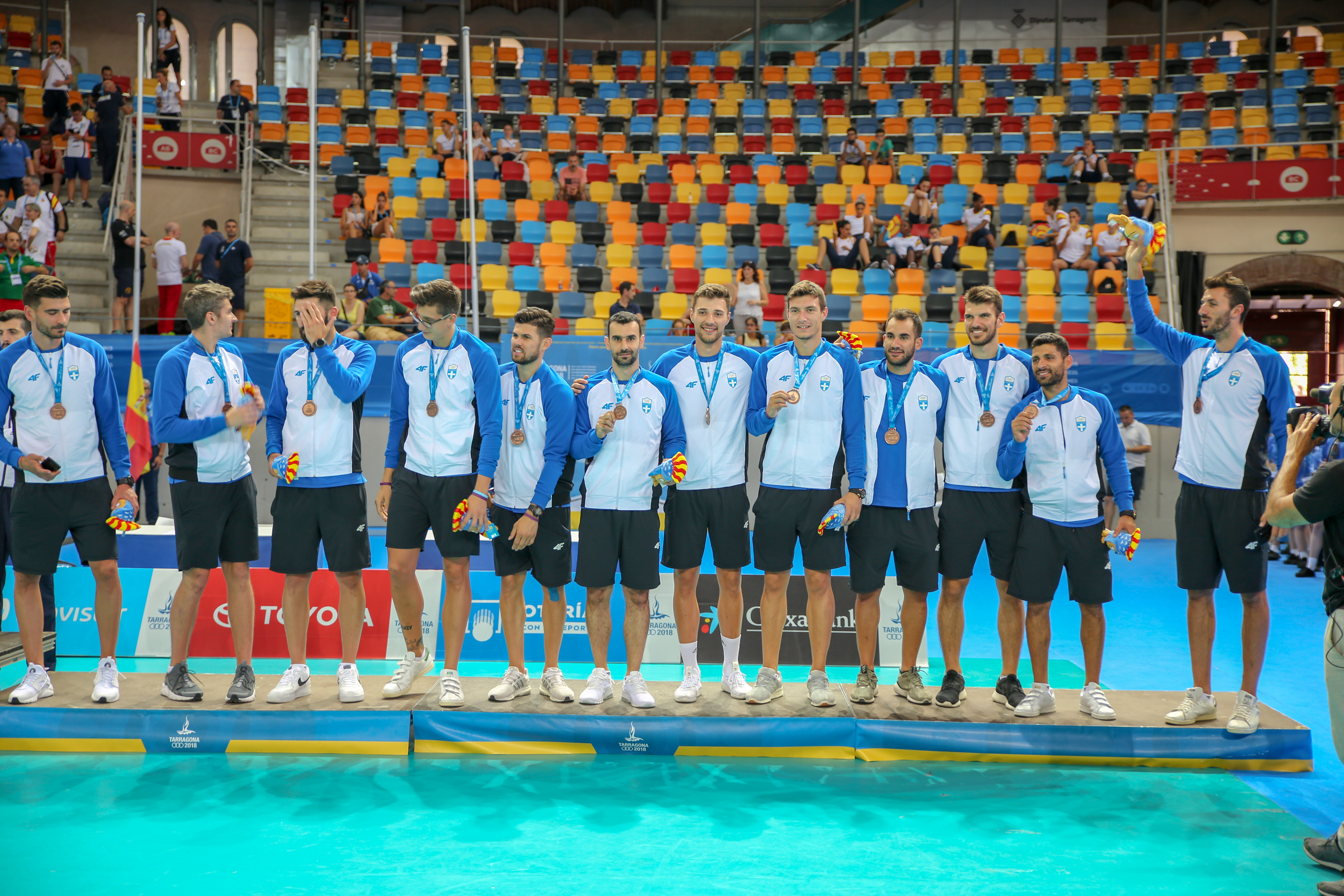
Men's Volleyball at the 2018 Mediterranean Games (bronze)

Greece competes at the 2018 Mediterranean Games in Taragona, Spain from 22 June to 1 July 2018.

== Medal summary ==
=== Medal table ===
Medal	Name	Sport	Event	Date
Gold	Anna Korakaki	Shooting	10 m air pistol	23 June
Gold	Andreas Vazaios	Swimming	200 m individual medley	23 June
Gold	Apostolos Christou; Kristian Golomeev; Fotios Koliopoulos; Andreas Vazaios	Swimming	4 × 100 m medley relay	23 June
Gold	Konstantina Benteli	Weightlifting	−58 kg Snatch	24 June
Gold	Kristian Golomeev	Swimming	50 m butterfly	24 June
Gold	Apostolos Christou	Swimming	100 m backstroke	24 June
Gold	Kristian Golomeev	Swimming	50 m freestyle	25 June
Gold	Theodoros Iakovidis	Weightlifting	−94 kg Clean & jerk	26 June
Gold	Maria Prevolaraki	wrestling	−53 kg	27 June
Gold	Athanasia Fakidi	Sailing	Laser Radial	29 June
Gold	Aikaterini Nikolaidou	Rowing	Single sculls	30 June
Gold	Stefanos Ntouskos; Christos Stergiakas	Rowing	Double sculls	30 June
Silver	Eleni Chatziliadou	Karate	+68 kg	24 June
Silver	Konstantina Benteli	Weightlifting	−58 kg Clean & jerk	24 June
Silver	Apostolos Christou; Kristian Golomeev; Ioannis Karpouzlis; Andreas Vazaios	Swimming	4 × 100 m freestyle	25 June
Silver	Dimitrios Aslanidis	Weightlifting	−85 kg Snatch	26 June
Silver	Theodoros Iakovidis	Weightlifting	−94 kg Snatch	26 June
Silver	Rafailía Spanoudaki-Hatziriga	Athletics	100 m	28 June
Silver	Konstantinos Baniotis	Athletics	High jump	29 June
Silver	Elisavet Pesiridou	Athletics	100 m hurdles	29 June
Silver	Thomais Emmanouilidou	Rowing	Lightweight single sculls	30 June
Silver	Ioannis Marokos; Ninos Nikolaidis	Rowing	Lightweight double sculls	30 June
Silver	Eleni Kelaiditi	Rhythmic gymnastics	All-around	30 June
Silver	Konstantinos Chamalidis	Taekwondo	−68 kg	30 June
Silver	Greek women's team	Volleyball	Women's tournament	1 July
Silver	Greek men's team	Water polo	Men's tournament	30 June
Bronze	Apostolos Christou	Swimming	50 m backstroke	23 June
Bronze	Theodora Drakou	Swimming	50 m backstroke	23 June
Bronze	Anna Ntountounaki	Swimming	100 m butterfly	23 June
Bronze	Apostolos Christou	Swimming	200 m backstroke	25 June
Bronze	Theodora Drakou	Swimming	50 m freestyle	25 June
Bronze	Stefanos Dimitriadis	Swimming	200 m butterfly	25 June
Bronze	Andreas Vazaios	Swimming	200 m butterfly	25 June
Bronze	Vasiliki Stavroula Baka; Theodora Drakou; Maria Thalia Drasidou; Anna Ntountounaki	Swimming	4 × 100 m medley relay	25 June
Bronze	Dimitrios Tsekeridis	wrestling	Greco-Roman −87 kg	25 June
Bronze	Despina Georgiadou	Fencing	Individual sabre	25 June
Bronze	Dimitrios Aslanidis	Weightlifting	−85 kg Clean & jerk	26 June
Bronze	Alexios Ntanatsidis	Judo	−81 kg	28 June
Bronze	Theodoros Tselidis	Judo	−90 kg	28 June
Bronze	Chrysoula Anagnostopoulou	Athletics	Discus throw	28 June
Bronze	Nikoleta Kyriakopoulou	Athletics	Pole vault	28 June
Bronze	Alexandros Tsanikidis	Boxing	Light welterweight	29 June
Bronze	Polyneikis Kalamaras	Boxing	Light heavyweight	29 June
Bronze	Spyridon Giannaros	Rowing	Lightweight single sculls	30 June
Bronze	Spyridon Kalentzis	Rowing	Single sculls	30 June
Bronze	Konstantinos Douvalidis	Athletics	110 m hurdles	30 June
Bronze	Greek women's team	Water polo	Women's tournament	30 June
Bronze	Greek men's team	Volleyball	Men's tournament	30 June

Medals by sport
Sport	1st place, gold medalist(s)	2nd place, silver medalist(s)	3rd place, bronze medalist(s)	Total
Athletics	0	3	3	6
Boxing	0	0	2	2
Fencing	0	0	1	1
Rhythmic Gymnastics	0	1	0	1
Judo	0	0	2	2
Karate	0	1	0	1
Rowing	2	2	2	6
Sailing	1	0	0	1
Shooting	1	0	0	1
Swimming	5	1	8	14
Taekwondo	0	1	0	1
Volleyball	0	1	1	2
Water polo	0	1	1	2
Weightlifting	2	3	1	6
wrestling	1	0	1	2
Total	12	14	22	48

Medals by date
Day	Date	1st place, gold medalist(s)	2nd place, silver medalist(s)	3rd place, bronze medalist(s)	Total
1	23 June	2	1	3	6
2	24 June	3	2	0	5
3	25 June	2	0	7	9
4	26 June	1	2	1	4
5	27 June	1	0	0	1
6	28 June	0	1	4	5
7	29 June	1	2	2	5
8	30 June	2	4	5	11
9	1 July	0	2	0	2
Total		12	14	22	48

Medals by gender
Gender	1st place, gold medalist(s)	2nd place, silver medalist(s)	3rd place, bronze medalist(s)	Total
Male	7	7	14	28
Female	5	7	8	20
Total	12	14	22	48

== Archery ==
=== Men ===
Athlete	Event	Ranking round		Round of 64	Round of 32	Round of 16	Quarterfinals	Semifinals	Final / BM	
Athlete	Event	Score	Seed	Opposition Score	Opposition Score	Opposition Score	Opposition Score	Opposition Score	Opposition Score	Rank
Christos Aerikos	Individual	609	28	Janevski (MKD); W 7–1	Pasqualucci (ITA); W 6–2	Gulacar (TUR); L 3–7	Did not advance			
Vasileios Kalogiannis	Individual	609	27	Hoxha (ALB); W 6–0	Galiazzo (ITA); L 1–7	Did not advance				
Alexandros Karageorgiou	Individual	635	18	Bye	Tolba (EGY); W 6–2	Strajhar (SLO); L 4–6	Did not advance			
Christos Aerikos; Vasileios Kalogiannis; Alexandros Karageorgiou	Team	—N/a		—N/a	—N/a	Bye	Italy (ITA); L 0–6	Did not advance		

=== Women ===
Athlete	Event	Ranking round		Round of 32	Round of 16	Quarterfinals	Semifinals	Final / BM	
Athlete	Event	Score	Seed	Opposition Score	Opposition Score	Opposition Score	Opposition Score	Opposition Score	Rank
Anatoli Martha Gkorila	Individual	614	13	Hadjierotokritou (CYP); W 6–5	Cruz (ESP); L 2–6	Did not advance			
Maria Papandreopoulou	Individual	590	17	Psarra (GRE); L 2–6	Did not advance				
Evangelia Psarra	Individual	602	16	Papandreopoulou (GRE); W 6–2	Anagoz (TUR); L 0–6	Did not advance			
Anatoli Martha Gkorila; Maria Papandreopoulou; Evangelia Psarra	Team	—N/a		—N/a	Bye	France (FRA); L 4–5	Did not advance		

== Athletics ==
Key
Note–Ranks given for track events are within the athlete's heat only
Q = Qualified for the next round
q = Qualified for the next round as a fastest loser or, in field events, by position without achieving the qualifying target
NR = National record
N/A = Round not applicable for the event
Bye = Athlete not required to compete in round

=== Men ===
Track & road events

Athlete	Event	Semifinal		Final	
Athlete	Event	Result	Rank	Result	Rank
Efthymios Stergioulis	100 m	10.89	12	Did not advance	
Ioannis Nyfantopoulos	100 m	10.64	5 Q	DQ	
Panagiotis Trivyzas	200 m	20.78	6 Q	21.06	6
Christos Kotitsas	800 m	1:52.22	14	Did not advance	
Andreas Dimitrakis	1500 m	3:46.17	10 Q	3:51.12	12
Georgios Michalis Tassis	5000 m	—N/a		14:38:33	13
Markos Gkourilias	5000 m	—N/a		13:59:59	7
Konstantinos Douvalidis	110 m hurdles	—N/a		13.67	3rd place, bronze medalist(s)
Konstantinos Nakos	400 m hurdles	51.65	13	Did not advance	
Nikolaos Gkotsis	3000 m steeplechase	—N/a		9:14.90	13
Christos Kallias	Half marathon	—N/a		DNF	
Konstantinos Gkelaouzos	Half marathon	—N/a		1:13:12.00	16
Konstadinos Douvalidis; Efthymios Stergioulis; Panagiotis Trivyzas; Ioannis Nyfantopoulos; Konstantinos Zikos	4 × 100 m relay	—N/a		39.72	5

Field events

Athlete	Event	Qualification		Final	
Athlete	Event	Distance	Position	Distance	Position
Konstantinos Baniotis	High jump	—N/a		2.23	2nd place, silver medalist(s)
Anastasios Galazoulas	Long jump	7.36	14	Did not advance	
Michail Mertzanidis Despoteris	Long jump	7.88	2 Q	7.73	8
Anastasios Latiflaris	Shot put	18.50	8 Q	18.84	9
Kyriakos Zotos	Shot put	17.16	15	Did not advance	
Georgios Tremos	Discus throw	56.68	5 Q	57.84	7
Iason Thanopoulos	Discus throw	50.15	13	Did not advance	

=== Women ===
Track & road events

Athlete	Event	Semifinal		Final	
Athlete	Event	Result	Rank	Result	Rank
Rafailía Spanoudaki-Hatziriga	100 m	11.56	2 Q	11.53	2nd place, silver medalist(s)
Grigoria Keramida	200 m	23.79	8 Q	23.90	8
Irini Vasiliou	400 m	53.07	6 Q	53.20	7
Anna Vasileiou	400 m	53.65	11	Did not advance	
Konstantina Giannopoulou	800 m	2:04.99	8 Q	2:12.72	8
Athina Koini	1500 m	—N/a		4:30.65	11
Koraini Kyriakopoulou	1500 m	—N/a		4:26.15	10
Anastasia Karakatsani	5000 m	—N/a		16:57.87	7
Elisavet Pesiridou	100 m hurdles	13.41	3 Q	13.30	2nd place, silver medalist(s)
Elpida Toka	400 m hurdles	59.69	8 Q	59.28	8
Effrosyni Theodorou	400 m hurdles	59.66	7 Q	59.02	7
Eleftheria Petroulaki	Half marathon	—N/a		1:21:59.00	8
Elisavet Pesiridou; Rafailía Spanoudaki-Hatziriga; Grigoria Emmanouela Keramida; Kyriaki Samani; Aikaterini Sarri	4 × 100 m relay	—N/a		45.11	5

Field events

Athlete	Event	Final	
Athlete	Event	Distance	Position
Nikoleta Kyriakopoulou	Pole Vault	4.31	3rd place, bronze medalist(s)
Haido Alexouli	Long jump	6.39	8
Kristina Alvertsian	Triple jump	12.69	9
Chrysoula Anagnostopoulou	Discus throw	58.85	3rd place, bronze medalist(s)
Aikaterini Vamvoukaki	Shot put	60.62	8

== Badminton ==
=== Men ===
Athlete	Event	Round of 32	Round of 16	Quarterfinal	Semifinal	Final / BM	
Athlete	Event	Opposition Score	Opposition Score	Opposition Score	Opposition Score	Opposition Score	Rank
Stamatis Tsigkirdakis	Men's singles	Jallad (SYR); W 2–0	Atilano (POR); L 0–2	Did not advance			
Ilias Xanthou	Men's singles	Bye	Kurt (TUR); L 0–2	Did not advance			
Georgios Galvas; Panagiotis Skarlatos	Men's doubles	—N/a	Doder / Milic (SRB); L 1–2	Did not advance			

=== Women ===
Athlete	Event	Round of 32	Round of 16	Quarterfinal	Semifinal	Final / BM	
Athlete	Event	Opposition Score	Opposition Score	Opposition Score	Opposition Score	Opposition Score	Rank
Grammatoula Sotiriou	Women's singles	Mair (ITA); W 2–0	Christodoulou (CYP); W 2–1	Demirbag (TUR); L 0–2	Did not advance		
Polyvia Tzika	Women's singles	Bye	Hoyaux (FRA); L 0–2	Did not advance			
Grammatoula Sotiriou; Polyvia Tzika	Women's doubles	—N/a	Arboleya / Vejo (ESP); L 0–2	Did not advance			

== Basketball 3X3 ==
=== Men's tournament ===
Team

- Sarantis Mastrogiannopoulos
- Konstantinos Oikonomopoulos
- Nikolaos Persidis
- Andreas Rekouniotis

==== Group D ====
Team	Pts	W	L	PF	PA	Diff	Qualification
Slovenia	4	2	0	42	33	9	Quarterfinal
Greece	2	1	1	36	39	-3	Quarterfinal
Spain	0	0	2	35	39	-4	

27 June 2018
10:40

Greece	16–21	Slovenia

Camp de Mart Auditorium

27 June 2018
12:40

Spain	18–20	Greece

Camp de Mart Auditorium

==== Quarterfinal ====
29 June 2018
18:00

Serbia	13–19	Greece

Camp de Mart Auditorium

==== Semifinal ====
29 June 2018
19:20

Italy	21–17	Greece

Camp de Mart Auditorium

==== Bronze-medal match ====
29 June 2018
20:00

Slovenia	18–11	Greece

Camp de Mart Auditorium

Team	Rank
Greece	Fourth place

=== Women's tournament ===
Team

- Vasiliki Souzana Karampatsa
- Anastasia Ntaolengk Nixina
- Garyfallia Paraskevi Ntanou
- Georgia Stamati

==== Group A ====
Team	Pts	W	L	PF	PA	Diff	Qualification
Spain	8	4	0	70	37	33	Semifinal
Portugal	4	2	2	40	38	2	Semifinal
Greece	4	2	2	55	55	0	
Slovenia	2	1	3	52	59	-7	
Andorra	2	1	3	43	71	-28	

27 June 2018
12:20

Slovenia	9–13	Greece

Camp de Mart Auditorium

27 June 2018
17:40

Spain	21–14	Greece

Camp de Mart Auditorium

27 June 2018
18:40

Greece	16–12	Andorra

Camp de Mart Auditorium

28 June 2018
19:20

Greece	12–13	Portugal

Camp de Mart Auditorium

== Boxing ==
=== Men ===
Athlete	Event	Round of 16	Quarterfinals	Semifinals	Final	
Athlete	Event	Opposition Result	Opposition Result	Opposition Result	Opposition Result	Rank
Polyneikis Kalamaras	Light heavyweight	Assaghir (MAR); W RSC-I - 2:04	Lazar (SLO); W 5–0	Abdelgawwad (EGY); L 1–3	Did not advance	3rd place, bronze medalist(s)
Pavlos Tsagkrakos	Middleweight	Ozkal (TUR); L 2–3	Did not advance			
Alexandros Tsanikidis	Light welterweight	Behrami (KOS); W 5–0	Mohamed (EGY); W 5–0	Nadir (MAR); L 2–3	Did not advance	3rd place, bronze medalist(s)

== Canoeing ==
=== Men ===
Athlete	Event	Heats		Semifinals		Final	
Athlete	Event	Time	Rank	Time	Rank	Time	Rank
Dimitrios Antoniou	K-1 200 m	00:36.811	5 QS	00:36.502	4	Did not advance	
Konstantinos Efthymiadis	K-1 500 m	01:46.856	4 QS	01:43.968	4	Did not advance	
Konstantinos Efthymiadis; Ioannis Koutsopodiotis	K-2 500 m	01:43.481	6 QS	01:38.503	4	Did not advance	

=== Women ===
Athlete	Event	Heats		Semifinals		Final	
Athlete	Event	Time	Rank	Time	Rank	Time	Rank
Markela Nina Kavoura	K-1 200 m	00:46.773	5 QS	00:45.886	4	Did not advance	
Eleftheria Kaminari	K-1 500 m	02:07.215	6 QS	02:04.057	4	Did not advance	

Legend: FA = Qualify to final (medal); FB = Qualify to final B (non-medal)

== Cycling ==
=== Men ===
Athlete	Event	Time	Rank
Georgios Bouglas	Men's road race	DNF	
Stylianos Farantakis	Men's road race	DNF	
Charalampos Kastrantas	Men's road race	DNF	
Ioannis Kyriakidis	Men's road race	DNF	
Polychronis Tzortzakis	Men's road race	DNF	
Charalampos Kastrantas	Men's time trial	33:25.13	13
Polychronis Tzortzakis	Men's time trial	31:46.81	7

=== Women ===
Athlete	Event	Time	Rank
Argyro Milaki	Men's road race	3:04:00	22
Varvara Fasoi	Men's road race	2:52:40	18
Argyro Milaki	Men's time trial	26:36.71	7
Varvara Fasoi	Men's time trial	25:51.61	5

== Equestrian ==
=== Jumping ===
Athlete	Horse	Event	Qualification					Final								Total	
Athlete	Horse	Event	Round 1		Round 2			Round A		Round B			Jump Off			Total	
Athlete	Horse	Event	Penalties	Rank	Penalties	Total	Rank	Penalties	Rank	Penalties	Total	Rank	Penalties	Total	Rank	Penalties	Rank
Alexandros Fourlis	Grandeur	Individual	6	23	24	24	21	Did not advance					—N/a			24	21
Aggelos Touloupis	Idealisca	Individual	D	48	D	D	47	Did not advance					—N/a			999	47
Ioli Mytilineou	Mon Ame II	Individual	19	41	30	30	24	Did not advance					—N/a			30	24
Hannah Mytilineou	Laverin Du Saar	Individual	15	36	A	A	45	Did not advance					—N/a			999	45
Alexandros Fourlis; Avgerinos Linardos; Aggelos Touloupis; Ioli Mytilineou; Hannah Mytilineou	See above	Team	—N/a					20	9	20	40	9	40	40	9	40	9

== Fencing ==
=== Men ===
Athlete	Event	Group stage					Round of 16	Quarterfinal	Semifinal	Final / BM	
Athlete	Event	Opposition Score	Opposition Score	Opposition Score	Opposition Score	Rank	Opposition Score	Opposition Score	Opposition Score	Opposition Score	Rank
Savvas Kavvadias	Individual épée	Ramos (ESP); L 2–5	Canonne (FRA); L 4–5	Candeia (POR); L 3–4	Cuomo (ITA); W 5–4	4 Q	Pizzo (ITA); L 10–15	Did not advance			

=== Women ===
Athlete	Event	Group stage							Round of 16	Quarterfinal	Semifinal	Final / BM	
Athlete	Event	Opposition Score	Opposition Score	Opposition Score	Opposition Score	Opposition Score	Opposition Score	Rank	Opposition Score	Opposition Score	Opposition Score	Opposition Score	Rank
Niki Katerina Sidiropoulou	Individual épée	Rembi (FRA); L 2–5	Foietta (ITA); L 1–5	Gavin (ESP); W 5–2	Mavrikiou (CYP); W 5–2	Sel (SRB); W 5–2	Tannous (LBN); W 5–2	3 Q	Bye	Coquin (FRA); L 12–15	Did not advance		
Despina Georgiadou	Individual sabre	Azza Besbes (TUN); W 5–4	Rifkiss (FRA); W 5–2	Laso (ESP); W 5–1	Shchukla (TUR); W 5–2	Mormile (ITA); W 5–4	—N/a	1 Q	Bye	Gkountoura (GRE); W 15–9	Ciaraglia (ITA); L 9–15	Did not advance	3rd place, bronze medalist(s)
Theodora Gkountoura	Individual sabre	Barbero (ESP); L 1–5	Balzer (FRA); W 5–2	Ciaraglia (ITA); L 3–5	Erbil (TUR); L 0–5	—N/a		5 Q	Shchukla (TUR); W 15–9	Georgiadou (GRE); L 9–15	Did not advance		
Aikaterini-Maria Kontochristopoulou	Individual foil	de Costanzo (ITA); L 0–5	Elsharkawy (EGY); L 4–5	Mienville (FRA); L 2–5	Blanco (ESP); L 1–5	Gunes (TUR); W 5–0	Shaito (LBN); W 5–2	5 Q	Shaito (LBN); W 15–14	Njanga (FRA); L 9–15	Did not advance		

== Football ==
=== Men's tournament ===
Team
- Giorgos Antzoulas
- Apostolos Diamantis
- Dimitrios Emmanouilidis
- Ioannis Galoupis
- Alexandros Gkargkalatzidis
- Fotios Ioannidis
- Theodosios Machairas
- Dimitrios Meliopoulos
- Ioannis Michailidis
- Ioannis Nikopolidis
- Ioannis Sardelis
- Antriano Skenterai
- Marios Tsaousis
- Vasileios Panagiotis Tsimopoulos
- Georgios Vitaliotis
- Alexandros Voilis
Coaches
- (Greece) Ioannis Gkoumas
- (Greece) Spyridon Livathinos
- (Greece) Lampros Spintzos

==== Group C ====
Pos	Team	Pld	W	D	L	GF	GA	GD	Pts	Qualification
1	Greece	2	2	0	0	4	1	+3	6	Semifinals
2	France	2	1	0	1	2	3	−1	3	
3	Turkey	2	0	0	2	0	2	−2	0	

Source: Tarragona 2018
24 June 2018
20:00

Turkey	0–1	Greece
		Emmanouilidis 68'

Estadi Municipal de Calafell, Calafell
Referee: Xavier Estrada Fernández (Spain)

26 June 2018
20:00

France	1–3	Greece
Gassama 75'		Emmanouilidis 48'; Gkargkalatzidis 90+1'; Voilis 90+5'

Estadi Municipal de Reus, Reus
Referee: Marco Di Bello (Italy)

==== Semifinal ====
28 June 2018
17:00

Italy	3–0	Greece
Rauti 17'; Merola 31' (pen.); Caviglia 71'

Estadi Municipal de Reus, Reus

==== Bronze-medal match ====
30 June 2018
10:00

Greece	0–0	Morocco
Penalties
	6–7

Estadi Municipal de Calafell, Calafell

Team	Rank
Greece	Fourth place

== Golf ==
=== Men ===
Athlete	Event	Round 1	Round 2	Round 3	Round 4	Total	
Athlete	Event	Score	Score	Score	Score	Score	Rank
Dimitrios Rokadakis	Individual	8	17	27	29	29	34
Panagiotis Samakovlis	Individual	3	11	21	31	31	35
Vasilios Koumpakis	Individual	6	9	11	13	13	27
Dimitrios Rokadakis; Panagiotis Samakovlis; Vasilios Koumpakis	Team	9	20	32	36	36	12

=== Women ===
Athlete	Event	Round 1	Round 2	Round 3	Round 4	Total	
Athlete	Event	Score	Score	Score	Score	Score	Rank
Alkyoni Aharidi	Individual	6	11	19	27	27	20
Paraskevi Vergou	Individual	12	22	37	44	44	21
Konstantina Kolymbaki	Individual	14	23	30	45	45	22
Alkyoni Aharidi; Paraskevi Vergou; Konstantina Kolymbaki	Team	18	32	47	62	62	7

== Gymnastics ==
=== Artistic ===
==== Men ====
Athlete	Event	Team Final								Individual Final							
Athlete	Event	Apparatus						Total	Rank	Apparatus						Total	Rank
Athlete	Event	F	PH	R	V	PB	HB	Total	Rank	F	PH	R	V	PB	HB	Total	Rank
Georgios Christos Chatziefstathiou	Team	11.550	12.950	12.850	—N/a	12.900	12.850	242.700	6	Did not advance							
Nikolaos Iliopoulos	Team	13.250	12.100	13.200	—N/a	14.100	13.900 Q	242.700	6	11.600	12.900	13.250	13.700	14.000	13.600	79.050	10
Christoforos Konstantinidis	Team	13.950 Q	DNS	13.550	—N/a	—N/a	—N/a	242.700	6	Did not advance							
Vlasios Maras	Team	—N/a	—N/a	—N/a	—N/a	13.300	14.200 Q	242.700	6	Did not advance							
Antonios Tantalidis	Team	13.400	14.000 Q	12.350	—N/a	12.900	12.850	242.700	6	13.200	12.050	12.650	14.400	13.150	11.000	76.450	13

Apparatus

Athlete	Event	Final	
Athlete	Event	Total	Rank
Antonios Tantalidis	Pommel horse	13.933	7
Christoforos Konstantinidis	Floor	13.666	5
Vlasios Maras	Horizontal bar	12.466	8
Nikolaos Iliopoulos	Horizontal bar	13.266	5

==== Women ====
Athlete	Event	Team Final						Individual Final					
Athlete	Event	Apparatus				Total	Rank	Apparatus				Total	Rank
Athlete	Event	V	UB	BB	F	Total	Rank	V	UB	BB	F	Total	Rank
Argyro Afrati	Team	—N/a	11.650	7.500	12.975 Q	141.250	7	Did not advance					
Vasiliki Millousi	Team	12.500 Q	—N/a	12.100	—N/a	141.250	7	Did not advance					
Evangelia Monokrousou	Team	10.000	11.850	—N/a	12.950 Q	141.250	7	Did not advance					
Evangelia Plyta	Team	—N/a	—N/a	10.900	—N/a	141.250	7	Did not advance					
Ioanna Xoulogi	Team	10.800	11.650	11.200	—N/a	141.250	7	12.600	11.950	11.000	12.100	47.650	11

Apparatus

Athlete	Event	Final	
Athlete	Event	Total	Rank
Evangelia Monokrousou	Vault	12.399	7
Argyro Afrati	Vault	13.333	5
Vasiliki Millousi	Balance beam	12.166	5

=== Rhythmic ===
Athlete	Event	Qualification						Final					
Athlete	Event	Hoop	Ball	Clubs	Ribbon	Total	Rank	Hoop	Ball	Clubs	Ribbon	Total	Rank
Maria Dervisi	All-around	12.250	12.200	13.350	10.300	48.100	13	Did not advance					
Eleni Kelaiditi	All-around	16.300	17.550	18.200	15.800	67.850	3 Q	17.100	17.950	18.300	17.400	70.750	2nd place, silver medalist(s)

== Handball ==
=== Men's tournament ===
Team
- Konstantinos Gourgoumis
- Petros Mpoukovinas
- Angelos Tsilis
- Christos Stigkas
- Petros Kyriakou
- Anastasios Papadionysiou
- Panagiotis Karampourniotis
- Stefanos Michailidis
- Christos Kederis
- Charalampos Mallios
- Charalampos Dompris
- Nikolaos Kritikos
- Nikolaos Passias
- Ioannis Kalomoiros
- Efthymios Iliopoulos
- Ioannis Krallis
Coaches
- (Greece) Ioannis Arvanitis
- (Greece) Georgios Chalkidis

==== Group C ====
Pos	Team	Pld	W	D	L	GF	GA	GD	Pts	Qualification
1	Spain (H)	2	2	0	0	80	39	+41	4	Quarterfinals
2	Portugal	2	0	1	1	50	62	−12	1 (Note: Greece 28–28 Portugal)	Quarterfinals
3	Greece	2	0	1	1	45	74	−29	1	

Source: Tarragona 2018
Rules for classification: 1) Points; 2) Head-to-head points; 3) Head-to-head goal difference; 4) Head-to-head goals scored; 5) Goal difference; 6) Goals scored; 7) Draw.
(H) Hosts
Notes:

23 June 2018; 14:00	Spain	46–17	Greece	Campclar Sports Palace, Campolara; Referees: ,
23 June 2018; 14:00		(–)		Campclar Sports Palace, Campolara; Referees: ,

25 June 2018; 14:00	Greece	28–28	Portugal	Campclar Sports Palace, Campolara; Referees: ,
25 June 2018; 14:00		(–)		Campclar Sports Palace, Campolara; Referees: ,

=== Women's tournament ===
Team
- Fragkoula Papanikolaou
- Elisavet Mastaka
- Magdalini Kepesidou
- Agni Zygoura
- Lamprini Tsakalou
- Niki Ratsika
- Eleni Mournou
- Christa Maria Stougiannidou
- Angeliki Karela
- Olympia Andritsou
- Aikaterini Mania
- Aikaterini Vafeiadou
- Panagiota Argyropoulou
- Rafailia Karacharisi
- Vasiliki Gkatsiou
Coaches
- (Greece) Georgios Vasiliadis
- (Greece) Menelaos Danilos

==== Group A ====
Pos	Team	Pld	W	D	L	GF	GA	GD	Pts	Qualification
1	Spain (H)	4	4	0	0	116	65	+51	8	Semifinals
2	Slovenia	4	3	0	1	108	100	+8	6	Semifinals
3	Italy	4	1	0	3	103	118	−15	2 (Note: Italy 2 Pts, +2 GD; Portugal 2 Pts, 0 GD; Greece 2 Pts, –2 GD)	5th place game
4	Portugal	4	1	0	3	95	117	−22	2	7th place game
5	Greece	4	1	0	3	90	112	−22	2	

Source: Tarragona 2018
Rules for classification: 1) Points; 2) Head-to-head points; 3) Head-to-head goal difference; 4) Head-to-head goals scored; 5) Goal difference; 6) Goals scored; 7) Draw.
(H) Hosts
Notes:

23 June 2018; 14:00	Greece	26–31	Italy	Campclar Sports Palace, Campolara; Referees: ,
23 June 2018; 14:00		(–)		Campclar Sports Palace, Campolara; Referees: ,

24 June 2018; 14:00	Spain	27–12	Greece	Campclar Sports Palace, Campolara; Referees: ,
24 June 2018; 14:00		(–)		Campclar Sports Palace, Campolara; Referees: ,

27 June 2018; 14:00	Greece	28–25	Portugal	Campclar Sports Palace, Campolara; Referees: ,
27 June 2018; 14:00		(–)		Campclar Sports Palace, Campolara; Referees: ,

28 June 2018; 14:00	Slovenia	29–24	Greece	Campclar Sports Palace, Campolara; Referees: ,
28 June 2018; 14:00		(–)		Campclar Sports Palace, Campolara; Referees: ,

== Judo ==
=== Men ===
Athlete	Event	Round of 16	Quarterfinals	Semifinals	Repechage 1	Repechage 2	Final / BM	
Athlete	Event	Opposition Result	Opposition Result	Opposition Result	Opposition Result	Opposition Result	Opposition Result	Rank
Alexios Ntanatsidis	−81 kg	Michael (CYP); W 100–000	Egutidze (POR); W 100–000	Ahmed Abdelaal (EGY); L 000–100	Bye		Kasem (SYR); W 000–000	3rd place, bronze medalist(s)
Theodoros Tselidis	−90 kg	Grinda (MON); W 110–000	Martinho (POR); W 100–000	Majdov (SRB); L 000–010	Bye		Snoussi (TUN); W 110–000	3rd place, bronze medalist(s)
Dimitrios Tsoumitas	+100 kg	Abdallaoui (MAR); W 100–000	Sadikovic (BIH); L 000–100	Did not advance	Bye	Dragič (SLO); L 010–100	Did not advance	
Georgios Malliaropoulos	-100 kg	Sajher Kovacic (SLO); W 100–000	Darwish (EGY); L 000–100	Did not advance	Bye	Ben Khaled (TUN); L 000–010	Did not advance	
Eleftherios Marics Panagiotou	-66 kg	Lombardo (ITA); L 000–110	Did not advance		Jereb (SLO); L 000–100	Did not advance		

=== Women ===
Athlete	Event	Round of 16	Quarterfinals	Semifinals	Repechage 1	Repechage 2	Final / BM	
Athlete	Event	Opposition Result	Opposition Result	Opposition Result	Opposition Result	Opposition Result	Opposition Result	Rank
Aikaterini Theodorakopoulou	−48 kg	Chakir (MAR); L 000–100	Did not advance					

== Karate ==
=== Men ===
Athlete	Event	Round of 16	Quarterfinals	Semifinals	Repechage	Final / BM	
Athlete	Event	Opposition Result	Opposition Result	Opposition Result	Opposition Result	Opposition Result	Rank
Nikolaos Gidakos	−67 kg	Kallah (EGY); L 0–8	Did not advance				
Michail Georgios Tzanos	−84 kg	Martina (ITA); L 0–0	Did not advance				

=== Women ===
Athlete	Event	Round of 16	Quarterfinals	Semifinals	Repechage	Final / BM	
Athlete	Event	Opposition Result	Opposition Result	Opposition Result	Opposition Result	Opposition Result	Rank
Christina Irini Kavakopoulou	−50 kg	Bourcoisi (FRA); W 2–0	Perfetto (ITA); W 3–0	Milivojčević (SRB); L 0–0	—N/a	Rashed (EGY); L 0–1	4
Eleni Chatziliadou	+68 kg	Fortesa (KOS); W 5–0	Celan (CRO); W 3–1	Hocaoglu (TUR); W 3–2	—N/a	Garcia (FRA); L 3–4	2nd place, silver medalist(s)

== Rowing ==
=== Men ===
Athlete	Event	Heats		Repechage		Semifinal		Final	
Athlete	Event	Time	Rank	Time	Rank	Time	Rank	Time	Rank
Spyridon Giannaros	Lightweight single sculls	3:23.585	2 QSF	Bye		3:22.857	5 Q	3:24.415	3rd place, bronze medalist(s)
Spyridon Kalentzis	Single sculls	3:21.729	2 QFA	Bye		—N/a		3:22.843	3rd place, bronze medalist(s)
Ioannis Marokos; Ninos Nikolaidis	Lightweight double sculls	2:57.298	2 QFA	Bye		—N/a		3:04.342	2nd place, silver medalist(s)
Stefanos Douskos; Christos Steryiakas	Double sculls	2:58.978	2 QFA	Bye		—N/a		2:58.983	1st place, gold medalist(s)

=== Women ===
Athlete	Event	Heats		Repechage		Final	
Athlete	Event	Time	Rank	Time	Rank	Time	Rank
Thomais Emmanouilidou	Lightweight single sculls	3:40.282	2 QFA	Bye		3:52.490	2nd place, silver medalist(s)
Aikaterini Nikolaidou	Single sculls	3:32.731	1 QFA	Bye		3:43.763	1st place, gold medalist(s)

== Sailing ==
=== Men ===
Athlete	Event	Race											Net points	Final rank
Athlete	Event	1	2	3	4	5	6	7	8	9	10	M*	Net points	Final rank
Byron Kokkalanis	RS:X	2	~~7~~	5	3	3	2	4	5	3	6	4	37	4
Georgios Fragos	RS:X	8	~~10~~	9	9	9	9	9	9	9	10	9	90	9
Antonios Bougiouris	Laser	7	3	7	12	14	13	9	7	7	10	~~17~~	89	9
Dimitrios Papadimitriou	Laser	11	6	10	14	9	11	~~21~~	21	6	15	15	118	14

=== Women ===
Athlete	Event	Race											Net points	Final rank
Athlete	Event	1	2	3	4	5	6	7	8	9	10	M*	Net points	Final rank
Aikaterini Divari	RS:X	9	9	9	~~11~~	10	9	9	9	9	9	9	91	9
Angeliki Skarlatou	RS:X	8	8	8	~~9~~	7	6	8	7	7	6	8	73	8
Maria Vlachou	Laser Radial	11	11	12	10	12	10	12	12	9	~~14~~	11	109	11
Athanasia Fakidi	Laser Radial	~~7~~	3	1	6	1	1	3	1	7	4	3	30	1st place, gold medalist(s)

== Shooting ==
=== Men ===
Athlete	Event	Qualification		Final	
Athlete	Event	Points	Rank	Points	Rank
Ioannis Chatzitsakiroglou	Trap	115	21	Did not advance	
Anargyros Tzinakos	Trap	103	25	Did not advance	
Georgios Gampierakis	10 m air pistol	567	12	Did not advance	
Georgios Mastrodimitropoulos	10 m air pistol	563	13	Did not advance	
Theodoros Karpidas	10 m air rifle	603.7	16	Did not advance	
Evangelos Zisis	10 m air rifle	609.7	12	Did not advance	

=== Women ===
Athlete	Event	Qualification		Final	
Athlete	Event	Points	Rank	Points	Rank
Anna Korakaki	10 m air pistol	575	1 QF	240.2	1st place, gold medalist(s)
Dimitra Papakanellou	10 m air pistol	561	6 QF	109.9	8
Marousa Makraki	10 m air rifle	616.6	14	Did not advance	
Maria Tsionoglou	10 m air rifle	608.1	20	Did not advance	

== Swimming ==
=== Swimming ===
==== Men ====
Athlete	Event	Heat		Final	
Athlete	Event	Time	Rank	Time	Rank
Romanos Iasonas Alyfantis	50 m breaststroke	28.53	9	Did not advance	
Romanos Iasonas Alyfantis	100 m breaststroke	1:02.01	5 q	1:02.52	8
Romanos Iasonas Alyfantis	200 m breaststroke	2:18.22	10	Did not advance	
Apostolos Christou	50 m backstroke	25.43	2 q	25.35	3rd place, bronze medalist(s)
Apostolos Christou	100 m backstroke	56.64	6 q	54.68	1st place, gold medalist(s)
Apostolos Christou	200 m backstroke	2:03.74	8 q	2:00.37	3rd place, bronze medalist(s)
Stefanos Dimitriadis	100 m butterfly	53.67	3 q	53.18	4
Stefanos Dimitriadis	200 m butterfly	2:00.02	5 q	1:58.16	3rd place, bronze medalist(s)
Dimitrios Dimitriou	200 m freestyle	1:50.91	11	Did not advance	
Dimitrios Dimitriou	400 m freestyle	3:53.64	6 q	3:55.27	8
Kristian Golomeev	50 m freestyle	22.37	3 q	21.66	1st place, gold medalist(s)
Kristian Golomeev	50 m butterfly	24.00	2 q	23.53	1st place, gold medalist(s)
Ioannis Karpouzlis	50 m breaststroke	28.11	7 q	27.65	5
Ioannis Karpouzlis	100 m breaststroke	1:02.08	8 q	1:02.28	6
Ioannis Karpouzlis	200 m breaststroke	2:17.24	8 q	2:17.72	8
Fotios Koliopoulos	50 m freestyle	23.49	15	Did not advance	
Fotios Koliopoulos	100 m freestyle	51.26	12	Did not advance	
Fotios Koliopoulos	100 m butterfly	55.07	11	Did not advance	
Dimitrios Negris	200 m freestyle	1:50.89	10	Did not advance	
Dimitrios Negris	400 m freestyle	3:56.42	10	Did not advance	
Dimitrios Negris	1500 m freestyle	—N/a		15:13.13	4
Nikolaos Sofianidis	50 m backstroke	25.90	5 q	25.71	5
Nikolaos Sofianidis	100 m backstroke	56.80	7 q	55.23	4
Nikolaos Sofianidis	200 m backstroke	2:02.15	5 q	2:01.66	5
Georgios Spanoudakis	200 m individual medley	2:03.08	6 q	2:01.85	5
Georgios Spanoudakis	100 m freestyle	51.31	13	Did not advance	
Andreas Vazaios	200 m individual medley	2:00.84	1 q	1:59.40	1st place, gold medalist(s)
Andreas Vazaios	50 m butterfly	24.76	10	Did not advance	
Andreas Vazaios	200 m butterfly	2:00.04	6 q	1:58.16	3rd place, bronze medalist(s)
Apostolos Christou; Kristian Golomeev; Fotios Koliopoulos; Andreas Vazaios	4 × 100 m freestyle relay	—N/a		3:36.64	1st place, gold medalist(s)
Apostolos Christou; Dimitrios Dimitriou; Dimitrios Negris; Andreas Vazaios	4 × 200 m freestyle relay	—N/a		7:24.38	4
Apostolos Christou; Kristian Golomeev; Ioannis Karpouzlis; Andreas Vazaios	4 × 100 m medley relay	—N/a		3:18.25	2nd place, silver medalist(s)

==== Women ====
Athlete	Event	Heat		Final	
Athlete	Event	Time	Rank	Time	Rank
Kalliopi Araouzou	400 m freestyle	4:18.81	8	4:22.11	8
Kalliopi Araouzou	800 m freestyle	—N/a		8:50.51	9
Vasiliki Stavroula Baka	100 m freestyle	57.03	11	Did not advance	
Vasiliki Stavroula Baka	200 m freestyle	2:02.89	6 q	2:04.36	8
Theodora Drakou	50 m freestyle	25.57	3 q	25.31	3rd place, bronze medalist(s)
Theodora Drakou	50 m backstroke	28.67	1 q	28.61	3rd place, bronze medalist(s)
Theodora Drakou	100 m backstroke	1:02.69	6 q	1:02.53	5
Maria Thalia Drasidou	50 m breaststroke	31.86	3 q	31.69	4
Maria Thalia Drasidou	100 m breaststroke	1:11.93	11	Did not advance	
Afroditi Katsiara	200 m freestyle	2:07.44	14	Did not advance	
Afroditi Katsiara	400 m freestyle	4:24.70	13	Did not advance	
Afroditi Katsiara	800 m freestyle	—N/a		09:03.11	4
Sofia Klikopoulou	50 m freestyle	25.82	7 q	25.77	6
Sofia Klikopoulou	100 m freestyle	56.57	8 q	56.27	7
Ilektra Varvara Lebl	200 m individual medley	2:17.41	8 q	2:17.71	8
Ilektra Varvara Lebl	400 m individual medley	4:50.07	7 q	4:49.75	8
Ilektra Varvara Lebl	200 m butterfly	2:18.37	10	Did not advance	
Anna Ntountounaki	50 m butterfly	26.30	3 q	26.57	4
Anna Ntountounaki	100 m butterfly	59.94	4 q	58.78	3rd place, bronze medalist(s)
Anna Ntountounaki	200 m butterfly	2:14.10	8 q	2:14.54	8
Kristel Vourna	50 m butterfly	27.09	7 q	26.84	5
Kristel Vourna	100 m butterfly	59.62	3 q	59.48	5
Vasiliki Stavroula Baka; Theodora Drakou; Maria Thalia Drasidou; Sofia Klikopoulou	4 × 100 m freestyle relay	—N/a		3:44.70	4
Vasiliki Stavroula Baka; Afroditi Katsiara; Ilektra Varvara Lebl; Sofia Klikopoulou	4 × 200 m freestyle relay	—N/a		8:23.34	7
Vasiliki Stavroula Baka; Theodora Drakou; Maria Thalia Drasidou; Anna Ntountounaki	4 × 100 m medley relay	—N/a		4:08.22	3rd place, bronze medalist(s)

=== Paralympic Swimming ===
==== Men ====
Athlete	Event	Heat		Final	
Athlete	Event	Time	Rank	Time	Rank
Dimosthenis Michalentzakis	100 m freestyle S10	1:00.70	10	Did not advance	

== Table tennis ==
=== Men ===
Athlete	Event	Round Robin 1				Round Robin 2				Quarterfinal	Semifinal	Final / BM	
Athlete	Event	Opposition Score	Opposition Score	Opposition Score	Rank	Opposition Score	Opposition Score	Opposition Score	Rank	Opposition Score	Opposition Score	Opposition Score	Rank
Konstantinos Panagiotis Konstantinopoulos	Singles	Gunduz (TUR); L 0–4	Karabaxhak (KOS); W 4–WO	Juncal (ESP); L 1–4	3	Did not advance							
Ioannis Sgouropoulos	Singles	Jorgic (SLO); L 0–4	Hmam (TUN); W 4–1	—N/a	2 Q	Kozul (SLO); W 4–3	Chen (POR); W 4–1	Bobocica (ITA); L 1–4	3	Did not advance			
Konstantinos Panagiotis Konstantinopoulos; Ioannis Sgouropoulos	Team	Slovenia (SLO); L 0–3	Portugal (POR); L 1–3	—N/a	3	—N/a				Did not advance			

=== Women ===
Athlete	Event	Round Robin 1				Round Robin 2				Quarterfinal	Semifinal	Final / BM	
Athlete	Event	Opposition Score	Opposition Score	Opposition Score	Rank	Opposition Score	Opposition Score	Opposition Score	Rank	Opposition Score	Opposition Score	Opposition Score	Rank
Aikaterini Toliou	Singles	Dvorak (ESP); L 2–4	Markovic (BIH); W 4–1	—N/a	2 Q	Galic (SLO); W 4–2	Oliveira (POR); W 4–WO	Piccolin (ITA); L 3–4	2 Q	Dvorak (ESP); L 3–4	Did not advance		
Georgia Zavitsanou	Singles	Loeuillette (FRA); L 0–4	Garci (TUN); W 4–1	Colantoni (ITA); L 1–4	3	Did not advance							
Aikaterini Toliou; Georgia Zavitsanou	Team	Spain (ESP); L 0–3	Algeria (ALG); W 3–1	—N/a	2 Q	—N/a				Egypt (EGY); W 3–2	Turkey (TUR); L 1–3	France (FRA); L 0–3	4

== Taekwondo ==
=== Men ===
Athlete	Event	Round of 16	Quarterfinals	Semifinals	Final / BM	
Athlete	Event	Opposition Result	Opposition Result	Opposition Result	Opposition Result	Rank
Konstantinos Chamalidis	−68 kg	Cani (ALB); W 24–16	Pantar (SLO); W 19–7	Recber (TUR); W 12–9	Perez Polo (ESP); L 3–17	2nd place, silver medalist(s)
Eleftherios Fakinos	−58 kg	Gjana (ALB); W 24–3	Neffati (TUN); L 6–14	Did not advance		
Athanasios Nikolaidis	+80 kg	Bassel (MAR); L 13–16	Did not advance			
Apostolos Telikostoglou	−80 kg	Bouzid Souihli (FRA); L 15–21	Did not advance			

=== Women ===
Athlete	Event	Round of 16	Quarterfinals	Semifinals	Final / BM	
Athlete	Event	Opposition Result	Opposition Result	Opposition Result	Opposition Result	Rank
Varvara Apoikou	−49 kg	Palmer Soler (ESP); L 7–25	Did not advance			
Athanasia Mitsopoulou	−67 kg	Bye	Lemajic (SLO); L 4–19	Did not advance		
Evgenia Sarri	+67 kg	Azzeddine (ALG); L 19–31	Did not advance			
Konstantina Tzeli	−57 kg	Ben Ali (TUN); W 3–1	Calvo Gomez (ESP); L 6–14	Did not advance		

== Tennis ==
=== Men ===
Athlete	Event	Round of 32	Round of 16	Quarterfinals	Semifinals	Final / BM	
Athlete	Event	Opposition Score	Opposition Score	Opposition Score	Opposition Score	Opposition Score	Rank
Ioannis Stergiou	Singles	Gautier (AND); W 2–0	Efstathiou (CYP); L 0–2	Did not advance			

=== Women ===
Athlete	Event	Round of 32	Round of 16	Quarterfinals	Semifinals	Final / BM	
Athlete	Event	Opposition Score	Opposition Score	Opposition Score	Opposition Score	Opposition Score	Rank
Emmanouela Antonaki	Singles	Erjavec (SLO); L 0–2	Did not advance				
Anna Arkadianou	Singles	Benaissa (ALG); W 2–0	Tan (FRA); L 0–2	Did not advance			
Emmanouela Antonaki; Anna Arkadianou	Doubles	—N/a	Bye	France (FRA); L 1–2	Did not advance		

== Volleyball ==
=== Men's tournament ===
Team
- Nikos Zoupani
- Panagiotis Papadopoulos
- Dmytro Filippov
- Konstantinos Stivachtis
- Georgios Petreas
- Dimitrios Zisis
- Ioannis Roumeliotakis
- Ioannis Takouridis
- Panagiotis Pelekoudas
- Theologos Christos Daridis
- Iraklis Papadopoulos
- Anestis Dalakouras
Coaches
- (Greece) Dimitrios Andreopoulos
- (Greece) Pavlos Karamaroudis

==== Group A ====
Pos	Team	Pld	W	L	Pts	SW	SL	SR	SPW	SPL	SPR	Qualification
1	Italy	2	2	0	6	6	0	MAX	150	109	1.376	Quarterfinals
2	Greece	2	1	1	3	3	3	1.000	137	133	1.030	Quarterfinals
3	Portugal	2	0	2	0	0	6	0.000	105	150	0.700	

Date	Time		Score		Set 1	Set 2	Set 3	Set 4	Set 5	Total	Report
23 Jun	13:00	Italy	3–0	Greece	25–20	25–19	25–23			75–62	
24 Jun	16:00	Greece	3–0	Portugal	25–20	25–18	25–20			75–58	

==== Quarterfinal ====
Date	Time		Score		Set 1	Set 2	Set 3	Set 4	Set 5	Total	Report
27 Jun	13:00	France	0–3	Greece	24–26	18–25	15–25			57–76	

==== Semifinal ====
Date	Time		Score		Set 1	Set 2	Set 3	Set 4	Set 5	Total	Report
29 Jun		Greece	0–3	Spain	23–25	15–25	16–25			54–75	

==== Bronze-medal match ====
Date	Time		Score		Set 1	Set 2	Set 3	Set 4	Set 5	Total	Report
30 Jun	19:00	Egypt	2–3	Greece	23–25	22–25	25–19	25–18	10–15	105–102	

Team	Rank
Greece	(bronze) Third place

=== Women's tournament ===
Team
- Lamprini Konstantinidou
- Styliani Christodoulou
- Anthi Vasilantonaki
- Panagiota Dioti
- Evangelia Merteki
- Olga Strantzali
- Athanasia Totsidou
- Maria Genitsaridi
- Georgia Lamprousi
- Aikaterina Giota
- Eirini Chatziefstratiadou
- Maria Eleni Artakianou
Coache
- (Spain) Guillermo Naranjo Hernandez

==== Group A ====
Pos	Team	Pld	W	L	Pts	SW	SL	SR	SPW	SPL	SPR	Qualification
1	Greece	2	2	0	5	6	2	3.000	184	149	1.235	Quarterfinals
2	Italy	2	1	1	4	5	3	1.667	178	158	1.127	Quarterfinals
3	Cyprus	2	0	2	0	0	6	0.000	95	150	0.633	

Date	Time		Score		Set 1	Set 2	Set 3	Set 4	Set 5	Total	Report
22 Jun	12:30	Italy	2–3	Greece	25–23	23–25	21–25	25–21	9–15	103–109	
23 Jun	19:00	Cyprus	0–3	Greece	14–25	20–25	12–25			46–75	

==== Quarterfinal ====
Date	Time		Score		Set 1	Set 2	Set 3	Set 4	Set 5	Total	Report
28 Jun	10:00	Greece	3–1	Spain	26–24	18–25	25–23	28–26		97–98	

==== Semifinal ====
Date	Time		Score		Set 1	Set 2	Set 3	Set 4	Set 5	Total	Report
29 Jun	16:00	Greece	3–2	France	15–25	25–16	19–25	25–20	15–13	99–99	

==== Gold-medal match ====
Date	Time		Score		Set 1	Set 2	Set 3	Set 4	Set 5	Total	Report
Jun		Greece	1–3	Croatia	16–25	13–25	25–17	14-25		68–67	

Team	Rank
Greece	(silver) Second place

== Water polo ==
=== Men's tournament ===
Team
- Dimitrios Nikolaidis
- Alexandros Gounas
- Angelos Vlachopoulos
- Christodoulos Kolomvos
- Georgios Dervisis
- Konstantinos Flegkas
- Marios Kapotsis
- Konstantinos Genidounias
- Evangelos Delakas
- Ioannis Fountoulis
- Stylianos Argyropoulos
- Dimitrios Skoumpakis
- Emmanouil Zerdevas
Coaches
- (Greece) Thodoris Vlachos
- (Greece) Dimitris Kravaritis

==== Preliminary round ====
Team	GP	W	D	L	GF	GA	GD	Pts	Qualification
Greece	3	2	0	1	35	16	19	7	Gold-medal match
Spain	3	2	0	1	30	15	15	6	Bronze-medal match
Italy	3	2	0	1	40	20	20	5	
Turkey	3	0	0	3	10	64	-54	0	

June 27, 2018	Greece	10–11	Italy	Camplara

June 28, 2018	Greece	4–3	Spain	Camplara

June 29, 2018	Greece	21–2	Turkey	Camplara

==== Gold-medal match ====
July 01, 2018; 12:10	Greece	8–8; PSO: 2–4	Serbia	Camplara
July 01, 2018; 12:10	Score by quarters: 1-1, 2-0, 2-4, 3-3			Camplara

Team	Rank
Greece	(silver) Second place

=== Women's tournament ===
Team
- Chrysoula Diamantopoulou
- Christina Tsoukala
- Vasiliki Diamantopoulou
- Nikoleta Eleftheriadou
- Margarita Plevritou
- Alkisti Avramidou
- Alexandra Asimaki
- Maria Patra
- Ioanna Chydirioti
- Elisavet Protopapas
- Eleftheria Plevritou
- Eleni Xenaki
- Ioanna Stamatopoulou
Coaches
- (Greece) Giorgos Morfesis
- (Greece) Angeliki Gerolymou

==== Preliminary round ====
Team	GP	W	D	L	GF	GA	GD	Pts	Qualification
Spain	2	2	0	0	36	14	22	4	Gold-medal match
Greece	2	1	0	1	37	9	28	2	Bronze-medal match
Portugal	2	0	0	2	6	56	-50	0	

June 27, 2018	Spain	9–8	Greece	Camplara

June 29, 2018	Greece	29–0	Portugal	Camplara

==== Bronze-medal match ====
June 30, 2018; 17:20	Greece	15–5	France	Camplara

Team	Rank
Greece	(bronze) Third place

== Water skiing ==
=== Men ===
Athlete	Event	Round 1	Round 2		Final	
Athlete	Event	Points/Time	Points/Time	Rank	Points/Time	Rank
Pavlos Serpieris	Slalom	3.00/55/18.25	4.50/40	12	Did not advance	
Aris Evgenios Techoueyres	Slalom	4.00/55/13.00	DNS	4 Q	2.00/55/12.00	4

=== Women ===
Athlete	Event	Round 1	Round 2		Final	
Athlete	Event	Points/Time	Points/Time	Rank	Points/Time	Rank
Angeliki Andriopoulou	Slalom	2.50/55/14.25	DNS	1 Q	5.00/52/16.00	4
Marie Vympranietsova	Slalom	5.00/52	2.00/52/14.25	2 Q	1.00/52	9

== Weightlifting ==
=== Men ===
Athlete	Event	Snatch		Clean & jerk	
Athlete	Event	Result	Rank	Result	Rank
Dimitrios Aslanidis	−85 kg	152	2nd place, silver medalist(s)	183	3rd place, bronze medalist(s)
Theodoros Iakovidis	−94 kg	161	2nd place, silver medalist(s)	195	1st place, gold medalist(s)
Georgios Markoulas	−105 kg	158	4	201	4
Konstantinos Rempelis	−77 kg	125	5	155	5

=== Women ===
Athlete	Event	Snatch		Clean & jerk	
Athlete	Event	Result	Rank	Result	Rank
Konstantina Benteli	−58 kg	91	1st place, gold medalist(s)	107	2nd place, silver medalist(s)
Eleni Kourtelidou	−69 kg	88	4	107	5
Irini Bourelia	−75 kg	73	8	100	8
Maria Pipiliaridou	−48 kg	66	7	80	6

== Wrestling ==
=== Men's freestyle ===
Athlete	Event	Round of 16	Quarterfinal	Semifinal	Repechage 1	Repechage 2	Final / BM	
Athlete	Event	Opposition Result	Opposition Result	Opposition Result	Opposition Result	Opposition Result	Opposition Result	Rank
Kyrillos Binenmpaoum	−74 kg	Bye	Marquez (ITA); L 0–0	Did not advance	Galea (MLT); L 0–0	Did not advance		
Timofei Xenidis	−97 kg	Dede (TUR); L 6–7	Did not advance					

=== Men's Greco-Roman ===
Athlete	Event	Round of 16	Quarterfinal	Semifinal	Repechage	Final / BM	
Athlete	Event	Opposition Result	Opposition Result	Opposition Result	Opposition Result	Opposition Result	Rank
Laokratis Kesidis	−97 kg	Bye	Kajala (SRB); L 1–9	Did not advance			
Apostolos Manouilidis	−67 kg	Bye	Elsayed (EGY); L 0–9	Did not advance	Alhasan (SYR); L 4–12	Did not advance	
Georgios Prevolarakis	−77 kg	Bye	Stefanek (SRB); L 0–0	Did not advance	Margaryan (FRA); L 0–0	Did not advance	
Dimitrios Tsekeridis	−87 kg	Bye	Sidazara (ALG); L 2–3	Did not advance	Huklek (CRO); W 12–1	Did not advance	3rd place, bronze medalist(s)

=== Women's freestyle ===
Athlete	Event	Round Robin				Rank
Athlete	Event	Opposition Result	Opposition Result	Opposition Result	Opposition Result	Rank
Christina Demirkan	−57 kg	Aouissi (ALG); L 4–9	Gun (TUR); L 0–4	Diaz (ESP); L 2–6	Rainero (ITA); L 0–9	5
Maria Prevolaraki	−53 kg	Erge (TUR); W 7–2	Mori (ITA); W 11–0	Flores (ESP); W 10–0	Honorine (FRA); W 6–0	1st place, gold medalist(s)
Theodora Telianidou	−62 kg	Amri (TUN); L 0–4	Da Col (ITA); L 0–4	—N/a		5
