= Swimming at the 2018 Mediterranean Games – Men's 100 metre butterfly =

Men's 100 metre butterfly at the 2018 Mediterranean Games
- Venue: Campclar Aquatic Center
- Location: Tarragona, Spain
- Dates: 23 June
- Competitors: 14 from 9 nations
- Winning time: 52.25

Medalists
gold medal	Piero Codia	Italy
silver medal	Matteo Rivolta	Italy
bronze medal	Ümit Can Güreş	Turkey

The men's 100 metre butterfly competition at the 2018 Mediterranean Games was held on 23 June 2018 at the Campclar Aquatic Center.

== Records ==
Prior to this competition, the existing world and Mediterranean Games records were as follows:

World record	Michael Phelps (USA)	49.82	Rome, Italy	1 August 2009
Mediterranean Games record	Ivan Lenđer (SRB)	51.79	Pescara, Italy	28 June 2009

== Results ==
=== Heats ===
The heats were held at 10:03.

Rank	Heat	Lane	Name	Nationality	Time	Notes
1	1	5	Ümit Can Güreş	Turkey	52.85	Q
2	2	4	Piero Codia	Italy	53.08	Q
3	2	3	Stefanos Dimitriadis	Greece	53.67	Q
4	1	6	Alberto Lozano	Spain	53.70	Q
5	1	4	Matteo Rivolta	Italy	53.78	Q
6	2	5	Ivan Lenđer	Serbia	53.94	Q
7	2	6	Jordan Coelho	France	54.16	Q
8	2	2	Berk Özkul	Turkey	54.19	Q
9	1	2	Luis García	Spain	54.21	
10	1	7	Ahmed Hussein	Egypt	54.83	
11	1	3	Fotios Koliopoulos	Greece	55.07	
12	2	7	Gal Kordež	Slovenia	55.88	
13	2	1	Mohamed Abdelbaky	Egypt	56.70	
14	1	1	Dion Kadriu	Kosovo	1:03.89	

=== Final ===
The final was held at 18:06.

Rank	Lane	Name	Nationality	Time	Notes
1st place, gold medalist(s)	5	Piero Codia	Italy	52.25	
2nd place, silver medalist(s)	2	Matteo Rivolta	Italy	52.34	
3rd place, bronze medalist(s)	4	Ümit Can Güreş	Turkey	52.53	
4	3	Stefanos Dimitriadis	Greece	53.18	
5	1	Jordan Coelho	France	53.71	
6	6	Alberto Lozano	Spain	53.75	
7	7	Ivan Lenđer	Serbia	53.83	
8	8	Berk Özkul	Turkey	54.08	
