= Boxing at the 2018 Mediterranean Games – Men's light heavyweight =

Boxing competitions

Men's light heavyweight boxing at the 2018 Mediterranean Games
- Venue: Torredembarra Pavilion
- Date: 26–30 June 2018
- Competitors: 12 from 12 nations

Medalists
gold medal	Abdelrahman Abdelgawad	Egypt
silver medal	Bayram Malkan	Turkey
bronze medal	Polyneikis Kalamaras	Greece
bronze medal	Mohammed Houmri	Algeria

The men's Light heavyweight competition of the boxing events at the 2018 Mediterranean Games in Tarragona, Spain, was held between June 26 and 30 at the Torredembarra Pavilion.

Like all Mediterranean Games boxing events, the competition was a straight single-elimination tournament. Both semifinal losers were awarded bronze medals, so no boxers competed again after their first loss.

== Schedule ==
All times are Central European Summer Time (UTC+2).

Date	Time	Round
June 26, 2018	17:15	Round of 16
June 28, 2018	19:30	Quarterfinals
June 29, 2018	20:00	Semifinals
June 30, 2018	17:30	Final

== Results ==
=== Bracket ===
Round of 16
Bayram Malkan (TUR)	5
Bekim Vjerdha (ALB)	0
Mohammed Houmri (ALG)	4
Alejandro Camacho Fernández (ESP)	1
Mamadou Diabira (FRA)	1
Džemal Bošnjak (BIH)	4
Polyneikis Kalamaras (GRE)	RSC
Mohamed Assaghir (MAR)

Quarterfinals
Valentino Manfredonia (ITA)	0
Bayram Malkan (TUR)	5
Mohammed Houmri (ALG)	5
Leo Cvetković (CRO)	0
Abdelrahman Abdelgawad (EGY)	4
Džemal Bošnjak (BIH)	1
Polyneikis Kalamaras (GRE)	5
Denis Lazar (SLO)	0

Semifinals
Bayram Malkan (TUR)	4
Mohammed Houmri (ALG)	1
Abdelrahman Abdelgawad (EGY)	3
Polyneikis Kalamaras (GRE)	1

Finals
Bayram Malkan (TUR)	2
Abdelrahman Abdelgawad (EGY)	3
