= Swimming at the 2018 Mediterranean Games – Men's 200 metre backstroke =

Men's 200 metre backstroke at the 2018 Mediterranean Games
- Venue: Campclar Aquatic Center
- Location: Tarragona, Spain
- Dates: 25 June
- Competitors: 18 from 12 nations
- Winning time: 1:58.79

Medalists
gold medal	Christopher Ciccarese	Italy
silver medal	Hugo González	Spain
bronze medal	Apostolos Christou	Greece

The men's 200 metre backstroke competition at the 2018 Mediterranean Games was held on 25 June 2018 at the Campclar Aquatic Center.

== Records ==
Prior to this competition, the existing world and Mediterranean Games records were as follows:

World record	Aaron Peirsol (USA)	1:51.92	Rome, Italy	31 July 2009
Mediterranean Games record	Aschwin Wildeboer (ESP)	1:54.96	Pescara, Italy	27 June 2009

== Results ==
=== Heats ===
The heats were held at 09:57.

Rank	Heat	Lane	Name	Nationality	Time	Notes
1	2	5	Hugo González	Spain	2:00.42	Q
2	1	5	Anton Lončar	Croatia	2:00.98	Q
3	3	5	Christopher Ciccarese	Italy	2:01.28	Q
4	2	4	Geoffroy Mathieu	France	2:01.52	Q
5	2	3	Nikolaos Sofianidis	Greece	2:02.15	Q
6	3	6	Jan Giralt	Spain	2:02.80	Q
7	3	4	Matteo Restivo	Italy	2:03.13	Q
8	1	4	Apostolos Christou	Greece	2:03.74	Q
9	2	6	Anže Ferš Eržen	Slovenia	2:04.60	
10	2	2	Berk Özkul	Turkey	2:05.09	
11	2	7	Youssef Said	Egypt	2:05.61	
12	1	7	Driss Lahrichi	Morocco	2:05.96	
13	3	3	Francisco Santos	Portugal	2:05.97	
14	1	6	Ege Başer	Turkey	2:06.12	
15	1	3	João Vital	Portugal	2:06.25	
16	3	2	Ryad Bouhamidi	Algeria	2:07.98	
17	1	2	Sebastian Konnaris	Cyprus	2:10.60	
18	3	7	Omar Eltonbary	Egypt	2:11.17	

=== Final ===
The final was held at 18:12.

Rank	Lane	Name	Nationality	Time	Notes
1st place, gold medalist(s)	3	Christopher Ciccarese	Italy	1:58.79	
2nd place, silver medalist(s)	4	Hugo González	Spain	1:58.94	
3rd place, bronze medalist(s)	8	Apostolos Christou	Greece	2:00.37	
4	5	Anton Lončar	Croatia	2:01.39	
5	2	Nikolaos Sofianidis	Greece	2:01.66	
6	6	Geoffroy Mathieu	France	2:01.93	
7	1	Matteo Restivo	Italy	2:02.86	
8	7	Jan Giralt	Spain	2:03.03	
