= Swimming at the 2018 Mediterranean Games – Men's 50 metre butterfly =

Men's 50 metre butterfly at the 2018 Mediterranean Games
- Venue: Campclar Aquatic Center
- Location: Tarragona, Spain
- Dates: 24 June
- Competitors: 16 from 11 nations
- Winning time: 23.53

Medalists
gold medal	Kristian Golomeev	Greece
silver medal	Abdelrahman Elaraby	Egypt
bronze medal	Piero Codia	Italy

The men's 50 metre butterfly competition at the 2018 Mediterranean Games was held on 24 June 2018 at the Campclar Aquatic Center.

== Records ==
Prior to this competition, the existing world and Mediterranean Games records were as follows:

World record	Rafael Muñoz (ESP)	22.43	Málaga, Spain	5 April 2009
Mediterranean Games record	Ivan Lenđer (SRB)	23.50	Mersin, Turkey	24 June 2013

== Results ==
=== Heats ===
The heats were held at 10:12.

Rank	Heat	Lane	Name	Nationality	Time	Notes
1	2	3	Ümit Can Güreş	Turkey	23.70	Q, NR
2	2	5	Kristian Golomeev	Greece	24.00	Q
3	3	4	Piero Codia	Italy	24.01	Q
4	3	5	Abdelrahman Elaraby	Egypt	24.04	Q, NR
5	1	4	Andrea Vergani	Italy	24.27	Q
6	2	4	Ivan Lenđer	Serbia	24.32	Q
7	1	5	Alberto Lozano	Spain	24.53	Q
8	3	2	Adi Mešetović	Bosnia and Herzegovina	24.59	Q
9	1	3	Marcos García	Spain	24.71	
10	2	6	Andreas Vazaios	Greece	24.76	
11	3	3	Berk Özkul	Turkey	24.79	
12	1	6	Gal Kordež	Slovenia	25.11	
13	1	2	Ahmed Hussein	Egypt	25.13	
14	2	2	Bernat Lomero	Andorra	25.21	
15	3	6	Anthony Barbar	Lebanon	25.68	
16	3	7	Thomas Tsiopanis	Cyprus	26.03	
	2	7	Audai Hassouna	Libya	DNS	

=== Final ===
The final was held at 18:16.

Rank	Lane	Name	Nationality	Time	Notes
1st place, gold medalist(s)	5	Kristian Golomeev	Greece	23.53	NR
2nd place, silver medalist(s)	6	Abdelrahman Elaraby	Egypt	23.69	NR
3rd place, bronze medalist(s)	3	Piero Codia	Italy	23.74	
4	4	Ümit Can Güreş	Turkey	23.75	
5	2	Andrea Vergani	Italy	23.87	
6	7	Ivan Lenđer	Serbia	24.12	
7	1	Alberto Lozano	Spain	24.14	
8	8	Adi Mešetović	Bosnia and Herzegovina	24.39	NR
