= Rowing at the 2018 Mediterranean Games =

Sports event

- Venue: Canal Olímpic de Catalunya
- Dates: 28–30 June

The rowing competitions at the 2018 Mediterranean Games took place between 28 and 30 June at the Canal Olímpic de Catalunya in Castelldefels.

Athletes competed in 6 events.

== Medal summary ==
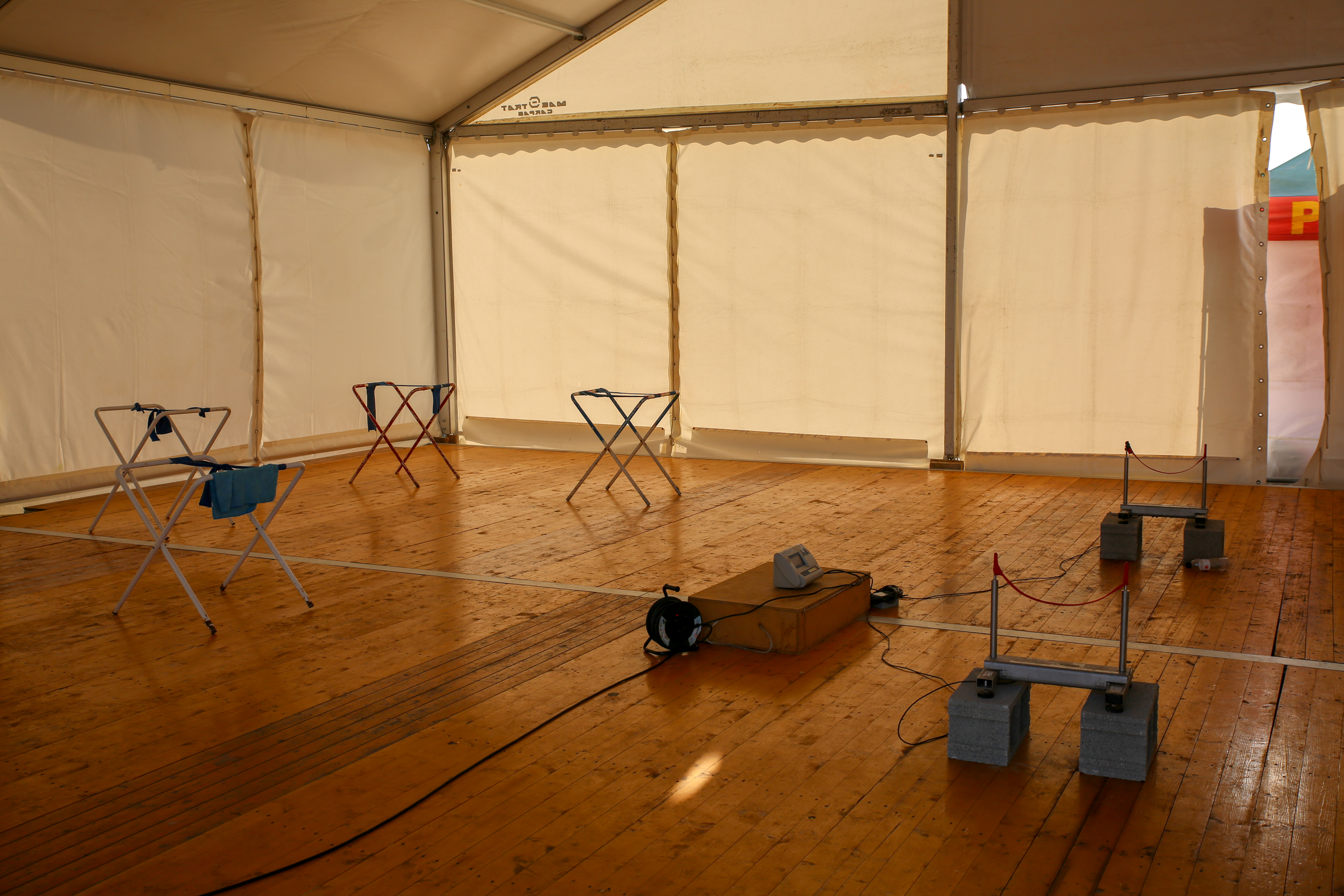
Weighing boats at the 2018 Mediterranean Games

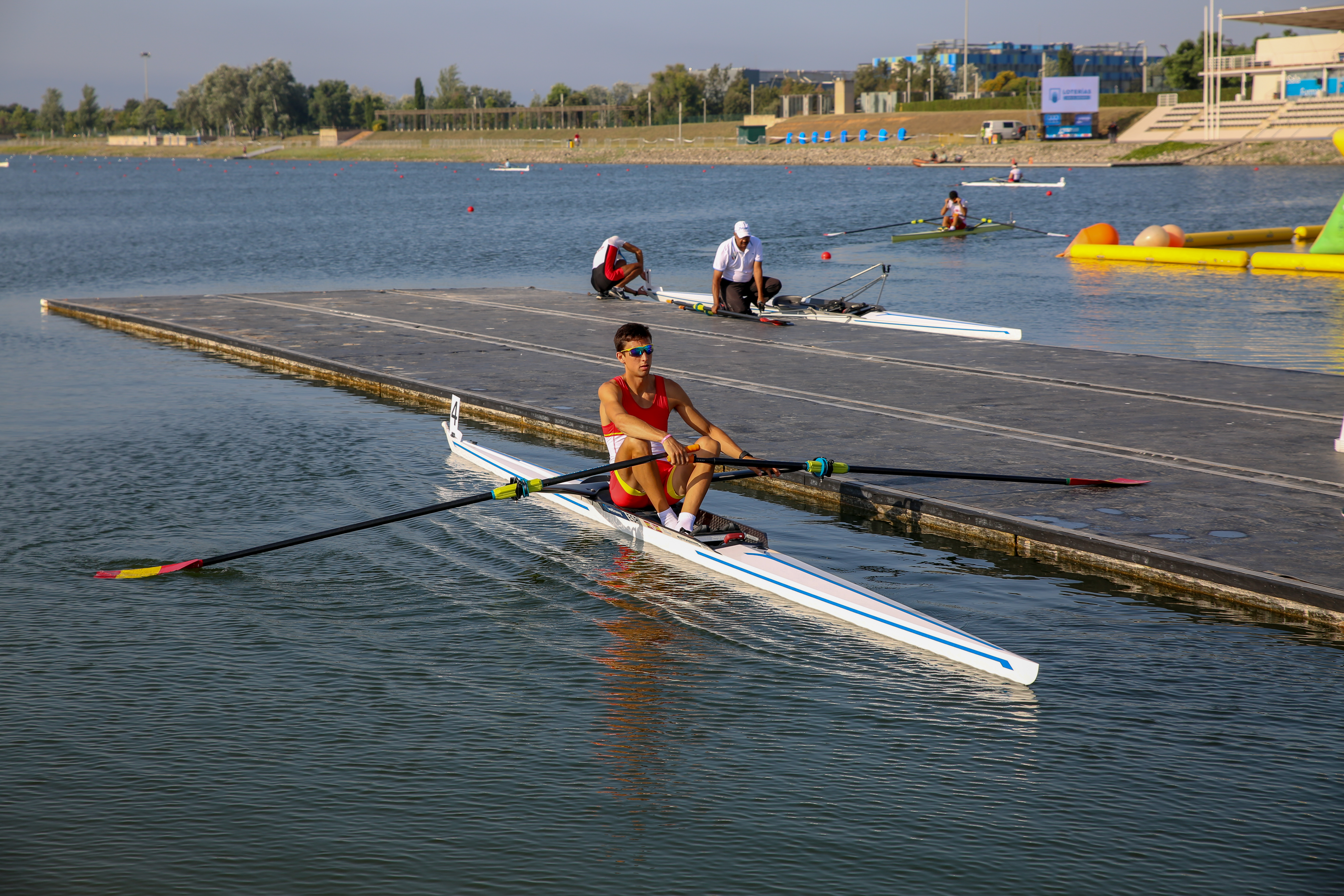
Alejandro Vera at the 2018 Mediterranean Games (LM1x)

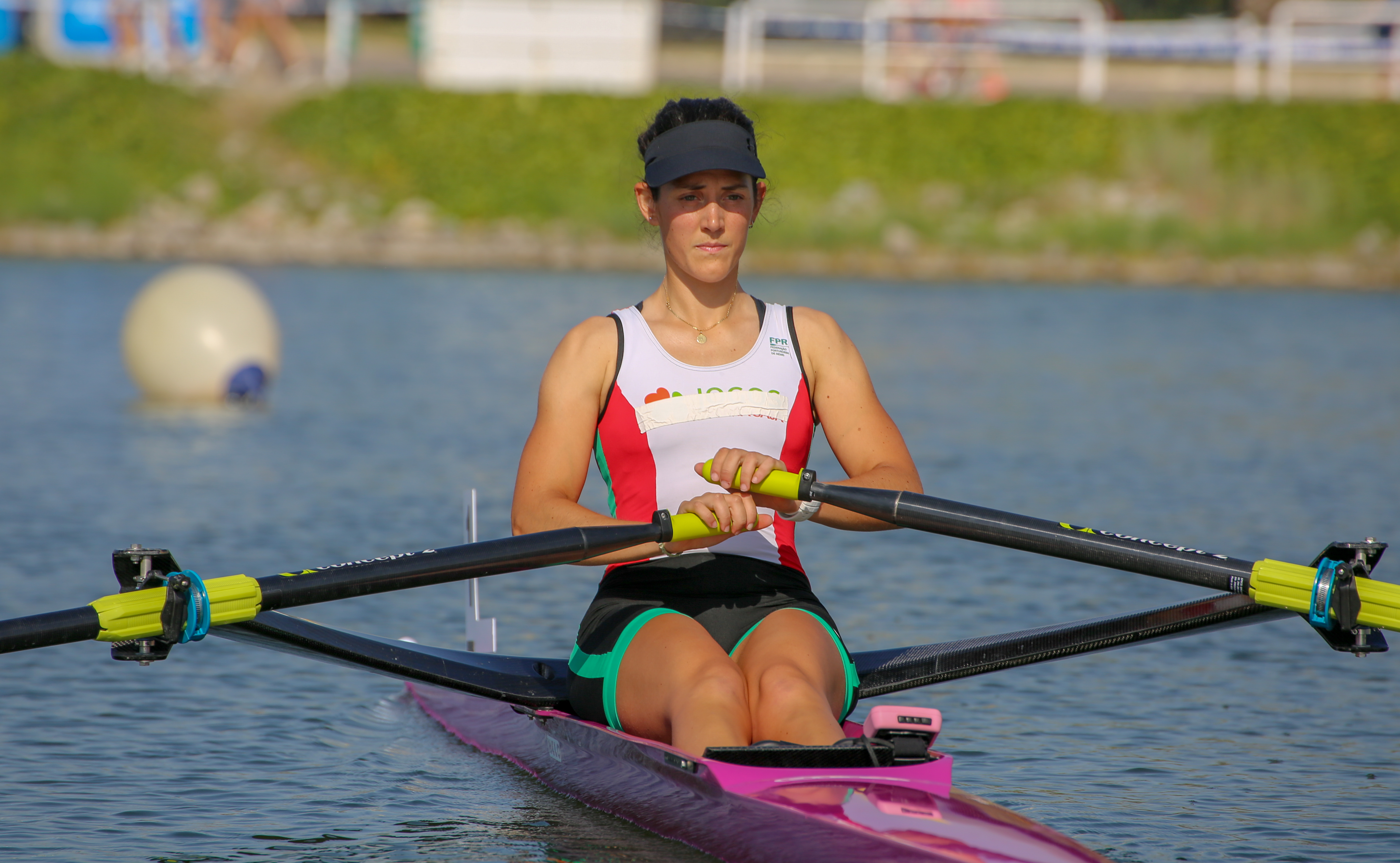
Joana Branco at the 2018 Mediterranean Games (LW1x)

=== Men's events ===
Event	Gold		Silver		Bronze	
M1x	Luca Rambaldi; Italy	3:14.757	Marko Marjanović; Serbia	3:16.628	Spyridon Kalentzis; Greece	3:22.843
M2x	Stefanos Douskos; Christos Stergiakas; Greece	2:58.983	Miha Aljančič; Nik Krebs; Slovenia	3:02.528	Romano Battisti; Simone Venier; Italy	3:04.824
LM1x	Luka Radonić; Croatia	3:22.584	Pedro Fraga; Portugal	3:23.004	Spyridon Giannaros; Greece	3:24.415
LM2x	Stefano Oppo; Pietro Ruta; Italy	3:03.266	Ioannis Marokos; Ninos Nikolaidis; Greece	3:04.342	Afonso Costa; Dinis Costa; Portugal	3:05.518

=== Women's events ===
Event	Gold		Silver		Bronze	
W1x	Aikaterini Nikolaidou; Greece	3:43.763	Kiri Tontodonati; Italy	3:47.306	Virginia Díaz; Spain	3:50.468
LW1x	Valentina Rodini; Italy	3:47.669	Thomais Emmanouilidou; Greece	3:52.490	Natalia Gómez; Spain	3:52.830

=== Medal table ===
* Host nation (Spain)

Rank	Nation	Gold	Silver	Bronze	Total
1	Italy	3	1	1	5
2	Greece	2	2	2	6
3	Croatia	1	0	0	1
4	Portugal	0	1	1	2
5	Serbia	0	1	0	1
5	Slovenia	0	1	0	1
7	Spain*	0	0	2	2
Totals (7 entries)		6	6	6	18
