= Swimming at the 2018 Mediterranean Games – Men's 50 metre backstroke =

Men's 50 metre backstroke at the 2018 Mediterranean Games
- Venue: Campclar Aquatic Center
- Location: Tarragona, Spain
- Dates: 23 June
- Competitors: 20 from 13 nations
- Winning time: 25.11

Medalists
gold medal	Simone Sabbioni	Italy
silver medal	Niccolò Bonacchi	Italy
bronze medal	Apostolos Christou	Greece

The men's 50 metre backstroke competition at the 2018 Mediterranean Games was held on 23 June 2018 at the Campclar Aquatic Center.

== Records ==
Prior to this competition, the existing world and Mediterranean Games records were as follows:

World record	Liam Tancock (GBR)	24.04	Rome, Italy	2 August 2009
Mediterranean Games record	Aschwin Wildeboer (ESP)	24.73	Pescara, Italy	27 June 2009

== Results ==
=== Heats ===
The heats were held at 09:55.

Rank	Heat	Lane	Name	Nationality	Time	Notes
1	3	4	Niccolò Bonacchi	Italy	25.34	Q
2	2	4	Apostolos Christou	Greece	25.43	Q
3	1	4	Simone Sabbioni	Italy	25.49	Q
4	1	5	Hugo González	Spain	25.59	Q
5	3	5	Nikolaos Sofianidis	Greece	25.90	Q
6	3	3	Youssef Said	Egypt	25.97	Q
7	2	3	Sergio Campos	Spain	26.03	Q
8	2	5	Alexis Santos	Portugal	26.18	Q
9	2	2	Tryfonas Hadjichristoforou	Cyprus	26.31	NR
10	1	2	Anže Ferš Eržen	Slovenia	26.44	
10	1	3	Gabriel José Lopes	Portugal	26.44	
12	2	6	İskender Baslakov	Turkey	26.62	
13	3	1	Driss Lahrichi	Morocco	26.68	
14	3	2	Vangelis Zorbis	Cyprus	26.93	
15	2	7	Anton Lončar	Croatia	27.24	
16	1	6	Geoffroy Mathieu	France	27.43	
17	3	3	Ege Başer	Turkey	27.51	
18	3	7	Ryad Bouhamidi	Algeria	27.59	
19	1	7	Abdelrahman Elaraby	Egypt	27.81	
20	2	1	Dion Kadriu	Bosnia and Herzegovina	30.43	

=== Final ===
The final was held at 17:54.

Rank	Lane	Name	Nationality	Time	Notes
1st place, gold medalist(s)	3	Simone Sabbioni	Italy	25.11	
2nd place, silver medalist(s)	4	Niccolò Bonacchi	Italy	25.21	
3rd place, bronze medalist(s)	5	Apostolos Christou	Greece	25.35	
4	6	Hugo González	Spain	25.56	
5	2	Nikolaos Sofianidis	Greece	25.71	
6	1	Sergio Campos	Spain	26.06	
7	8	Alexis Santos	Portugal	26.07	
7	7	Youssef Said	Egypt	26.07	
