= Swimming at the 2018 Mediterranean Games – Men's 50 metre breaststroke =

Men's 50 metre breaststroke at the 2018 Mediterranean Games
- Venue: Campclar Aquatic Center
- Location: Tarragona, Spain
- Dates: 25 June
- Competitors: 21 from 14 nations
- Winning time: 27.25

Medalists
gold medal	Fabio Scozzoli	Italy
silver medal	Čaba Silađi	Serbia
bronze medal	Peter John Stevens	Slovenia

The men's 50 metre breaststroke competition at the 2018 Mediterranean Games was held on 25 June 2018 at the Campclar Aquatic Center.

== Records ==
Prior to this competition, the existing world and Mediterranean Games records were as follows:

World record	Adam Peaty (GBR)	25.95	Budapest, Hungary	25 July 2017
Mediterranean Games record	Alessandro Terrin (ITA)	27.22	Pescara, Italy	1 July 2009

== Results ==
=== Heats ===
The heats were held at 09:36.

Rank	Heat	Lane	Name	Nationality	Time	Notes
1	3	5	Peter John Stevens	Slovenia	27.56	Q
2	2	4	Čaba Silađi	Serbia	27.58	Q
3	3	4	Fabio Scozzoli	Italy	27.74	Q
4	1	5	Hüseyin Emre Sakçı	Turkey	27.92	Q
5	3	3	Nikola Obrovac	Croatia	27.99	Q
6	2	3	Youssef Elkamash	Egypt	28.05	Q
7	2	5	Ioannis Karpouzlis	Greece	28.11	Q
8	1	4	Andrea Toniato	Italy	28.51	Q
9	1	3	Romanos Alyfantis	Greece	28.53	
10	2	6	Mario Navea	Spain	28.54	
11	3	2	Wassim Elloumi	Tunisia	28.70	
12	2	2	Markos Kalopsidiotis	Cyprus	29.01	
13	3	6	Berkay Ömer Öğretir	Turkey	29.08	
14	1	6	Aljaž Kerč	Slovenia	29.12	
15	1	2	Alexis Santos	Portugal	29.33	
16	2	7	Joan Ballester	Spain	29.73	
17	3	1	Gabriel José Lopes	Portugal	29.84	
18	2	1	Patrick Pelegrina	Andorra	29.86	
19	1	7	Moncef Balamane	Algeria	30.10	
20	3	7	Omiros Zagkas	Cyprus	30.62	
21	1	1	Dasar Xhambazi	Kosovo	32.11	

=== Final ===
The final was held at 17:36.

Rank	Lane	Name	Nationality	Time	Notes
1st place, gold medalist(s)	3	Fabio Scozzoli	Italy	27.25	
2nd place, silver medalist(s)	5	Čaba Silađi	Serbia	27.31	
3rd place, bronze medalist(s)	4	Peter John Stevens	Slovenia	27.32	
4	6	Hüseyin Emre Sakçı	Turkey	27.48	
5	1	Ioannis Karpouzlis	Greece	27.65	
6	2	Nikola Obrovac	Croatia	27.76	
7	8	Andrea Toniato	Italy	28.05	
8	7	Youssef Elkamash	Egypt	28.30	
