= Swimming at the 2018 Mediterranean Games – Men's 100 metre breaststroke =

Men's 100 metre breaststroke at the 2018 Mediterranean Games
- Venue: Campclar Aquatic Center
- Location: Tarragona, Spain
- Dates: 24 June
- Competitors: 18 from 13 nations
- Winning time: 1:00.36

Medalists
| gold medal | Fabio Scozzoli | Italy |
| silver medal | Čaba Silađi | Serbia |
| bronze medal | Berkay Öğretir | Turkey |

The men's 100 metre breaststroke competition at the 2018 Mediterranean Games was held on 24 June 2018 at the Campclar Aquatic Center.

== Records ==
Prior to this competition, the existing world and Mediterranean Games records were as follows:

| World record | Adam Peaty (GBR) | 57.13 | Rio de Janeiro, Brazil | 7 August 2016 |
| Mediterranean Games record | Melquíades Álvarez (ESP) | 1:00.45 | Pescara, Italy | 27 June 2009 |

The following records were established during the competition:

| Date | Event | Name | Nationality | Time | Record |
|---|---|---|---|---|---|
| 24 June | Final | Fabio Scozzoli | Italy | 1:00.36 | GR |

== Results ==
=== Heats ===
The heats were held at 10:03.

| Rank | Heat | Lane | Name | Nationality | Time | Notes |
|---|---|---|---|---|---|---|
| 1 | 2 | 4 | Čaba Silađi | Serbia | 1:00.67 | Q |
| 2 | 2 | 5 | Youssef Elkamash | Egypt | 1:01.35 | Q |
| 3 | 1 | 5 | Berkay Öğretir | Turkey | 1:01.68 | Q |
| 4 | 2 | 7 | Wassim Elloumi | Tunisia | 1:01.81 | Q, NR |
| 5 | 1 | 4 | Romanos Alyfantis | Greece | 1:02.01 | Q |
| 6 | 3 | 4 | Fabio Scozzoli | Italy | 1:02.02 | Q |
| 7 | 2 | 3 | Peter John Stevens | Slovenia | 1:02.05 | Q |
| 8 | 1 | 3 | Ioannis Karpouzlis | Greece | 1:02.08 | Q |
| 9 | 3 | 3 | Zaccaria Casna | Italy | 1:02.18 | |
| 10 | 3 | 5 | Hüseyin Emre Sakçı | Turkey | 1:02.32 | |
| 11 | 1 | 6 | Mario Navea | Spain | 1:02.41 | |
| 12 | 2 | 6 | Nikola Obrovac | Croatia | 1:02.45 | |
| 13 | 3 | 6 | Aljaž Kerč | Slovenia | 1:02.61 | |
| 14 | 3 | 2 | Joan Ballester | Spain | 1:03.51 | |
| 15 | 3 | 7 | Thomas Tsiopanis | Cyprus | 1:04.41 | NR |
| 16 | 1 | 2 | Moncef Balamane | Algeria | 1:04.43 | |
| 17 | 2 | 2 | Alexis Santos | Portugal | 1:04.46 | |
| 18 | 1 | 7 | Dasar Xhambazi | Kosovo | 1:11.51 | |

=== Final ===
The final was held at 18:00.

| Rank | Lane | Name | Nationality | Time | Notes |
|---|---|---|---|---|---|
| 1st place, gold medalist(s) | 7 | Fabio Scozzoli | Italy | 1:00.36 | GR |
| 2nd place, silver medalist(s) | 4 | Čaba Silađi | Serbia | 1:00.46 | |
| 3rd place, bronze medalist(s) | 3 | Berkay Öğretir | Turkey | 1:00.95 | |
| 4 | 6 | Wassim Elloumi | Tunisia | 1:01.61 | NR |
| 5 | 5 | Youssef Elkamash | Egypt | 1:01.64 | |
| 6 | 8 | Ioannis Karpouzlis | Greece | 1:02.28 | |
| 7 | 2 | Romanos Alyfantis | Greece | 1:02.52 | |
| 8 | 1 | Peter John Stevens | Slovenia | DSQ | |
