= Swimming at the 2018 Mediterranean Games – Men's 200 metre butterfly =

Event at the 2018 Mediterranean Games

Men's 200 metre butterfly at the 2018 Mediterranean Games
- Venue: Campclar Aquatic Center
- Location: Tarragona, Spain
- Dates: 25 June
- Competitors: 16 from 10 nations
- Winning time: 1:56.93

Medalists
gold medal	Velimir Stjepanović	Serbia
silver medal	Filippo Berlincioni	Italy
bronze medal	Stefanos Dimitriadis	Greece
bronze medal	Andreas Vazaios	Greece

The men's 200 metre butterfly competition at the 2018 Mediterranean Games was held on 25 June 2018 at the Campclar Aquatic Center.

== Records ==
Prior to this competition, the existing world and Mediterranean Games records were as follows:

World record	Michael Phelps (USA)	1:51.51	Rome, Italy	29 July 2009
Mediterranean Games record	Velimir Stjepanović (SRB)	1:56.19	Mersin, Turkey	25 June 2013

== Results ==
=== Heats ===
The heats were held at 09:41.

Rank	Heat	Lane	Name	Nationality	Time	Notes
1	2	5	Filippo Berlincioni	Italy	1:58.75	Q
2	3	4	Velimir Stjepanović	Serbia	1:59.43	Q
3	2	3	Francisco Chacón	Spain	1:59.48	Q
4	3	3	Christian Ferraro	Italy	1:59.88	Q
5	2	4	Stefanos Dimitriadis	Greece	2:00.02	Q
6	1	3	Andreas Vazaios	Greece	2:00.04	Q
7	1	4	Jordan Coelho	France	2:00.50	Q
8	1	5	Joan Lluís Pons	Spain	2:01.82	Q
9	3	5	Samet Alkan	Turkey	2:02.34	
10	2	7	Said Saber	Morocco	2:04.44	
11	2	2	Ahmed Hussein	Egypt	2:05.37	
12	3	2	Mohamed Masmoudi	Tunisia	2:05.78	
13	2	6	Mohamed Abdelbaky	Egypt	2:05.98	
14	1	6	Aleksa Bobar	Serbia	2:06.12	
15	3	7	Ramzi Chouchar	Algeria	2:07.97	
16	1	2	Erge Can Gezmiş	Turkey	2:11.48	

=== Final ===
The final was held at 17:52.

Rank	Lane	Name	Nationality	Time	Notes
1st place, gold medalist(s)	5	Velimir Stjepanović	Serbia	1:56.93	
2nd place, silver medalist(s)	4	Filippo Berlincioni	Italy	1:58.01	
3rd place, bronze medalist(s)	2	Stefanos Dimitriadis	Greece	1:58.16	
3rd place, bronze medalist(s)	7	Andreas Vazaios	Greece	1:58.16	
5	6	Christian Ferraro	Italy	1:58.38	
6	1	Jordan Coelho	France	1:58.82	
7	3	Francisco Chacón	Spain	1:59.04	
8	8	Joan Lluís Pons	Spain	2:02.02	
