= Swimming at the 2018 Mediterranean Games – Men's 100 metre backstroke =

Men's 100 metre backstroke at the 2018 Mediterranean Games
- Venue: Campclar Aquatic Center
- Location: Tarragona, Spain
- Dates: 24 June
- Competitors: 17 from 12 nations
- Winning time: 54.68

Medalists
gold medal	Apostolos Christou	Greece
silver medal	Simone Sabbioni	Italy
silver medal	Christopher Ciccarese	Italy

The men's 100 metre backstroke competition at the 2018 Mediterranean Games was held on 24 June 2018 at the Campclar Aquatic Center.

== Records ==
Prior to this competition, the existing world and Mediterranean Games records were as follows:

World record	Ryan Murphy (USA)	51.85	Rio de Janeiro, Brazil	13 August 2016
Mediterranean Games record	Aschwin Wildeboer (ESP)	52.38	Pescara, Italy	1 July 2009

== Results ==
=== Heats ===
The heats were held at 10:18.

Rank	Heat	Lane	Name	Nationality	Time	Notes
1	2	4	Simone Sabbioni	Italy	54.72	Q
2	1	7	Christopher Ciccarese	Italy	54.75	Q
3	1	5	Youssef Said	Egypt	55.74	Q
4	3	3	Gabriel José Lopes	Portugal	55.79	Q
5	2	3	Jorge Martín	Spain	56.26	Q
6	3	4	Apostolos Christou	Greece	56.64	Q
7	3	5	Nikolaos Sofianidis	Greece	56.80	Q
8	3	6	Anton Lončar	Croatia	56.97	Q
9	3	2	Anže Ferš Eržen	Slovenia	57.07	
10	1	6	Ege Başer	Turkey	57.32	
11	2	5	Juan Segura	Spain	57.37	
12	2	6	Francisco Santos	Portugal	57.43	
13	1	3	Geoffroy Mathieu	France	57.54	
14	2	7	Driss Lahrichi	Morocco	57.77	
15	1	2	Filippos Iakovidis	Cyprus	57.98	
16	2	2	Ryad Bouhamidi	Algeria	58.51	
17	3	7	Tryfonas Hadjichristoforou	Cyprus	58.67	

=== Final ===
The final was held at 18:32.

Rank	Lane	Name	Nationality	Time	Notes
1st place, gold medalist(s)	7	Apostolos Christou	Greece	54.68	
2nd place, silver medalist(s)	4	Simone Sabbioni	Italy	54.77	
2nd place, silver medalist(s)	5	Christopher Ciccarese	Italy	54.77	
4	1	Nikolaos Sofianidis	Greece	55.23	
5	6	Gabriel José Lopes	Portugal	55.77	
6	2	Jorge Martín	Spain	55.88	
7	8	Anton Lončar	Croatia	56.22	
8	3	Youssef Said	Egypt	56.48	
