= Swimming at the 2018 Mediterranean Games – Men's 4 × 100 metre medley relay =

International sporting competition

Men's 4 × 100 metre medley relay at the 2018 Mediterranean Games
- Venue: Campclar Aquatic Center
- Location: Tarragona, Spain
- Dates: 25 June
- Competitors: 32 from 8 nations
- Winning time: 3:36.64

Medalists
gold medal	Apostolos Christou; Ioannis Karpouzlis; Stefanos Dimitriadis; Kristian Golomeev	Greece
silver medal	Velimir Stjepanović; Čaba Silađi; Ivan Lenđer; Aleksa Bobar	Serbia
bronze medal	Ege Başer; Berkay Öğretir; Ümit Can Güreş; Kemal Arda Gürdal	Turkey

The men's 4 × 100 metre medley relay event at the 2018 Mediterranean Games was held on 25 June 2018 at the Campclar Aquatic Center.

== Records ==
Prior to this competition, the existing world and Mediterranean Games records were as follows:

World record	United States	3:27.28	Rome, Italy	2 August 2009
Mediterranean Games record	Spain	3:34.22	Pescara, Italy	1 July 2009

== Results ==
The final was held at 19:18.

Rank	Lane	Nation	Swimmers	Time	Notes
1st place, gold medalist(s)	6	Greece	Apostolos Christou (54.56); Ioannis Karpouzlis (1:01.71); Stefanos Dimitriadis (52.34); Kristian Golomeev (48.03)	3:36.64	
2nd place, silver medalist(s)	4	Serbia	Velimir Stjepanović (55.75); Čaba Silađi (59.92); Ivan Lenđer (52.68); Aleksa Bobar (50.09)	3:38.44	NR
3rd place, bronze medalist(s)	5	Turkey	Ege Başer (57.36); Berkay Öğretir (1:00.29); Ümit Can Güreş (51.94); Kemal Arda Gürdal (49.79)	3:39.38	NR
4	3	Spain	Hugo González (55.44); Mario Navea (1:01.74); Alberto Lozano (53.12); Moritz Berg (49.55)	3:39.85	
5	1	Egypt	Youssef Said (55.89); Youssef Elkamash (1:01.42); Marwan Elkamash (55.42); Ali Khalafalla (49.67)	3:42.40	
6	7	Portugal	Gabriel Lópes (55.94); Tomás Veloso (1:03.99); Miguel Nascimento (55.43); Alexis Santos (51.28)	3:46.64	
	8	Italy	Simone Sabbioni; Fabio Scozzoli; Piero Codia; Alessandro Miressi	DSQ	
	2	Cyprus	Filippos Iakovidis; Thomas Tsiopanis; Tryfonas Hadjichristoforou; Omiros Zagkas	DSQ	
