= Aleyna Özkan =

Turkish swimmer (born 2002)

Personal information
- Born: 1 February 2002 (age 24)

Sport
- Sport: Swimming
- College team: Duke University
Medal record
Women's swimming
Representing Turkey
Islamic Solidarity Games
Gold medal – first place	2017 Baku	50 m butterfly
Gold medal – first place	2017 Baku	100 m butterfly
Gold medal – first place	2017 Baku	4×100 m medley
Bronze medal – third place	2021 Konya	50 m butterfly
European Junior Championships
Bronze medal – third place	2018 Helsinki	50 m butterfly
Bronze medal – third place	2019 Kazan	4×100 m mixed medley

Aleyna Özkan (born 1 February 2002) is a Turkish swimmer, born to Turkish parents.

She competed in the women's 50 metre butterfly and women's 100 metre butterfly events at the 2018 Mediterranean Games held in Tarragona, Spain. In the same year, she also competed in the girls' 50 metre butterfly, girls' 100 metre butterfly and girls' 200 metre butterfly events at the 2018 Summer Youth Olympics held in Buenos Aires, Argentina.

In 2019, she represented Turkey at the World Aquatics Championships held in Gwangju, South Korea. She competed in the women's 50 metre butterfly and women's 100 metre butterfly events. She also competed in the women's 4 × 100 metre medley relay event.

In 2020, she joined the Duke University swimming and diving team.
