= Swimming at the 2018 Mediterranean Games – Men's 200 metre individual medley =

Swimming at the 2018 Mediterranean games

Men's 200 metre individual medley at the 2018 Mediterranean Games
- Venue: Campclar Aquatic Center
- Location: Tarragona, Spain
- Dates: 23 June
- Competitors: 17 from 11 nations
- Winning time: 1:59.40

Medalists
| gold medal | Andreas Vazaios | Greece |
| silver medal | Hugo González | Spain |
| bronze medal | Alexis Santos | Portugal |

The men's 200 metre individual medley competition at the 2018 Mediterranean Games was held on 23 June 2018 at the Campclar Aquatic Center.

== Records ==
Prior to this competition, the existing world and Mediterranean Games records were as follows:

| World record | Ryan Lochte (USA) | 1:54.00 | Shanghai, China | 28 July 2011 |
| Mediterranean Games record | Oussama Mellouli (TUN) | 1:58.38 | Pescara, Italy | 27 June 2009 |

== Results ==
=== Heats ===
The heats were held at 10:25.

| Rank | Heat | Lane | Name | Nationality | Time | Notes |
|---|---|---|---|---|---|---|
| 1 | 3 | 4 | Andreas Vazaios | Greece | 2:00.84 | Q |
| 2 | 2 | 4 | Hugo González | Spain | 2:02.26 | Q |
| 3 | 3 | 5 | Federico Turrini | Italy | 2:02.27 | Q |
| 4 | 3 | 3 | Albert Puig | Spain | 2:02.56 | Q |
| 5 | 1 | 4 | Alexis Santos | Portugal | 2:02.92 | Q |
| 6 | 1 | 5 | Georgios Spanoudakis | Greece | 2:03.08 | Q |
| 7 | 2 | 5 | Gabriel José Lopes | Portugal | 2:03.10 | Q |
| 8 | 2 | 3 | Pier Andrea Matteazzi | Italy | 2:03.65 | Q |
| 9 | 1 | 6 | Samet Alkan | Turkey | 2:04.42 | |
| 10 | 1 | 3 | Guillaume Laure | France | 2:04.55 | |
| 11 | 2 | 6 | Alpkan Örnek | Turkey | 2:04.89 | |
| 12 | 3 | 6 | Samy Helmbacher | France | 2:05.00 | |
| 13 | 2 | 2 | Anže Ferš Eržen | Slovenia | 2:06.30 | |
| 14 | 3 | 2 | Thomas Tsiopanis | Cyprus | 2:06.30 | |
| 15 | 1 | 2 | Ramzi Chouchar | Algeria | 2:07.22 | |
| 16 | 2 | 7 | Said Saber | Morocco | 2:11.70 | |
| 17 | 3 | 7 | Omar Eltonbary | Egypt | 2:12.54 | |

=== Final ===
The final was held at 18:40.

| Rank | Lane | Name | Nationality | Time | Notes |
|---|---|---|---|---|---|
| 1st place, gold medalist(s) | 4 | Andreas Vazaios | Greece | 1:59.40 | |
| 2nd place, silver medalist(s) | 5 | Hugo González | Spain | 2:00.53 | |
| 3rd place, bronze medalist(s) | 2 | Alexis Santos | Portugal | 2:00.83 | |
| 4 | 3 | Federico Turrini | Italy | 2:01.14 | |
| 5 | 7 | Georgios Spanoudakis | Greece | 2:01.85 | |
| 6 | 1 | Gabriel José Lopes | Portugal | 2:02.46 | |
| 7 | 8 | Pier Andrea Matteazzi | Italy | 2:03.30 | |
| 8 | 6 | Albert Puig | Spain | 2:03.89 | |
