= San Marino at the 2018 Mediterranean Games =

- IOC code: SMR
- NOC: Sammarinese National Olympic Committee
- Competitors: 16 in 7 sports
- Medals Ranked 18th: Gold 2 Silver 0 Bronze 0 Total 2

Mediterranean Games appearances (overview)
- 1987; 1991; 1993; 1997; 2001; 2005; 2009; 2013; 2018; 2022

San Marino competed at the 2018 Mediterranean Games in Tarragona, Spain from 22 June to 1 July 2018.

== Medal summary ==
=== Medal table ===
Medal	Name	Sport	Event	Date
Gold	Alessandra Perilli	Shooting	Women's trap	24 June
Gold	Enrico Dall'Olmo	Boules	Men's Raffa − Individual	30 June

== Athletics ==
Men
Track & road events

Athlete	Event	Semifinals		Final	
Athlete	Event	Result	Rank	Result	Rank
Francesco Molinari	100 m	11.13	14	Did not advance	
Francesco Molinari	200 m	21.81	14	Did not advance	
Andrea Ercolani Volta	400 m hurdles	53.14	14	Did not advance	

Field events

Athlete	Event	Qualification		Final	
Athlete	Event	Result	Rank	Result	Rank
Matteo Mosconi	High jump	—		2.05	8
Eugenio Rossi	High jump	—		2.15	6

== Boules ==
Men

Athlete	Event	Group stage		Semifinal	Final / BM	
Athlete	Event	Pool Scores	Rank	Opposition Score	Opposition Score	Rank
Enrico Dall'Olmo	Raffa − Individual	Alswesi (LBA) W 12–10; Stjepčević (MNE) W 12–4; Nanni (ITA) L 1–12; Farrugia (MLT) W 12–8; Rouault (FRA) W 12–10; Belhouchet (ALG) W 12–5; Şimşek (TUR) W 11–9	2 Q	Farrugia (MLT); W 9–7	Nanni (ITA); W 12–2	1st place, gold medalist(s)

== Cycling ==
Men

Athlete	Event	Time	Rank
Federico Olei	Men's road race	4:03:13	38

== Shooting ==
Men

Athlete	Event	Qualification		Final	
Athlete	Event	Points	Rank	Points	Rank
Gian Marco Berti	Trap	115	19	Did not advance	
Mirko Ottaviani	Trap	115	20	Did not advance	

Women

Athlete	Event	Qualification		Final	
Athlete	Event	Points	Rank	Points	Rank
Alessandra Perilli	Trap	113	4 Q	41+3	1st place, gold medalist(s)

== Swimming ==
Women

Athlete	Event	Heat		Final	
Athlete	Event	Time	Rank	Time	Rank
Elisa Bernardi	200 m freestyle	2:09.69	16	Did not advance	
Beatrice Felici	50 m freestyle	27.74	20	Did not advance	
Beatrice Felici	50 m butterfly	28.64	16	Did not advance	
Beatrice Felici	100 m butterfly	1:04.17	15	Did not advance	
Beatrice Felici	200 m butterfly	2:35.41	11	Did not advance	
Sara Lettoli	50 m freestyle	27.88	21	Did not advance	
Sara Lettoli	100 m freestyle	59.62	19	Did not advance	
Sara Lettoli	200 m freestyle	2:09.80	17	Did not advance	
Sara Lettoli	400 m freestyle	4:30.56	14	Did not advance	
Arianna Valloni	400 m freestyle	4:24.25	12	Did not advance	
Arianna Valloni	800 m freestyle	8:51.84	10	Did not advance	
Elisa Bernardi; Sara Lettoli; Beatrice Felici; Arianna Valloni	4 × 200 m freestyle relay	—		8:37.67	8

== Table tennis ==
Athlete	Event	Group stage 1		Group stage 2		Quarterfinal	Semifinal	Final / BM	
Athlete	Event	Pool Scores	Rank	Pool Scores	Rank	Opposition Score	Opposition Score	Opposition Score	Rank
Chiara Morri	Women's singles	Lupulesku (SRB) L 0–4; Khoury (LBN) L 1–4; Zarif (FRA) L 0–4	4	Did not advance					

== Taekwondo ==
Men

Athlete	Event	Round of 16	Quarterfinal	Semifinal	Final	
Athlete	Event	Opposition Result	Opposition Result	Opposition Result	Opposition Result	Rank
Michele Ceccaroni	−68 kg	Chellamootoo (FRA); L 3–23 (PTG)	Did not advance			
Francesco Maiani	−80 kg	Fejzić (SRB); L 4–12	Did not advance			
