= Ümitcan Güreş =

Turkish swimmer (born 1999)

Personal information
- Nationality: Turkish
- Born: 24 June 1999 (age 27) Istanbul, Turkey

Sport
- Sport: Swimming
- Strokes: Butterfly
- College team: Harvard
Medal record
Men's swimming
Representing Turkey
European Championships (SC)
| Bronze medal – third place | 2019 Glasgow | 50 m butterfly |
Mediterranean Games
| Bronze medal – third place | 2018 Tarragona | 100 m butterfly |
| Bronze medal – third place | 2018 Tarragona | 4×100 m medley |
| Bronze medal – third place | 2022 Oran | 4×100 m medley |
Islamic Solidarity Games
| Silver medal – second place | 2021 Konya | 100 m butterfly |
| Silver medal – second place | 2021 Konya | 4x100 m medley relay |
| Bronze medal – third place | 2021 Konya | 50 m butterfly |
European Junior Championships
| Gold medal – first place | 2017 Netanya | 50 m butterfly |

Ümitcan Güreş (born 24 June 1999), also known as Ümit Can Güreş, is a Turkish swimmer. He competed in the men's 50 metre butterfly event at the 2018 FINA World Swimming Championships (25 m), in Hangzhou, China. He also competes for Harvard Crimson.
