= Swimming at the 2018 Mediterranean Games – Women's 50 metre butterfly =

Swimming competition

Women's 50 metre butterfly at the 2018 Mediterranean Games
- Venue: Campclar Aquatic Center
- Location: Tarragona, Spain
- Dates: 24 June
- Competitors: 18 from 11 nations
- Winning time: 25.48

Medalists
gold medal	Farida Osman	Egypt
silver medal	Elena Di Liddo	Italy
bronze medal	Marie Wattel	France

The women's 50 metre butterfly competition at the 2018 Mediterranean Games was held on 24 June 2018 at the Campclar Aquatic Center.

== Records ==
Prior to this competition, the existing world and Mediterranean Games records were as follows:

World record	Sarah Sjöström (SWE)	24.43	Borås, Sweden	5 July 2014
Mediterranean Games record	Farida Osman (EGY)	26.15	Mersin, Turkey	24 June 2013

The following records were established during the competition:

Date	Event	Name	Nationality	Time	Record
24 June	Heats	Farida Osman	Egypt	25.86	GR
24 June	Final	Farida Osman	Egypt	25.48	GR

== Results ==
=== Heats ===
The heats were held at 10:15.

Rank	Heat	Lane	Name	Nationality	Time	Notes
1	3	4	Farida Osman	Egypt	25.86	Q, GR
2	3	5	Elena Di Liddo	Italy	26.24	Q
3	1	4	Anna Ntountounaki	Greece	26.30	Q, NR
4	3	3	Aleyna Özkan	Turkey	26.84	Q, NR
5	1	7	Léna Bousquin	France	26.88	Q
6	2	5	Elena Gemo	Italy	26.93	Q
7	1	5	Kristel Vourna	Greece	27.09	Q
8	2	4	Marie Wattel	France	27.30	Q
9	1	3	Amina Kajtaz	Bosnia and Herzegovina	27.50	
10	1	6	Sezin Eligul	Turkey	27.53	
11	2	3	Lidón Muñoz	Spain	27.73	
12	2	6	María Herrero	Spain	28.10	
13	3	6	Amel Melih	Algeria	28.14	
14	3	2	Ana Monteiro	Portugal	28.24	
15	1	2	Nesrine Medjahed	Algeria	28.54	
16	3	7	Beatrice Felici	San Marino	28.64	
17	2	2	Inês Fernandes	Portugal	29.15	
18	2	7	Tonia Papapetrou	Cyprus	29.23	

=== Final ===
The final was held at 18:19.

Rank	Lane	Name	Nationality	Time	Notes
1st place, gold medalist(s)	4	Farida Osman	Egypt	25.48	GR
2nd place, silver medalist(s)	5	Elena Di Liddo	Italy	26.21	
3rd place, bronze medalist(s)	8	Marie Wattel	France	26.48	
4	3	Anna Ntountounaki	Greece	26.57	
5	1	Kristel Vourna	Greece	26.84	
6	6	Aleyna Özkan	Turkey	26.91	
7	7	Elena Gemo	Italy	26.95	
8	2	Léna Bousquin	France	27.21	
