= Swimming at the 2018 Mediterranean Games – Women's 50 metre freestyle =

Women's 50 metre freestyle at the 2018 Mediterranean Games
- Venue: Campclar Aquatic Center
- Location: Tarragona, Spain
- Dates: 25 June
- Competitors: 23 from 15 nations
- Winning time: 24.83

Medalists
gold medal	Farida Osman	Egypt
silver medal	Lidón Muñoz	Spain
bronze medal	Theodora Drakou	Greece

The women's 50 metre freestyle competition at the 2018 Mediterranean Games was held on 25 June 2018 at the Campclar Aquatic Center.

== Records ==
Prior to this competition, the existing world and Mediterranean Games records were as follows:

World record	Sarah Sjöström (SWE)	23.67	Budapest, Hungary	29 July 2017
Mediterranean Games record	Malia Metella (FRA)	24.88	Pescara, Italy	28 June 2009

The following records were established during the competition:

Date	Event	Name	Nationality	Time	Record
25 June	Final	Farida Osman	Egypt	24.83	GR

== Results ==
=== Heats ===
The heats were held at 09:33.

Rank	Heat	Lane	Name	Nationality	Time	Notes
1	3	4	Farida Osman	Egypt	25.25	Q
2	3	5	Lidón Muñoz	Spain	25.29	Q
3	1	4	Theodora Drakou	Greece	25.57	Q
4	1	5	Lucrezia Raco	Italy	25.63	Q
5	2	4	Marie Wattel	France	25.64	Q
6	2	5	Erika Ferraioli	Italy	25.77	Q
7	3	6	Sofia Klikopoulou	Greece	25.82	Q
8	1	3	Kalia Antoniou	Cyprus	25.85	Q
9	3	3	Léna Bousquin	France	25.90	
10	2	3	Neža Klančar	Slovenia	25.97	
11	2	6	Marta González	Spain	26.06	
12	1	6	Selen Özbilen	Turkey	26.09	
13	3	2	Amel Melih	Algeria	26.57	
14	1	2	Sezin Eligül	Turkey	26.75	
15	2	7	Nesrine Medjahed	Algeria	26.91	
16	2	2	Lamija Medošević	Bosnia and Herzegovina	27.01	
17	3	8	Nikol Merizaj	Albania	27.21	NR
18	3	7	Tonia Papapetrou	Cyprus	27.25	
19	3	1	Mónica Ramírez	Andorra	27.29	
20	1	7	Beatrice Felici	San Marino	27.74	
21	1	1	Sara Lettoli	San Marino	27.88	
22	2	1	Inês Fernandes	Portugal	28.00	
23	2	8	Fjorda Shabani	Kosovo	28.49	

=== Final ===
The final was held at 17:33.

Rank	Lane	Name	Nationality	Time	Notes
1st place, gold medalist(s)	4	Farida Osman	Egypt	24.83	GR
2nd place, silver medalist(s)	5	Lidón Muñoz	Spain	25.20	=NR
3rd place, bronze medalist(s)	3	Theodora Drakou	Greece	25.31	
4	2	Marie Wattel	France	25.35	
5	6	Lucrezia Raco	Italy	25.40	
6	1	Sofia Klikopoulou	Greece	25.77	
7	7	Erika Ferraioli	Italy	25.79	
8	8	Kalia Antoniou	Cyprus	26.01	
