= Swimming at the 2018 Mediterranean Games – Women's 800 metre freestyle =

Women's 800 metre freestyle at the 2018 Mediterranean Games
- Venue: Campclar Aquatic Center
- Location: Tarragona, Spain
- Dates: 23 June
- Competitors: 13 from 8 nations
- Winning time: 8:21.44

Medalists
gold medal	Simona Quadarella	Italy
silver medal	Mireia Belmonte	Spain
bronze medal	Tjaša Oder	Slovenia

The women's 800 metre freestyle competition at the 2018 Mediterranean Games was held on 23 June 2018 at the Campclar Aquatic Center.

== Records ==
Prior to this competition, the existing world and Mediterranean Games records were as follows:

World record	Katie Ledecky (USA)	8:04.79	Rio de Janeiro, Brazil	12 August 2016
Mediterranean Games record	Alessia Filippi (ITA)	8:20.78	Pescara, Italy	30 June 2009

== Results ==
The heats were held at 09:30 and 17:30.

Rank	Heat	Lane	Name	Nationality	Time	Notes
1st place, gold medalist(s)	2	4	Simona Quadarella	Italy	8:21.44	
2nd place, silver medalist(s)	2	6	Mireia Belmonte	Spain	8:26.55	
3rd place, bronze medalist(s)	2	5	Tjaša Oder	Slovenia	8:28.91	
4	2	2	Diana Durães	Portugal	8:29.33	NR
5	2	1	Jimena Pérez	Spain	8:36.41	
6	2	3	Diletta Carli	Italy	8:38.44	
7	2	7	Tamila Holub	Portugal	8:44.78	
8	2	8	Sara Račnik	Slovenia	8:50.00	
9	1	4	Kalliopi Araouzou	Greece	8:50.51	
10	1	3	Arianna Valloni	San Marino	8:51.84	NR
11	1	5	Beril Böcekler	Turkey	8:52.97	
12	1	6	Afroditi Katsiara	Greece	9:03.11	
13	1	2	Gabriella Doueihy	Lebanon	9:10.16	
