= Swimming at the 2018 Mediterranean Games – Women's 100 metre butterfly =

Women's 100 metre butterfly at the 2018 Mediterranean Games
- Venue: Campclar Aquatic Center
- Location: Tarragona, Spain
- Dates: 23 June
- Competitors: 17 from 11 nations
- Winning time: 57.59

Medalists
gold medal	Elena Di Liddo	Italy
silver medal	Farida Osman	Egypt
bronze medal	Anna Ntountounaki	Greece

The women's 100 metre butterfly competition at the 2018 Mediterranean Games was held on 23 June 2018 at the Campclar Aquatic Center.

== Records ==
Prior to this competition, the existing world and Mediterranean Games records were as follows:

World record	Sarah Sjöström (SWE)	55.48	Rio de Janeiro, Brazil	7 August 2016
Mediterranean Games record	Ilaria Bianchi (ITA)	58.63	Mersin, Turkey	22 June 2013

The following records were established during the competition:

Date	Event	Name	Nationality	Time	Record
23 June	Heats	Elena Di Liddo	Italy	57.97	GR
23 June	Final	Elena Di Liddo	Italy	57.59	GR

== Results ==
=== Heats ===
The heats were held at 10:06.

Rank	Heat	Lane	Name	Nationality	Time	Notes
1	2	4	Elena Di Liddo	Italy	57.97	Q, GR
2	3	4	Marie Wattel	France	59.46	Q
3	2	5	Kristel Vourna	Greece	59.62	Q
4	2	6	Amina Kajtaz	Bosnia and Herzegovina	59.87	Q, NR
5	3	5	Anna Ntountounaki	Greece	59.94	Q
6	1	4	Farida Osman	Egypt	1:00.10	Q
7	1	3	Aleyna Özkan	Turkey	1:00.27	Q
8	1	5	Claudia Tarzia	Italy	1:00.31	Q
9	2	3	Ana Monteiro	Portugal	1:00.42	
10	2	2	Tara Vovk	Slovenia	1:01.02	
11	3	6	Anja Klinar	Slovenia	1:01.10	
12	3	2	Aina Hierro	Spain	1:01.77	
13	1	2	Celeste Guerrero	Spain	1:03.36	
14	1	6	Inês Fernandes	Portugal	1:04.34	
15	3	7	Beatrice Felici	San Marino	1:04.17	
16	2	7	Nesrine Medjahed	Algeria	1:04.77	
17	1	7	Samar Kacha	Algeria	1:06.21	
	3	3	Viktoriya Zeynep Güneş	Turkey	DNS	

=== Final ===
The final was held at 18:08.

Rank	Lane	Name	Nationality	Time	Notes
1st place, gold medalist(s)	4	Elena Di Liddo	Italy	57.59	GR
2nd place, silver medalist(s)	7	Farida Osman	Egypt	58.51	
3rd place, bronze medalist(s)	2	Anna Ntountounaki	Greece	58.78	
4	5	Marie Wattel	France	58.98	
5	3	Kristel Vourna	Greece	59.48	
6	6	Amina Kajtaz	Bosnia and Herzegovina	59.87	
7	8	Claudia Tarzia	Italy	1:00.27	
8	1	Aleyna Özkan	Turkey	1:00.71	
