= Bayram Malkan =

Turkish boxer (born 1999)

Personal information
- Nationality: Turkish
- Born: 20 February 1999 (age 27) Ağrı, Turkey
- Height: 1.73 m (5 ft 8 in)
- Weight: 81 kg (179 lb)

Boxing career
Medal record
Men's amateur boxing
Representing Turkey
Mediterranean Games
Silver medal – second place	2018 Tarragona	Light heavyweight

Bayram Malkan (born 20 February 1999) is a Turkish boxer in the light heavyweight (-81 kg) discipline. He received a quota for the 2020 Summer Olympics.

Bayram Malkan was born in Ağrı, Turkey on 20 February 1999.

He won the silver medal at the 2018 Mediterranean Games in Tarragona, Spain. He competed at the 2019 AIBA World Championships in Yekaterinburg, Russia, and the 2019 European Games in Minsk, Belarus. He obtained a quota for the 2020 Summer Olympics.
