= Athanasia Fakidi =

Greek sailor

Personal information
- Nationality: Greek
- Born: 27 September 1996 (age 29)
- Height: 1.68 m (5 ft 6 in)
- Weight: 67 kg (148 lb)

Sport
- Country: Greece
- Sport: Sailing
- Event: Laser radial
Medal record
Mediterranean Games
Gold medal – first place	2018 Tarragona	Laser Radial

Athanasia Fakidi is a Greek sailor. She won a gold medal at the 2018 Mediterranean Games.
