= Ioli Mytilineou =

Irish equestrian (born 1997)

Personal information
- Born: 29 July 1997 (age 28) Athens, Greece

Sport
- Country: Greece
- Sport: Equestrian
- Coached by: Sean Crooks

Achievements and titles
- World finals: 2022 FEI World Equestrian Games

Ioli Mytilineou (Greek: Ιόλη Μυτιληναίου, born 29 July 1997, Athens, Greece) is a Greek equestrian competing in show jumping. She is the daughter of Olympic show jumper Hannah Roberson-Mytilinaiou. She competed at the 2022 FEI World Equestrian Games and at the 2021 and 2023 European Championships in Riesenbeck and Milan. She is currently the highest ranked Greek rider in the FEI World Ranking in Show-Jumping.

She was selected to represent Greece at the 2024 Summer Olympics in Paris as individual rider after placing second on the FEI Olympic Ranking Group C. She subsequently became the first Greek equestrian to compete at the Olympics since the 2004 Summer Olympics.
