= Konstantina Benteli =

Greek weightlifter (born 1993)

Personal information
- Nationality: Greek
- Born: 24 August 1993 (age 32)
- Height: 1.65 m (5 ft 5 in)
- Weight: 58 kg (128 lb)

Sport
- Country: Greece
- Sport: Weightlifting
Medal record
Mediterranean Games
Gold medal – first place	2018 Tarragona	−58 kg Snatch
Silver medal – second place	2018 Tarragona	−58 kg Clean & Jerk

Konstantina Benteli is a Greek weightlifter from Thessaloniki. She is the owner of 3 national records. She won one gold and one silver medal at the 2018 Mediterranean Games.
