= Georgios Vasiliadis =

Greek footballer

Personal information
- Full name: Georgios Vasiliadis
- Date of birth: 10 June 1996 (age 30)
- Place of birth: Thessaloniki, Greece
- Height: 1.90 m (6 ft 3 in)
- Position: Goalkeeper

Team information
- Current team: Apollon Larissa
- Number: 96

Youth career
- 2012–2014: Veria

Senior career*
Years	Team	Apps	(Gls)
2014–2016	Veria	0	(0)
2016–2017	Ergotelis	16	(0)
2017–2018	Doxa Drama	0	(0)
2018–2019	Platanias	6	(0)
2019–	Apollon Larissa	0	(0)

International career^{‡}
2014	Greece U19	2	(0)
- * Club domestic league appearances and goals as of 16 March 2019 ‡ National team caps and goals as of 17 November 2014

Georgios Vasiliadis (Greek: Γεώργιος Βασιλειάδης; born 10 June 1996) is a Greek professional footballer who plays as a goalkeeper for Super League 2 club Apollon Larissa.
