= Campolara =

Coordinates: 42°07′N 3°25′W

- Municipality
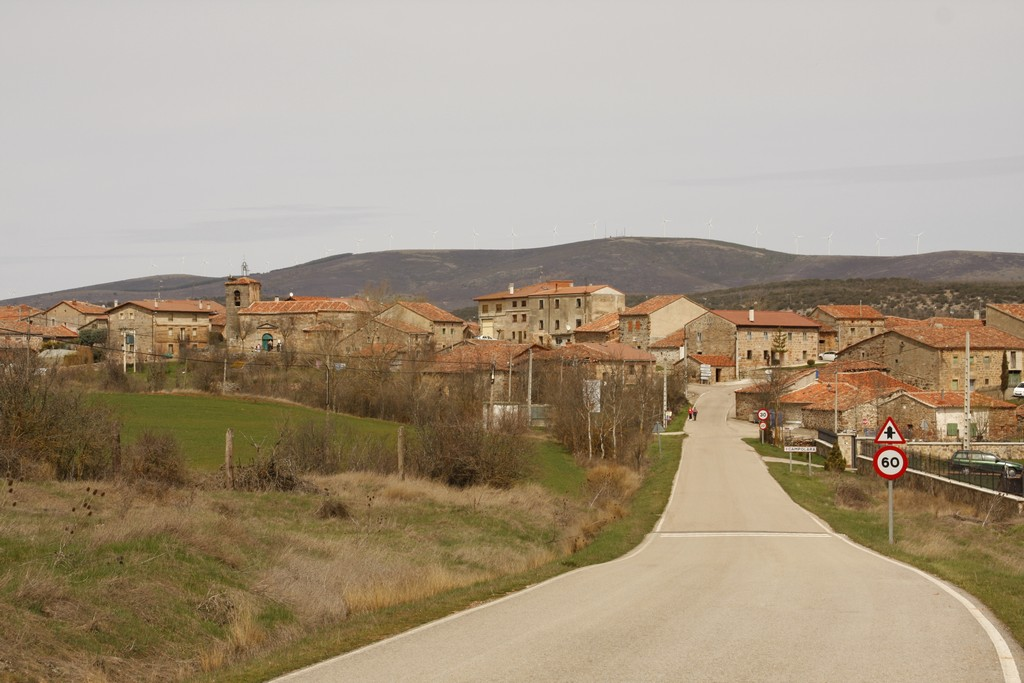
- View of Campolara, 2010
- Interactive map of Campolara
- Country: Spain
- Autonomous community: Castile and León
- Province: Burgos
- Comarca: Sierra de la Demanda

Area
  - Total: 13.24 km^{2} (5.11 sq mi)
- Elevation: 963 m (3,159 ft)

Population (2025-01-01)
  - Total: 46
  - Density: 3.5/km^{2} (9.0/sq mi)
- Time zone: UTC+1 (CET)
  - Summer (DST): UTC+2 (CEST)
- Postal code: 09650
- Website: http://www.campolara.es/

Campolara is a municipality located in the province of Burgos, Castile and León, Spain. According to the 2004 census (INE), the municipality had a population of 95 inhabitants.
