= Egypt at the 2018 Mediterranean Games =

- IOC code: EGY

in Tarragona, Spain
- Medals: Gold 18 Silver 11 Bronze 16 Total 45

Mediterranean Games appearances (overview)
- 1951; 1955; 1959–1967; 1971; 1975; 1979; 1983; 1987; 1991; 1993; 1997; 2001; 2005; 2009; 2013; 2018; 2022

Other related appearances
- United Arab Republic (1959, 1963)

Egypt competed at the 2018 Mediterranean Games in Tarragona, Spain from 22 June to 1 July 2018.

== Medals ==
Medals by sport
Sport	1st place, gold medalist(s)	2nd place, silver medalist(s)	3rd place, bronze medalist(s)	Total	Rank
Karate	0	2	3	5	9
Swimming	2	2	3	7	5

== Karate ==
Ahmed Elasfar won the silver medal in the men's kumite +84 kg event. Malek Salama won one of the bronze medals in the men's kumite 60 kg event and Ahmed Elmasry won one of the bronze medals in the men's kumite 84 kg event.

Areeg Rashed won one of the bronze medals in the women's kumite 50 kg event. Giana Lotfy won the silver medal in the women's kumite 61 kg event.

== Swimming ==
Athlete	Event	Heat		Final	
Athlete	Event	Time	Rank	Time	Rank
Abdelrahman Elaraby	50 m freestyle	22.99	10	did not advance	
Ali Khalafalla	50 m freestyle	22.05	1 Q	21.97 NR	3rd place, bronze medalist(s)
Ali Khalafalla	100 m freestyle	49.10 NR	3 Q	49.66	5
Omar Eltonbary	100 m freestyle	51.92	15	did not advance	
Omar Eltonbary	200 m freestyle	1:55.59	18	did not advance	
Marwan Elkamash	200 m freestyle	1:49.93	4 Q	1:48.12	3rd place, bronze medalist(s)
Marwan Elkamash	400 m freestyle	3:51.98	1 Q	3:47.51	3rd place, bronze medalist(s)
Abdelrahman Elaraby	50 m backstroke	27.81	19	did not advance	
Youssef Said	50 m backstroke	25.97	6 Q	26.07	=7
Youssef Said	100 m backstroke	55.74	3 Q	56.48	8
Youssef Said	200 m backstroke	2:05.61	11	did not advance	
Omar Eltonbary	200 m backstroke	2:11.17	18	did not advance	
Youssef Elkamash	50 m breaststroke	28.05	6 Q	28.30	8
Youssef Elkamash	100 m breaststroke	1:01.35	2 Q	1:01.64	5
Youssef Elkamash	200 m breaststroke	2:16.69	7 Q	2:17.57	7
Abdelrahman Elaraby	50 m butterfly	24.04	4 Q	23.69 NR	2nd place, silver medalist(s)
Ahmed Hussein	50 m butterfly	25.13	13	did not advance	
Mohamed Abdelbaky	100 m butterfly	56.70	13	did not advance	
Ahmed Hussein	100 m butterfly	54.83	10	did not advance	
Mohamed Abdelbaky	200 m butterfly	2:05.98	13	did not advance	
Ahmed Hussein	200 m butterfly	2:05.37	11	did not advance	
Omar Eltonary	200 m individual medley	2:12.54	17	did not advance	
Youssef Said; Youssef Elkamash; Marwan Elkamash; Ali Khalafalla	4 × 100 m medley relay	—N/a		3:42.40	5

Athlete	Event	Heat		Final	
Athlete	Event	Time	Rank	Time	Rank
Farida Osman	50 m freestyle	25.25	1 Q	24.83 GR	1st place, gold medalist(s)
Farida Osman	100 m freestyle	55.87	5 Q	Withdrew	
Farida Osman	50 m butterfly	25.86	1 Q	25.48 GR	1st place, gold medalist(s)
Farida Osman	100 m butterfly	1:00.10	6 Q	58.51	2nd place, silver medalist(s)
