= Polyneikis Kalamaras =

Greek boxer

Personal information
- Nationality: Greek
- Born: 20 October 1995 (age 30)
- Height: 1.87 m (6 ft 2 in)
- Weight: 81 kg (179 lb)

Sport
- Country: Greece
- Sport: Boxing
Medal record
Mediterranean Games
Bronze medal – third place	2018 Tarragona	Light heavyweight

Polyneikis Kalamaras is a Greek boxer. In 2018, he won a bronze medal at the 2018 Mediterranean Games.
