= Dimitrios Aslanidis =

Greek weightlifter (born 1992)

Personal information
- Nationality: Greek
- Born: 3 December 1992 (age 33)
- Height: 1.64 m (5 ft 5 in)
- Weight: 85 kg (187 lb)

Sport
- Country: Greece
- Sport: Weightlifting
Medal record
Mediterranean Games
Silver medal – second place	2018 Tarragona	−85 kg Snatch
Bronze medal – third place	2018 Tarragona	−85 kg Clean & Jerk

Dimitrios Aslanidis is a Greek weightlifter. He won one silver and one bronze medal for Greece, at the 2018 Mediterranean Games.
