= Stefanos Dimitriadis =

Greek swimmer (born 1989)

Medal record

Men's Swimming

Representing Greece

Mediterranean Games
| Gold medal – first place | 2018 Tarragona | 4x100 m medley |
| Silver medal – second place | 2013 Mersin | 200 m butterfly |
| Silver medal – second place | 2013 Mersin | 4x100 m medley |
| Bronze medal – third place | 2018 Tarragona | 200 m butterfly |

Stefanos Dimitriadis (born 8 September 1989, Athens) is a Greek swimmer. At the 2012 Summer Olympics, he competed in the Men's 100 metre butterfly and 200 m butterfly, finishing in 40th and 23rd places overall respectively in the heats, failing to qualify for the semifinals.

At the 2016 Summer Olympics in Rio de Janeiro, he competed in the men's 200 metre butterfly. He finished 18th in the heats with a time of 1:56.76 and did not qualify for the semifinals.
