= Spyridon Kalentzis =

Greek rower (born 1996)

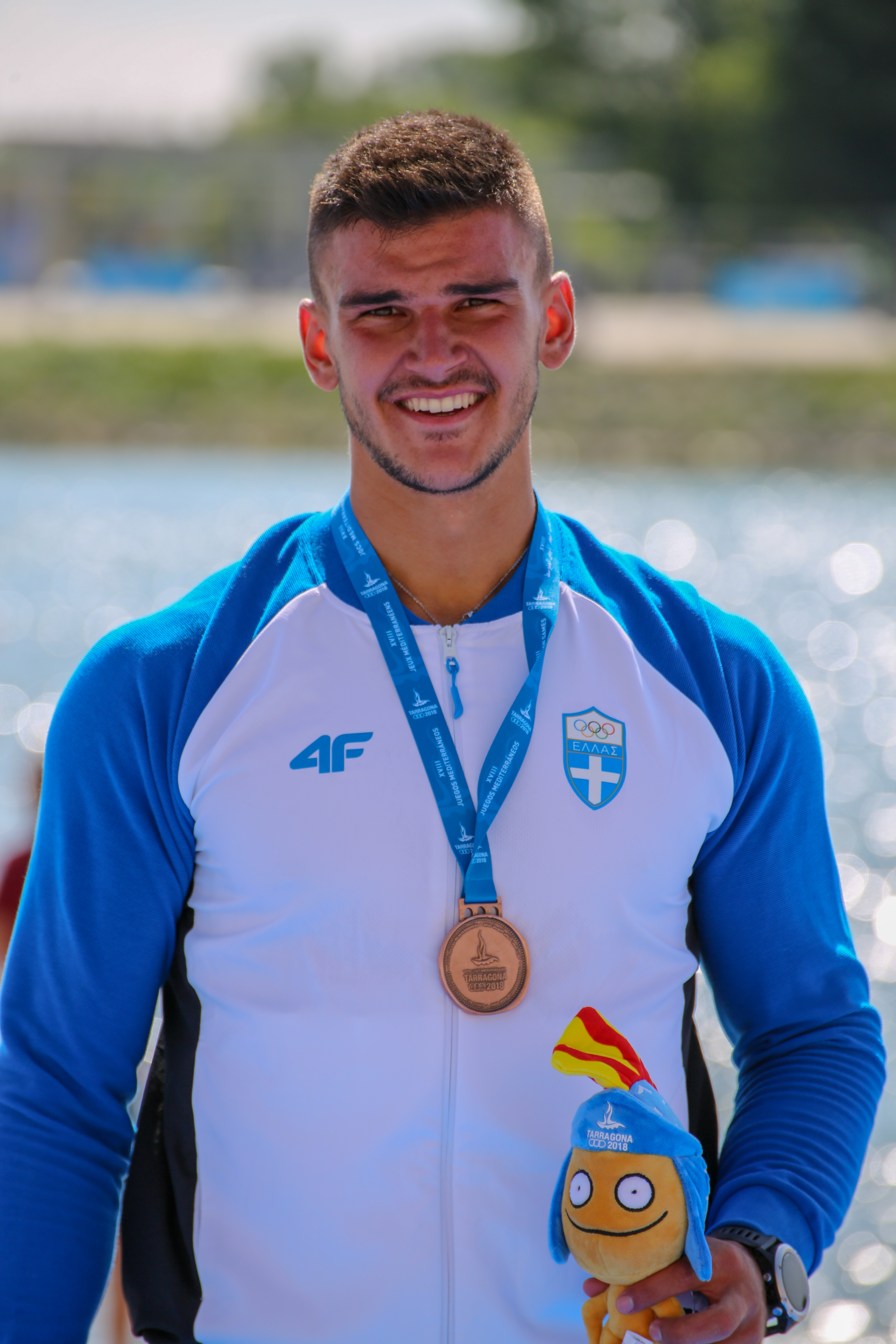

Personal information
- Nationality: Greek
- Born: 26 December 1996 (age 29)
- Height: 1.85 m (6 ft 1 in)
- Weight: 90 kg (198 lb)

Sport
- Country: Greece
- Sport: Rowing
Medal record
Mediterranean Games
Bronze medal – third place	2018 Tarragona	M1x

Spyridon Kalentzis is a Greek rower from Corfu. In 2018, he won a bronze medal for Greece, at the 2018 Mediterranean Games.
