= Berk Özkul =

Turkish swimmer (born 1998)

Personal information
- Nationality: Turkish
- Born: 30 June 1998 (age 28)

Sport
- Sport: Swimming

Berk Özkul (born 30 June 1998) is a Turkish swimmer. He competed in the men's 200 metre backstroke event at the 2018 FINA World Swimming Championships (25 m), in Hangzhou, China.
