= Slovenia at the 2018 Mediterranean Games =

- IOC code: SLO
- NOC: Olympic Committee of Slovenia

in Tarragona, Spain 22 June 2018 – 1 July 2018
- Medals Ranked 11th: Gold 4 Silver 9 Bronze 23 Total 36

Mediterranean Games appearances (overview)
- 1993; 1997; 2001; 2005; 2009; 2013; 2018; 2022

Other related appearances
- Yugoslavia (1951–1991)

Slovenia competed at the 2018 Mediterranean Games in Tarragona, Spain from 22 June to 1 July 2018.

== Medals ==
Medals by sport
Sport	1st place, gold medalist(s)	2nd place, silver medalist(s)	3rd place, bronze medalist(s)	Total	Rank
Karate	1	0	1	2	6
Swimming	0	0	3	3	10

== Karate ==
Tjaša Ristić won the gold medal in the women's kumite 61 kg event. Lina Pušnik won one of the bronze medals in the women's 68 kg event.

== Swimming ==
Men

Athlete	Event	Heat		Final	
Athlete	Event	Time	Rank	Time	Rank
Martin Bau	200 m freestyle	1:51.28	13	did not advance	
Martin Bau	400 m freestyle	3:55.05	8 Q	3:54.82	7
Anže Ferš Eržen	50 m backstroke	26.44	=10	did not advance	
Anže Ferš Eržen	100 m backstroke	57.07	9	did not advance	
Anže Ferš Eržen	200 m backstroke	2:04.60	9	did not advance	
Aljaž Kerč	50 m breaststroke	29.12	14	did not advance	
Peter John Stevens	50 m breaststroke	27.56	1 Q	27.32	3rd place, bronze medalist(s)
Aljaž Kerč	100 m breaststroke	1:02.61	13	did not advance	
Peter John Stevens	100 m breaststroke	1:02.05	7 Q	DSQ	
Aljaž Kerč	200 m breaststroke	2:16.52	6 Q	2:16.36	6
Gal Kordež	50 m butterfly	25.11	12	did not advance	
Gal Kordež	100 m butterfly	55.88	12	did not advance	
Anže Ferš Eržen	200 m individual medley	2:06.30	13	did not advance	

Women

Athlete	Event	Heat		Final	
Athlete	Event	Time	Rank	Time	Rank
Neža Klančar	50 m freestyle	25.97	10	did not advance	
Neža Klančar	100 m freestyle	55.86	4 Q	55.40	3rd place, bronze medalist(s)
Neža Klančar	200 m freestyle	2:02.44	4 Q	2:02.33	6
Katja Fain	200 m freestyle	2:03.19	9	did not advance	
Katja Fain	400 m freestyle	4:17.80	7 Q	4:17.42	7
Anja Klinar	400 m freestyle	4:18.78	8 Q	Withdrew	
Tjaša Oder	800 m freestyle	—		8:28.91	3rd place, bronze medalist(s)
Sara Račnik	800 m freestyle	—		8:50.00	8
Katja Fain	50 m backstroke	30.97	11	did not advance	
Tina Čelik	50 m breaststroke	32.21	8 Q	31.95	7
Tjaša Vozel	50 m breaststroke	33.01	10	did not advance	
Tina Čelik	100 m breaststroke	1:10.06	7 Q	1:10.41	7
Tjaša Vozel	100 m breaststroke	1:09.73	5 Q	1:09.72	6
Tina Čelik	200 m breaststroke	2:35.48	8 Q	2:37.43	8
Tjaša Vozel	200 m breaststroke	2:31.30	5 Q	2:29.88	7
Anja Klinar	100 m butterfly	1:01.10	11	did not advance	
Tara Vovk	100 m butterfly	1:01.02	10	did not advance	
Anja Klinar	200 m butterfly	2:11.54	3 Q	2:10.26	4
Tara Vovk	200 m individual medley	2:16.24	6 Q	2:17.49	7
Anja Klinar; Katja Fain; Neža Klančar; Sara Račnik	4 × 200 m freestyle relay	—		8:04.89	4
