= Geoffroy Mathieu =

French swimmer

Personal information
- Born: 1 June 1997 (age 29) Nancy, France

Sport
- Sport: Swimming

Geoffroy Mathieu (born 1 June 1997) is a French swimmer. He competed in the men's 100 metre backstroke event at the 2017 World Aquatics Championships.
