= Ioannis Karpouzlis =

Greek swimmer (born 1992)

Personal information
- Nationality: Greek
- Born: 1 March 1992 (age 34)

Sport
- Sport: Swimming
Medal record
Mediterranean Games
Silver medal – second place	2018 Tarragona	4×100 m freestyle

Ioannis Karpouzlis (born 1 March 1992) is a Greek swimmer. He competed in the men's 50 metre breaststroke event at the 2017 World Aquatics Championships.
