= Ahmed Hussein (swimmer) =

Egyptian swimmer (born 1983)

Personal information
- Full name: Ahmed Moustafa Hussein
- National team: Egypt
- Born: 25 May 1983 (age 43) Cairo, Egypt
- Height: 185 cm (6 ft 1 in)
- Weight: 82 kg (181 lb)

Sport
- Sport: Swimming
- Strokes: Backstroke
- Club: Heliolido Sporting Club
- College team: Arizona State University (U.S.)
- Coach: Mike Chasson (U.S.)
Medal record
Men's swimming
Representing Egypt
Mediterranean Games
Silver medal – second place	2005 Almería	100 m backstroke
Bronze medal – third place	2005 Almería	50 m backstroke
Bronze medal – third place	2005 Almería	200 m backstroke
All-Africa Games
Gold medal – first place	2003 Abuja	50 m backstroke
Gold medal – first place	2003 Abuja	100 m backstroke
Gold medal – first place	2003 Abuja	200 m backstroke

Ahmed Moustafa Hussein (Arabic: أحمد مصطفى حسين; born 25 May 1983) is an Egyptian former swimmer who specialized in backstroke events. He is a two-time Olympian, and a three-time All-American swimmer for the Arizona State Sun Devils at Arizona State University in Tempe, Arizona, where he majored in and graduated with a bachelor's degree in civil engineering.

Hussein made his first Egyptian team at the 2000 Summer Olympics in Sydney, where he competed in the men's 200 m backstroke. Swimming in heat two, he edged out Singapore's Gary Tan to earn a fifth spot and thirty-sixth overall by 0.22 of a second in 2:06.10.

At the 2004 Summer Olympics in Athens, Hussein extended his program by qualifying for two swimming events. He claimed two gold medals from the All-Africa Games in Abuja, Nigeria, breaking an Egyptian record and meeting a FINA B-cut of 55.75 (100 m backstroke) and 2:02.45 (200 m backstroke).

In the 100 m backstroke, Hussein participated in heat three against seven other swimmers, including Olympic veteran Derya Büyükuncu of Turkey. He raced to sixth place and thirty-first overall by 0.52 of a second behind Buyukuncu, outside his personal best of 56.86. In his second event, 200 m backstroke, Hussein matched his position from the 100-metre backstroke on the morning's preliminaries. Hussein saved a seventh spot on the same heat as Sydney over South Korea's Sung Min, who finished behind him in last place by 0.04 of a second, with a time of 2:04.82.

At the 2005 Mediterranean Games in Almería, Spain, Hussein won a total of three medals in the same discipline, a silver in the 100 (56.06) and a bronze in the 50 m backstroke (25.86). In the 200 m backstroke, he lowered his own Egyptian record of 2:01.61 to claim another bronze.
