= 2026 Antalya Challenger 4 =

- Date: 7 – 13 September
- Edition: 8th
- Category: WTA 125
- Draw: 32S/16D
- Surface: Clay
- Location: Antalya, Turkey

Champions

Singles
- (Bulgaria) Rositsa Dencheva

Doubles
- (Czech Republic) Aneta Kučmová / (Czech Republic) Aneta Laboutková
- Antalya Challenger

The 2026 Antalya Open (also known as the ATİK Antalya Open for sponsorship reasons) was a professional women's tennis tournament played on outdoor clay courts. It was the eighth edition of the tournament and the fourth in a series of four WTA 125 tournaments played in Antalya in 2026, with the first three taking place in consecutive weeks in February and March. It took place at the Antalya Tenis İhtisas Spor Kulübü (ATİK) in Antalya, Turkey between 7 and 13 September 2026.

== Singles main-draw entrants ==
=== Seeds ===
Country	Player	Rank^{1}	Seed
GBR	Francesca Jones	104	1
POL	Katarzyna Kawa	129	2
ITA	Lucia Bronzetti	135	3
ESP	Leyre Romero Gormaz	145	4
BUL	Elizara Yaneva	166	5
	Elena Pridankina	186	6
SRB	Mia Ristić	195	7
NED	Eva Vedder	197	8

- ^{1} Rankings as of 31 August 2026.

=== Other entrants ===
The following player received a wildcard into the singles main draw:

- (Turkey) Çağla Büyükakçay

The following players received entry from the qualifying draw:

- (Bulgaria) Rositsa Dencheva
- (Italy) Samira De Stefano
- (Turkey) İpek Öz
- (Germany) Nastasja Schunk

=== Withdrawals ===
Before the tournament

- (Georgia (country)) Ekaterine Gorgodze → replaced by (Kazakhstan) Zhibek Kulambayeva
- (Slovenia) Polona Hercog → replaced by (Spain) Alicia Herrero Liñana
- (Netherlands) Arantxa Rus → replaced by (Slovakia) Radka Zelníčková

== Doubles main-draw entrants ==
=== Seeds ===
Country	Player	Country	Player	Rank^{1}	Seed
POL	Weronika Falkowska	SLO	Dalila Jakupović	194	1
	Sofya Lansere		Elena Pridankina	220	2
IND	Rutuja Bhosale	KAZ	Zhibek Kulambayeva	226	3
CZE	Aneta Kučmová	CZE	Aneta Laboutková	284	4

- ^{1} Rankings as of 31 August 2026.

=== Other entrants ===
The following pairs received wildcards into the doubles main draw:

- (Turkey) Berfu Cengiz / (Turkey) İpek Öz

== Champions ==
=== Singles ===
- (Bulgaria) Rositsa Dencheva def. Alevtina Ibragimova, 7–5, 6–4

=== Doubles ===
- (Czech Republic) Aneta Kučmová / (Czech Republic) Aneta Laboutková def. Alevtina Ibragimova / Ksenia Zaytseva 4–6, 6–2, [10–6]
