= 2021 Antalya Challenger IV – Doubles =

Doubles
- 2021 Antalya Challenger IV

Final
- Champions: (Chinese Taipei) Hsu Yu-hsiou (Ukraine) Oleksii Krutykh
- Runners-up: (Uzbekistan) Sanjar Fayziev (Greece) Markos Kalovelonis
- Score: 6–1, 7–6^{(7–5)}

Events
Singles	Doubles
- Antalya Challenger

Riccardo Bonadio and Giovanni Fonio were the defending champions but withdrew from the tournament before their quarterfinal match.

Hsu Yu-hsiou and Oleksii Krutykh won the title after defeating Sanjar Fayziev and Markos Kalovelonis 6–1, 7–6^{(7–5)} in the final.

== Seeds ==
1. (Switzerland) Jakub Paul / (Netherlands) Bart Stevens (semifinals)
2. (Chinese Taipei) Hsu Yu-hsiou / (Ukraine) Oleksii Krutykh (champions)
3. (Uzbekistan) Sanjar Fayziev / (Greece) Markos Kalovelonis (final)
4. (Kazakhstan) Grigoriy Lomakin / (Ukraine) Oleg Prihodko (quarterfinals)

== Draw ==
Key

- Q = Qualifier
- WC = Wild card
- LL = Lucky loser
- Alt = Alternate
- ITF = ITF entry
- PR = Protected ranking
- SR = Special ranking
- SE = Special exempt
- JE = Junior exempt
- JR = Junior Accelerator Programme entrant
- CO = College Accelerator Programme entrant
- NG = Next Gen Accelerator Program entrant
- w/o = Walkover
- r = Retired
- d = Defaulted

First round
(Netherlands) M Veldheer (Switzerland) D Wenger	7	4	[12]
WC	(Turkey) S Ağabigün (Turkey) T Altuna	5	6	[10]
3	(Uzbekistan) S Fayziev (Greece) M Kalovelonis	7^{7}	6
(Russia) Andrey Chepelev (Russia) E Tiurnev	6^{4}	4
(Italy) R Bonadio (Italy) G Fonio	w/o
(Croatia) D Ajduković (Serbia) M Zekić
(Romania) C Crețu (Romania) A Jecan	6	6
WC	(Turkey) U Akkoyun (Turkey) M İlhan	2	3
(Japan) T Matsui (Japan) K Uesugi	6	1	[8]
4	(Kazakhstan) G Lomakin (Ukraine) O Prihodko	3	6	[10]
(Ukraine) V Orlov (Uzbekistan) K Sultanov
(Bulgaria) P Milushev (Bulgaria) R Shandarov	w/o

Quarterfinals
1	(Switzerland) J Paul (Netherlands) B Stevens	6	6
(Netherlands) M Veldheer (Switzerland) D Wenger	3	2
3	(Uzbekistan) S Fayziev (Greece) M Kalovelonis	w/o
(Italy) R Bonadio (Italy) G Fonio
(Romania) C Crețu (Romania) A Jecan	7^{7}	4	[10]
4	(Kazakhstan) G Lomakin (Ukraine) O Prihodko	6^{3}	6	[8]
(Bulgaria) P Milushev (Bulgaria) R Shandarov	1	3
2	(Chinese Taipei) Y-h Hsu (Ukraine) O Krutykh	6	6

Semifinals
1	(Switzerland) J Paul (Netherlands) B Stevens	3	6^{5}
3	(Uzbekistan) S Fayziev (Greece) M Kalovelonis	6	7^{7}
(Romania) C Crețu (Romania) A Jecan	7^{7}	6^{4}	[7]
2	(Chinese Taipei) Y-h Hsu (Ukraine) O Krutykh	6^{3}	7^{7}	[10]

Final
3	(Uzbekistan) S Fayziev (Greece) M Kalovelonis	1	6^{5}
2	(Chinese Taipei) Y-h Hsu (Ukraine) O Krutykh	6	7^{7}
