= 2021 Antalya Challenger II – Singles =

Singles
- 2021 Antalya Challenger II

Final
- Champion: (Spain) Carlos Taberner
- Runner-up: (Spain) Jaume Munar
- Score: 6–4, 6–1

Events
Singles	Doubles
← 2021 ·	Antalya Challenger	· 2021 →

Jaume Munar was the defending champion but lost in the final to Carlos Taberner 4–6, 1–6.

This was the second edition of the tournament and second of two editions of the tournament to start the 2021 ATP Challenger Tour year.

== Seeds ==
1. (Portugal) João Sousa (first round)
2. (Spain) Jaume Munar (final)
3. (Colombia) Daniel Elahi Galán (second round)
4. (Brazil) Thiago Seyboth Wild (second round)
5. (Slovakia) Jozef Kovalík (quarterfinals)
6. (Argentina) Facundo Bagnis (quarterfinals)
7. (Italy) Lorenzo Musetti (first round)
8. (Germany) Daniel Altmaier (first round)

== Draw ==
=== Key ===
- Q = Qualifier
- WC = Wild card
- LL = Lucky loser
- Alt = Alternate
- SE = Special exempt
- PR = Protected ranking
- ITF = ITF entry
- JE = Junior exempt
- w/o = Walkover
- r = Retired
- d = Defaulted
- SR = Special ranking

=== Finals ===
Semifinals
(Spain) Carlos Taberner	7	6
Q	(Argentina) Tomás Martín Etcheverry	5	2
(Italy) Alessandro Giannessi	0	0^{r}
2	(Spain) Jaume Munar	6	2

Final
(Spain) Carlos Taberner	6	6
2	(Spain) Jaume Munar	4	1

=== Top half ===
First round
1	(Portugal) J Sousa	1	4
(Spain) C Taberner	6	6
Q	(Croatia) D Ajduković	6	2	4
(Ecuador) E Gómez	3	6	6
Q	(Argentina) F Mena	6^{4}	3
(Kazakhstan) D Popko	7^{7}	6
WC	(Turkey) M İlhan	3	4
6	(Argentina) F Bagnis	6	6
4	(Brazil) T Seyboth Wild	6	6
(Italy) L Giustino	4	3
(Brazil) J Menezes	6	1	2
Q	(Argentina) TM Etcheverry	2	6	6
(Italy) P Lorenzi	7	4	2
Q	(Australia) A Santillan	5	6	6
(Argentina) L Mayer	6	6
7	(Italy) L Musetti	4	3

Second round
(Spain) C Taberner	6	6^{5}	6
(Ecuador) E Gómez	0	7^{7}	1
(Kazakhstan) D Popko	1	2
6	(Argentina) F Bagnis	6	6
4	(Brazil) T Seyboth Wild	2	6	4
Q	(Argentina) TM Etcheverry	6	3	6
Q	(Australia) A Santillan	6^{4}	2
(Argentina) L Mayer	7^{7}	6

Quarterfinals
(Spain) C Taberner	6	7^{7}
6	(Argentina) F Bagnis	3	6^{0}
Q	(Argentina) TM Etcheverry	6	6
(Argentina) L Mayer	3	4

Semifinals
(Spain) C Taberner	7	6
Q	(Argentina) TM Etcheverry	5	2

=== Bottom half ===
First round
8	(Germany) D Altmaier	6^{2}	2
(Italy) A Giannessi	7^{7}	6
(Portugal) J Domingues	1	4
(Egypt) M Safwat	6	6
(Chile) A Tabilo	7^{8}	6
WC	(Turkey) S Ağabigün	6^{6}	1
SE	(Spain) T Robredo	2	7	0
3	(Colombia) DE Galán	6	5	6
5	(Slovakia) J Kovalík	6	6
SE	(Turkey) C İlkel	3	1
(Netherlands) T Griekspoor	6	6
Alt	(United States) E Escobedo	3	2
LL	(Italy) GM Moroni	6	4	6^{6}
(India) R Ramanathan	4	6	7^{8}
WC	(Turkey) E Kırkın	3	3
2	(Spain) J Munar	6	6

Second round
(Italy) A Giannessi	6	6
(Egypt) M Safwat	3	4
(Chile) A Tabilo	2	6	6
3	(Colombia) DE Galán	6	4	4
5	(Slovakia) J Kovalík	6	6
(Netherlands) T Griekspoor	1	2
(India) R Ramanathan	4	5
2	(Spain) J Munar	6	7

Quarterfinals
(Italy) A Giannessi	5	7	6
(Chile) A Tabilo	7	5	1
5	(Slovakia) J Kovalík	5	7^{7}	1
2	(Spain) J Munar	7	6^{3}	6

Semifinals
(Italy) A Giannessi	0	0^{r}
2	(Spain) J Munar	6	2
