= 2021 Antalya Challenger IV – Singles =

Singles
- 2021 Antalya Challenger IV

Final
- Champion: (Russia) Evgenii Tiurnev
- Runner-up: (Ukraine) Oleg Prihodko
- Score: 3–6, 6–4, 6–4

Events
| Singles | Doubles |
- Antalya Challenger

Nuno Borges was the defending champion but chose not to defend his title.

Evgenii Tiurnev won the title after defeating Oleg Prihodko 3–6, 6–4, 6–4 in the final.

== Seeds ==
1. (Turkey) Cem İlkel (quarterfinals)
2. (India) Ramkumar Ramanathan (withdrew)
3. (Croatia) Duje Ajduković (quarterfinals)
4. (United Kingdom) Ryan Peniston (second round)
5. (Italy) Riccardo Bonadio (first round)
6. (Spain) Javier Barranco Cosano (second round)
7. (Bosnia and Herzegovina) Nerman Fatić (semifinals, retired)
8. (Serbia) Miljan Zekić (withdrew)
9. (Russia) Evgenii Tiurnev (champion)

== Draw ==
Key

- Q = Qualifier
- WC = Wild card
- LL = Lucky loser
- Alt = Alternate
- ITF = ITF entry
- PR = Protected ranking
- SR = Special ranking
- SE = Special exempt
- JE = Junior exempt
- JR = Junior Accelerator Programme entrant
- CO = College Accelerator Programme entrant
- NG = Next Gen Accelerator Program entrant
- w/o = Walkover
- r = Retired
- d = Defaulted

=== Finals ===
Semifinals
LL | (Ukraine) Oleg Prihodko | 1 | 6 | 6
(Italy) Giovanni Fonio | 6 | 1 | 3
7 | (Bosnia and Herzegovina) Nerman Fatić | 2 | 7 | 1^{r}
9 | (Russia) Evgenii Tiurnev | 6 | 5 | 4

Final
LL | (Ukraine) Oleg Prihodko | 6 | 4 | 4
9 | (Russia) Evgenii Tiurnev | 3 | 6 | 6

=== Top half ===
First round
1/WC | (Turkey) C İlkel | 6 | 7
(Russia) I Nedelko | 4 | 5
WC | (Turkey) S Ağabigün | 0 | 5
(Romania) FC Jianu | 6 | 7
(South Korea) D-h Lee | 6 | 6
(Hungary) F Marozsán | 4 | 1
LL | (Ukraine) O Prihodko | 7^{17} | 6
5 | (Italy) R Bonadio | 6^{15} | 4
4 | (United Kingdom) R Peniston | 7^{7} | 7^{7}
(Chinese Taipei) Y-h Hsu | 6^{0} | 6^{0}
LL | (Switzerland) J Paul | 1 | 0
(Italy) G Fonio | 6 | 6
(Dominican Republic) N Hardt | 7 | 6
(Ukraine) O Krutykh | 5 | 3
(Austria) F Misolic | 3 | 3
6 | (Spain) J Barranco Cosano | 6 | 6

Second round
1/WC | (Turkey) C İlkel | 6^{3} | 6 | 6
(Romania) FC Jianu | 7^{7} | 4 | 0
(South Korea) D-h Lee | 3 | 3
LL | (Ukraine) O Prihodko | 6 | 6
4 | (United Kingdom) R Peniston | 6 | 4 | 4
(Italy) G Fonio | 1 | 6 | 6
(Dominican Republic) N Hardt | 5 | 6 | 6
6 | (Spain) J Barranco Cosano | 7 | 0 | 2

Quarterfinals
1/WC | (Turkey) C İlkel | 3 | 6 | 2
LL | (Ukraine) O Prihodko | 6 | 3 | 6
(Italy) G Fonio | 7^{7} | 6
(Dominican Republic) N Hardt | 6^{0} | 2

Semifinals
LL | (Ukraine) O Prihodko | 1 | 6 | 6
(Italy) G Fonio | 6 | 1 | 3

=== Bottom half ===
First round
7 | (Bosnia and Herzegovina) N Fatić | 2 | 6 | 6
(Spain) P Martín Tiffon | 6 | 0 | 0
(Ukraine) G Kravchenko | 4 | 1
(Ukraine) V Orlov | 6 | 6
(Uzbekistan) K Sultanov | 3 | 3
Q | (Romania) C Crețu | 6 | 6
(Israel) Y Oliel | 4 | 6 | 4
3 | (Croatia) D Ajduković | 6 | 1 | 6
LL | (Kazakhstan) G Lomakin | 5 | 4
Q | (Russia) Andrey Chepelev | 7 | 6
(Bulgaria) A Lazarov | 6 | 6
Q | (Turkey) M İlhan | 3 | 3
WC | (Romania) A Jecan | 6 | 7^{7}
(United States) N Chappell | 2 | 6^{2}
Q | (Switzerland) D Wenger | 2 | 3
9 | (Russia) E Tiurnev | 6 | 6

Second round
7 | (Bosnia and Herzegovina) N Fatić | w/o
(Ukraine) V Orlov
Q | (Romania) C Crețu | 6 | 4 | 4
3 | (Croatia) D Ajduković | 4 | 6 | 6
Q | (Russia) A Chepelev | 2 | 0
(Bulgaria) A Lazarov | 6 | 6
WC | (Romania) A Jecan | 3 | 6 | 3
9 | (Russia) E Tiurnev | 6 | 4 | 6

Quarterfinals
7 | (Bosnia and Herzegovina) N Fatić | 6 | 7
3 | (Croatia) D Ajduković | 4 | 5
(Bulgaria) A Lazarov | 4 | 7^{7} | 1
9 | (Russia) E Tiurnev | 6 | 6^{5} | 6

Semifinals
7 | (Bosnia and Herzegovina) N Fatić | 2 | 7 | 1^{r}
9 | (Russia) E Tiurnev | 6 | 5 | 4
