= 2021 Antalya Challenger IV =

- Date: 6–12 December
- Edition: 4th
- Surface: Clay
- Location: Antalya, Turkey

Champions

Singles
- (Russia) Evgenii Tiurnev

Doubles
- (Chinese Taipei) Hsu Yu-hsiou / (Ukraine) Oleksii Krutykh
← 2021 ·	Antalya Challenger	· 2023 →

The 2021 Antalya Challenger IV was a professional tennis tournament played on clay courts. It was the fourth edition of the tournament which was part of the 2021 ATP Challenger Tour. It took place in Antalya, Turkey between 6 and 12 December 2021.

== Singles main-draw entrants ==
=== Seeds ===
Country	Player	Rank^{1}	Seed
TUR	Cem İlkel	144	1
~~IND~~	~~Ramkumar Ramanathan~~	~~186~~	~~2~~
CRO	Duje Ajduković	251	3
GBR	Ryan Peniston	284	4
ITA	Riccardo Bonadio	298	5
ESP	Javier Barranco Cosano	305	6
BIH	Nerman Fatić	307	7
~~SRB~~	~~Miljan Zekić~~	~~308~~	~~8~~
RUS	Evgenii Tiurnev	319	9

- ^{1} Rankings as of 29 November 2021.

=== Other entrants ===
The following players received wildcards into the singles main draw:

- (Turkey) Sarp Ağabigün
- (Turkey) Cem İlkel
- (Romania) Alexandru Jecan

The following players received entry from the qualifying draw:

- (Russia) Andrey Chepelev
- (Romania) Cezar Crețu
- (Turkey) Marsel İlhan
- (Switzerland) Damien Wenger

The following players received entry as lucky losers:

- (Kazakhstan) Grigoriy Lomakin
- (Switzerland) Jakub Paul
- (Ukraine) Oleg Prihodko

== Champions ==
=== Singles ===
- (Russia) Evgenii Tiurnev def. (Ukraine) Oleg Prihodko 3–6, 6–4, 6–4.

=== Doubles ===
- (Chinese Taipei) Hsu Yu-hsiou / (Ukraine) Oleksii Krutykh def. (Uzbekistan) Sanjar Fayziev / (Greece) Markos Kalovelonis 6–1, 7–6^{(7–5)}.
