= 2021 Antalya Challenger III – Doubles =

Doubles
- 2021 Antalya Challenger III

Final
- Champions: (Italy) Riccardo Bonadio (Italy) Giovanni Fonio
- Runners-up: (Chinese Taipei) Hsu Yu-hsiou (Chinese Taipei) Tseng Chun-hsin
- Score: 3–6, 6–2, [12–10]

Events
Singles	Doubles
- Antalya Challenger

Denys Molchanov and Aleksandr Nedovyesov were the defending champions but chose not to defend their title.

Riccardo Bonadio and Giovanni Fonio won the title after defeating Hsu Yu-hsiou and Tseng Chun-hsin 3–6, 6–2, [12–10] in the final.

== Seeds ==
1. (Portugal) Gonçalo Oliveira / (Netherlands) Bart Stevens (first round)
2. (Portugal) Francisco Cabral / (Tunisia) Aziz Dougaz (first round)
3. (Spain) Javier Barranco Cosano / (Spain) Oriol Roca Batalla (semifinals, withdrew)
4. (Ukraine) Vladyslav Orlov / (India) Ramkumar Ramanathan (semifinals)

== Draw ==
Key

- Q = Qualifier
- WC = Wild card
- LL = Lucky loser
- Alt = Alternate
- ITF = ITF entry
- PR = Protected ranking
- SR = Special ranking
- SE = Special exempt
- JE = Junior exempt
- JR = Junior Accelerator Programme entrant
- CO = College Accelerator Programme entrant
- NG = Next Gen Accelerator Program entrant
- w/o = Walkover
- r = Retired
- d = Defaulted

First round
1	(Portugal) G Oliveira (Netherlands) B Stevens	3	2
(Italy) R Bonadio (Italy) G Fonio	6	6
(Croatia) D Ajduković (South Korea) D-h Lee	2	2
(Spain) Eduard Esteve Lobato (Bosnia and Herzegovina) N Fatić	6	6
4	(Ukraine) V Orlov (India) R Ramanathan	6	6
(Romania) FC Jianu (Spain) N Sánchez Izqueirdo	4	4
WC	(Germany) Lucas Gerch (Georgia (country)) A Metreveli	6	1	[10]
WC	(Turkey) M İlhan (Turkey) E Kırkın	3	6	[6]
(Ukraine) O Krutykh (Czech Republic) D Svrčina
(Greece) M Kalovelonis (Spain) P Martín Tiffon	w/o
WC	(Turkey) S Ağabigün (Turkey) Y Erel	3	6	[5]
3	(Spain) J Barranco Cosano (Spain) O Roca Batalla	6	3	[10]
(Turkey) T Altuna (Turkey) C İlkel	2	0
(Chinese Taipei) Y-h Hsu (Chinese Taipei) C-h Tseng	6	6
(Switzerland) J Paul (Uzbekistan) K Sultanov	7^{7}	6
2	(Portugal) F Cabral (Tunisia) A Dougaz	6^{5}	4

Quarterfinals
(Italy) R Bonadio (Italy) G Fonio	6	6
(Spain) E Esteve Lobato (Bosnia and Herzegovina) N Fatić	2	3
4	(Ukraine) V Orlov (India) R Ramanathan	6	7
WC	(Germany) L Gerch (Georgia (country)) A Metreveli	2	5
(Greece) M Kalovelonis (Spain) P Martín Tiffon	6^{6}	4
3	(Spain) J Barranco Cosano (Spain) O Roca Batalla	7^{8}	6
(Chinese Taipei) Y-h Hsu (Chinese Taipei) C-h Tseng	6	3	[11]
(Switzerland) J Paul (Uzbekistan) K Sultanov	1	6	[9]

Semifinals
(Italy) R Bonadio (Italy) G Fonio	7^{7}	6
4	(Ukraine) V Orlov (India) R Ramanathan	6^{4}	4
3	(Spain) J Barranco Cosano (Spain) O Roca Batalla
(Chinese Taipei) Y-h Hsu (Chinese Taipei) C-h Tseng	w/o

Final
(Italy) R Bonadio (Italy) G Fonio	3	6	[12]
(Chinese Taipei) Y-h Hsu (Chinese Taipei) C-h Tseng	6	2	[10]
