= 2021 Antalya Challenger II – Doubles =

Doubles
- 2021 Antalya Challenger II

Final
- Champions: (Ukraine) Denys Molchanov (Kazakhstan) Aleksandr Nedovyesov
- Runners-up: (United States) Robert Galloway (United States) Alex Lawson
- Score: 6–4, 7–6^{(7–2)}

Events
Singles	Doubles
← 2021 ·	Antalya Challenger	· 2021 →

Denys Molchanov and Aleksandr Nedovyesov were the defending champions and successfully defended their title, defeating Robert Galloway and Alex Lawson 6–4, 7–6^{(7–2)} in the final.

This was the second edition of the tournament and second of two editions of the tournament to start the 2021 ATP Challenger Tour year.

== Seeds ==
1. (India) Purav Raja / (India) Ramkumar Ramanathan (first round)
2. (Finland) Harri Heliövaara / (Czech Republic) Zdeněk Kolář (quarterfinals)
3. (Ukraine) Denys Molchanov / (Kazakhstan) Aleksandr Nedovyesov (champions)
4. (United States) Robert Galloway / (United States) Alex Lawson (final)

== Draw ==
=== Key ===
- Q = Qualifier
- WC = Wild card
- LL = Lucky loser
- Alt = Alternate
- SE = Special exempt
- PR = Protected ranking
- ITF = ITF entry
- JE = Junior exempt
- w/o = Walkover
- r = Retired
- d = Defaulted
- SR = Special ranking

First round
1	(India) P Raja (India) R Ramanathan	3	4
(Brazil) R Matos (Brazil) F Meligeni Alves	6	6
WC	(Turkey) S Ağabigün (Turkey) E Kırkın	3	6	[7]
WC	(Turkey) Y Erel (Turkey) M İlhan	6	1	[10]
3	(Ukraine) D Molchanov (Kazakhstan) A Nedovyesov	7^{7}	6
(Spain) C Taberner (Spain) D Vega Hernández	6^{1}	2
(United States) E King (United States) N Pasha	w/o
(Italy) P Lorenzi (Italy) GM Moroni
(Switzerland) L Margaroli (Romania) F Mergea	6^{5}	2
4	(United States) R Galloway (United States) A Lawson	7^{7}	6
(Philippines) T Huey (Netherlands) S Verbeek	6	7^{10}
(Portugal) J Domingues (Portugal) J Sousa	3	6^{8}
WC	(Croatia) D Ajduković (Turkey) T Altuna	1	1
2	(Finland) H Heliövaara (Czech Republic) Z Kolář	6	6

Quarterfinals
(Brazil) R Matos (Brazil) F Meligeni Alves	6	6
WC	(Turkey) Y Erel (Turkey) M İlhan	2	2
3	(Ukraine) D Molchanov (Kazakhstan) A Nedovyesov	7	6
(Germany) D Altmaier (Venezuela) LD Martínez	5	3
(United States) E King (United States) N Pasha	6	3	[4]
4	(United States) R Galloway (United States) A Lawson	3	6	[10]
(Philippines) T Huey (Netherlands) S Verbeek	7^{7}	4	[10]
2	(Finland) H Heliövaara (Czech Republic) Z Kolář	6^{3}	6	[7]

Semifinals
(Brazil) R Matos (Brazil) F Meligeni Alves	6	5	[8]
3	(Ukraine) D Molchanov (Kazakhstan) A Nedovyesov	3	7	[10]
4	(United States) R Galloway (United States) A Lawson	6	6^{14}	[10]
(Philippines) T Huey (Netherlands) S Verbeek	2	7^{16}	[5]

Final
3	(Ukraine) D Molchanov (Kazakhstan) A Nedovyesov	6	7^{7}
4	(United States) R Galloway (United States) A Lawson	4	6^{2}
