= 2026 Antalya Challenger 4 – Doubles =

Doubles
- 2026 Antalya Challenger 4

Final
- Champions: (Czech Republic) Aneta Kučmová (Czech Republic) Aneta Laboutková
- Runners-up: Alevtina Ibragimova; Ksenia Zaytseva
- Score: 4–6, 6–2, [10–6]

Events
Singles	Doubles
- Antalya Challenger

Maria Kozyreva and Iryna Shymanovich were the reigning champions, but chose not to participate.

Aneta Kučmová and Aneta Laboutková won the title, defeating Alevtina Ibragimova and Ksenia Zaytseva 4–6, 6–2, [10–6] in the final.

== Seeds ==
1. (Poland) Weronika Falkowska / (Slovenia) Dalila Jakupović (quarterfinals)
2. Sofya Lansere / Elena Pridankina (quarterfinals)
3. (India) Rutuja Bhosale / (Kazakhstan) Zhibek Kulambayeva (semifinals)
4. (Czech Republic) Aneta Kučmová / (Czech Republic) Aneta Laboutková (champions)

== Draw ==
Key

- Q = Qualifier
- WC = Wild card
- LL = Lucky loser
- Alt = Alternate
- ITF = ITF entry
- PR = Protected ranking
- SR = Special ranking
- SE = Special exempt
- JE = Junior exempt
- JR = Junior Accelerator Programme entrant
- CO = College Accelerator Programme entrant
- NG = Next Gen Accelerator Program entrant
- w/o = Walkover
- r = Retired
- d = Defaulted

=== Draw ===
First round
1	(Poland) W Falkowska (Slovenia) D Jakupović	6	7^{7}
(Egypt) S Samir (Slovakia) R Zelnícková	0	6^{2}
(Romania) O Gavrilă (Hungary) A Nagy	4	2
WC	(Turkey) B Cengiz (Turkey) İ Öz	6	6
4	(Czech Republic) A Kučmová (Czech Republic) A Laboutková	7^{7}	6
(Morocco) Y Kabbaj (Italy) M Tona	6^{3}	2
(Italy) F Urgesi (Italy) A Zantedeschi	6^{6}	3
(Bulgaria) R Dencheva (Croatia) M Dražić	7^{8}	6
(Italy) L Bronzetti (Italy) S De Stefano	2	4
(Spain) I Burillo (Spain) L Romero Gormaz	6	6
(Poland) G Feistel (Cyprus) R Șerban	2	2
3	(India) R Bhosale (Kazakhstan) Z Kulambayeva	6	6
(Japan) M Ayukawa (United Kingdom) E Webley-Smith	4	3
A Ibragimova; K Zaytseva	6	6
(Argentina) ML Carlé (Spain) A Herrero Liñana	3	2
2	S Lansere; E Pridankina	6	6

Quarterfinals
1	(Poland) W Falkowska (Slovenia) D Jakupović	4	1
WC	(Turkey) B Cengiz (Turkey) İ Öz	6	6
4	(Czech Republic) A Kučmová (Czech Republic) A Laboutková	6	6
(Bulgaria) R Dencheva (Croatia) M Dražić	0	3
(Spain) I Burillo (Spain) L Romero Gormaz	0	4
3	(India) R Bhosale (Kazakhstan) Z Kulambayeva	6	6
A Ibragimova; K Zaytseva	6	6
2	S Lansere; E Pridankina	4	3

Semifinals
WC	(Turkey) B Cengiz (Turkey) İ Öz	6^{5}	6	[7]
4	(Czech Republic) A Kučmová (Czech Republic) A Laboutková	7^{7}	4	[10]
3	(India) R Bhosale (Kazakhstan) Z Kulambayeva	4	6^{1}
A Ibragimova; K Zaytseva	6	7^{7}

Final
4	(Czech Republic) A Kučmová (Czech Republic) A Laboutková	4	6	[10]
A Ibragimova; K Zaytseva	6	2	[6]
