= 2021 Antalya Challenger – Singles =

Singles
- 2021 Antalya Challenger

Final
- Champion: (Spain) Jaume Munar
- Runner-up: (Italy) Lorenzo Musetti
- Score: 6–7^{(7–9)}, 6–2, 6–2

Events
Singles	Doubles
Antalya Challenger	· 2021 →

This was the first edition of the tournament and first of two editions of the tournament to start the 2021 ATP Challenger Tour year.

Jaume Munar won the title after defeating Lorenzo Musetti 6–7^{(7–9)}, 6–2, 6–2 in the final.

== Seeds ==
1. (Spain) Jaume Munar (champion)
2. (Colombia) Daniel Elahi Galán (first round)
3. (Brazil) Thiago Seyboth Wild (first round)
4. (Argentina) Facundo Bagnis (first round)
5. (Italy) Lorenzo Musetti (final)
6. (Germany) Daniel Altmaier (first round)
7. (Slovakia) Jozef Kovalík (first round)
8. (Argentina) Leonardo Mayer (second round)

== Draw ==
=== Key ===
- Q = Qualifier
- WC = Wild card
- LL = Lucky loser
- Alt = Alternate
- SE = Special exempt
- PR = Protected ranking
- ITF = ITF entry
- JE = Junior exempt
- w/o = Walkover
- r = Retired
- d = Defaulted
- SR = Special ranking

=== Finals ===
Semifinals
1	(Spain) Jaume Munar	6	6
(Spain) Tommy Robredo	0	1
WC	(Turkey) Cem İlkel	7^{8}	1	1
5	(Italy) Lorenzo Musetti	6^{6}	6	6

Final
1	(Spain) Jaume Munar	6^{7}	6	6
5	(Italy) Lorenzo Musetti	7^{9}	2	2

=== Top half ===
First round
1	(Spain) J Munar	6	6
(Spain) C Taberner	3	4
(Czech Republic) Z Kolář	6	3	7
(Italy) L Giustino	3	6	5
(Peru) JP Varillas	4	3
Q	(Dominican Republic) R Cid Subervi	6	6
(Italy) A Giannessi	6	7
7	(Slovakia) J Kovalík	4	5
4	(Argentina) F Bagnis	3	6^{4}
Q	(Slovenia) B Kavčič	6	7^{7}
(Germany) R Molleker	3	4
(Spain) T Robredo	6	6
Q	(Croatia) D Ajduković	6	6
WC	(Turkey) M İlhan	3	3
(Italy) P Lorenzi	6	6
6	(Germany) D Altmaier	4	2

Second round
1	(Spain) J Munar	6	6
(Czech Republic) Z Kolář	2	4
Q	(Dominican Republic) R Cid Subervi	3	2
(Italy) A Giannessi	6	6
Q	(Slovenia) B Kavčič	6	3	1
(Spain) T Robredo	4	6	6
Q	(Croatia) D Ajduković	3	6	7^{9}
(Italy) P Lorenzi	6	4	6^{7}

Quarterfinals
1	(Spain) J Munar	3	6	6
(Italy) A Giannessi	6	2	0
(Spain) T Robredo	6	6
Q	(Croatia) D Ajduković	1	4

Semifinals
1	(Spain) J Munar	6	6
(Spain) T Robredo	0	1

=== Bottom half ===
First round
8	(Argentina) L Mayer	6	6
(Netherlands) T Griekspoor	2	2
(Brazil) J Menezes	3	4
WC	(Turkey) C İlkel	6	6
(Egypt) M Safwat	6	5	6^{7}
(Portugal) J Domingues	4	7	7^{9}
LL	(Argentina) TM Etcheverry	7^{7}	6
3	(Brazil) T Seyboth Wild	6^{5}	4
5	(Italy) L Musetti	6	6
(Chile) A Tabilo	2	0
(United States) E Escobedo	6^{6}	3
(India) R Ramanathan	7^{8}	6
(Ecuador) E Gómez	6	6
WC	(Turkey) E Kırkın	4	1
Q	(Australia) A Santillan	6	2	7
2	(Colombia) DE Galán	2	6	5

Second round
8	(Argentina) L Mayer	5	1
WC	(Turkey) C İlkel	7	6
(Portugal) J Domingues	1	2
LL	(Argentina) TM Etcheverry	6	6
5	(Italy) L Musetti	6	6
(India) R Ramanathan	0	4
(Ecuador) E Gómez	0	1
Q	(Australia) A Santillan	6	6

Quarterfinals
WC	(Turkey) C İlkel	6^{5}	6	7^{7}
LL	(Argentina) TM Etcheverry	7^{7}	4	6^{4}
5	(Italy) L Musetti	5	6	6
Q	(Australia) A Santillan	7	3	4

Semifinals
WC	(Turkey) C İlkel	7^{8}	1	1
5	(Italy) L Musetti	6^{6}	6	6
