= 2021 Antalya Challenger – Doubles =

Doubles
- 2021 Antalya Challenger

Final
- Champions: (Ukraine) Denys Molchanov (Kazakhstan) Aleksandr Nedovyesov
- Runners-up: (Venezuela) Luis David Martínez (Spain) David Vega Hernández
- Score: 3–6, 6–4, [18–16]

Events
Singles	Doubles
Antalya Challenger	· 2021 →

This was the first edition of the tournament and first of two editions of the tournament to start the 2021 ATP Challenger Tour year.

Denys Molchanov and Aleksandr Nedovyesov won the title after defeating Luis David Martínez and David Vega Hernández 3–6, 6–4, [18–16] in the final.

== Seeds ==
1. (Venezuela) Luis David Martínez / (Spain) David Vega Hernández (final)
2. (Ukraine) Denys Molchanov / (Kazakhstan) Aleksandr Nedovyesov (champions)
3. (India) Purav Raja / (India) Ramkumar Ramanathan (first round)
4. (Finland) Harri Heliövaara / (Czech Republic) Zdeněk Kolář (quarterfinals)

== Draw ==
=== Key ===
- Q = Qualifier
- WC = Wild card
- LL = Lucky loser
- Alt = Alternate
- SE = Special exempt
- PR = Protected ranking
- ITF = ITF entry
- JE = Junior exempt
- w/o = Walkover
- r = Retired
- d = Defaulted
- SR = Special ranking

First round
1	(Venezuela) LD Martínez (Spain) D Vega Hernández	6	6
WC	(Turkey) S Ağabigün (Turkey) E Kırkın	1	4
(Brazil) R Matos (Brazil) F Meligeni Alves	6	6
(Italy) P Lorenzi (Brazil) T Seyboth Wild	4	1
3	(India) P Raja (India) R Ramanathan	1	3
Alt	(Italy) A Giannessi (Italy) L Musetti	6	6
(United States) E King (United States) N Pasha	5	7^{7}	[6]
(Argentina) L Mayer (Peru) JP Varillas	7	6^{4}	[10]
WC	(Turkey) M İlhan (Turkey) C İlkel	1	2
(Philippines) T Huey (Netherlands) S Verbeek	6	6
(Switzerland) L Margaroli (Romania) F Mergea	2	6	[1]
4	(Finland) H Heliövaara (Czech Republic) Z Kolář	6	4	[10]
(Colombia) DE Galán (Ecuador) E Gómez	4	6	[10]
(Slovakia) J Kovalík (Egypt) M Safwat	6	4	[8]
(United States) R Galloway (United States) A Lawson	4	2
2	(Ukraine) D Molchanov (Kazakhstan) A Nedovyesov	6	6

Quarterfinals
1	(Venezuela) LD Martínez (Spain) D Vega Hernández	7^{8}	3	[10]
(Brazil) R Matos (Brazil) F Meligeni Alves	6^{6}	6	[7]
Alt	(Italy) A Giannessi (Italy) L Musetti	w/o
(Argentina) L Mayer (Peru) JP Varillas
(Philippines) T Huey (Netherlands) S Verbeek	6	6^{3}	[10]
4	(Finland) H Heliövaara (Czech Republic) Z Kolář	3	7^{7}	[8]
(Colombia) DE Galán (Ecuador) E Gómez	3	1
2	(Ukraine) D Molchanov (Kazakhstan) A Nedovyesov	6	6

Semifinals
1	(Venezuela) LD Martínez (Spain) D Vega Hernández	6	6
Alt	(Italy) A Giannessi (Italy) L Musetti	0	3
(Philippines) T Huey (Netherlands) S Verbeek	4	2
2	(Ukraine) D Molchanov (Kazakhstan) A Nedovyesov	6	6

Final
1	(Venezuela) LD Martínez (Spain) D Vega Hernández	6	4	[16]
2	(Ukraine) D Molchanov (Kazakhstan) A Nedovyesov	3	6	[18]
