= 2021 Antalya Challenger II =

- Date: 1–7 February
- Edition: 2nd
- Surface: Clay
- Location: Antalya, Turkey

Champions

Singles
- (Spain) Carlos Taberner

Doubles
- (Ukraine) Denys Molchanov / (Kazakhstan) Aleksandr Nedovyesov
← 2021 ·	Antalya Challenger	· 2021 →

The 2021 Antalya Challenger II was a professional tennis tournament played on clay courts. It was the second edition of the tournament which was part of the 2021 ATP Challenger Tour. It took place in Antalya, Turkey between 1 and 7 February 2021.

== Singles main-draw entrants ==
=== Seeds ===
Country	Player	Rank^{1}	Seed
POR	João Sousa	92	1
ESP	Jaume Munar	110	2
COL	Daniel Elahi Galán	115	3
BRA	Thiago Seyboth Wild	118	4
SVK	Jozef Kovalík	125	5
ARG	Facundo Bagnis	126	6
ITA	Lorenzo Musetti	129	7
GER	Daniel Altmaier	132	8

- ^{1} Rankings as of 25 January 2021.

=== Other entrants ===
The following players received wildcards into the singles main draw:

- (Turkey) Sarp Ağabigün
- (Turkey) Marsel İlhan
- (Turkey) Ergi Kırkın

The following players received entry into the singles main draw as special exempts:

- (Turkey) Cem İlkel
- (Spain) Tommy Robredo

The following player received entry into the singles main draw as an alternate:

- (United States) Ernesto Escobedo

The following players received entry from the qualifying draw:

- (Croatia) Duje Ajduković
- (Argentina) Tomás Martín Etcheverry
- (Argentina) Facundo Mena
- (Australia) Akira Santillan

The following player received entry as a lucky loser:

- (Italy) Gian Marco Moroni

== Champions ==
=== Singles ===
- (Spain) Carlos Taberner def. (Spain) Jaume Munar 6–4, 6–1.

=== Doubles ===
- (Ukraine) Denys Molchanov / (Kazakhstan) Aleksandr Nedovyesov def. (United States) Robert Galloway / (United States) Alex Lawson 6–4, 7–6^{(7–2)}.
