= 2021 Antalya Challenger =

- Date: 25–31 January
- Edition: 1st
- Surface: Clay
- Location: Antalya, Turkey

Champions

Singles
- (Spain) Jaume Munar

Doubles
- (Ukraine) Denys Molchanov / (Kazakhstan) Aleksandr Nedovyesov
Antalya Challenger	· 2021 →

The 2021 Antalya Challenger was a professional tennis tournament played on clay courts. It was the first edition of the tournament which was part of the 2021 ATP Challenger Tour. It took place in Antalya, Turkey between 25 and 31 January 2021.

== Singles main-draw entrants ==
=== Seeds ===
Country	Player	Rank^{1}	Seed
ESP	Jaume Munar	110	1
COL	Daniel Elahi Galán	115	2
BRA	Thiago Seyboth Wild	118	3
ARG	Facundo Bagnis	125	4
ITA	Lorenzo Musetti	129	5
GER	Daniel Altmaier	130	6
SVK	Jozef Kovalík	131	7
ARG	Leonardo Mayer	135	8

- ^{1} Rankings as of 18 January 2021.

=== Other entrants ===
The following players received wildcards into the singles main draw:

- (Turkey) Marsel İlhan
- (Turkey) Cem İlkel
- (Turkey) Ergi Kırkın

The following players received entry from the qualifying draw:

- (Croatia) Duje Ajduković
- (Dominican Republic) Roberto Cid Subervi
- (Slovenia) Blaž Kavčič
- (Australia) Akira Santillan

The following player received entry as a lucky loser:

- (Argentina) Tomás Martín Etcheverry

== Champions ==
=== Singles ===
- (Spain) Jaume Munar def. (Italy) Lorenzo Musetti 6–7^{(7–9)}, 6–2, 6–2.

=== Doubles ===
- (Ukraine) Denys Molchanov / (Kazakhstan) Aleksandr Nedovyesov def. (Venezuela) Luis David Martínez / (Spain) David Vega Hernández 3–6, 6–4, [18–16].
