= 2021 Antalya Challenger III – Singles =

Singles
- 2021 Antalya Challenger III

Final
- Champion: (Portugal) Nuno Borges
- Runner-up: (United Kingdom) Ryan Peniston
- Score: 6–4, 6–3

Events
Singles	Doubles
- Antalya Challenger

Carlos Taberner was the defending champion but was not eligible to compete in the tournament due to his ATP ranking.

Nuno Borges won the title after defeating Ryan Peniston 6–4, 6–3 in the final.

== Seeds ==
1. (Turkey) Cem İlkel (second round)
2. (India) Ramkumar Ramanathan (quarterfinals)
3. (Portugal) João Domingues (second round)
4. (Croatia) Duje Ajduković (quarterfinals)
5. (Chinese Taipei) Tseng Chun-hsin (first round)
6. (Portugal) Nuno Borges (champion)
7. (France) Geoffrey Blancaneaux (second round)
8. (Portugal) Gonçalo Oliveira (first round, retired)

== Draw ==
Key

- Q = Qualifier
- WC = Wild card
- LL = Lucky loser
- Alt = Alternate
- ITF = ITF entry
- PR = Protected ranking
- SR = Special ranking
- SE = Special exempt
- JE = Junior exempt
- JR = Junior Accelerator Programme entrant
- CO = College Accelerator Programme entrant
- NG = Next Gen Accelerator Program entrant
- w/o = Walkover
- r = Retired
- d = Defaulted

=== Finals ===
Semifinals
(Spain) Javier Barranco Cosano	4	6^{2}
(United Kingdom) Ryan Peniston	6	7^{7}
6	(Portugal) Nuno Borges	6	6
(Spain) Eduard Esteve Lobato	3	3

Final
(United Kingdom) Ryan Peniston	4	3
6	(Portugal) Nuno Borges	6	6

=== Top half ===
First round
1/WC	(Turkey) C İlkel	6	6
Alt	(Chinese Taipei) Y-h Hsu	3	4
(Spain) J Barranco Cosano	7^{7}	6
(Spain) O Roca Batalla	6^{4}	4
Q	(Netherlands) M Veldheer	1	4
(Romania) FC Jianu	6	6
(Serbia) M Zekić	6^{2}	3
7	(France) G Blancaneaux	7^{7}	6
4	(Croatia) D Ajduković	6	5	7
(United States) N Chappell	4	7	5
Q	(Portugal) T Cação	6	6
WC	(Georgia (country)) A Metreveli	3	2
(United Kingdom) R Peniston	2	6	6
(Bosnia and Herzegovina) N Fatić	6	1	3
(Czech Republic) D Svrčina	6	0
8	(Portugal) G Oliveira	4	0^{r}

Second round
1/WC	(Turkey) C İlkel	6^{3}	3
(Spain) J Barranco Cosano	7^{7}	6
(Romania) FC Jianu	6^{5}	6	6
7	(France) G Blancaneaux	7^{7}	4	0
4	(Croatia) D Ajduković	6	6
Q	(Portugal) T Cação	2	1
(United Kingdom) R Peniston	2	6	6
(Czech Republic) D Svrčina	6	4	2

Quarterfinals
(Spain) J Barranco Cosano	6	4	6
(Romania) FC Jianu	1	6	4
4	(Croatia) D Ajduković	2	7	6^{2}
(United Kingdom) R Peniston	6	5	7^{7}

Semifinals
(Spain) J Barranco Cosano	4	6^{2}
(United Kingdom) R Peniston	6	7^{7}

=== Bottom half ===
First round
6	(Portugal) N Borges	6	6
(Turkey) E Kırkın	4	3
(Russia) E Tiurnev	6^{5}	7	3^{r}
WC	(Turkey) Y Erel	7^{7}	5	3
(Dominican Republic) N Hardt	6	6
(Tunisia) A Dougaz	2	2
(Italy) R Bonadio	6^{4}	6	1
3	(Portugal) J Domingues	7^{7}	4	6
5	(Chinese Taipei) C-h Tseng	2	7	6^{7}
(Austria) F Misolic	6	5	7^{9}
Alt	(South Korea) D-h Lee	2	3
(Spain) Eduard Esteve Lobato	6	6
(Spain) N Sánchez Izquierdo	1	3
Q	(United States) O Crawford	6	6
Q	(Germany) L Wessels	2	3
2	(India) R Ramanathan	6	6

Second round
6	(Portugal) N Borges	6	6
WC	(Turkey) Y Erel	4	0
(Dominican Republic) N Hardt	6	7
3	(Portugal) J Domingues	4	5
(Austria) F Misolic	2	3
(Spain) E Esteve Lobato	6	6
Q	(United States) O Crawford	5	4
2	(India) R Ramanathan	7	6

Quarterfinals
6	(Portugal) N Borges	6	6
(Dominican Republic) N Hardt	2	4
(Spain) E Esteve Lobato	6	6
2	(India) R Ramanathan	2	0

Semifinals
6	(Portugal) N Borges	6	6
(Spain) E Esteve Lobato	3	3
