= 2026 Antalya Challenger 4 – Singles =

Singles
- 2026 Antalya Challenger 4

Final
- Champion: (Bulgaria) Rositsa Dencheva
- Runner-up: Alevtina Ibragimova
- Score: 7–5, 6–4

Events
Singles	Doubles
- Antalya Challenger

Rositsa Dencheva won the title, defeating Alevtina Ibragimova 7–5, 6–4 in the final.

Anhelina Kalinina was the defending champion, but chose not to participate.

== Seeds ==
1. (United Kingdom) Francesca Jones (second round)
2. (Poland) Katarzyna Kawa (first round)
3. (Italy) Lucia Bronzetti (first round)
4. (Spain) Leyre Romero Gormaz (second round)
5. (Bulgaria) Elizara Yaneva (quarterfinals)
6. Elena Pridankina (first round)
7. (Serbia) Mia Ristić (first round)
8. (Netherlands) Eva Vedder (second round)

== Draw ==
Key

- Q = Qualifier
- WC = Wild card
- LL = Lucky loser
- Alt = Alternate
- ITF = ITF entry
- PR = Protected ranking
- SR = Special ranking
- SE = Special exempt
- JE = Junior exempt
- JR = Junior Accelerator Programme entrant
- CO = College Accelerator Programme entrant
- NG = Next Gen Accelerator Program entrant
- w/o = Walkover
- r = Retired
- d = Defaulted

=== Finals ===
Semifinals
Q	(Bulgaria) Rositsa Dencheva	4	6	6
(Spain) Irene Burillo	6	4	4
Alevtina Ibragimova	4	6	6
(Spain) Alicia Herrero Liñana	6	2	3

Final
Q	(Bulgaria) Rositsa Dencheva	7	6
Alevtina Ibragimova	5	4

=== Top half ===
First round
1	(United Kingdom) F Jones	6	6
(Cyprus) R Șerban	4	3
Q	(Turkey) İ Öz	6	5	0
Q	(Bulgaria) R Dencheva	4	7	6
(Argentina) ML Carlé	5	7	7^{7}
(Poland) G Feistel	7	5	6^{1}
Q	(Italy) S De Stefano	2	4
8	(Netherlands) E Vedder	6	6
3	(Italy) L Bronzetti	6	3	4
(Spain) I Burillo	3	6	6
(Italy) F Urgesi	6	3	5
(Romania) M Bulgaru	1	6	7
(Slovakia) R Zelníčková	4	4
(Kazakhstan) Z Kulambayeva	6	6
(Poland) W Falkowska	1	6	6^{4}
5	(Bulgaria) E Yaneva	6	1	7^{7}

Second round
1	(United Kingdom) F Jones	6^{5}	7	4
Q	(Bulgaria) R Dencheva	7^{7}	5	6
(Argentina) ML Carlé	6	6
8	(Netherlands) E Vedder	1	2
(Spain) I Burillo	4	6	6
(Romania) M Bulgaru	6	3	2
(Kazakhstan) Z Kulambayeva	3	6	4
5	(Bulgaria) E Yaneva	6	3	6

Quarterfinals
Q	(Bulgaria) R Dencheva	7	6
(Argentina) ML Carlé	5	2
(Spain) I Burillo	6	1	6
5	(Bulgaria) E Yaneva	2	6	4

Semifinals
Q	(Bulgaria) R Dencheva	4	6	6
(Spain) I Burillo	6	4	4

=== Bottom half ===
First round
7	(Serbia) M Ristić	1	3
(North Macedonia) L Gjorcheska	6	6
S Lansere	2	2
(Italy) A Zantedeschi	6	6
(Czech Republic) J Štruplová	2	6^{2}
A Ibragimova	6	7^{7}
(Turkey) B Cengiz	7^{10}	5	6^{6}
4	(Spain) L Romero Gormaz	6^{8}	7	7^{8}
6	E Pridankina	3	6^{10}
(Spain) A Mintegi del Olmo	6	7^{12}
Q	(Germany) N Schunk	0	3
(Spain) A Herrero Liñana	6	6
(Morocco) Y Kabbaj	6	4	2
WC	(Turkey) C Büyükakçay	2	6	6
(Germany) E Bennemann	6	7
2	(Poland) K Kawa	2	5

Second round
(North Macedonia) L Gjorcheska	6	3	1
(Italy) A Zantedeschi	4	6	6
A Ibragimova	7	6
4	(Spain) L Romero Gormaz	5	1
(Spain) A Mintegi del Olmo	3	2
(Spain) A Herrero Liñana	6	6
WC	(Turkey) C Büyükakçay	4	4
(Germany) E Bennemann	6	6

Quarterfinals
(Italy) A Zantedeschi	2	3
A Ibragimova	6	6
(Spain) A Herrero Liñana	6	6
(Germany) E Bennemann	3	2

Semifinals
A Ibragimova	4	6	6
(Spain) A Herrero Liñana	6	2	3

== Qualifying ==
=== Seeds ===
1. (Italy) Samira De Stefano (qualified)
2. (Bulgaria) Rositsa Dencheva (qualified)
3. Rada Zolotareva (qualifying competition)
4. (Germany) Nastasja Schunk (qualified)
5. (Slovenia) Dalila Jakupović (first round)
6. (Italy) Miriana Tona (qualifying competition)
7. (Egypt) Sandra Samir (first round)
8. (Croatia) Tena Lukas (qualifying competition)

=== Qualifiers ===
1. (Italy) Samira De Stefano
2. (Bulgaria) Rositsa Dencheva
3. (Turkey) İpek Öz
4. (Germany) Nastasja Schunk

=== Qualifying draw ===
==== First qualifier ====
First round
1	(Italy) Samira De Stefano	6	6
(Hungary) Adrienn Nagy	2	1
(Turkey) İlay Yörük	6	6
7	(Egypt) Sandra Samir	0	4

Qualifying competition
1	(Italy) Samira De Stefano	6	6
(Turkey) İlay Yörük	1	0

==== Second qualifier ====
First round
2	(Bulgaria) Rositsa Dencheva	6	6
(Latvia) Adelina Lačinova	4	0
(Bulgaria) Denislava Glushkova	3	1
6	(Italy) Miriana Tona	6	6

Qualifying competition
2	(Bulgaria) Rositsa Dencheva	6	6
6	(Italy) Miriana Tona	1	4

==== Third qualifier ====
First round
3	Rada Zolotareva	7^{7}	6
(Czech Republic) Aneta Laboutková	6^{2}	4
(Turkey) İpek Öz	6	6
5	(Slovenia) Dalila Jakupović	2	0

Qualifying competition
3	Rada Zolotareva	7^{7}	4	4
(Turkey) İpek Öz	6^{5}	6	6

==== Fourth qualifier ====
First round
4	(Germany) Nastasja Schunk	6	6
WC	(Turkey) Ceylin Öz	2	0
WC	(Turkey) Aya Akan	0	0
8	(Croatia) Tena Lukas	6	6

Qualifying competition
4	(Germany) Nastasja Schunk	6	6
8	(Croatia) Tena Lukas	4	1
