= Ksenia Zaytseva =

Russian tennis player (born 2004)

- Full name: Ksenia Eduardovna Zaytseva
- Country (sports): Russia
- Born: 13 September 2004 (age 22) Khimki, Russia
- Plays: Right-handed
- Prize money: $96,095

Singles
- Career record: 144–88
- Career titles: 4 ITF
- Highest ranking: No. 359 (15 January 2024)
- Current ranking: No. 369 (12 October 2026)

Doubles
- Career record: 93–60
- Career titles: 8 ITF
- Highest ranking: No. 200 (16 March 2026)
- Current ranking: No. 229 (12 October 2026)
Medal record
Representing Individual Neutral Athletes
World University Games
Bronze medal – third place	2025 Rhine-Ruhr	Doubles
- Last updated on: 12 October 2026.

Ksenia Eduardovna Zaytseva (Russian: Ксения Эдуардовна Зайцева, born 13 September 2004) is a Russian tennis player.

Zaytseva has a career-high singles ranking by the WTA of 359, achieved on 15 January 2024, and has a career-high doubles ranking of 200, achieved on 16 March 2026.

In 2019, Zaytseva defeated Swiss Sebastianna Scilipoti at the Tennis Europe Junior Masters U16 and became the champion. Zaytseva was chosen as the player of the year in the U16 category by Tennis Europe in 2019.

Partnering Anna Sisková, Zaytseva won her first $50k tournament in January 2024 at the ITF event in Nonthaburi, Thailand.

In 2025, she won a bronze medal in doubles at the 2025 Summer World University Games.

== WTA 125 finals ==
=== Doubles: 1 (runner-up) ===
Result	W–L	Date	Tournament	Surface	Partner	Opponents	Score
Loss	0–1	Sep 2026	Antalya Challenger, Turkey	Clay	Alevtina Ibragimova	(Czech Republic) Aneta Kučmová (Czech Republic) Aneta Laboutková	6–4, 2–6, [6–10]

== ITF Circuit finals ==
=== Singles: 5 (4 titles, 1 runner-up) ===
Legend W35 tournaments (1–0) W15 tournaments (4–1)	Finals by surface Hard (0–1) Clay (3–0)

Result	W–L	Date	Tournament	Tier	Surface	Opponent	Score
Loss	0–1	Oct 2022	Sharm El Sheikh, Egypt	W15	Hard	(Romania) Karola Patricia Bejenaru	6–7^{(3)}, 4–6
Win	1–1	Mar 2024	Heraklion, Greece	W15	Clay	(Lithuania) Klaudija Bubelytė	6–2, 7–5
Win	2–1	Jun 2026	Kuršumlijska Banja, Serbia	W15	Clay	(Switzerland) Marie Mettraux	6–1, 6–1
Win	3–1	Jun 2026	Kuršumlijska Banja, Serbia	W15	Clay	(France) Nina Radovanović	7–5, 6–3
Win	4–1	Aug 2026	Serbian Tennis Tour, Serbia	W35	Clay	(Italy) Giorgia Pedone	6–4, 6–3

=== Doubles: 13 (9 titles, 4 runner-ups) ===
Legend W50 tournaments (5–0) W35 tournaments (3–1) W15 tournaments (1–3)	Finals by surface Hard (4–2) Clay (5–2)

Result	W–L	Date	Tournament	Tier	Surface	Partner	Opponents	Score
Loss	0–1	Apr 2022	ITF Shymkent, Kazakhstan	W15	Clay	(Russia) Ekaterina Maklakova	(Kazakhstan) Zhibek Kulambayeva (Russia) Anastasia Sukhotina	1–6, 4–6
Win	1–1	Jan 2024	ITF Nonthaburi, Thailand	W50	Hard	(Czech Republic) Anna Sisková	(Poland) Maja Chwalińska (Japan) Yuki Naito	7–5, 7–6^{(7–3)}
Loss	1–2	Mar 2024	ITF Heraklion, Greece	W15	Clay	(France) Lucie Nguyen Tan	(Greece) Eleni Christofi (Greece) Sapfo Sakellaridi	3–6, 3–6
Win	2–2	Apr 2024	ITF Hammamet, Tunisia	W35	Hard	(Czech Republic) Julie Štruplová	(Colombia) María Herazo González (Australia) Kaylah McPhee	6–4, 4–6, 10–4
Loss	2–3	Apr 2024	ITF Hammamet, Tunisia	W35	Hard	(Australia) Kaylah McPhee	(Netherlands) Jasmijn Gimbrère (Kazakhstan) Zhibek Kulambayeva	4–6, 5–7
Loss	2–4	Jan 2025	ITF Monastir, Tunisia	W15	Hard	(Japan) Hayu Kinoshita	(Japan) Hiromi Abe (Japan) Mayuka Aikawa	3–6, 0–6
Win	3–4	Mar 2025	ITF Bujumbura, Burundi	W50	Clay	(Switzerland) Chelsea Fontenel	(Netherlands) Demi Tran (Netherlands) Lian Tran	4–6, 6–1, [11–9]
Win	4–4	May 2025	ITF Lopota, Georgia	W50	Hard	Kira Pavlova	Varvara Panshina; Daria Zelinskaya	6–4, 4–6, [10–7]
Win	5–4	Aug 2025	ITF Kuršumlijska Banja, Serbia	W35	Clay	Alexandra Shubladze	(Germany) Katharina Hobgarski (Greece) Martha Matoula	6–2, 6–1
Win	6–4	Oct 2025	ITF Heraklion, Greece	W50	Clay	(Greece) Martha Matoula	Elina Nepliy (United States) Hibah Shaikh	7–6^{(5)}, 6–0
Win	7–4	Jun 2026	ITF Kuršumlijska Banja, Serbia	W15	Clay	(Greece) Marianne Argyrokastriti	(Serbia) Anja Stanković (France) Helena Stevic	6–0, 7–6^{(4)}
Win	8–4	Aug 2026	Serbian Tennis Tour, Serbia	W35	Clay	Alina Yuneva	Maria Golovina (Serbia) Natalija Senić	6–0, 6–4
Win	9–4	Oct 2026	ITF Istanbul, Türkiye	W50	Hard (i)	Daria Egorova	Anna Sedysheva; Ksenia Smirnova	2–6, 6–0, [10–1]
