= Alevtina Ibragimova =

Russian tennis player (born 2005)

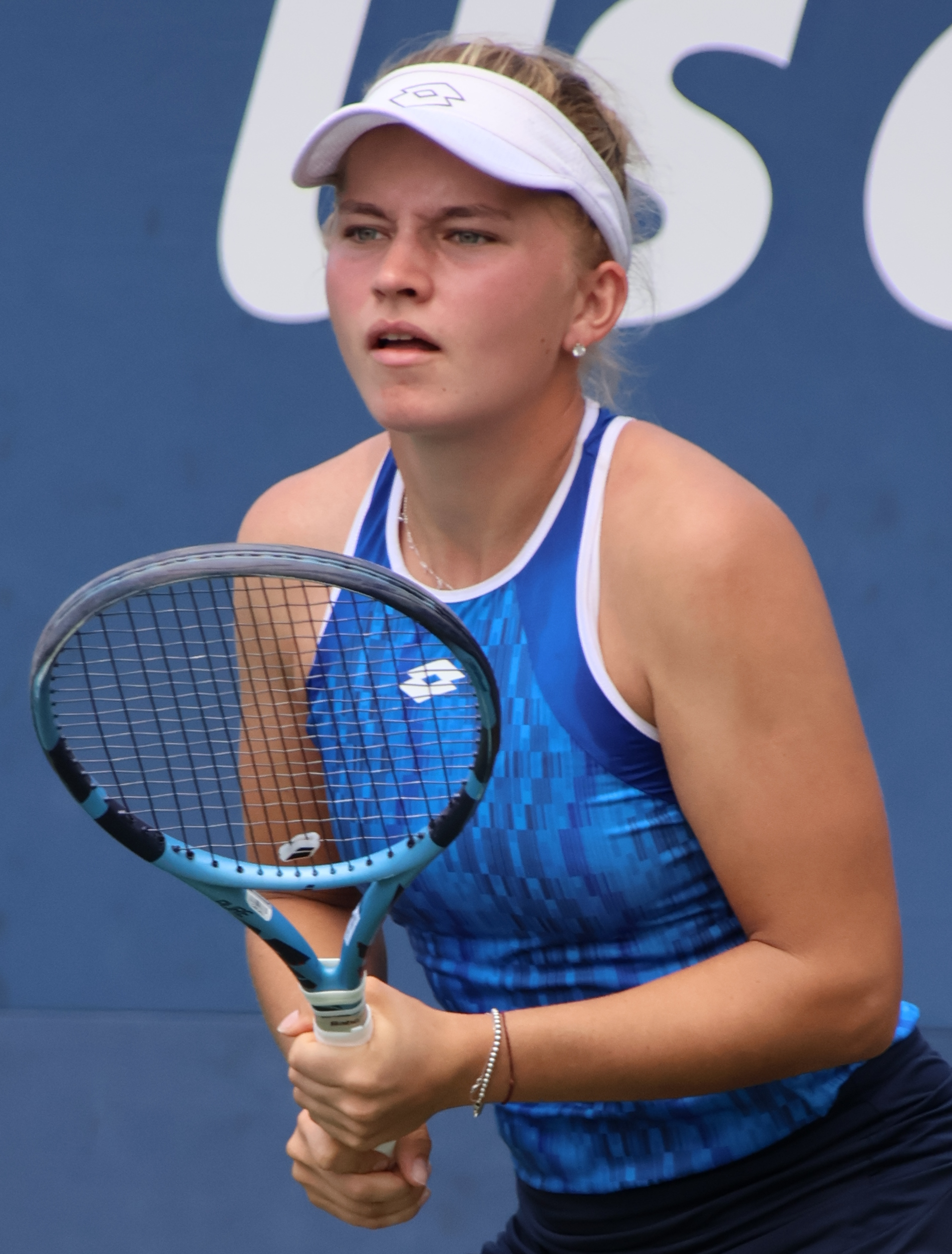
- Ibragimova at the 2026 US Open
- Full name: Alevtina Vladimirovna Ibragimova
- Native name: Алевтина Владимировна Ибрагимова
- Country (sports): Russia
- Born: 19 January 2005 (age 21) Moscow, Russia
- Plays: Right-handed
- Prize money: $186,864

Singles
- Career record: 152–97
- Career titles: 1 ITF
- Highest ranking: No. 166 (14 September 2026)
- Current ranking: No. 169 (12 October 2026)

Grand Slam singles results
- US Open: Q2 (2026)

Doubles
- Career record: 74–69
- Career titles: 7 ITF
- Highest ranking: No. 196 (19 May 2025)
- Current ranking: No. 230 (12 October 2026)
Medal record
Representing Individual Neutral Athletes
World University Games
| Silver medal – second place | 2025 Rhine-Ruhr | Singles |
| Bronze medal – third place | 2025 Rhine-Ruhr | Doubles |
- Last updated on: 12 October 2026.

Alevtina Vladimirovna Ibragimova (Russian: Алевтина Владимировна Ибрагимова, born 19 January 2005) is a Russian tennis player.

Ibragimova has a career-high singles ranking by the WTA of No. 166, reached in September 2026, and a career-high doubles ranking of No. 196, achieved on 19 May 2025.

== Career ==
Ibragimova won her first bigger ITF title at the W75 Open Andrézieux-Bouthéon in the doubles draw, partnering with Ekaterina Ovcharenko.

In August 2024, she achieved his first career singles title in Leipzig, Germany, where she beat German player Alexandra Vecic in the final, in three sets. In November, she became champion in doubles with her Dutch partner Lian Tran at the W75 tournament in Pétange, Luxembourg.

She also won a bronze medal in doubles and a silver medal in singles at the 2025 Summer World University Games.

Ibragimova made her WTA Tour main-draw debut for the 2026 Iași Open where she received entry into the singles tournament as a qualifier and lost in the second round to Paula Badosa, in three sets.

Ibragimova entered the main draw at the 2026 Korea Open again after qualifying but lost in the first round to Ku Yeon-woo, in straight sets.

== WTA 125 finals ==
=== Singles: 1 (runner-up) ===
| Result | W–L | Date | Tournament | Surface | Opponent | Score |
|---|---|---|---|---|---|---|
| Loss | 0–1 | Sep 2026 | Antalya Challenger, Turkey | Clay | (Bulgaria) Rositsa Dencheva | 5–7, 4–6 |

=== Doubles: 1 (runner-up) ===
| Result | W–L | Date | Tournament | Surface | Partner | Opponents | Score |
|---|---|---|---|---|---|---|---|
| Loss | 0–1 | Sep 2026 | Antalya Challenger, Turkey | Clay | Ksenia Zaytseva | (Czech Republic) Aneta Kučmová (Czech Republic) Aneta Laboutková | 6–4, 2–6, [6–10] |

== ITF Circuit finals ==
=== Singles: 4 (1 title, 3 runner-ups) ===
| Legend W75 tournaments W35 tournaments W15 tournaments | Finals by surface Hard (0–1) Clay (1–2) |

| Result | W–L | Date | Tournament | Tier | Surface | Opponent | Score |
|---|---|---|---|---|---|---|---|
| Loss | 0–1 | May 2023 | ITF Antalya, Turkey | W15 | Clay | Valeriya Yushchenko | 6–7^{(3)}, 0–6 |
| Win | 1–1 | Aug 2024 | ITF Leipzig, Germany | W35 | Clay | (Germany) Alexandra Vecic | 6–2, 1–6, 6–2 |
| Loss | 1–2 | Nov 2025 | Fujairah Open, UAE | W75 | Hard | (Croatia) Petra Marčinko | 4–6, 4–6 |
| Loss | 1–3 | Jun 2026 | Internationaux de Blois, France | W75 | Clay | (Malta) Francesca Curmi | 3–6, 5–7 |

=== Doubles: 12 (7 titles, 5 runner-ups) ===
| Legend W75 tournaments (3–0) W50 tournaments (0–3) W35 tournaments (3–2) W15 tournaments (1–0) | Finals by surface Hard (5–1) Clay (2–4) |

| Result | W–L | Date | Tournament | Tier | Surface | Partner | Opponents | Score |
|---|---|---|---|---|---|---|---|---|
| Win | 1–0 | May 2023 | ITF Antalya, Turkey | W15 | Clay | Alexandra Shubladze | (Turkey) Leyla Nilüfer Elmas (Turkey) Başak Eraydın | 6–4, 1–6, [10–3] |
| Win | 2–0 | Feb 2024 | Open Andrézieux-Bouthéon, France | W75 | Hard (i) | Ekaterina Ovcharenko | (United Kingdom) Emily Appleton (United Kingdom) Freya Christie | 3–6, 6–3, [10–5] |
| Loss | 2–1 | Jun 2024 | ITF Ystad, Sweden | W50 | Hard | Anna Zyryanova | (Belgium) Marie Benoît (Netherlands) Lesley Pattinama Kerkhove | 3–6, 1–6 |
| Win | 3–1 | Jun 2024 | ITF Périgueux, France | W35 | Clay | (Croatia) Mariana Dražić | (France) Émeline Dartron (France) Jenny Lim | 7–5, 2–6, [10–5] |
| Win | 4–1 | Nov 2024 | Kyotec Open, Luxembourg | W75 | Hard (i) | (Netherlands) Lian Tran | (Czech Republic) Jesika Malečková (Czech Republic) Miriam Škoch | 1–6, 6–2, [11–9] |
| Win | 5–1 | Jan 2025 | Pune Championships, India | W75 | Hard | Elena Pridankina | Maria Kozyreva; Iryna Shymanovich | 6–2, 1–6, [10–8] |
| Loss | 5–2 | Jun 2025 | ITF Stuttgart-Vaihingen, Germany | W35 | Clay | (Switzerland) Chelsea Fontenel | (Greece) Martha Matoula (Slovakia) Radka Zelníčková | 6–7^{(5)}, 5–7 |
| Loss | 5–3 | Sep 2025 | Pazardzhik Cup, Bulgaria | W50+H | Clay | (France) Yara Bartashevich | (Bulgaria) Lia Karatancheva (Greece) Sapfo Sakellaridi | 2–6, 5–7 |
| Win | 6–3 | Oct 2025 | ITF Istanbul, Turkey | W35 | Hard (i) | (Romania) Elena Ruxandra Bertea | Varvara Panshina; Daria Zelinskaya | 6–3, 6–2 |
| Win | 7–3 | Mar 2026 | ITF Maanshan, China | W35 | Hard (i) | Daria Egorova | Varvara Panshina (China) Wang Jiaqi | 7–6^{(3)}, 3–6, [10–6] |
| Loss | 7–4 | May 2026 | ITF Portorož, Slovenia | W50 | Clay | (Hungary) Amarissa Tóth | (Italy) Angelica Moratelli; Anastasia Tikhonova | 6–3, 3–6, [4–10] |
| Loss | 7–5 | Jun 2026 | ITF Nice, France | W35+H | Clay | Arina Bulatova | (Switzerland) Alina Granwehr (Germany) Julia Stusek | 7–5, 6–7^{(10)}, [4–10] |
