= Rositsa Dencheva =

Bulgarian tennis player (born 2007)

- Native name: Росица Денчева
- Country (sports): Bulgaria
- Residence: Sofia, Bulgaria
- Born: 10 March 2007 (age 19) Pleven, Bulgaria
- Prize money: $78,927

Singles
- Career record: 117–55
- Career titles: 1 WTA 125
- Highest ranking: No. 195 (12 October 2026)
- Current ranking: No. 202 (9 November 2026)

Grand Slam singles results
- Australian Open Junior: 3R (2023)
- French Open Junior: SF (2025)
- Wimbledon Junior: QF (2024)
- US Open Junior: 3R (2024)

Doubles
- Career record: 39–31
- Career titles: 3 ITF
- Highest ranking: No. 210 (26 October 2026)
- Current ranking: No. 210 (26 October 2026)

Grand Slam doubles results
- Australian Open Junior: QF (2025)
- French Open Junior: 2R (2023, 2024, 2025)
- Wimbledon Junior: 2R (2024)
- US Open Junior: 1R (2023, 2024)
- Last updated on: 10 November 2026.

Rositsa Dencheva (Bulgarian: Росица Денчева; born 10 March 2007) is a Bulgarian professional tennis player. She has a career-high singles ranking by the WTA of No. 195, achieved on 12 October 2026, and a best in doubles of No. 210, achieved on 26 October 2026.

Dencheva has won one title at WTA 125 level, in singles.

== Early life ==
Dencheva was born in Pleven. She began playing tennis at the age of four. At the age of 12, she and her family moved to Sofia.

== Juniors ==
In late 2021, she won the U14 Eddie Herr International Championships and reached the semifinals of the U14 Junior Orange Bowl. In January 2023, she made her major debut at the Australian Open, where she reached the girls' singles third round.

In February 2024, she won the J500 EGY5 Smash ITF junior tournament in Cairo, defeating top seed Laura Samson in the final. That April, she won the J300 Plovdiv Cup, defeating compatriot Elizara Yaneva in the final. Unseeded at Wimbledon, she reached the girls' singles quarterfinals, before losing to eventual champion, Renáta Jamrichová.

In January 2025, she and Yaneva reached the girls' doubles quarterfinals of the Australian Open, before losing to eventual champions, Annika and Kristina Penickova. Unseeded at the French Open, she upset second-seeded Kristina Penickova in the girls' singles first round and reached the semifinals, before losing to Hannah Klugman.

== Professional ==
In October 2022, she made her professional debut, after qualifying for the W25 Santa Marina Cup I in Sozopol, but she lost in the first round to Cristina Dinu. She recorded her first professional win two weeks later at the Santa Marina Cup III, defeating Laura Hietaranta, before again losing to Dinu in the following round. In October 2023, she reached back-to-back semifinals at the W15 events in Heraklion and Monastir.

In March 2024, she advanced to the quarterfinals of the W15 event in Heraklion. The following month, she reached her first professional final in Antalya, but lost to Laura Hietaranta.

In August 2026, she and Russian partner Varvara Panshina won the women's doubles final at the W75 event of the Serbian Tennis Tour held in Kuršumlijska Banja, Serbia. Defeating Chinese pairing Feng Shuo and Li Zongyu. This championship is her first bigger title. In the singles draw, she was defeated by Serbian player Mia Ristić, in straight sets.

In September 2026, Dencheva claimed her first WTA 125 title at the Antalya Open 4, making her way into the main-draw through qualifying and winning seven successive matches, culminating in defeating Alevtina Ibragimova in the final.

== National representation ==
In 2022, Dencheva made her Billie Jean King Cup debut representing Bulgaria in the Europe/Africa Zone Group I.

== WTA 125 finals ==
=== Singles: 1 (title) ===
Result	W–L	Date	Tournament	Surface	Opponent	Score
Win	1–0	Sep 2026	Antalya Challenger, Turkey	Clay	Alevtina Ibragimova	7–5, 6–4

== ITF Circuit finals ==
=== Singles: 6 (4 titles, 2 runner-ups) ===
Legend
W75 tournaments
W35 tournaments
W15 tournaments

Result	W–L	Date	Tournament	Tier	Surface	Opponent	Score
Loss	0–1	Apr 2024	ITF Antalya, Turkiye	W15	Clay	(Finland) Laura Hietaranta	1–6, 1–6
Win	1–1	Mar 2025	ITF Heraklion, Greece	W15	Clay	(Spain) Alba Rey García	2–6, 6–1, 6–1
Win	2–1	Mar 2025	ITF Heraklion, Greece	W15	Clay	(Germany) Franziska Sziedat	3–6, 6–4, 6–4
Win	3–1	Mar 2026	ITF Santa Margherita di Pula, Italy	W35	Clay	(France) Alice Ramé	6–0, 6–3
Win	4–1	Jul 2026	ITF Buzău, Romania	W35	Clay	(Czech Republic) Julie Štruplová	6–0, 6–3
Loss	4–2	Aug 2026	ITF Kuršumlijska Banja, Serbia	W75	Clay	(Serbia) Mia Ristić	0–6, 6–7^{(4)}

=== Doubles: 8 (3 titles, 5 runner-ups) ===
Legend
W100 tournaments
W75 tournaments
W50 tournaments
W35 tournaments
W15 tournaments

Result	W–L	Date	Tournament	Tier	Surface	Partner	Opponents	Score
Loss	0–1	Mar 2025	ITF Heraklion, Greece	W15	Clay	(Germany) Franziska Sziedat	(Germany) Katharina Hobgarski (Hungary) Adrienn Nagy	1–6, 1–6
Loss	0–2	Aug 2025	Verbier Open, Switzerland	W35	Clay	(Poland) Monika Stankiewicz	(France) Tiphanie Lemaître (Australia) Tina Nadine Smith	7–6^{(3)}, 3–6, [5–10]
Loss	0–3	Aug 2025	Verbier Open, Switzerland	W35	Clay	(Poland) Monika Stankiewicz	(Germany) Marie Vogt (Germany) Eva Marie Voracek	walkover
Win	1–3	Nov 2025	ITF Heraklion, Greece	W35	Clay	(Romania) Bianca Bărbulescu	(Slovakia) Laura Svatíková (Serbia) Draginja Vuković	walkover
Loss	1–4	Mar 2026	ITF Heraklion, Greece	W50	Clay	(Italy) Vittoria Paganetti	(Czech Republic) Alena Kovačková (Czech Republic) Jana Kovačková	4–6, 3–6
Loss	1–5	Jun 2026	Zagreb Ladies Open, Croatia	W100	Clay	Ekaterina Kazionova	(Croatia) Lucija Ćirić Bagarić (Italy) Angelica Moratelli	5–7, 3–6
Win	2–5	Aug 2026	ITF Kuršumlijska Banja, Serbia	W75	Clay	Varvara Panshina	(China) Feng Shuo (China) Li Zongyu	6–4, 7–5
Win	3–5	Aug 2026	ITF Kuršumlijska Banja, Serbia	W50	Clay	Maria Golovina	(Bulgaria) Lia Karatancheva (India) Prarthana Thombare	6–4, 6–7^{(0)}, [10–7]
