= Denys Molchanov =

Ukrainian tennis player

Denys Molchanov Денис Молчанов
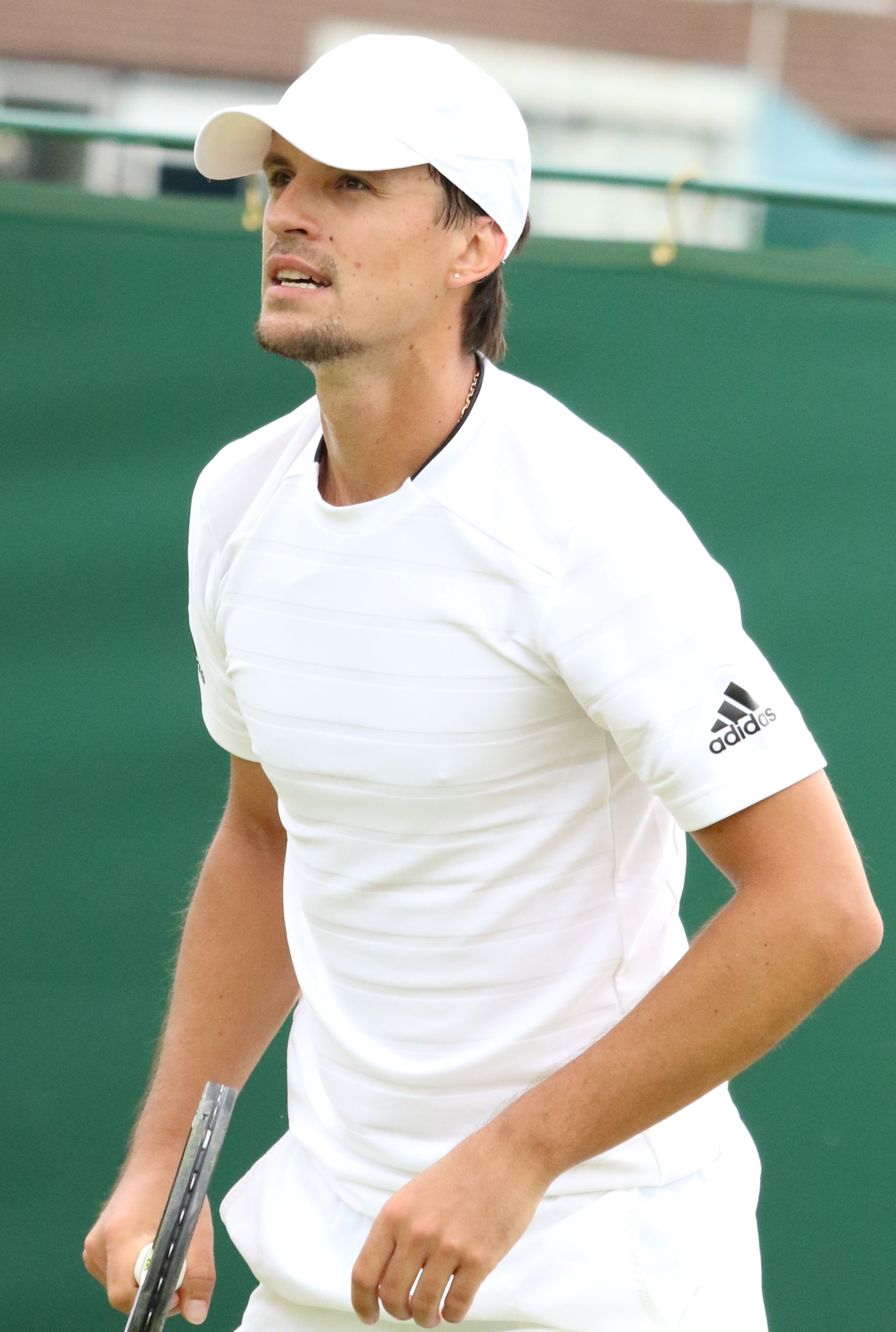
- Country (sports): Moldova (2003 – October 2006); Ukraine (November 2006 –present)
- Born: 16 May 1987 (age 39) Chișinău, Moldavian SSR, Soviet Union
- Height: 1.88 m (6 ft 2 in)
- Plays: Right-handed (Double-handed Backhand)
- Coach: Peter Molchanov
- Prize money: $ 931,067

Singles
- Career record: 2–2
- Career titles: 0
- Highest ranking: No. 169 (5 January 2015)

Grand Slam singles results
- Australian Open: Q2 (2016)
- French Open: Q2 (2015)
- Wimbledon: Q1 (2016)
- US Open: Q2 (2014)

Doubles
- Career record: 57–84
- Career titles: 2
- Highest ranking: No. 58 (29 January 2024)
- Current ranking: No. 97 (16 June 2025)

Grand Slam doubles results
- Australian Open: 3R (2024)
- French Open: 2R (2012, 2019)
- Wimbledon: 2R (2016)
- US Open: 1R (2019, 2023)

Grand Slam mixed doubles results
- Wimbledon: 2R (2019)
- Last updated on: 16 June 2025.

Denys Petrovych Molchanov (Ukrainian: Денис Петрович Молчанов; born 16 May 1987) is a Ukrainian tennis player competing on the ATP Challenger Tour. He reached his highest ATP doubles ranking of world No. 58 on 29 January 2024. In 2015 he reached his highest singles ranking of No. 169.

He has won two ATP doubles titles. He has also won 15 ITF singles and 66 doubles titles, 36 of them Challengers. He also played for the Ukraine Davis Cup team.

== Career ==
=== 2018: Maiden ATP doubles final ===
Molchanov reached his first ATP doubles final at the 2018 Swiss Open in Gstaad partnering Igor Zelenay.

=== 2022: Maiden ATP title ===
At the 2022 Melbourne Summer Set 1 Molchanov reached the semifinals partnering Ričardas Berankis losing to sixth seeds Aleksandr Nedovyesov and Aisam-ul-Haq Qureshi.

At the 2022 Open 13 Molchanov won his first title partnering Russian Andrey Rublev in Marseilles.

=== 2023: 35th Challenger title, second ATP title, top 65 ===
Molchanov won his 34th Challenger and first Challenger 175 in Turin partnering Kazakhstani Andrey Golubev. As a result, he returned to the top 100 in the doubles rankings on 22 May 2023.

He reached his third doubles final at the 2023 Stockholm Open and won his second title with Andrey Golubev. As a result, he reached world No. 62, a new career high doubles ranking on 23 October 2023.

=== 2024: Win over world No. 1 pair, Major third round, top 60 ===
At the 2024 Australian Open partnering Nikola Ćaćić the pair defeated the world No. 1 and No. 2 players, the top seeded pair of Austin Krajicek and Ivan Dodig in the second round to reach the third round, Molchanov's first third round at a Major. As a result he reached a new career-high doubles ranking of world No. 58 on 29 January 2024.

== Performance timelines ==
Key
W	F	SF	QF	#R	RR	Q#	DNQ	A	NH

(W) winner; (F) finalist; (SF) semifinalist; (QF) quarterfinalist; (#R) rounds 4, 3, 2, 1; (RR) round-robin stage; (Q#) qualification round; (DNQ) did not qualify; (A) absent; (NH) not held; (SR) strike rate (events won / competed); (W–L) win–loss record.
To avoid confusion and double counting, these charts are updated at the conclusion of a tournament or when the player's participation has ended.

== Personal information ==
Denys Molchanov lives with his family in Zagreb.

In February 2015, he faced never confirmed or investigated allegations of match-fixing after suspicious betting patterns and unforced errors were noticed during a defeat to Agustín Velotti.

== ATP career finals ==
=== Doubles: 3 (2 titles, 1 runner-up) ===
Legend Grand Slam tournaments (0–0) ATP World Tour Finals (0–0) ATP World Tour Masters 1000 (0–0) ATP World Tour 500 Series (0–0) ATP World Tour 250 Series (2–1)	Titles by surface Hard (2–0) Clay (0–1) Grass (0–0)	Titles by setting Outdoor (0–1) Indoor (1–0)

Result	W–L	Date	Tournament	Tier	Surface	Partner	Opponents	Score
Loss	0–1	Jul 2018	Swiss Open, Switzerland	250 Series	Clay	(Slovakia) Igor Zelenay	(Italy) Matteo Berrettini (Italy) Daniele Bracciali	6–7^{(2–7)}, 6–7^{(5–7)}
Win	1–1	Feb 2022	Open 13, France	250 Series	Hard (i)	(Russia) Andrey Rublev	(South Africa) Raven Klaasen (Japan) Ben McLachlan	4–6 7–5 [10–7]
Win	2–1	Oct 2023	Stockholm Open, Sweden	250 Series	Hard (i)	(Kazakhstan) Andrey Golubev	(India) Yuki Bhambri (United Kingdom) Julian Cash	7–6^{(10–8)}, 6–2

== Challenger and Futures finals ==
=== Singles: 26 (15–11) ===
Legend (singles) ATP Challenger Tour (0–0) ITF Futures Tour (15–11)	Titles by surface Hard (13–8) Clay (2–3) Grass (0–0) Carpet (0–0)

Result	W–L	Date	Tournament	Tier	Surface	Opponent	Score
Loss	0–1	Jun 2008	Ukraine F2, Cherkassy	Futures	Clay	(Italy) Luca Vanni	4–6, 3–6
Loss	0–2	Jun 2008	Ukraine F3, Illichevsk	Futures	Clay	(Russia) Evgeny Donskoy	7–6^{(12–10)}, 6–7^{(5–7)}, 4–6
Win	1–2	May 2009	Poland F2, Kraków	Futures	Clay	(Poland) Błażej Koniusz	6–3, 6–2
Loss	1–3	Sep 2009	Turkey F9, Istanbul	Futures	Hard	(Belarus) Uladzimir Ignatik	2–6, 2–6
Loss	1–4	May 2010	Uzbekistan F2, Namangan	Futures	Hard	(Russia) Alexander Kudryavtsev	4–6, 4–6
Loss	1–5	Jun 2010	Slovenia F2, Rogaška Slatina	Futures	Clay	(Croatia) Nikola Mektić	3–6, 2–4 ret.
Loss	1–6	Oct 2010	Turkey F11, Antalya	Futures	Hard	(Moldova) Radu Albot	3–6, 6–4, 5–7
Loss	1–7	Feb 2011	Turkey F5, Antalya	Futures	Hard	(Germany) Cedrik-Marcel Stebe	4–6, 3–6
Win	2–7	May 2011	Turkey F17, Adana	Futures	Clay	(Spain) Carlos Calderón Rodríguez	6–3, 6–0
Win	3–7	May 2011	Turkey F18, Samsun	Futures	Hard	(Belgium) Alexandre Folie	7–5, 7–6^{(7–5)}
Win	4–7	May 2011	Turkey F19, Antalya	Futures	Hard	(Greece) Paris Gemouchidis	6–0, 7–5
Loss	4–8	Aug 2011	Kazakhstan F4, Almaty	Futures	Hard	(Tunisia) Malek Jaziri	3–6, 2–6
Loss	4–9	Oct 2012	Kazakhstan F8, Almaty	Futures	Hard (i)	(Poland) Marcin Gawron	5–7, 4–6
Win	5–9	Oct 2012	Kazakhstan F9, Astana	Futures	Hard (i)	(Russia) Alexander Rumyantsev	6–4, 6–4
Win	6–9	Mar 2014	Russia F2, Yoshkar-Ola	Futures	Hard (i)	(Russia) Mikhail Biryukov	6–4, 6–0
Win	7–9	Apr 2014	Uzbekistan F2, Namangan	Futures	Hard	(Ukraine) Volodymyr Uzhylovskyi	6–3, 7–6^{(7–2)}
Win	8–9	May 2014	Uzbekistan F3, Andijan	Futures	Hard	(Russia) Richard Muzaev	6–1, 6–2
Win	9–9	Jun 2014	Ukraine F8, Petrovske	Futures	Hard	(Ukraine) Vladyslav Manafov	6–1, 2–0 ret.
Win	10–9	Jun 2014	Ukraine F9, Petrovske	Futures	Hard	(France) Sébastien Boltz	7–5, 6–2
Win	11–9	Aug 2014	Kazakhstan F9, Astana	Futures	Hard	(Chinese Taipei) Chen Ti	6–3, 6–4
Win	12–9	Jun 2015	Uzbekistan F3, Andijan	Futures	Hard	(Serbia) Nikola Milojević	2–6, 7–6^{(7–3)}, 6–4
Win	13–9	Aug 2015	Belarus F1, Minsk	Futures	Hard	(Belarus) Egor Gerasimov	6–4, 7–5
Win	14–9	Nov 2015	Egypt F40, Sharm El Sheikh	Futures	Hard	(Bosnia and Herzegovina) Aldin Šetkić	4–6, 6–4, 6–2
Loss	14–10	Nov 2015	Egypt F41, Sharm El Sheikh	Futures	Hard	(Bosnia and Herzegovina) Aldin Šetkić	2–6, 3–6
Win	15–10	Dec 2015	Egypt F42, Sharm El Sheikh	Futures	Hard	(Poland) Mikołaj Jędruszczak	6–1, 6–2
Loss	15–11	Feb 2018	Kazakhstan F1, Aktobe	Futures	Hard (i)	(Russia) Mikhail Fufygin	6–4, 3–6, 4–6

=== Doubles: 120 (72–48) ===
Legend (doubles) ATP Challenger Tour (42–36) ITF Futures Tour (30–12)	Titles by surface Hard (41–23) Clay (30–25) Grass (0–0) Carpet (1–0)

Result	W–L	Date	Tournament	Tier	Surface	Partner	Opponents	Score
Loss	0–1	May 2006	Ukraine F1, Illyichevsk	Futures	Clay	(Ukraine) Alexandr Dolgopolov	(Germany) Bastian Knittel (Germany) Alexander Satschko	4–6, 3–6
Loss	0–2	Jul 2006	Romania F10, Focșani	Futures	Clay	(Romania) Bogdan-Victor Leonte	(Romania) Teodor-Dacian Crăciun (Romania) Victor Ioniță	6–7^{(3–7)}, 5–7
Win	1–2	Aug 2006	Romania F15, Craiova	Futures	Clay	(Ukraine) Oleksandr Nedovyesov	(Romania) Cătălin-Ionuț Gârd (Romania) Marcel-Ioan Miron	6–4, 6–1
Win	2–2	Aug 2006	Romania F16, Arad	Futures	Clay	(Ukraine) Oleksandr Nedovyesov	(Romania) Adrian Cruciat (Romania) Marcel-Ioan Miron	6–4, 6–2
Win	3–2	Jun 2007	Ukraine F1, Cherkassy	Futures	Clay	(Moldova) Andrei Gorban	(Belarus) Sergey Betov (Ukraine) Vladyslav Klymenko	5–7, 6–3, 6–2
Win	4–2	Aug 2007	Russia F4, Moscow	Futures	Clay	(Russia) Alexander Krasnorutskiy	(Russia) Artem Sitak (Russia) Dmitri Sitak	6–4, 6–2
Loss	4–3	Sep 2007	Russia F7, Balashikha	Futures	Clay	(Ukraine) Vladyslav Klymenko	(Russia) Mikhail Elgin (Russia) Vladimir Karusevich	6–7^{(3–7)}, 6–4, [8–10]
Loss	4–4	Dec 2007	Israel F5, Ramat HaSharon	Futures	Hard	(Belarus) Sergey Betov	(Israel) Amir Hadad (Israel) Harel Levy	7–6^{(9–7)}, 4–6, [3–10]
Win	5–4	Jan 2008	Portugal F1, Albufeira	Futures	Hard	(Canada) Érik Chvojka	(Netherlands) Bas van der Valk (Netherlands) Boy Westerhof	6–4, 5–7, [14–12]
Win	6–4	Mar 2008	Ivory Coast F2, Abidjan	Futures	Hard	(Netherlands) Boy Westerhof	(Ukraine) Ivan Anikanov (Germany) Alexander Satschko	7–6^{(7–4)}, 7–6^{(7–3)}
Win	7–4	Jun 2008	Ukraine F2, Cherkassy	Futures	Clay	(Ukraine) Artem Smirnov	(Russia) Ilya Belyaev (Russia) Sergei Krotiouk	7–6^{(7–4)}, 6–4
Win	8–4	Jun 2008	Ukraine F3, Illichevsk	Futures	Clay	(Ukraine) Artem Smirnov	(Russia) Evgeny Donskoy (Russia) Victor Kozin	6–3, 6–7^{(3–7)}, [12–10]
Loss	8–5	Aug 2008	Russia F4, Moscow	Futures	Clay	(Russia) Alexander Krasnorutskiy	(Ukraine) Alexandr Dolgopolov (Ukraine) Artem Smirnov	0–6, 6–3, [8–10]
Win	9–5	Aug 2008	Almaty, Kazakhstan	Challenger	Clay	(Russia) Alexander Krasnorutskiy	(Kazakhstan) Syrym Abdukhalikov (United States) Alex Bogomolov Jr.	3–6, 6–3, [10–2]
Loss	9–6	Nov 2008	United Arab Emirates F1, Dubai	Futures	Hard	(Kazakhstan) Alexey Kedryuk	(Switzerland) Marco Chiudinelli (Slovakia) Ivo Klec	1–6, 6–2, [6–10]
Win	10–6	Nov 2008	United Arab Emirates F2, Fujairah	Futures	Hard	(Ukraine) Ivan Sergeyev	(Denmark) Thomas Kromann (Sweden) Filip Prpic	2–6, 7–5, [10–5]
Loss	10–7	May 2009	Poland F2, Kraków	Futures	Clay	(Belarus) Uladzimir Ignatik	(Germany) Martin Emmrich (Chile) Hans Podlipnik Castillo	4–6, 6–7^{(5–7)}
Win	11–7	May 2009	Slovenia F3, Koper	Futures	Clay	(Canada) Milos Raonic	(Czech Republic) Roman Jebavý (Czech Republic) David Novák	7–5, 5–7, [10–5]
Win	12–7	Aug 2009	Almaty, Kazakhstan	Challenger	Hard	(Chinese Taipei) Yang Tsung-hua	(Canada) Pierre-Ludovic Duclos (Kazakhstan) Alexey Kedryuk	4–6, 7–6^{(7–5)}, [11–9]
Loss	12–8	Sep 2009	Turkey F8, Istanbul	Futures	Hard	(Czech Republic) Pavel Šnobel	(Kazakhstan) Alexey Kedryuk (Japan) Junn Mitsuhashi	6–2, 3–6, [8–10]
Loss	12–9	Sep 2009	Turkey F9, Istanbul	Futures	Hard	(Czech Republic) Pavel Šnobel	(Kazakhstan) Alexey Kedryuk (Japan) Junn Mitsuhashi	3–6, 6–7^{(6–8)}
Loss	12–10	Mar 2010	Kazakhstan F2, Almaty	Futures	Hard (i)	(Kazakhstan) Alexey Kedryuk	(Russia) Evgeny Kirillov (Russia) Alexander Kudryavtsev	5–7, 4–6
Win	13–10	Apr 2010	Uzbekistan F1, Andijan	Futures	Hard	(Russia) Alexander Kudryavtsev	(Russia) Mikhail Elgin (Kazakhstan) Alexey Kedryuk	6–2, 6–1
Loss	13–11	Aug 2010	Saransk, Russia	Challenger	Clay	(Ukraine) Artem Smirnov	(Russia) Ilya Belyaev (Russia) Mikhail Elgin	6–3, 6–7^{(6–8)}, [9–11]
Win	14–11	Oct 2010	Turkey F11, Antalya	Futures	Hard	(Slovakia) Kamil Čapkovič	(Turkey) Barış Ergüden (Denmark) Philip Orno	6–4, 7–6^{(7–1)}
Win	15–11	Jan 2011	Turkey F1, Antalya	Futures	Hard	(Ukraine) Artem Smirnov	(Croatia) Marin Draganja (Croatia) Dino Marcan	6–2, 6–2
Win	16–11	Feb 2011	Turkey F4, Antalya	Futures	Hard	(Belarus) Sergey Betov	(Czech Republic) Michal Konečný (South Africa) Ruan Roelofse	6–4, 6–1
Win	17–11	Mar 2011	Turkey F8, Antalya	Futures	Hard	(Moldova) Radu Albot	(Czech Republic) Roman Jebavý (Slovakia) Adrian Sikora	6–7^{(3–7)}, 6–3, [12–10]
Loss	17–12	May 2011	Turkey F16, Tarsus	Futures	Clay	(Russia) Mikhail Vasiliev	(Spain) Carlos Calderón Rodríguez (Spain) Marc Giner	w/o
Win	18–12	May 2011	Turkey F18, Samsun	Futures	Hard	(Moldova) Andrei Ciumac	(Republic of Ireland) Sam Barry (Republic of Ireland) Barry King	7–6^{(7–3)}, 2–6, [10–8]
Win	19–12	May 2011	Turkey F19, Antalya	Futures	Hard	(Moldova) Andrei Ciumac	(Republic of Ireland) Daniel Glancy (Republic of Ireland) Barry King	7–5, 7–6^{(7–3)}
Win	20–12	Jun 2011	Spain F20, Martos	Futures	Hard	(Finland) Harri Heliövaara	(Russia) Ilya Belyaev (Canada) Steven Diez	6–3, 6–4
Loss	20–13	Jul 2011	Pozoblanco, Spain	Challenger	Hard	(Ukraine) Illya Marchenko	(Russia) Mikhail Elgin (Russia) Alexander Kudryavtsev	w/o
Win	21–13	Jul 2011	Astana, Kazakhstan	Challenger	Hard (i)	(Russia) Konstantin Kravchuk	(Spain) Arnau Brugués Davi (Tunisia) Malek Jaziri	7–6^{(7–4)}, 6–7^{(1–7)}, [10–3]
Win	22–13	Aug 2011	Kazakhstan F5, Astana	Futures	Hard	(Czech Republic) Roman Jebavý	(Russia) Vitali Reshetnikov (Russia) Ilia Starkov	6–4, 6–4
Loss	22–14	Aug 2011	Karshi, Uzbekistan	Challenger	Hard	(Russia) Konstantin Kravchuk	(Russia) Mikhail Elgin (Russia) Alexander Kudryavtsev	6–3, 3–6, [9–11]
Loss	22–15	Aug 2011	Astana, Kazakhstan	Challenger	Hard (i)	(Finland) Harri Heliövaara	(India) Karan Rastogi (India) Vishnu Vardhan	6–7^{(3–7)}, 6–2, [8–10]
Win	23–15	Sep 2011	Tashkent, Uzbekistan	Challenger	Hard	(Finland) Harri Heliövaara	(United States) John Paul Fruttero (South Africa) Raven Klaasen	7–6^{(7–5)}, 7–6^{(7–3)}
Win	24–15	Apr 2012	Mersin, Turkey	Challenger	Clay	(Moldova) Radu Albot	(Italy) Alessandro Motti (Italy) Simone Vagnozzi	6–0, 6–2
Loss	24–16	Jul 2012	Braunschweig, Germany	Challenger	Clay	(Finland) Harri Heliövaara	(Poland) Tomasz Bednarek (Poland) Mateusz Kowalczyk	5–7, 7–6^{(7–1)}, [8–10]
Win	25–16	Jul 2012	Astana, Kazakhstan	Challenger	Hard (i)	(Russia) Konstantin Kravchuk	(Slovakia) Karol Beck (Slovakia) Kamil Čapkovič	6–4, 6–3
Win	26–16	Aug 2012	Pozoblanco, Spain	Challenger	Hard	(Russia) Konstantin Kravchuk	(France) Adrian Mannarino (France) Maxime Teixeira	6–3, 6–3
Win	27–16	Sep 2012	Lermontov, Russia	Challenger	Clay	(Russia) Konstantin Kravchuk	(Kazakhstan) Andrey Golubev (Kazakhstan) Yuriy Schukin	6–3, 6–4
Win	28–16	Oct 2012	Kazakhstan F8, Almaty	Futures	Hard (i)	(Germany) Jaan-Frederik Brunken	(Poland) Marcin Gawron (Poland) Andriej Kapaś	3–6, 6–0, [10–7]
Loss	28–17	Nov 2012	Tyumen, Russia	Challenger	Hard (i)	(Russia) Konstantin Kravchuk	(Slovakia) Ivo Klec (Sweden) Andreas Siljeström	3–6, 2–6
Win	29–17	Apr 2013	Savannah, USA	Challenger	Clay	(Russia) Teymuraz Gabashvili	(United States) Michael Russell (United States) Tim Smyczek	6–2, 7–5
Loss	29–18	Feb 2014	Bergamo, Italy	Challenger	Hard (i)	(Russia) Konstantin Kravchuk	(Slovakia) Karol Beck (Slovakia) Michal Mertiňák	6–4, 5–7, [6–10]
Win	30–18	Mar 2014	Russia F2, Yoshkar-Ola	Futures	Hard (i)	(Russia) Mikhail Biryukov	(Russia) Denis Matsukevich (Russia) Stanislav Vovk	7–6^{(7–5)}, 6–7^{(11–13)}, [10–5]
Win	31–18	May 2014	Uzbekistan F3, Andijan	Futures	Hard	(Russia) Denis Matsukevich	(Kyrgyzstan) Daniiar Duldaev (Ukraine) Volodymyr Uzhylovskyi	7–5, 7–5
Win	32–18	Jun 2014	Ukraine F9, Petrovske	Futures	Hard	(Ukraine) Sergey Bubka	(Ukraine) Olexiy Kolisnyk (Ukraine) Alexander Lebedyn	6–3, 6–2
Win	33–18	Nov 2014	Brescia, Italy	Challenger	Carpet (i)	(Ukraine) Illya Marchenko	(Czech Republic) Roman Jebavý (Poland) Błażej Koniusz	7–6^{(7–4)}, 6–3
Win	34–18	Feb 2015	Dallas, USA	Challenger	Hard (i)	(Russia) Andrey Rublev	(Mexico) Hans Hach (Mexico) Luis Patiño	6–4, 7–6^{(7–5)}
Win	35–18	Jun 2015	Uzbekistan F3, Andijan	Futures	Hard	(Russia) Denis Matsukevich	(Russia) Markos Kalovelonis (Uzbekistan) Shonigmatjon Shofayziyev	3–6, 7–6^{(7–5)}, [14–12]
Loss	35–19	Jun 2015	Fergana, Uzbekistan	Challenger	Hard	(Croatia) Franko Škugor	(Belarus) Sergey Betov (Russia) Mikhail Elgin	3–6, 5–7
Win	36–19	Aug 2015	Astana, Kazakhstan	Challenger	Hard	(Russia) Konstantin Kravchuk	(South Korea) Chung Yun-seong (Uzbekistan) Jurabek Karimov	6–2, 6–2
Win	37–19	Aug 2015	Segovia, Spain	Challenger	Hard	(Russia) Alexander Kudryavtsev	(Belarus) Aliaksandr Bury (Sweden) Andreas Siljeström	6–2, 6–4
Win	38–19	Sep 2015	Russia F7, Vsevolozhsk	Futures	Clay	(Belarus) Yaraslav Shyla	(Kazakhstan) Alexander Bublik (Russia) Richard Muzaev	6–2, 7–6^{(7–3)}
Loss	38–20	Sep 2015	İzmir, Turkey	Challenger	Hard	(Tunisia) Malek Jaziri	(India) Saketh Myneni (India) Divij Sharan	6–7^{(5–7)}, 6–4, [1–0] ret.
Win	39–20	Oct 2015	Ağrı, Turkey	Challenger	Hard	(Russia) Konstantin Kravchuk	(Russia) Alexander Igoshin (Belarus) Yaraslav Shyla	6–3, 7–6^{(7–4)}
Win	40–20	Nov 2015	Suzhou, China, P.R.	Challenger	Hard	(Chinese Taipei) Lee Hsin-han	(China) Gong Maoxin (Chinese Taipei) Peng Hsien-yin	3–6, 7–6^{(7–5)}, [10–4]
Loss	40–21	Jan 2016	Happy Valley, Australia	Challenger	Hard	(Kazakhstan) Aleksandr Nedovyesov	(Italy) Matteo Donati (Kazakhstan) Andrey Golubev	6–3, 6–7^{(5–7)}, [1–10]
Win	41–21	Mar 2016	Guangzhou, China, P.R.	Challenger	Hard	(Russia) Alexander Kudryavtsev	(Thailand) Sanchai Ratiwatana (Thailand) Sonchat Ratiwatana	6–2, 6–2
Win	42–21	Apr 2016	Ra'anana, Israel	Challenger	Hard	(Russia) Konstantin Kravchuk	(Israel) Jonathan Erlich (Austria) Philipp Oswald	4–6, 7–6^{(7–1)}, [10–4]
Loss	42–22	Apr 2016	Nanjing, China, P.R.	Challenger	Clay	(Kazakhstan) Aleksandr Nedovyesov	(India) Saketh Myneni (India) Jeevan Nedunchezhiyan	3–6, 3–6
Loss	42–23	May 2016	Anning, China, P.R.	Challenger	Clay	(Kazakhstan) Aleksandr Nedovyesov	(China) Bai Yan (Italy) Riccardo Ghedin	6–4, 3–6, [6–10]
Win	43–23	Oct 2016	Ukraine F5, Kyiv	Futures	Hard	(Ukraine) Igor Karpovets	(Ukraine) Oleg Prihodko (Ukraine) Daniil Zarichanskyy	6–4, 6–3
Loss	43–24	Mar 2017	Wrocław, Poland	Challenger	Hard (i)	(Russia) Mikhail Elgin	(Canada) Adil Shamasdin (Belarus) Andrei Vasilevski	3–6, 6–3, [19–21]
Win	44–24	Mar 2017	Egypt F9, Sharm El Sheikh	Futures	Hard	(Ukraine) Artem Smirnov	(South Africa) Lloyd Harris (South Africa) Nicolaas Scholtz	w/o
Win	45–24	Mar 2017	Egypt F10, Sharm El Sheikh	Futures	Hard	(Ukraine) Artem Smirnov	(Netherlands) Gijs Brouwer (Netherlands) Jelle Sels	6–1, 6–2
Win	46–24	May 2017	Karshi, Uzbekistan	Challenger	Hard	(Ukraine) Sergiy Stakhovsky	(Germany) Kevin Krawietz (Spain) Adrián Menéndez Maceiras	6–4, 7–6^{(9–7)}
Loss	46–25	Jun 2017	Caltanissetta, Italy	Challenger	Clay	(Croatia) Franko Škugor	(United States) James Cerretani (United States) Max Schnur	3–6, 6–3, [6–10]
Loss	46–26	Sep 2017	Ukraine F4, Kyiv	Futures	Clay	(Ukraine) Vladyslav Manafov	(Ukraine) Artem Smirnov (Ukraine) Volodymyr Uzhylovskyi	5–7, 2–6
Win	47–26	Sep 2017	Ukraine F5, Kremenchuk	Futures	Clay	(Ukraine) Vladyslav Manafov	(Ukraine) Dmytro Kamynin (Ukraine) Daniil Zarichanskyy	5–7, 6–4, [10–8]
Loss	47–27	Sep 2017	İzmir, Turkey	Challenger	Hard	(Ukraine) Sergiy Stakhovsky	(United Kingdom) Scott Clayton (United Kingdom) Jonny O'Mara	w/o
Win	48–27	Feb 2018	Kazakhstan F2, Shymkent	Futures	Hard (i)	(Ukraine) Vladyslav Manafov	(Estonia) Vladimir Ivanov (Russia) Evgenii Tiurnev	7–6^{(7–4)}, 3–6, [10–6]
Win	49–27	Mar 2018	Zhuhai, China, P.R.	Challenger	Hard	(Slovakia) Igor Zelenay	(Belarus) Aliaksandr Bury (Chinese Taipei) Peng Hsien-yin	7–5, 7–6^{(7–4)}
Loss	49–28	Mar 2018	Shenzhen, China, P.R.	Challenger	Hard	(Slovakia) Igor Zelenay	(Chinese Taipei) Hsieh Cheng-peng (Australia) Rameez Junaid	6–7^{(3–7)}, 3–6
Win	50–28	Apr 2018	Barletta, Italy	Challenger	Clay	(Slovakia) Igor Zelenay	(Uruguay) Ariel Behar (Argentina) Máximo González	6–1, 6–2
Win	51–28	Apr 2018	Tunis, Tunisia	Challenger	Clay	(Slovakia) Igor Zelenay	(France) Jonathan Eysseric (United Kingdom) Joe Salisbury	7–6^{(7–4)}, 6–2
Win	52–28	Jun 2018	Prostějov, Czech Republic	Challenger	Clay	(Slovakia) Igor Zelenay	(Uruguay) Pablo Cuevas (Uruguay) Martín Cuevas	4–6, 6–3, [10–7]
Win	53–28	Aug 2018	Cordenons, Italy	Challenger	Clay	(Slovakia) Igor Zelenay	(Slovakia) Andrej Martin (Spain) Daniel Muñoz de la Nava	3–6, 6–3, [11–9]
Win	54–28	Nov 2018	Bratislava, Slovakia	Challenger	Hard (i)	(Slovakia) Igor Zelenay	(India) Ramkumar Ramanathan (Belarus) Andrei Vasilevski	6–2, 3–6, [11–9]
Win	55–28	Apr 2019	Barletta, Italy	Challenger	Clay	(Slovakia) Igor Zelenay	(Bosnia and Herzegovina) Tomislav Brkić (Croatia) Tomislav Draganja	7–6^{(7–1)}, 6–4
Win	56–28	Apr 2019	Francavilla, Italy	Challenger	Clay	(Slovakia) Igor Zelenay	(Argentina) Guillermo Durán (Spain) David Vega Hernández	6–3, 6–2
Win	57–28	Oct 2019	Brest, France	Challenger	Hard (i)	(Belarus) Andrei Vasilevski	(Italy) Andrea Vavassori (Spain) David Vega Hernández	6–3, 6–1
Win	58–28	Jan 2020	Bendigo, Australia	Challenger	Hard	(Serbia) Nikola Ćaćić	(El Salvador) Marcelo Arévalo (United Kingdom) Jonny O'Mara	7–6^{(7–3)}, 6–4
Win	59–28	Jan 2021	Antalya, Turkey	Challenger	Clay	(Kazakhstan) Aleksandr Nedovyesov	(Venezuela) Luis David Martínez (Spain) David Vega Hernández	3–6, 6–4, [18–16]
Win	60–28	Feb 2021	Antalya, Turkey	Challenger	Clay	(Kazakhstan) Aleksandr Nedovyesov	(United States) Robert Galloway (United States) Alex Lawson	6–4, 7–6^{(7–2)}
Win	61–28	Feb 2021	Nur-Sultan, Kazakhstan	Challenger	Hard (i)	(Kazakhstan) Aleksandr Nedovyesov	(United States) Nathan Pasha (United States) Max Schnur	6–4, 6–4
Loss	61–29	Mar 2021	Biella, Italy	Challenger	Hard (i)	(Ukraine) Sergiy Stakhovsky	(France) Quentin Halys (France) Tristan Lamasine	1–6, 0–2 ret.
Loss	61–30	Mar 2021	Biella, Italy	Challenger	Hard (i)	(Ukraine) Sergiy Stakhovsky	(United Kingdom) Lloyd Glasspool (Australia) Matt Reid	3–6, 4–6
Loss	61–31	March 2021	Lugano, Switzerland	Challenger	Hard (i)	(Ukraine) Sergiy Stakhovsky	(Germany) Andre Begemann (Italy) Andrea Vavassori	6–7^{(11–13)}, 6–4, [8–10]
Win	62–31	June 2021	Bratislava, Slovakia	Challenger	Clay	(Kazakhstan) Aleksandr Nedovyesov	(Netherlands) Sander Arends (Venezuela) Luis David Martínez	7–6^{(7–5)}, 6–1
Loss	62–32	Aug 2021	Lüdenscheid, Germany	Challenger	Clay	(Kazakhstan) Aleksandr Nedovyesov	(Croatia) Ivan Sabanov (Croatia) Matej Sabanov	4–6, 6–2, [10–12]
Loss	62–33	Sep 2021	Kyiv, Ukraine	Challenger	Clay	(Ukraine) Sergiy Stakhovsky	(Brazil) Orlando Luz (Kazakhstan) Aleksandr Nedovyesov	4–6, 4–6
Win	63–33	Oct 2021	Alicante, Spain	Challenger	Hard	(Spain) David Vega Hernández	(Monaco) Romain Arneodo (Australia) Matt Reid	6–4, 6–2
Loss	63–34	Nov 2021	Bratislava, Slovakia	Challenger	Hard (i)	(Kazakhstan) Aleksandr Nedovyesov	(Slovakia) Filip Horanský (Ukraine) Sergiy Stakhovsky	4–6, 4–6
Loss	63–35	June 2022	Parma, Italy	Challenger	Clay	(Slovakia) Igor Zelenay	(Italy) Luciano Darderi (Brazil) Fernando Romboli	2–6, 3–6
Win	64–35	Nov 2022	Bratislava, Slovakia	Challenger	Hard (i)	(Kazakhstan) Aleksandr Nedovyesov	(Czech Republic) Petr Nouza (Czech Republic) Andrew Paulson	4–6, 6–4, [10–6]
Loss	64–36	Feb 2023	Koblenz, Germany	Challenger	Hard (i)	(France) Jonathan Eysseric	(Germany) Fabian Fallert (Germany) Hendrik Jebens	6–7^{(2–7)}, 3–6
Loss	64–37	Apr 2023	Barletta, Italy	Challenger	Clay	(Czech Republic) Zdeněk Kolář	(Italy) Jacopo Berrettini (Italy) Flavio Cobolli	6–1, 5–7, [6–10]
Loss	64–38	Apr 2023	Rome, Italy	Challenger	Clay	(Kazakhstan) Andrey Golubev	(Colombia) Nicolás Barrientos (Portugal) Francisco Cabral	3–6, 1–6
Win	65–38	May 2023	Turin, Italy	Challenger	Clay (Note: The final itself was played on indoor hard due to rain.)	(Kazakhstan) Andrey Golubev	(United States) Nathaniel Lammons (Australia) John Peers	7–6^{(7–4)}, 6–7^{(6–8)}, [10–5]
Win	65–38	Jul 2023	Milan, Italy	Challenger	Clay	(France) Jonathan Eysseric	(France) Théo Arribagé (France) Luca Sanchez	6–2, 6–4
Win	67–38	Jul 2023	Salzburg, Austria	Challenger	Clay	(Kazakhstan) Andrey Golubev	(India) Anirudh Chandrasekar (India) Vijay Sundar Prashanth	6–4, 7–6^{(10–8)}
Loss	67–39	Aug 2023	Banja Luka, Bosnia and Herzegovina	Challenger	Clay	(Kazakhstan) Andrey Golubev	(Romania) Victor Vlad Cornea (Austria) Philipp Oswald	6–3, 1–6, [13–15]
Loss	67–40	Oct 2023	Bratislava, Slovakia	Challenger	Hard (i)	(Kazakhstan) Andrey Golubev	(India) Sriram Balaji (Germany) Andre Begemann	3–6, 7–5, [8–10]
Loss	67–41	Mar 2024	Székesfehérvár, Hungary	Challenger	Clay (i)	(Sweden) André Göransson	(France) Titouan Droguet (France) Matteo Martineau	6–4, 5–7, [8–10]
Loss	67–42	Jul 2024	Lüdenscheid, Germany	Challenger	Clay	(Netherlands) Matwé Middelkoop	(Netherlands) David Pel (Netherlands) Bart Stevens	4–6, 6–2, [8–10]
Win	68–42	Aug 2024	Como, Italy	Challenger	Clay	(Romania) Victor Vlad Cornea	(Romania) Alexandru Jecan (Belarus) Ivan Liutarevich	6–2, 6–3
Loss	68–43	Jan 2025	Oeiras, Portugal	Challenger	Hard (i)	(Netherlands) Matwé Middelkoop	(Canada) Liam Draxl (Canada) Cleeve Harper	6–1, 5–7, [6–10]
Loss	68–44	Mar 2025	Zadar, Croatia	Challenger	Clay	(Netherlands) Mick Veldheer	(Czech Republic) Zdeněk Kolář (Austria) Neil Oberleitner	3–6, 4–6
Win	69–44	May 2025	Prague, Czech Republic	Challenger	Clay	(Czech Republic) Matěj Vocel	(Austria) David Pichler (Austria) Jurij Rodionov	7–6^{(7–3)}, 6–3
Win	70–44	Sep 2025	Szczecin, Poland	Challenger	Clay	(Austria) David Pichler	Ivan Liutarevich (Spain) Bruno Pujol Navarro	3–6, 7–6^{(7–1)}, [10–6]
Loss	70–45	Jun 2026	Brașov, Romania	Challenger	Clay	(Spain) Íñigo Cervantes	(Austria) Maximilian Neuchrist (Czech Republic) Michael Vrbenský	3–6, 6–3, [4–10]
Win	71–45	Jul 2026	Liberec, Czech Republic	Challenger	Clay	(Spain) Íñigo Cervantes	(Austria) Maximilian Neuchrist (Czech Republic) David Poljak	7–6^{(9–7)}, 6–3
Loss	71–46	Aug 2026	Grodzisk Mazowiecki, Poland	Challenger	Hard	(Spain) Íñigo Cervantes	(Morocco) Younes Lalami (Poland) Filip Pieczonka	0–6, 4–6
Loss	71–47	Sep 2026	Sevilla, Spain	Challenger	Clay	(Spain) Íñigo Cervantes	(Colombia) Nicolás Barrientos (Argentina) Mariano Kestelboim	6–7^{(3–7)}, 3–6
Loss	71–48	Sep 2026	Szczecin, Poland	Challenger	Clay	(Spain) Íñigo Cervantes	(Czech Republic) Andrew Paulson (Portugal) Tiago Pereira	2–6, 0–6
Win	72–48	Sep 2026	Genoa, Italy	Challenger	Clay	(Spain) Íñigo Cervantes	(Finland) Patrik Niklas-Salminen (Czech Republic) Michael Vrbenský	6–2, 6–7^{(6–8)}, [10–7]
