= 2021 Antalya Challenger III =

- Date: 29 November – 5 December
- Edition: 3rd
- Surface: Clay
- Location: Antalya, Turkey

Champions

Singles
- (Portugal) Nuno Borges

Doubles
- (Italy) Riccardo Bonadio / (Italy) Giovanni Fonio
- Antalya Challenger

The 2021 Antalya Challenger III was a professional tennis tournament played on clay courts. It was the third edition of the tournament which was part of the 2021 ATP Challenger Tour. It took place in Antalya, Turkey between 29 November and 5 December 2021.

== Singles main-draw entrants ==
=== Seeds ===
| Country | Player | Rank^{1} | Seed |
|---|---|---|---|
| TUR | Cem İlkel | 145 | 1 |
| IND | Ramkumar Ramanathan | 222 | 2 |
| POR | João Domingues | 245 | 3 |
| CRO | Duje Ajduković | 247 | 4 |
| TPE | Tseng Chun-hsin | 251 | 5 |
| POR | Nuno Borges | 262 | 6 |
| FRA | Geoffrey Blancaneaux | 280 | 7 |
| POR | Gonçalo Oliveira | 288 | 8 |

- ^{1} Rankings as of 22 November 2021.

=== Other entrants ===
The following players received wildcards into the singles main draw:

- (Turkey) Yankı Erel
- (Turkey) Cem İlkel
- (Georgia (country)) Aleksandre Metreveli

The following players received entry into the singles main draw as alternates:

- (Chinese Taipei) Hsu Yu-hsiou
- (South Korea) Lee Duck-hee

The following players received entry from the qualifying draw:

- (Portugal) Tiago Cação
- (United States) Oliver Crawford
- (Netherlands) Mick Veldheer
- (Germany) Louis Wessels

== Champions ==
=== Singles ===
- (Portugal) Nuno Borges def. (United Kingdom) Ryan Peniston 6–4, 6–3.

=== Doubles ===
- (Italy) Riccardo Bonadio / (Italy) Giovanni Fonio def. (Chinese Taipei) Hsu Yu-hsiou / (Chinese Taipei) Tseng Chun-hsin 3–6, 6–2, [12–10].
