= Giovanni Fonio =

Italian tennis player

- Country (sports): Italy
- Residence: Novara, Italy
- Born: 7 May 1998 (age 28) Novara, Italy
- Height: 1.83 m (6 ft 0 in)
- Plays: Right-handed (one-handed backhand)
- Coach: Pietro Rondoni, Matteo Sacchi
- Prize money: US $213,469

Singles
- Career record: 0–0
- Career titles: 0 Challenger, 4 Futures
- Highest ranking: No. 269 (29 January 2024)
- Current ranking: No. 1,662 (26 October 2026)

Doubles
- Career record: 0–0
- Career titles: 2 Challenger, 4 Futures
- Highest ranking: No. 406 (15 January 2024)
- Current ranking: No. 1,678 (26 October 2026)
- Last updated on: 26 October 2026.

Giovanni Fonio (born 7 May 1998) is an Italian tennis player. He has a career high ATP singles ranking of world No. 269 achieved on 29 January 2024. He also has a career high doubles ranking of No. 406 achieved on 15 January 2024.

== Career ==
Fonio has won 2 ATP Challenger doubles title: at the 2021 Antalya Challenger III with Riccardo Bonadio and at the 2023 Internazionali di Tennis del Friuli Venezia Giulia with Francesco Forti.

In May 2022, at the qualifiers at the Internazionali d’Italia he lost to Emil Ruusuvuori.

On 30 November 2023, at the Yokkaichi Challenger in Japan, he defeated the then top 100 player Yosuke Watanuki in 3 sets.

== Challenger and Futures/World Tennis Tour Finals ==
=== Singles:7 (4-3) ===
Legend (singles) ATP Challenger Tour (0-0) ITF Futures/World Tennis Tour (4-3)	Titles by surface Hard (0–0) Clay (4-3) Grass (0–0) Carpet (0–0)

Result	W–L	Date	Tournament	Tier	Surface	Opponent	Score
Loss	0–1	Sep 2018	Italy F29, Santa Margherita di Pula	Futures	Clay	(Switzerland) Sandro Ehrat	5-7, 4-6
Loss	0–2	May 2019	M15, Bucharest, Romania	World Tennis Tour	Clay	(Spain) Albert Alcaraz Ivorra	6–3, 4–6, 1–6
Win	1-2	Feb 2020	M15, Antalya, Turkey	World Tennis Tour	Clay	(Czech Republic) Michael Vrbenský	4–6, 6–4, 6–3
Win	2-2	Feb 2021	M15, Antalya, Turkey	World Tennis Tour	Clay	(Argentina) Juan Manuel Cerundolo	W/0
Win	3-2	Mar 2021	M15, Opatija, Croatia	World Tennis Tour	Clay	(Italy) Giacomo Dambrosi	6-2, 6-3
Loss	3-3	Jun 2021	M15, Antalya, Turkey	World Tennis Tour	Clay	(United States) Nicolas Moreno de Alboran	5-7, 4-6
Win	4-3	Jan 2022	M15, Antalya, Turkey	World Tennis Tour	Clay	(Romania) Cezar Crețu	6-1, 6-4

=== Doubles: 2 (2-0) ===
Legend ATP Challenger (2–0) ITF Futures (0-0)	Finals by surface Hard (0–0) Clay (2-0) Grass (0–0) Carpet (0–0)

Result	W–L	Date	Tournament	Tier	Surface	Partner	Opponents	Score
Win	1-0	Dec 2021	Antalya, Turkey	Challenger	Clay	(Italy) Riccardo Bonadio	(South Korea) Hsu Yu-hsiou (South Korea) Tseng Chun-hsin	3–6, 6–2, [12–10]
Win	2-0	Aug 2023	Cordenons, Italy	Challenger	Clay	(Italy) Francesco Forti	(India) Niki Kaliyanda Poonacha (Australia) Adam Taylor	5–7, 6–1, [10–7]
