= Markos Kalovelonis =

Greek-Russian tennis player

Markos Kalovelonis Марк Георгиевич Каловелонис Μάρκος Καλοβελώνης
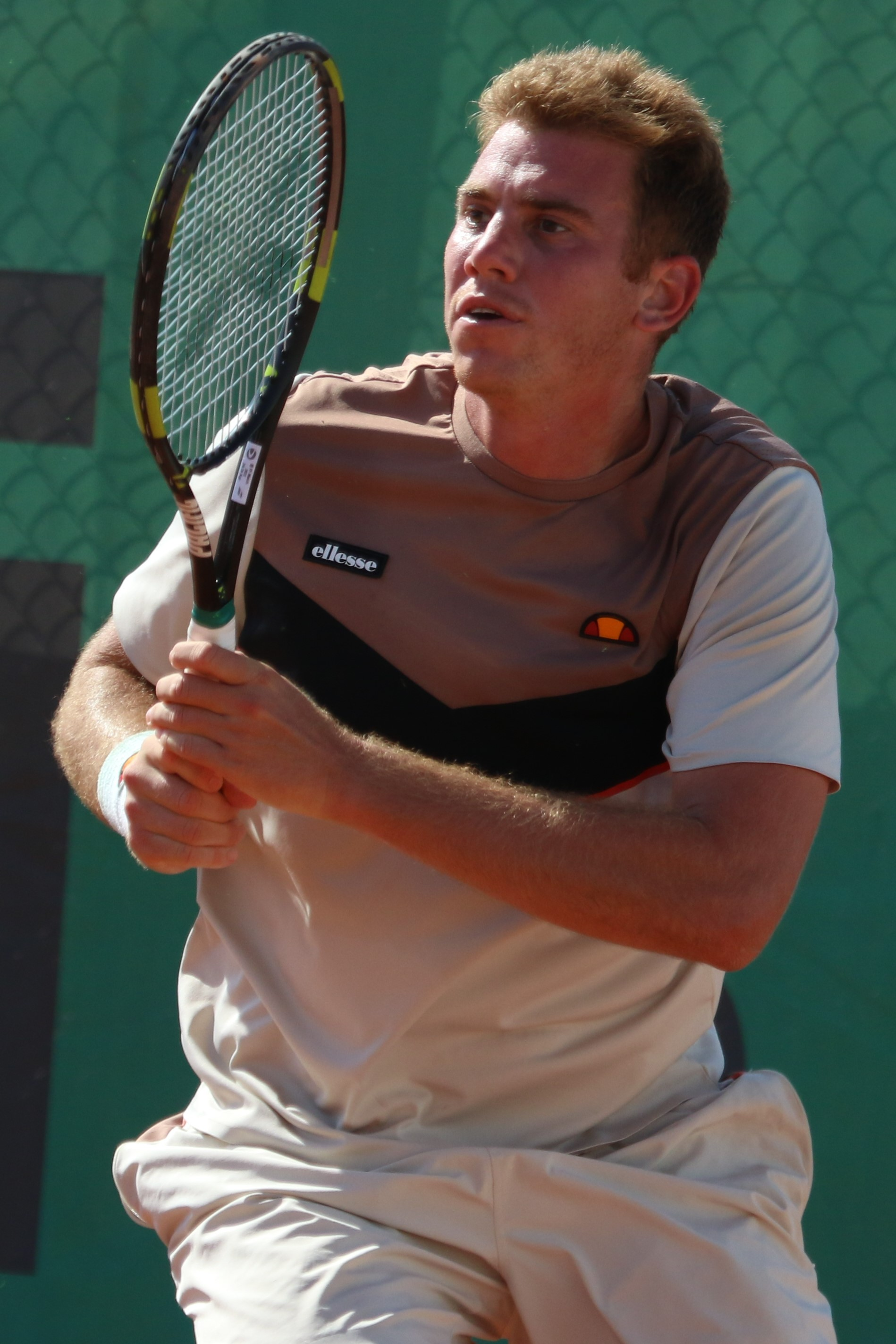
- Kalovelonis at the 2022 Internationaux de Tennis de Blois
- Country (sports): Greece (2011–14; 2019–present); Russia (2014–19)
- Residence: Nea Ionia, Greece
- Born: 18 May 1994 (age 32) Marousi, Greece
- Height: 1.91 m (6 ft 3 in)
- Turned pro: 2012
- Plays: Right-handed (two handed-backhand)
- Coach: Elina Neplii
- Prize money: US $168,859

Singles
- Career record: 1–2 (at ATP Tour level, Grand Slam level, and in Davis Cup)
- Career titles: 0
- Highest ranking: No. 445 (13 June 2016)

Doubles
- Career record: 2–6 (at ATP Tour level, Grand Slam level, and in Davis Cup)
- Career titles: 20 ITF
- Highest ranking: No. 178 (8 August 2022)
- Current ranking: No. 1,554 (9 November 2026)

Team competitions
- Davis Cup: 6–5
- Last updated on: 9 November 2026.

Markos Kalovelonis (Greek: Μάρκος Καλοβελώνης, Марк Георгиевич Каловелонис; born 18 May 1994) is a Greek-Russian tennis player. He has a career high ATP singles ranking of World No. 445 achieved on 13 June 2016 and a career high ATP doubles ranking of World No. 178 achieved on 8 August 2022. Kalovelonis has won 21 ITF doubles titles.

Kalovelonis has represented Greece at the Davis Cup where he has a W/L record of 6–5. He also represented Greece in the ATP Cup in 2020, 2021 and 2022.

Kalovelonis is the son of former Greek tennis player, George Kalovelonis and Russian Karina Nazarenko. In 2014, Kalovelonis decided to represent Russia instead of Greece. In 2019, Kalovelonis switched back to represent Greece. He is fluent in Russian, Greek and English.

== Futures and Challenger finals ==
=== Singles: 4 (0–4) ===
Legend (singles) ATP Challenger Tour (0–0) ITF Futures Tour (0–4)	Titles by surface Hard (0–2) Clay (0–2) Grass (0–0)

Result	W–L	Date	Tournament	Tier	Surface	Opponent	Score
Loss	0–1	Jan 2016	Kazakhstan, Aktobe	Futures	Hard (i)	(Belarus) Sergey Betov	3–6, 4–6
Loss	0–2	Jun 2016	Uzbekistan, Namangan	Futures	Hard	(Chinese Taipei) Chen Ti	4–6, 2–6
Loss	0–3	Jun 2018	United States, Rochester, New York	Futures	Clay	(United States) Alex Rybakov	1–6, 6–7^{(6–8)}
Loss	0–4	Jul 2018	Estonia, Pärnu	Futures	Clay	(Sweden) Dragoș Nicolae Mădăraș	2–6, 3–6

=== Doubles: 53 (23–30) ===
Legend (doubles) ATP Challenger Tour (1–4) ITF Futures Tour (22–26)	Titles by surface Hard (16–18) Clay (7–11) Grass (0–0) Carpet (0–1)

Result	W–L	Date	Tournament	Tier	Surface	Partner	Opponents	Score
Loss	0–1	Apr 2012	Greece, Heraklion	Futures	Carpet	(Greece) Charalampos Kapogiannis	(Austria) Björn Propst (Austria) Bastian Trinker	1–6, 3–6
Win	1–1	July 2013	Egypt, Sharm El Sheikh	Futures	Clay	(Sweden) Angelos Lenis	(Egypt) Karim Hossam (Egypt) Karim-Mohamed Maamoun	6–4, 3–6, [10–6]
Win	2–1	Sep 2013	Greece, Filippiada	Futures	Hard	(Greece) Alexandros Jakupovic	(Bulgaria) Valentin Dimov (Bulgaria) Dinko Halachev	6–3, 6–3
Loss	2–2	Apr 2014	Uzbekistan, Karshi	Futures	Hard	(Uzbekistan) Shonigmatjon Shofayziyev	(Poland) Piotr Gadomski (Poland) Adam Majchrowicz	5–7, 1–6
Win	3–2	Jun 2014	Turkey, Istanbul	Futures	Hard	(Peru) Alexander Merino	(Australia) Damian Farinola (Australia) Darren Polkinghorne	3–6, 6–1, [10–8]
Loss	3–3	Aug 2014	Iran, Tehran	Futures	Clay	(Iran) Amirvala Madanchi	(India) Vinayak Sharma Kaza (India) Vijay Sundar Prashanth	3–6, 4–6
Loss	3–4	Nov 2014	Greece, Heraklion	Futures	Hard	(Greece) Alexandros Jakupovic	(Serbia) Ivan Bjelica (Serbia) Miljan Zekić	3–6, 6–7^{(4–7)}
Win	4–4	Nov 2014	Greece, Heraklion	Futures	Hard	(Greece) Alexandros Jakupovic	(Belgium) Sander Gillé (France) Alexis Musialek	7–6^{(7–1)}, 7–6^{(7–4)}
Loss	4–5	Nov 2014	Greece, Heraklion	Futures	Hard	(Greece) Alexandros Jakupovic	(Serbia) Danilo Petrović (Serbia) Ilija Vucic	5–7, 2–6
Win	5–5	Mar 2015	Greece, Heraklion	Futures	Hard	(Greece) Alexandros Jakupovic	(Romania) Patrich Grigoriu (Romania) Costin Pavăl	6–4, 6–2
Win	6–5	Apr 2015	Greece, Heraklion	Futures	Hard	(Greece) Alexandros Jakupovic	(Romania) Patrich Grigoriu (Romania) Costin Pavăl	2–6, 7–5, [10–5]
Loss	6–6	Apr 2015	Egypt, Sharm El Sheikh	Futures	Hard	(Austria) Lucas Miedler	(Austria) Martin Fischer (Switzerland) Jannis Liniger	4–6, 2–6
Win	7–6	Apr 2015	Greece, Heraklion	Futures	Hard	(Greece) Alexandros Jakupovic	(United Kingdom) Joe Salisbury (United Kingdom) Joshua Ward-Hibbert	6–1, 6–2
Loss	7–7	May 2015	Croatia, Bol	Futures	Clay	(Canada) Martin Beran	(Hungary) Gábor Borsos (Hungary) Levente Gödry	4–6, 5–7
Loss	7–8	Jun 2015	Uzbekistan, Andijan	Futures	Hard	(Uzbekistan) Shonigmatjon Shofayziyev	(Russia) Denis Matsukevich (Ukraine) Denys Molchanov	6–2, 6–7^{(5–7)}, [12–14]
Loss	7–9	Jun 2015	Turkey, Istanbul	Futures	Hard	(Uzbekistan) Temur Ismailov	(Turkey) Tuna Altuna (Australia) Bradley Mousley	4–6, 4–6
Loss	7–10	Sep 2015	India, Chennai	Futures	Hard	(Kazakhstan) Timur Khabibulin	(India) Jeevan Nedunchezhiyan (India) Vijay Sundar Prashanth	6–4, 3–6, [4–10]
Loss	7–11	Sep 2015	India, Chennai	Futures	Hard	(India) Kunal Anand	(China) Xin Gao (China) Bowen Ouyang	2–6, 7–5, [9–11]
Loss	7–12	Oct 2015	Kazakhstan, Shymkent	Futures	Clay	(Bulgaria) Aleksandar Lazov	(Russia) Ivan Gakhov (Georgia (country)) Aleksandre Metreveli	6–7^{(4–7)}, 3–6
Win	8–12	Dec 2015	Cyprus, Lamaca	Futures	Hard	(Greece) Konstantinos Economidis	(Spain) Andrés Artuñedo Martinavarro (Canada) Steven Diez	4–6, 6–3, [10–5]
Loss	8–13	Apr 2016	Kazakhstan, Shymkent	Futures	Clay	(Georgia (country)) Aleksandre Metreveli	(Uzbekistan) Saniar Fayziev (Belarus) Andrei Vasilevski	2–6, 4–6
Win	9–13	Apr 2016	Kazakhstan, Shymkent	Futures	Clay	(Georgia (country)) Aleksandre Metreveli	(Serbia) Miki Janković (Belarus) Andrei Vasilevski	6–4, 6–1
Win	10–13	May 2016	Uzbekistan, Andijan	Futures	Hard	(India) Sriram Balaji	(Kazakhstan) Roman Khassanov (Russia) Vitaly Kozyukov	6–3, 6–4
Loss	10–14	Aug 2016	Belarus, Minsk	Futures	Hard	(Bulgaria) Vasko Mladenov	(Belarus) Yaraslav Shyla (Belarus) Dzmitry Zhyrmont	6–7^{(8–10)}, 3–6
Loss	10–15	Oct 2016	Greece, Heraklion	Futures	Hard	(Ukraine) Filipp Kekercheni	(Poland) Adrian Andrzejczuk (Poland) Mateusz Smolicki	7–6^{(7–1)}, 6–7^{(5–7)}, [9–11]
Loss	10–16	Dec 2016	Cyprus, Lamaca	Futures	Hard	(France) Alexandre Müller	(Austria) Lucas Miedler; Maximilian Neuchrist	3–6, 6–1, [5–10]
Loss	10–17	Mar 2017	Greece, Heraklion	Futures	Hard	(Uzbekistan) Temur Ismailov	(United States) Hunter Callahan (United States) Nicholas S. Hu	6–4, 1–6, [11–13]
Win	11–17	Jul 2017	Russia, Kazan	Futures	Hard	(Russia) Evgenii Tiurnev	(Russia) Alexander Boborykin (Russia) Timur Kiyamov	6–2, 7–6^{(10–8)}
Loss	11–18	Aug 2017	Russia, Kazan	Futures	Hard	(Russia) Alexander Pavlioutchenkov	(Kyrgyzstan) Daniiar Duldaev (Kazakhstan) Denis Yevseyev	6–7^{(2–7)}, 4–6
Win	12–18	Apr 2018	Greece, Heraklion	Futures	Hard	(Belarus) Yaraslav Shyla	(Italy) Erik Crepaldi (Czech Republic) Petr Michnev	6–4, 7–6^{(7–5)}
Loss	12–19	Jul 2018	Estonia, Pärnu	Futures	Clay	(Russia) Denis Klok	(Netherlands) Marc Dijkhuizen (Netherlands) Bart Stevens	4–6, 2–6
Win	13–19	Sep 2018	Egypt, Cairo	Futures	Clay	(Austria) Alexander Erler	(India) Anirudh Chandrasekar (India) Aryan Goveas	6–4, 7–6^{(7–3)}
Loss	13–20	Nov 2018	Greece, Heraklion	Futures	Hard	(Greece) Petros Tsitsipas	(Czech Republic) Vit Kopriva (Austria) David Pichler	2–6, 6–4, [7–10]
Win	14–20	Dec 2018	Turkey, Antalya	Futures	Clay	(Uzbekistan) Sanjar Fayziev	(Czech Republic) Tadeas Paroulek (Ukraine) Oleg Prihodko	7–5, 3–6, [10–6]
Loss	14–21	Apr 2019	M25 Andijan, Uzbekistan	World Tennis Tour	Hard	(Kazakhstan) Grigoriy Lomakin	(Kazakhstan) Timur Khabibulin (Ukraine) Vladyslav Manafov	5–7, 1–6
Win	15–21	Jun 2019	M15 Akko, Israel	World Tennis Tour	Hard	(Greece) Michail Pervolarakis	(Republic of Ireland) Julian Bradley (France) Florian Lakat	6–7^{(9–11)}, 6–4, [10–6]
Loss	15–22	Aug 2019	M15 Moscow, Russia	World Tennis Tour	Clay	(Uzbekistan) Sergey Fomin	(Russia) Alen Avidzba (Russia) Ivan Davydov	6–3, 1–6, [7–10]
Win	16–22	Mar 2021	M15 Antalya, Turkey	World Tennis Tour	Clay	(Uzbekistan) Sanjar Fayziev	(Romania) Vlad Andrei Dancu (Bulgaria) Gabriel Donev	5–7, 7–6^{(7–3)}, [10–7]
Win	17–22	May 2021	M15 Tbilisi, Georgia	World Tennis Tour	Hard	(Uzbekistan) Sanjar Fayziev	(Georgia (country)) Aleksandre Bakshi (Georgia (country)) Zura Tkemaladze	6–4, 3–6, [10–5]
Loss	17–23	May 2021	M15 Shymkent, Kazakhstan	World Tennis Tour	Clay	(Uzbekistan) Sanjar Fayziev	(Russia) Yan Bondarevskiy (Kazakhstan) Grigoriy Lomakin	3–6, 4–6
Win	18–23	Jul 2021	M25 Nur-Sultan, Kazakhstan	World Tennis Tour	Hard	(Uzbekistan) Sanjar Fayziev	(Ukraine) Oleksii Krutykh (Ukraine) Vladyslav Manafov	7–6^{(7–1)}, 6–3
Loss	18–24	Sep 2021	M25 Johannesburg, South Africa	World Tennis Tour	Hard	(Greece) Michail Pervolarakis	(South Africa) Alec Beckley (South Africa) Vaughn Hunter	1–6, 6–7^{(5–7)}
Win	19–24	Oct 2021	M25 Nur-Sultan, Kazakhstan	World Tennis Tour	Hard (i)	(Uzbekistan) Sanjar Fayziev	(Belarus) Aliaksandr Liaonenka (Russia) Yan Sabanin	6–7^{(7–9)}, 6–4, [10–7]
Win	20–24	Nov 2021	M15 Heraklion, Greece	World Tennis Tour	Hard	(Uzbekistan) Sanjar Fayziev	(Australia) William Ma (France) Alexis Musialek	6–4, 6–1
Loss	20–25	Dec 2021	Antalya, Turkey	Challenger	Clay	(Uzbekistan) Sanjar Fayziev	(Chinese Taipei) Hsu Yu-hsiou (Ukraine) Oleksii Krutykh	1–6, 6–7^{(5–7)}
Loss	20–26	Jan 2022	M25 Cairo, Egypt	World Tennis Tour	Clay	(Austria) David Pichler	(Chinese Taipei) Yu Hsiou Hsu (Austria) Neil Oberleitner	6–7^{(5–7)}, 4–6
Win	21–26	Mar 2022	M25 Antalya, Turkey	World Tennis Tour	Clay	(Uzbekistan) Sanjar Fayziev	(Tunisia) Moez Echargui (Italy) Alexander Weis	6–2, 6–4
Loss	21–27	Mar 2022	Oeiras, Portugal	Challenger	Clay	(Uzbekistan) Sanjar Fayziev	(Portugal) Nuno Borges (Portugal) Francisco Cabral	3–6, 0–6
Win	22–27	May 2022	Shymkent, Kazakhstan	Challenger	Clay	(Uzbekistan) Sanjar Fayziev	(Denmark) Mikael Torpegaard (Japan) Kaichi Uchida	6–7^{(3–7)}, 6–4, [10–4]
Win	23–27	Aug 2023	M25 Jakarta, Indonesia	World Tennis Tour	Hard	(Uzbekistan) Khumoyun Sultanov	(Thailand) Palaphoom Kovapitukted (India) Manish Sureshkumar	4–6, 7–5, [10–7]
Loss	23–28	Oct 2023	Shenzhen, China	Challenger	Hard	Mikalai Haliak	(China) Gao Xin (China) Wang Aoran	4–6, 2–6
Loss	23–29	Nov 2023	M25 Heraklion, Greece	World Tennis Tour	Hard	(Cyprus) Sergis Kyratzis	(Sweden) Simon Freund (Ukraine) Vladyslav Orlov	7–6^{(7–4)}, 4–6, [7–10]
Loss	23–30	Jun 2024	Lyon, France	Challenger	Clay	(Ukraine) Vladyslav Orlov	(France) Manuel Guinard (France) Grégoire Jacq	6–4, 3–6, [6–10]
