= Antalya Challenger =

Antalya Open
- 2026 Antalya Challenger 4

Tournament information
- Event name: ATİK Antalya Open (4th edition), Megasaray Hotels Open (first 3 editions)
- Founded: 2021 (ATP), 2024 (WTA)
- Location: Antalya, Turkey
- Venue: Megasaray Tennis Academy; Antalya Tenis İhtisas Spor Kulübü (ATİK)
- Surface: Clay / outdoors
- Website: atikantalyaopen.com

Current champions (2026)
- Women's singles: (Bulgaria) Rositsa Dencheva
- Women's doubles: (Czech Republic) Aneta Kučmová (Czech Republic) Aneta Laboutková
ATP Tour
- Category: ATP Challenger Tour (2021, 2023)
- Draw: 32S / 24Q / 16D
- Prize money: €73,000 (2023)
WTA Tour
- Category: WTA 125
- Draw: 32S / 16Q / 16D
- Prize money: US$115,000 (2026)

The Antalya Open is a professional tennis tournament played on clay courts. It is currently part of the WTA 125 tournaments. It is held annually in Antalya, Turkey since 2024 for the women, in four editions (since 2026), and was held in 2021 and in 2023 for the men as part of the ATP Challenger Tour.

== Past finals ==
=== Men's singles ===
Year	Champion	Runner-up	Score
2023	(Hungary) Fábián Marozsán	(Austria) Sebastian Ofner	7–5, 6–0
2022	Not held		
2021 (4)	(Russia) Evgenii Tiurnev	(Ukraine) Oleg Prihodko	3–6, 6–4, 6–4
2021 (3)	(Portugal) Nuno Borges	(United Kingdom) Ryan Peniston	6–4, 6–3
2021 (2)	(Spain) Carlos Taberner	(Spain) Jaume Munar	6–4, 6–1
2021 (1)	(Spain) Jaume Munar	(Italy) Lorenzo Musetti	6–7^{(7–9)}, 6–2, 6–2

=== Women's singles ===
Year	Champion	Runner-up	Score
2026 (4)	(Bulgaria) Rositsa Dencheva	Alevtina Ibragimova	7–5, 6–4
2026 (3)	(Ukraine) Anhelina Kalinina (2)	(Slovenia) Tamara Zidanšek	6–0, 6–3
2026 (2)	(Ukraine) Anhelina Kalinina	(Ukraine) Oleksandra Oliynykova	6–3, 3–6, 6–2
2026 (1)	(Japan) Moyuka Uchijima	(Ukraine) Anhelina Kalinina	7–5, 7–5
2025 (3)	(Argentina) Solana Sierra	(Spain) Leyre Romero Gormaz	6–3, 6–4
2025 (2)	(Serbia) Olga Danilović	(Andorra) Victoria Jiménez Kasintseva	6–2, 6–3
2025 (1)	(Romania) Anca Todoni	(Spain) Leyre Romero Gormaz	6–3, 6–2
2024	(Spain) Jéssica Bouzas Maneiro	(Romania) Irina-Camelia Begu	6–2, 4–6, 6–2

=== Men's doubles ===
Year	Champions	Runners-up	Score
2023	(Sweden) Filip Bergevi (Greece) Petros Tsitsipas	(Turkey) Sarp Ağabigün (Turkey) Ergi Kırkın	6–2, 6–4
2022	Not held		
2021 (4)	(Chinese Taipei) Hsu Yu-hsiou (Ukraine) Oleksii Krutykh	(Uzbekistan) Sanjar Fayziev (Greece) Markos Kalovelonis	6–1, 7–6^{(7–5)}
2021 (3)	(Italy) Riccardo Bonadio (Italy) Giovanni Fonio	(Chinese Taipei) Hsu Yu-hsiou (Chinese Taipei) Tseng Chun-hsin	3–6, 6–2, [12–10]
2021 (2)	(Ukraine) Denys Molchanov (2) (Kazakhstan) Aleksandr Nedovyesov (2)	(United States) Robert Galloway (United States) Alex Lawson	6–4, 7–6^{(7–2)}
2021 (1)	(Ukraine) Denys Molchanov (Kazakhstan) Aleksandr Nedovyesov	(Venezuela) Luis David Martínez (Spain) David Vega Hernández	3–6, 6–4, [18–16]

=== Women's doubles ===
Year	Champions	Runners-up	Score
2026 (4)	(Czech Republic) Aneta Kučmová (Czech Republic) Aneta Laboutková	Alevtina Ibragimova; Ksenia Zaytseva	4–6, 6–2, [10–6]
2026 (3)	Maria Kozyreva (2); Iryna Shymanovich (2)	(Poland) Maja Chwalińska (Czech Republic) Jesika Malečková	7–6^{(9–7)}, 6–4
2026 (2)	(France) Estelle Cascino (Argentina) Nicole Fossa Huergo	(Czech Republic) Jesika Malečková (Czech Republic) Miriam Škoch	7–5, 7–6^{(8–6)}
2026 (1)	Maria Kozyreva; Iryna Shymanovich	(Japan) Momoko Kobori (Thailand) Peangtarn Plipuech	7–5, 6–1
2025 (3)	(Hungary) Anna Bondár (Switzerland) Simona Waltert (2)	(United Kingdom) Alicia Barnett (France) Elixane Lechemia	7–5, 2–6, [10–6]
2025 (2)	(Argentina) María Lourdes Carlé (Switzerland) Simona Waltert	(Poland) Maja Chwalińska (Czech Republic) Anastasia Dețiuc	3–6, 7–5, [10–3]
2025 (1)	(Poland) Maja Chwalińska (Czech Republic) Anastasia Dețiuc	(Czech Republic) Jesika Malečková (Czech Republic) Miriam Škoch	4–6, 6–3, [10–2]
2024	(Italy) Angelica Moratelli (Italy) Camilla Rosatello	(Hungary) Tímea Babos; Vera Zvonareva	6–3, 3–6, [15–13]
