= 2024 Copa LP Chile – Doubles =

Doubles
- 2024 Copa LP Chile

Final
- Champions: (Egypt) Mayar Sherif (Serbia) Nina Stojanović
- Runners-up: (France) Léolia Jeanjean (France) Kristina Mladenovic
- Score: Walkover

Events
Singles	Doubles
← 2023 ·	Copa LP Chile	· 2025 →

Mayar Sherif and Nina Stojanović won the doubles title at the 2024 Copa LP Chile after Léolia Jeanjean and Kristina Mladenovic withdrew from the final due to Jeanjean's elbow injury.

Julia Lohoff and Conny Perrin were the reigning champions, but did not participate this year.

== Seeds ==
1. (United States) Jessie Aney / Amina Anshba (semifinals)
2. (Portugal) Francisca Jorge / (Brazil) Laura Pigossi (semifinals)
3. (Italy) Nicole Fossa Huergo / (Colombia) María Paulina Pérez (quarterfinals)
4. (France) Léolia Jeanjean / (France) Kristina Mladenovic (final, withdrew)

== Draw ==
=== Key ===
- Q = Qualifier
- WC = Wild card
- LL = Lucky loser
- Alt = Alternate
- ITF = ITF entry
- PR = Protected ranking
- SR = Special ranking
- SE = Special exempt
- JE = Junior exempt
- JR = Junior Accelerator Programme entrant
- CO = College Accelerator Programme entrant
- NG = Next Gen Accelerator Program entrant
- w/o = Walkover
- r = Retired
- d = Defaulted

=== Draw ===
First round
(Finland) A Kulikova; D Lodikova	1	6	[6]
(Ukraine) V Strakhova; M Tkacheva	6	3	[10]
3	(Italy) N Fossa Huergo (Colombia) MP Pérez	w/o
(Argentina) M Capurro Taborda (Spain) G Maristany
(Spain) A Fita Boluda (Switzerland) Y In-Albon	4	6^{8}
(Egypt) M Sherif (Serbia) N Stojanović	6	7^{10}
A Ibragimova (Chile) A Vergara Rivera	2	5
(United States) H Giavara (Moldova) A Rencheli	6	7
(Chile) J Gerald González (Chile) P Goldsmith Weinreich	4	1
4	(France) L Jeanjean (France) K Mladenovic	6	6
(Chile) F Labraña (Brazil) R Pereira	5	3
(United States) R Anderson (India) P Thombare	7	6

Quarterfinals
1	(United States) J Aney; A Anshba	w/o
(Ukraine) V Strakhova; M Tkacheva
3	(Italy) N Fossa Huergo (Colombia) MP Pérez	3	2
(Egypt) M Sherif (Serbia) N Stojanović	6	6
(United States) H Giavara (Moldova) A Rencheli	6	5	[6]
4	(France) L Jeanjean (France) K Mladenovic	2	7	[10]
(United States) R Anderson (India) P Thombare	6^{2}	5
2	(Portugal) F Jorge (Brazil) L Pigossi	7^{7}	7

Semifinals
1	(United States) J Aney; A Anshba	6	6^{2}	[8]
(Egypt) M Sherif (Serbia) N Stojanović	4	7^{7}	[10]
4	(France) L Jeanjean (France) K Mladenovic	6	6
2	(Portugal) F Jorge (Brazil) L Pigossi	1	4

Final
(Egypt) M Sherif (Serbia) N Stojanović	w/o
4	(France) L Jeanjean (France) K Mladenovic
