= 2024 Copa LP Chile – Singles =

Singles
- 2024 Copa LP Chile

Final
- Champion: (Serbia) Nina Stojanović
- Runner-up: (Argentina) María Lourdes Carlé
- Score: 3–6, 6–4, 6–4

Details
- Draw: 32 (5 WC)
- Seeds: 8

Events
| Singles | Doubles |
| ← 2023 · | Copa LP Chile | · 2025 → |

Sára Bejlek was the defending champion, but lost in the semifinals to Nina Stojanović. Stojanović went on to win the title, her first at WTA 125 level, defeating María Lourdes Carlé 3–6, 6–4, 6–4 in the final.

== Seeds ==
1. (Netherlands) Suzan Lamens (first round)
2. (Argentina) María Lourdes Carlé (final)
3. (Egypt) Mayar Sherif (semifinals)
4. (United States) Robin Montgomery (second round)
5. (France) Chloé Paquet (withdrew)
6. (Latvia) Darja Semeņistaja (quarterfinals)
7. (Brazil) Laura Pigossi (second round)
8. (Czech Republic) Sára Bejlek (semifinals)

== Draw ==
=== Key ===
- Q = Qualifier
- WC = Wild card
- LL = Lucky loser
- Alt = Alternate
- ITF = ITF entry
- PR = Protected ranking
- SR = Special ranking
- SE = Special exempt
- JE = Junior exempt
- JR = Junior Accelerator Programme entrant
- CO = College Accelerator Programme entrant
- NG = Next Gen Accelerator Program entrant
- w/o = Walkover
- r = Retired
- d = Defaulted

=== Finals ===
Semifinals
PR | (Serbia) Nina Stojanović | 6 | 7
8 | (Czech Republic) Sára Bejlek | 4 | 5
3 | (Egypt) Mayar Sherif | 3 | 1
2 | (Argentina) María Lourdes Carlé | 6 | 6

Final
PR | (Serbia) Nina Stojanović | 3 | 6 | 6
2 | (Argentina) María Lourdes Carlé | 6 | 4 | 4

=== Top half ===
First round
1 | (Netherlands) S Lamens | 5 | 2
PR | (Serbia) N Stojanović | 7 | 6
Q | (Ukraine) O Oliynykova | 6 | 7
Q | (Argentina) M Capurro Taborda | 3 | 5
(France) K Mladenovic | 6 | 6
WC | (Chile) J Gerald González | 0 | 3
(United Kingdom) F Jones | 6^{5} | 3^{r}
6 | (Latvia) D Semeņistaja | 7^{7} | 2
4 | (United States) R Montgomery | 6 | 6
LL | (Switzerland) Y In-Albon | 3 | 4
WC | (Chile) A Vergara Rivera | 1 | 0
(Spain) G Maristany | 6 | 6
WC | (Peru) L Pérez Alarcón | 6^{2} | 2
Q | D Lodikova | 7^{7} | 6
LL | (Chile) F Rain Contreras | 0 | 0
8 | (Czech Republic) S Bejlek | 6 | 6

Second round
PR | (Serbia) N Stojanović | 6 | 6
Q | (Ukraine) O Oliynykova | 4 | 2
(France) K Mladenovic | 4 | 6^{4}
6 | (Latvia) D Semeņistaja | 6 | 7^{7}
4 | (United States) R Montgomery | 0 | 1
(Spain) G Maristany | 6 | 6
Q | D Lodikova | 2 | 1
8 | (Czech Republic) S Bejlek | 6 | 6

Quarterfinals
PR | (Serbia) N Stojanović | 6 | 6
6 | (Latvia) D Semeņistaja | 1 | 2
(Spain) G Maristany | 3 | 2
8 | (Czech Republic) S Bejlek | 6 | 6

Semifinals
PR | (Serbia) N Stojanović | 6 | 7
8 | (Czech Republic) S Bejlek | 4 | 5

=== Bottom half ===
First round
7 | (Brazil) L Pigossi | 6 | 6
(United States) E Mandlik | 4 | 0
(Portugal) F Jorge | 6 | 6
(Spain) Á Fita Boluda | 1 | 4
(Colombia) E Arango | 6 | 2 | 7^{7}
(Finland) A Kulikova | 3 | 6 | 6^{2}
A Ibragimova | 4 | 1
3 | (Egypt) M Sherif | 6 | 6
LL | (Romania) G Crăciun | 6 | 6
(Brazil) C Alves | 3 | 2
(Italy) M Paoletti | 4 | 6 | 6^{4}
Q | (Italy) N Fossa Huergo | 6 | 1 | 7^{7}
(France) L Jeanjean | 6 | 6
WC | (Chile) F Labraña | 0 | 2
(United States) R Anderson | 2 | 1
2 | (Argentina) ML Carlé | 6 | 6

Second round
7 | (Brazil) L Pigossi | 5 | 5
(Portugal) F Jorge | 7 | 7
(Colombia) E Arango | 2 | 3
3 | (Egypt) M Sherif | 6 | 6
LL | (Romania) G Crăciun | 6 | 3 | 6
Q | (Italy) N Fossa Huergo | 3 | 6 | 3
(France) L Jeanjean | 6 | 1 | 1
2 | (Argentina) ML Carlé | 1 | 6 | 6

Quarterfinals
(Portugal) F Jorge | 1 | 4
3 | (Egypt) M Sherif | 6 | 6
LL | (Romania) G Crăciun | 3 | 6^{3}
2 | (Argentina) ML Carlé | 6 | 7^{7}

Semifinals
3 | (Egypt) M Sherif | 3 | 1
2 | (Argentina) ML Carlé | 6 | 6

== Qualifying ==
=== Seeds ===
1. (Italy) Nicole Fossa Huergo (qualified)
2. (Ukraine) Oleksandra Oliynykova (qualified)
3. Daria Lodikova (qualified)
4. (Argentina) Martina Capurro Taborda (qualified)

=== Qualifiers ===
1. (Italy) Nicole Fossa Huergo
2. (Ukraine) Oleksandra Oliynykova
3. Daria Lodikova
4. (Argentina) Martina Capurro Taborda

=== Lucky losers ===
1. (Romania) Georgia Crăciun
2. (Switzerland) Ylena In-Albon
3. (Chile) Fernanda Rain Contreras

=== Qualifying draw ===
==== First qualifier ====
| Qualifying competition |
| 1 | (Italy) Nicole Fossa Huergo | 7^{8} | 5 | 7 |
| | (Romania) Georgia Crăciun | 6^{6} | 7 | 5 |

==== Second qualifier ====
| Qualifying competition |
| 2 | (Ukraine) Oleksandra Oliynykova | 6 | 6 |
| | (Switzerland) Ylena In-Albon | 3 | 2 |

==== Third qualifier ====
| Qualifying competition |
| 3 | Daria Lodikova | 6 | 6 |
| WC | (Chile) Fernanda Rain Contreras | 1 | 2 |

==== Fourth qualifier ====
| Qualifying competition |
| 4 | (Argentina) Martina Capurro Taborda | 6 | 6 |
| WC | (Chile) Paloma Goldsmith Weinreich | 0 | 0 |
