= 2024 Copa LP Chile =

- Date: 18–24 November 2024
- Edition: 7th
- Category: WTA 125
- Prize money: $115,000
- Surface: Clay / Outdoor
- Location: Colina, Chile
- Venue: Hacienda Chicureo

Champions

Singles
- (Serbia) Nina Stojanović

Doubles
- (Egypt) Mayar Sherif / (Serbia) Nina Stojanović
← 2023 ·	Copa LP Chile	· 2025 →

The 2024 Copa LP Chile, also known as LP Open by IND, for sponsorship reasons, was a professional women's tennis tournament played on outdoor clay courts. It was the seventh edition of the tournament which was also part of the 2024 WTA 125 season. It took place at the Hacienda Chicureo Club in Colina, Chile between 18 and 24 November 2024.

== Singles main-draw entrants ==
=== Seeds ===
Country	Player	Rank^{1}	Seed
NED	Suzan Lamens	87	1
ARG	María Lourdes Carlé	95	2
EGY	Mayar Sherif	100	3
USA	Robin Montgomery	107	4
FRA	Chloé Paquet	111	5
LAT	Darja Semeņistaja	121	6
BRA	Laura Pigossi	129	7
CZE	Sára Bejlek	142	8

- ^{1} Rankings are as of 11 November 2024.

=== Other entrants ===
The following players received wildcards into the singles main draw:

- (Chile) Jimar Gerald González
- (Chile) Fernanda Labraña
- (Peru) Lucciana Pérez Alarcón
- (Chile) Antonia Vergara Rivera

The following player received entry using a special ranking:

- (Serbia) Nina Stojanović

The following players received entry from the qualifying draw:

- (Argentina) Martina Capurro Taborda
- (Italy) Nicole Fossa Huergo
- Daria Lodikova
- (Ukraine) Oleksandra Oliynykova

The following players received entry as lucky losers:

- (Romania) Georgia Crăciun
- (Switzerland) Ylena In-Albon
- (Chile) Fernanda Rain Contreras

== Doubles entrants ==
=== Seeds ===
Country	Player	Country	Player	Rank^{1}	Seed
USA	Jessie Aney		Amina Anshba	239	1
POR	Francisca Jorge	BRA	Laura Pigossi	336	2
ITA	Nicole Fossa Huergo	COL	María Paulina Pérez	366	3
FRA	Léolia Jeanjean	FRA	Kristina Mladenovic	405	4

- ^{1} Rankings as of 11 November 2024.

== Champions ==
=== Singles ===
- (Serbia) Nina Stojanović def. (Argentina) María Lourdes Carlé 3–6, 6–4, 6–4

=== Doubles ===
- (Egypt) Mayar Sherif / (Serbia) Nina Stojanović def. (France) Léolia Jeanjean / (France) Kristina Mladenovic, walkover
