= 2023 Copa LP Chile – Singles =

Singles
- 2023 Copa LP Chile

Final
- Champion: (Czech Republic) Sára Bejlek
- Runner-up: (France) Diane Parry
- Score: 6–2, 6–1

Details
- Draw: 32 (5 WC)
- Seeds: 8

Events
Singles	Doubles
- Copa LP Chile

Sára Bejlek won the singles title at the 2023 Copa LP Chile, defeating Diane Parry in the final, 6–2, 6–1.

Mayar Sherif was the defending champion but lost to Polona Hercog in the second round.

== Seeds ==
1. (Egypt) Mayar Sherif (second round)
2. Diana Shnaider (first round)
3. (Argentina) Nadia Podoroska (semifinals)
4. (Italy) Sara Errani (first round)
5. (France) Diane Parry (final)
6. (Hungary) Anna Bondár (first round)
7. (United States) Elizabeth Mandlik (semifinals)
8. (France) Léolia Jeanjean (quarterfinals)

== Draw ==
Key

- Q = Qualifier
- WC = Wild card
- LL = Lucky loser
- Alt = Alternate
- ITF = ITF entry
- PR = Protected ranking
- SR = Special ranking
- SE = Special exempt
- JE = Junior exempt
- JR = Junior Accelerator Programme entrant
- CO = College Accelerator Programme entrant
- NG = Next Gen Accelerator Program entrant
- w/o = Walkover
- r = Retired
- d = Defaulted

=== Finals ===
Semifinals
5	(France) Diane Parry	7^{7}	6
7	(United States) Elizabeth Mandlik	6^{3}	2
3	(Argentina) Nadia Podoroska	0	6	2
(Czech Republic) Sára Bejlek	6	4	6

Final
5	(France) Diane Parry	2	1
(Czech Republic) Sára Bejlek	6	6

=== Top half ===
First round
1/WC	(Egypt) M Sherif	6	6
(Argentina) J Riera	2	4
(Slovenia) P Hercog	6	4	6
(Romania) M Bulgaru	4	6	2
(France) F Ferro	6	6
(Brazil) C Alves	4	1
(Argentina) ML Carlé	6	3	5
5	(France) D Parry	1	6	7
4	(Italy) S Errani	1	6^{1}
(Ukraine) Y Starodubtseva	6	7^{7}
Q	(Burundi) S Nahimana	2	1
WC	(Argentina) G Naya	6	6
(France) C Monnet	6	0	3
(Brazil) L Pigossi	4	6	6
WC	(Peru) L Pérez Alarcón	1	0
7	(United States) E Mandlik	6	6

Second round
1/WC	(Egypt) M Sherif	6^{11}	6	1
(Slovenia) P Hercog	7^{13}	4	6
(France) F Ferro	4	1
5	(France) D Parry	6	6
(Ukraine) Y Starodubtseva	6	6
WC	(Argentina) G Naya	2	0
(Brazil) L Pigossi	6	4	0
7	(United States) E Mandlik	3	6	6

Quarterfinals
(Slovenia) P Hercog	7^{9}	3	1
5	(France) D Parry	6^{7}	6	6
(Ukraine) Y Starodubtseva	6^{1}	3
7	(United States) E Mandlik	7^{7}	6

Semifinals
5	(France) D Parry	7^{7}	6
7	(United States) E Mandlik	6^{3}	2

=== Bottom half ===
First round
8	(France) L Jeanjean	6	6
Q	A Anshba	3	1
(Argentina) S Sierra	3	2
(Greece) D Papamichail	6	6
WC	(Chile) D Seguel	7	7^{7}
(Turkey) İ Öz	5	6^{3}
Q	(Switzerland) C Perrin	6^{5}	6	5
3	(Argentina) N Podoroska	7^{7}	1	7
6	(Hungary) A Bondár	7	2	3
(Czech Republic) S Bejlek	5	6	6
(Argentina) M Capurro Taborda	2	1
Q	(Georgia (country)) E Gorgodze	6	6
(Spain) J Bouzas Maneiro	6	6
WC	(Chile) F Labraña	2	0
(Hungary) P Udvardy	6	6
2	D Shnaider	3	4

Second round
8	(France) L Jeanjean	2	6	6
(Greece) D Papamichail	6	4	2
WC	(Chile) D Seguel	1	4
3	(Argentina) N Podoroska	6	6
(Czech Republic) S Bejlek	6	6
Q	(Georgia (country)) E Gorgodze	1	2
(Spain) J Bouzas Maneiro	4	2
(Hungary) P Udvardy	6	6

Quarterfinals
8	(France) L Jeanjean	4	2
3	(Argentina) N Podoroska	6	6
(Czech Republic) S Bejlek	4	7^{7}	6
(Hungary) P Udvardy	6	6^{3}	4

Semifinals
3	(Argentina) N Podoroska	0	6	2
(Czech Republic) S Bejlek	6	4	6

== Qualifying ==
=== Seeds ===
1. (United States) Makenna Jones (qualifying competition)
2. (Burundi) Sada Nahimana (qualified)
3. (Netherlands) Eva Vedder (qualifying competition)
4. (Switzerland) Conny Perrin (qualified)

=== Qualifiers ===
1. (Georgia (country)) Ekaterine Gorgodze
2. (Burundi) Sada Nahimana
3. Amina Anshba
4. (Switzerland) Conny Perrin

=== Qualifying draw ===
==== First qualifier ====
Qualifying competition
1	(United States) Makenna Jones	6	6^{3}	1
	(Georgia (country)) Ekaterine Gorgodze	4	7^{7}	6

==== Second qualifier ====
Qualifying competition
2	(Burundi) Sada Nahimana	6	7^{7}
WC	(Chile) Antonia Vergara Rivera	2	6^{2}

==== Third qualifier ====
Qualifying competition
3	(Netherlands) Eva Vedder	6	3	0
	Amina Anshba	1	6	6

==== Fourth qualifier ====
Qualifying competition
4	(Switzerland) Conny Perrin	6	6
WC	(Chile) Paloma Goldsmith Weinreich	1	0
