= 2025 Copa LP Chile – Singles =

Singles
- 2025 Copa LP Chile

Final
- Champion: (Ukraine) Oleksandra Oliynykova
- Runner-up: (France) Léolia Jeanjean
- Score: 7–5, 6–1

Details
- Draw: 32 (5 WC)
- Seeds: 8

Events
Singles	Doubles
← 2024 ·	Copa LP Chile	· 2026 →

Oleksandra Oliynykova won the title, defeating Léolia Jeanjean in the final, 7–5, 6–1.

Nina Stojanović was the reigning champion, but did not participate this year.

== Seeds ==
1. (Switzerland) Simona Waltert (withdrew)
2. (Egypt) Mayar Sherif (semifinals)
3. (France) Léolia Jeanjean (final)
4. (Hungary) Panna Udvardy (second round)
5. (Ukraine) Oleksandra Oliynykova (champion)
6. (Slovenia) Veronika Erjavec (first round)
7. (Argentina) María Lourdes Carlé (quarterfinals)
8. (Poland) Maja Chwalińska (quarterfinals)
9. (United States) Varvara Lepchenko (first round)

== Draw ==
Key

- Q = Qualifier
- WC = Wild card
- LL = Lucky loser
- Alt = Alternate
- ITF = ITF entry
- PR = Protected ranking
- SR = Special ranking
- SE = Special exempt
- JE = Junior exempt
- JR = Junior Accelerator Programme entrant
- CO = College Accelerator Programme entrant
- NG = Next Gen Accelerator Program entrant
- w/o = Walkover
- r = Retired
- d = Defaulted

=== Finals ===
Semifinals
(Czech Republic) Laura Samson	6^{4}	2
5	(Ukraine) Oleksandra Oliynykova	7^{7}	6
3	(France) Léolia Jeanjean	6	2	6
2	(Egypt) Mayar Sherif	3	6	4

Final
5	(Ukraine) Oleksandra Oliynykova	7	6
3	(France) Léolia Jeanjean	5	1

=== Top half ===
First round
9	(United States) V Lepchenko	3	5
(Czech Republic) L Samson	6	7
(Spain) S Sorribes Tormo	6	6
Q	(Brazil) G Cé	2	3
(Brazil) C Alves	6	6
(Italy) J Pieri	4	3
(France) C Monnet	3	6	6
6	(Slovenia) V Erjavec	6	4	2
4	(Hungary) P Udvardy	6	7^{8}
WC	(Argentina) L Giovannini	1	6^{6}
(Argentina) J Ortenzi	2	2
Q	(Slovenia) P Hercog	6	6
(Burundi) S Nahimana	6^{1}	7^{7}	6
Q	(Italy) D Cherubini	7^{7}	6^{4}	4
(United States) E Mandlik	2	2
5	(Ukraine) O Oliynykova	6	6

Second round
(Czech Republic) L Samson	7^{7}	6
(Spain) S Sorribes Tormo	6^{1}	4
(Brazil) C Alves	2	4
(France) C Monnet	6	6
4	(Hungary) P Udvardy	6^{11}	1
Q	(Slovenia) P Hercog	7^{13}	6
(Burundi) S Nahimana	0	2
5	(Ukraine) O Oliynykova	6	6

Quarterfinals
(Czech Republic) L Samson	1	6	7
(France) C Monnet	6	2	5
Q	(Slovenia) P Hercog	3	6^{4}
5	(Ukraine) O Oliynykova	6	7^{7}

Semifinals
(Czech Republic) L Samson	6^{4}	2
5	(Ukraine) O Oliynykova	7^{7}	6

=== Bottom half ===
First round
8	(Poland) M Chwalińska	6	4	6
WC	(Italy) M Trevisan	2	6	2
(Greece) D Papamichail	6	6
LL	(Ukraine) V Strakhova	3	0
WC	(Chile) A Vergara Rivera	1	1
(Brazil) L Pigossi	6	6
(Argentina) J Riera	4	6	2
3	(France) L Jeanjean	6	3	6
7	(Argentina) ML Carlé	6	6^{3}	6
Q	(Spain) A Herrero Liñana	3	7^{7}	2
WC	(Chile) F Labraña	6	6^{3}	6
(Argentina) N Fossa Huergo	1	7^{7}	3
(Romania) M Bulgaru	6	6
(United States) A Akli	4	2
(Netherlands) E Vedder	6	3	4
2	(Egypt) M Sherif	1	6	6

Second round
8	(Poland) M Chwalińska	6	6
(Greece) D Papamichail	3	1
(Brazil) L Pigossi	3	7^{7}	4
3	(France) L Jeanjean	6	6^{3}	6
7	(Argentina) ML Carlé	7	6
WC	(Chile) F Labraña	5	0
(Romania) M Bulgaru	0	3
2	(Egypt) M Sherif	6	6

Quarterfinals
8	(Poland) M Chwalińska	4	2
3	(France) L Jeanjean	6	6
7	(Argentina) ML Carlé	4	2
2	(Egypt) M Sherif	6	6

Semifinals
3	(France) L Jeanjean	6	2	6
2	(Egypt) M Sherif	3	6	4

== Qualifying ==
=== Seeds ===
1. (Spain) Alicia Herrero Liñana (qualified)
2. (Brazil) Gabriela Cé (qualified)
3. (Ukraine) Valeriya Strakhova (qualifying competition, lucky loser)
4. (Italy) Diletta Cherubini (qualified)

=== Qualifiers ===
1. (Spain) Alicia Herrero Liñana
2. (Brazil) Gabriela Cé
3. (Slovenia) Polona Hercog
4. (Italy) Diletta Cherubini

=== Lucky loser ===
1. (Ukraine) Valeriya Strakhova

=== Qualifying draw ===
==== First qualifier ====
Qualifying competition
1	(Spain) Alicia Herrero Liñana	6	7
	(Italy) Martina Colmegna	2	5

==== Second qualifier ====
Qualifying competition
2	(Brazil) Gabriela Cé	6	6
WC	(Chile) Jimar Gerald González	1	1

==== Third qualifier ====
Qualifying competition
3	(Ukraine) Valeriya Strakhova	1	0
WC	(Slovenia) Polona Hercog	6	6

==== Fourth qualifier ====
Qualifying competition
4	(Italy) Diletta Cherubini	6	4	6
	(United States) Eryn Cayetano	2	6	2
