= 2026 Antalya Challenger 3 – Singles =

Singles
- 2026 Antalya Challenger 3

Final
- Champion: (Ukraine) Anhelina Kalinina
- Runner-up: (Slovenia) Tamara Zidanšek
- Score: 6–0, 6–3

Events
Singles	Doubles
- Antalya Challenger

Anhelina Kalinina won the title, defeating Tamara Zidanšek 6–0, 6–3 in the final. Kalinina made history by becoming the first player in WTA 125 history to reach three straight finals, over three consecutive weeks, at the same tournament.

Solana Sierra was the reigning champion, but did not participate this year.

== Seeds ==
1. (Ukraine) Oleksandra Oliynykova (withdrew)
2. (Japan) Moyuka Uchijima (second round)
3. (Austria) Julia Grabher (second round)
4. (Hungary) Panna Udvardy (first round)
5. (Slovenia) Veronika Erjavec (semifinals)
6. (France) Tiantsoa Rakotomanga Rajaonah (first round)
7. (Czech Republic) Dominika Šalková (second round)
8. (Poland) Maja Chwalińska (second round)
9. (Netherlands) Arantxa Rus (first round)

== Draw ==
Key

- Q = Qualifier
- WC = Wild card
- LL = Lucky loser
- Alt = Alternate
- ITF = ITF entry
- PR = Protected ranking
- SR = Special ranking
- SE = Special exempt
- JE = Junior exempt
- JR = Junior Accelerator Programme entrant
- CO = College Accelerator Programme entrant
- NG = Next Gen Accelerator Program entrant
- w/o = Walkover
- r = Retired
- d = Defaulted

=== Finals ===
Semifinals
SE	(Ukraine) Anhelina Kalinina	6	6
(Poland) Katarzyna Kawa	3	4
5	(Slovenia) Veronika Erjavec	0	3
(Slovenia) Tamara Zidanšek	6	6

Final
SE	(Ukraine) Anhelina Kalinina	6	6
(Slovenia) Tamara Zidanšek	0	3

=== Top half ===
First round
9	(Netherlands) A Rus	6^{3}	6	4
(Georgia (country)) E Gorgodze	7^{7}	3	6
SE	(Ukraine) A Kalinina	6	6
Q	E Pridankina	2	1
A Charaeva	6	6
LL	(Bulgaria) L Karatancheva	2	4
(Armenia) E Avanesyan	6	6
6	(France) T Rakotomanga Rajaonah	3	3
4	(Hungary) P Udvardy	3	4
(Spain) L Romero Gormaz	6	6
(Poland) K Kawa	6	6
(Greece) D Papamichail	1	3
Q	(France) C Monnet	6	6
I Shymanovich	0	3
WC	(Turkey) B Cengiz	5	7^{8}	5
7	(Czech Republic) D Šalková	7	6^{6}	7

Second round
(Georgia (country)) E Gorgodze	3	3
SE	(Ukraine) A Kalinina	6	6
A Charaeva	6	6
(Armenia) E Avanesyan	4	1
(Spain) L Romero Gormaz	3	3
(Poland) K Kawa	6	6
Q	(France) C Monnet	6	7^{7}
7	(Czech Republic) D Šalková	3	6^{3}

Quarterfinals
SE	(Ukraine) A Kalinina	7	6
A Charaeva	5	3
(Poland) K Kawa	6	6
Q	(France) C Monnet	4	2

Semifinals
SE	(Ukraine) A Kalinina	6	6
(Poland) K Kawa	3	4

=== Bottom half ===
First round
5	(Slovenia) V Erjavec	6	6
WC	(Turkey) İ Öz	1	1
(Serbia) T Kostović	4	6	7^{7}
Q	(Italy) L Pigato	6	4	6^{3}
(Italy) L Bronzetti	1	5
(Italy) N Brancaccio	6	7
Q	(Japan) M Hontama	4	2
3	(Austria) J Grabher	6	6
8	(Poland) M Chwalińska	6	6
WC	(Turkey) A Kumru	0	0
WC	(Romania) MS Popa	4	6	3
(Slovenia) T Zidanšek	6	3	6
(Uzbekistan) P Kudermetova	6	6
(Spain) G Maristany	4	1
(Argentina) ML Carlé	2	4
2	(Japan) M Uchijima	6	6

Second round
5	(Slovenia) V Erjavec	6	4	6
(Serbia) T Kostović	2	6	4
(Italy) N Brancaccio	3	6	6
3	(Austria) J Grabher	6	3	1
8	(Poland) M Chwalińska	7^{7}	3	6^{7}
(Slovenia) T Zidanšek	6^{1}	6	7^{9}
(Uzbekistan) P Kudermetova	7^{7}	6
2	(Japan) M Uchijima	6^{4}	2

Quarterfinals
5	(Slovenia) V Erjavec	6	6
(Italy) N Brancaccio	4	1
(Slovenia) T Zidanšek	6	1	6
(Uzbekistan) P Kudermetova	3	6	3

Semifinals
5	(Slovenia) V Erjavec	0	3
(Slovenia) T Zidanšek	6	6

== Qualifying ==
=== Seeds ===
1. (Serbia) Teodora Kostović (moved to main draw)
2. Anastasia Gasanova (qualifying competition, retired)
3. (France) Carole Monnet (qualified)
4. (Argentina) Julia Riera (first round)
5. (Italy) Lisa Pigato (qualified)
6. Elena Pridankina (qualified)
7. (Japan) Mai Hontama (qualified)
8. (France) Chloé Paquet (first round)

=== Qualifiers ===
1. (Italy) Lisa Pigato
2. (Japan) Mai Hontama
3. (France) Carole Monnet
4. Elena Pridankina

=== Lucky loser ===
1. (Bulgaria) Lia Karatancheva

=== Qualifying draw ===
==== First qualifier ====
First round
Alt	(Slovenia) Dalila Jakupović	6	0
(Spain) Nuria Párrizas Díaz	4	0^{r}
(Serbia) Mia Ristić	6	6^{5}	4
5	(Italy) Lisa Pigato	4	7^{7}	6

Qualifying competition
Alt	(Slovenia) Dalila Jakupović	3	3
5	(Italy) Lisa Pigato	6	6

==== Second qualifier ====
First round
2	Anastasia Gasanova	6	3	6
(Germany) Caroline Werner	3	6	4
WC	(Turkey) İrem Kurt	5	2
7	(Japan) Mai Hontama	7	6

Qualifying competition
2	Anastasia Gasanova	1	0^{r}
7	(Japan) Mai Hontama	6	2

==== Third qualifier ====
First round
3	(France) Carole Monnet	6	6
WC	(Turkey) Selina Atay	1	0
(Bulgaria) Lia Karatancheva	6	6
8	(France) Chloé Paquet	4	2

Qualifying competition
3	(France) Carole Monnet	6	6
(Bulgaria) Lia Karatancheva	4	3

==== Fourth qualifier ====
First round
4	(Argentina) Julia Riera	5	6	4
(Ukraine) Katarina Zavatska	7	1	6
Ekaterina Reyngold	3	0
6	Elena Pridankina	6	6

Qualifying competition
(Ukraine) Katarina Zavatska	4	4
6	Elena Pridankina	6	6
