= 2026 Antalya Challenger 2 =

- Date: 3 – 8 March
- Edition: 6th
- Category: WTA 125
- Draw: 32S/16D
- Surface: Clay
- Location: Antalya, Turkey

Champions

Singles
- (Ukraine) Anhelina Kalinina

Doubles
- (France) Estelle Cascino / (Argentina) Nicole Fossa Huergo
- Antalya Challenger

The 2026 Antalya Open 2 (also known as the Megasaray Hotels Open for sponsorship reasons) was a professional women's tennis tournament played on outdoor clay courts. It was the sixth edition of the tournament and the second in a series of three WTA 125 tournaments played at the same venue in consecutive weeks in 2026. It took place at the Megasaray Tennis Academy in Antalya, Turkey between 3 and 8 March 2026.

== Singles main-draw entrants ==
=== Seeds ===
Country	Player	Rank^{1}	Seed
UKR	Oleksandra Oliynykova	70	1
HUN	Panna Udvardy	94	2
JPN	Moyuka Uchijima	104	3
SLO	Veronika Erjavec	108	4
EGY	Mayar Sherif	111	5
CZE	Dominika Šalková	130	6
POL	Maja Chwalińska	131	8
NED	Arantxa Rus	133	8

- ^{1} Rankings as of 23 February 2026.

=== Other entrants ===
The following players received wildcards into the singles main draw:

- (Turkey) Berfu Cengiz
- (Turkey) Ada Kumru
- (Latvia) Adelina Lachinova
- (Turkey) İpek Öz

The following players received entry from the qualifying draw:

- (Serbia) Teodora Kostović
- (Italy) Lisa Pigato
- (Serbia) Mia Ristić
- (Ukraine) Katarina Zavatska

=== Withdrawals ===
Before the tournament

- (Czech Republic) Sára Bejlek → replaced by Anastasia Gasanova
- (France) Tiantsoa Rakotomanga Rajaonah → replaced by (France) Carole Monnet

== Doubles main-draw entrants ==
=== Seeds ===
Country	Player	Country	Player	Rank^{1}	Seed
	Maria Kozyreva		Iryna Shymanovich	136	1
CZE	Jesika Malečková	CZE	Miriam Škoch	137	2
CHN	Feng Shuo	BRA	Laura Pigossi	186	3
ITA	Angelica Moratelli	CHN	Tang Qianhui	200	4

- ^{1} Rankings as of 23 February 2026.

=== Other entrants ===
The following pair received a wildcard into the doubles main draw:

- (Turkey) Berfu Cengiz / (Turkey) İpek Öz

== Champions ==
=== Singles ===
- (Ukraine) Anhelina Kalinina def. (Ukraine) Oleksandra Oliynykova 6–3, 3–6, 6–2

=== Doubles ===
- (France) Estelle Cascino / (Argentina) Nicole Fossa Huergo def. (Czech Republic) Jesika Malečková / (Czech Republic) Miriam Škoch 7–5, 7–6^{(8–6)}
