= 2026 Antalya Challenger 3 =

- Date: 10 – 15 March
- Edition: 7th
- Category: WTA 125
- Draw: 32S/16D
- Surface: Clay
- Location: Antalya, Turkey

Champions

Singles
- (Ukraine) Anhelina Kalinina

Doubles
- Maria Kozyreva / Iryna Shymanovich
- Antalya Challenger

The 2026 Antalya Open 3 (also known as the Megasaray Hotels Open for sponsorship reasons) was a professional women's tennis tournament played on outdoor clay courts. It was the seventh edition of the tournament and the third in a series of three WTA 125 tournaments played at the same venue in consecutive weeks in 2026. It took place at the Megasaray Tennis Academy in Antalya, Turkey between 10 and 15 March 2026.

== Singles main-draw entrants ==
=== Seeds ===
Country	Player	Rank^{1}	Seed
~~UKR~~	~~Oleksandra Oliynykova~~	~~73~~	~~1~~
JPN	Moyuka Uchijima	77	2
AUT	Julia Grabher	79	3
HUN	Panna Udvardy	95	4
SLO	Veronika Erjavec	102	5
FRA	Tiantsoa Rakotomanga Rajaonah	129	6
CZE	Dominika Šalková	131	7
POL	Maja Chwalińska	134	8
NED	Arantxa Rus	135	9

- ^{1} Rankings as of 2 March 2026.

=== Other entrants ===
The following players received wildcards into the singles main draw:

- (Turkey) Berfu Cengiz
- (Turkey) Ada Kumru
- (Turkey) İpek Öz
- (Romania) Maria Sara Popa

The following player received entry as a special exempt:

- (Ukraine) Anhelina Kalinina

The following players received entry from the qualifying draw:

- (Japan) Mai Hontama
- (France) Carole Monnet
- (Italy) Lisa Pigato
- Elena Pridankina

The following player received entry as a lucky loser:

- (Bulgaria) Lia Karatancheva

=== Withdrawals ===
Before the tournament

- (Ukraine) Oleksandra Oliynykova → replaced by (Bulgaria) Lia Karatancheva (LL)
- (Spain) Kaitlin Quevedo → replaced by (Spain) Guiomar Maristany
- (Egypt) Mayar Sherif → replaced by (Serbia) Teodora Kostović

== Doubles main-draw entrants ==
=== Seeds ===
Country	Player	Country	Player	Rank^{1}	Seed
	Maria Kozyreva		Iryna Shymanovich	131	1
BEL	Magali Kempen		Elena Pridankina	159	2
CZE	Anastasia Dețiuc	CZE	Dominika Šalková	212	3
GBR	Alicia Barnett	FRA	Elixane Lechemia	232	4

- ^{1} Rankings as of 2 March 2026.

=== Other entrants ===
The following pairs received wildcards into the doubles main draw:

- (Turkey) Selina Atay / (Bulgaria) Dia Evtimova
- (Turkey) Deniz Çakıl / Ekaterina Khodzhaeva

=== Retirements ===
- (France) Carole Monnet / (Netherlands) Arantxa Rus (Rus - right calf injury)

== Champions ==
=== Singles ===
- (Ukraine) Anhelina Kalinina def. (Slovenia) Tamara Zidanšek 6–0, 6–3

=== Doubles ===
- Maria Kozyreva / Iryna Shymanovich def. (Poland) Maja Chwalińska / (Czech Republic) Jesika Malečková 7–6^{(9–7)}, 6–4
