= Anhelina Kalinina =

Ukrainian tennis player (born 1997)

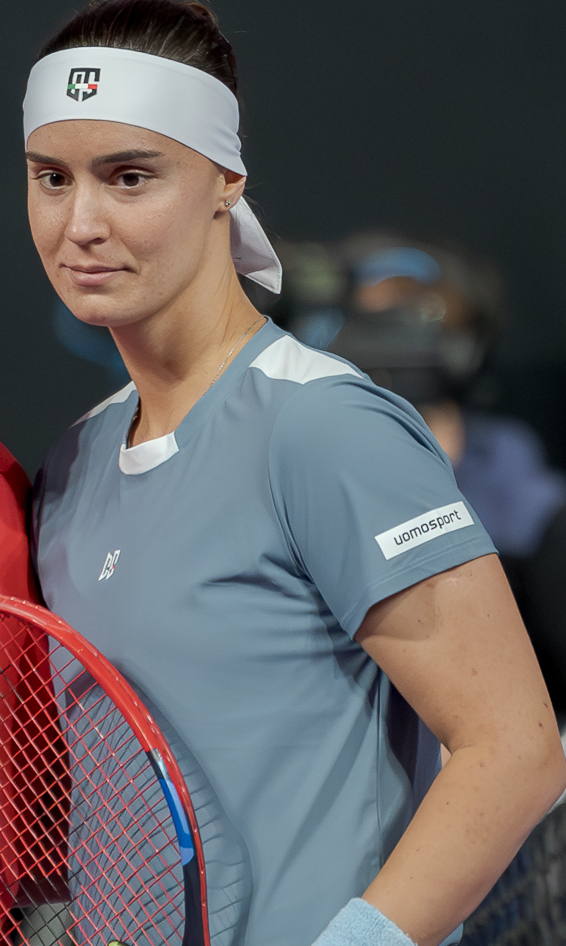
- Kalinina at the 2025 Transylvania Open
- Full name: Anhelina Serhiyivna Kalinina
- Native name: Ангеліна Сергіївна Калініна
- Country (sports): Ukraine
- Born: 7 February 1997 (age 29) Nova Kakhovka, Ukraine
- Height: 1.80 m (5 ft 11 in)
- Plays: Right-handed (two-handed backhand)
- Coach: Anton Korchevskyi
- Prize money: US$ 5,210,025

Singles
- Career record: 420–252
- Career titles: 4 WTA 125
- Highest ranking: No. 25 (22 May 2023)
- Current ranking: No. 56 (9 November 2026)

Grand Slam singles results
- Australian Open: 3R (2023)
- French Open: 2R (2021, 2022, 2025)
- Wimbledon: 2R (2022, 2023)
- US Open: 2R (2018, 2021, 2022, 2024)

Doubles
- Career record: 72–71
- Career titles: 3 ITF
- Highest ranking: No. 92 (27 January 2025)
- Current ranking: No. 113 (9 November 2026)

Grand Slam doubles results
- Australian Open: 3R (2023)
- French Open: 3R (2026)
- Wimbledon: 2R (2023, 2026)
- US Open: 3R (2026)
Medal record
Representing a Mixed-NOCs team
Youth Olympic Games
Gold medal – first place	2014 Nanjing	Girls' doubles
- Last updated on: 9 November 2026.

Anhelina Serhiyivna Kalinina (Ukrainian: Ангеліна Сергіївна Калініна [ɐnɦeˈl⁽ʲ⁾inɐ serˈɦijiu̯nɐ kɐˈl⁽ʲ⁾in⁽ʲ⁾inɐ]; born 7 February 1997) is a Ukrainian professional tennis player. On 22 May 2023, she reached her career-high WTA singles ranking of No. 25. On 27 January 2025, she peaked at No. 92 in the doubles rankings. Kalinina has won four singles titles on WTA 125 tournaments, as well as 15 titles in singles and three in doubles on the ITF World Tennis Tour.

== Early life ==
She was born into a sporting family. Her mother, Halina Kalinina, was her coach. She took up tennis at age five, encouraged by her grandmother.

She lived in Moscow for a while due to her parents' busy schedules. In 2008, the Kalinin family moved permanently to Kyiv. Anhelina was given the opportunity to train on the courts of the Aquarium.

== Career ==
=== Juniors ===
In 2014, Kalinina partnering with Elizaveta Kulichkova won the girls' doubles tournament at the Australian Open, defeating Katie Boulter and Ivana Jorović in the final. Later that year, she reached the final of the Junior US Open, losing to Marie Bouzková in straight sets.

=== 2018: Major debut ===
At the 2018 US Open, Kalinina made her singles main-draw debut in a Grand Slam tournament, after winning three matches in the qualifying. She defeated Elena-Gabriela Ruse in the first qualifying round, Tereza Martincová in round two, and finally Jaimee Fourlis, also in straight sets, and went on to win a major match by beating Kathinka von Deichmann, in three sets, but then lost to Sloane Stephens.

=== 2021: WTA Tour final, top 100 ===
At the French Open, she reached the second round as a qualifier, defeating 26th seed and three-time major champion, Angelique Kerber.

Although Kalinina fell in the last round of the Wimbledon qualifying, she won the 60k Montpellier and 100k Contrexéville trophies over the next two weeks to take her 2021 ITF Circuit title haul to four. She reached the final of the Budapest Grand Prix losing there to top seed Yulia Putintseva. With a record for the 2021 season of 32–7, she moved 30 ranking spots from world No. 125 to No. 95.

=== 2022: WTA 1000 quarterfinal and top 35, Ukrainian No. 1 ===
Kalinina made her debut in the top 50 at world No. 49 on 17 January 2022, after reaching the round of 16 at the Miami Open, before retiring hurt against 16th seed Jessica Pegula. As a result, Kalinina reached a new career-high ranking of world No. 42.

At the Eastbourne International, she defeated world No. 5 and third seed, Maria Sakkari, in the second round. As a result, she reached world No. 34 and became the number-one Ukrainian tennis player ahead of Elina Svitolina.

Kalinina won her first WTA 125 title in December at the Open de Limoges, defeating Clara Tauson in the final.

=== 2023: Major third round, WTA 1000 final, top 25 ===
Kalinina started her season at the Adelaide International 1. Getting past qualifying, she was eliminated in the first round by Victoria Azarenka. Seeded fifth at the Hobart International, she reached the quarterfinals where she was defeated by 2019 champion Sofia Kenin. At the Australian Open, she upset 15th seed, two-time Grand Slam champion, and 2019 finalist, Petra Kvitová, in the second round. She lost in the third round to 20th seed, 2021 French Open champion, and last year quarterfinalist, Barbora Krejčíková.

Seeded fourth at the Upper Austria Ladies Linz, Kalinina lost in the second round to qualifier Anna-Lena Friedsam. In Doha, she fell in the first round of qualifying to Lauren Davis.

At the Dubai Championships, she stunned tenth seed and top-20 player, Veronika Kudermetova, in the first round for her second top-20 win of the season, after her second-round win at the Australian Open against 15th seed Petra Kvitová, and sixth in total. Following a round of 16 showing, with a win over qualifier and compatriot Dayana Yastremska, she reached the top 30 at world No. 29, on 27 February 2023.

Ranked No. 47 at the Italian Open, she had reached the semifinals of a WTA 1000 for the first time in her career, after defeating former world No. 4, Sofia Kenin, 19th seed Madison Keys, and 12th seed Beatriz Haddad Maia in the longest match of the season, lasting 3 hours and 41 minutes. She reached her maiden WTA 1000 final and only second of her career, in another long match lasting almost three hours, toppling again Veronika Kudermetova. She became the lowest-ranked woman to reach the final in Rome since Raffaella Reggi in 1985 and the second Ukrainian on this stage at a WTA 1000 since former world No. 3, Elina Svitolina. As a result, she peaked at No. 25 in the singles rankings.

=== 2024: Two WTA Tour semifinals, WTA 1000 fourth round ===
At the Miami Open, she reached the fourth round of a WTA 1000 event for a fourth time, defeating world No. 2, Aryna Sabalenka, for only the second top-5 win of her career.

Kalinina made the last four at the Rouen Open with a quarterfinal win over fifth seed Mirra Andreeva, before losing in the third set to Magda Linette. She also reached the semifinals at the Strasbourg Open, defeating top seed Markéta Vondroušová in three sets in the quarterfinals but missing out on a place in the final at the hands of Danielle Collins. At the Prague Open, she made it through to the quarterfinals with a round-of-16 win against Elsa Jacquemot before losing to Magdalena Fręch.

Kalinina qualified for the Paris Olympics but withdrew from the competition on 28 July, after catching a cold. At the US Open, she defeated Océane Dodin to reach the second round, where she lost to 27th seed Elina Svitolina.

=== 2025: Brisbane semifinal, second WTA 125 title ===
Kalinina started her season at the Brisbane International, where she reached the semifinals with wins over Wang Yafan, fifth seed Diana Shnaider, Yuan Yue and wildcard entrant Kimberly Birrell. She lost in the last four to qualifier Polina Kudermetova. Seeded fourth at the Transylvania Open, Kalinina defeated wildcard entrant Elena-Gabriela Ruse and Suzan Lamens to make it through to the quarterfinals, where she was eliminated by lucky loser Aliaksandra Sasnovich.

Having missed six months of the season for unspecified reasons, Kalinina returned to competitive tennis in December at the Open de Limoges, where she won her second WTA 125 title, defeating Elsa Jacquemot in the final. As a result she returned to No. 127 in the singles rankings on 15 December 2025, up 28 spots.

=== 2026: Record consecutive three WTA 125 finals and two titles, ATP final ===
At the Megasaray Hotels Open in Antalya, Turkiye second edition, Kalinina reached a consecutive final and won her second WTA 125 title in three months, defeating compatriot Oleksandra Oliynykova in the final.

In the third edition of the same Antalya event, Kalinina reached her third straight final defeating Katarzyna Kawa. A finalist in three tournaments over three consecutive weeks, Kalinina made history becoming the first player to achieve the feat on the WTA 125 tour. She won her second consecutive 125 title defeating Tamara Zidanšek, in straight sets. At the Morocco Open in Rabat, Kalinina reached the final with straight-sets wins over two Hungarian seeded players, fifth seed Anna Bondár and seventh seed Panna Udvardy.

== Coaches ==
Previously, she worked with Vladimir Platenik (2018-2019) and Dinara Safina (2017). During her junior years, she was coached by Dmitry Mazur.

Since 2021, Kalinina's coach has been her husband, Anton Korchevsky.

== Performance timelines ==
Key
W	F	SF	QF	#R	RR	Q#	DNQ	A	NH

(W) winner; (F) finalist; (SF) semifinalist; (QF) quarterfinalist; (#R) rounds 4, 3, 2, 1; (RR) round-robin stage; (Q#) qualification round; (DNQ) did not qualify; (A) absent; (NH) not held; (SR) strike rate (events won / competed); (W–L) win–loss record.
To avoid confusion and double counting, these charts are updated at the conclusion of a tournament or when the player's participation has ended.

Only main-draw results in WTA Tour, Grand Slam tournaments, Billie Jean King Cup (Fed Cup), United Cup, Hopman Cup and Olympic Games are included in Win–Loss records.

=== Singles ===
Current through the 2026 Wuhan Open.

Tournament	2015	2016	2017	2018	2019	2020	2021	2022	2023	2024	2025	2026	SR	W–L	Win%
Grand Slam tournaments
Australian Open	A	A	A	A	Q2	Q1	Q2	1R	3R	1R	1R	1R	0 / 5	2–5	29%
French Open	A	A	Q1	Q2	Q2	Q2	2R	2R	1R	1R	2R	1R	0 / 6	3–6	33%
Wimbledon	Q1	A	A	Q1	Q2	NH	Q3	2R	2R	1R	A	1R	0 / 4	2–4	33%
US Open	Q1	Q1	Q2	2R	Q1	1R	2R	2R (Note: Withdrawal during the tournament – not counted as a loss)	1R	2R	A	1R	0 / 7	4–6	40%
Win–Loss	0–0	0–0	0–0	1–1	0–0	0–1	2–2	3–3	3–4	1–4	1–2	0–4	0 / 22	11–21	34%
WTA 1000 tournaments
Qatar Open	NTI	A	NTI	A	NTI	A	NTI	A	NTI	2R	1R	A	0 / 2	0–2	0%
Dubai Championships	A	NTI	A	NTI	Q2	NTI	A	NTI	3R	1R	1R	A	0 / 3	2–3	40%
Indian Wells Open	A	A	A	A	A	NH	1R	2R	3R	2R	1R	A	0 / 5	2–5	29%
Miami Open	A	A	A	A	A	NH	A	4R	2R	4R	1R	A	0 / 4	5–4	56%
Madrid Open	A	A	A	A	A	NH	A	QF	2R	2R	A	3R	0 / 4	3–4	43%
Italian Open	A	A	A	A	A	A	A	2R	F	3R	A	2R	0 / 4	6–3	67%
Canadian Open	A	A	A	A	A	NH	A	1R	1R	A	A	1R	0 / 3	0–3	0%
Cincinnati Open	A	A	A	A	A	A	A	1R	2R	1R	A	2R	0 / 4	2–4	33%
China Open	A	A	A	A	A	Not Held			3R	1R	A	1R	0 / 3	2–3	40%
Wuhan Open	A	A	A	A	A	Not Held				A	A	1R	0 / 1	0–1	0%
Guadalajara Open	Not Held							A	2R	Not Tier I			0 / 1	1–1	50%
Win–Loss	0–0	0–0	0–0	0–0	0–0	0–0	0–1	8–5	12–9	4–8	0–4	3–6	0 / 34	27–33	45%
Career statistics
	2015	2016	2017	2018	2019	2020	2021	2022	2023	2024	2025	2026	SR	W–L	Win%
Tournaments	1	0	0	2	2	2	9	21	25	24	12	4	Career total: 102		
Titles	0	0	0	0	0	0	0	0	0	0	0	0	Career total: 0		
Finals	0	0	0	0	0	0	1	0	1	0	0	0	Career total: 2		
Hard win–loss	0–1	0–0	0–0	1–2	0–0	0–2	6–6	8–10	19–16	8–14	7–9	1–3	0 / 67	50–63	44%
Clay win–loss	0–0	0–0	0–0	0–0	1–2	0–0	5–2	8–5	5–4	10–7	2–3	3–3	0 / 26	34–26	57%
Grass win–loss	0–0	0–0	0–0	0–0	0–0	0–0	0–0	5–4	3–4	2–3	0–0	0–0	0 / 11	10–11	48%
Overall win–loss	0–1	0–0	0–0	1–2	1–2	0–2	11–8	21–19	27–24	20–24	9–12	4–6	0 / 104	94–100	48%
Year-end ranking (Note: 2013: WTA ranking–561, 2014: WTA ranking–268.)	148	527	157	110	181	162	52	52	27	57	157		$5,146,090		

=== Doubles ===
Tournament	2021	2022	2023	2024	2025	SR	W–L
Grand Slam tournaments
Australian Open	A	1R	3R	1R	2R	0 / 4	3–4
French Open	A	1R	1R	1R	1R	0 / 4	0–4
Wimbledon	A	1R	2R	1R	A	0 / 3	1–3
US Open	2R	A	1R	1R	A	0 / 3	1–3
Win–Loss	1–1	0–3	3–4	0–4	1–2	0 / 14	5–14

== Significant finals ==
=== WTA 1000 tournaments ===
==== Singles: 1 (runner-up) ====
Result	Year	Tournament	Surface	Opponent	Score
Loss	2023	Italian Open	Clay	(Kazakhstan) Elena Rybakina	4–6, 0–1 ret.

== WTA Tour finals ==
=== Singles: 3 (3 runner-ups) ===
Legend WTA 1000 (0–1) WTA 250 (0–2)	Finals by surface Clay (0–3)

Result	W–L	Date	Tournament	Tier	Surface	Opponent	Score
Loss	0–1	Jul 2021	Budapest Grand Prix, Hungary	WTA 250	Clay	(Kazakhstan) Yulia Putintseva	4–6, 0–6
Loss	0–2	May 2023	Internazionali d'Italia, Italy	WTA 1000	Clay	(Kazakhstan) Elena Rybakina	4–6, 0–1 ret.
Loss	0–3	May 2026	Rabat Grand Prix, Morocco	WTA 250	Clay	(Croatia) Petra Marčinko	2–6, 0–3 ret.

== WTA 125 finals ==
=== Singles: 6 (4 titles, 2 runner-ups) ===
Result	W–L	Date	Tournament	Surface	Opponent	Score
Win	1–0	Dec 2022	Open de Limoges, France	Hard (i)	(Denmark) Clara Tauson	6–3, 5–7, 6–4
Win	2–0	Dec 2025	Open de Limoges, France (2)	Hard (i)	(France) Elsa Jacquemot	6–3, 4–6, 7–5
Loss	2–1	Feb 2026	Antalya Challenger, Turkiye	Clay	(Japan) Moyuka Uchijima	5–7, 5–7
Win	3–1	Mar 2026	Antalya Challenger 2, Turkiye	Clay	(Ukraine) Oleksandra Oliynykova	6–3, 3–6, 6–2
Win	4–1	Mar 2026	Antalya Challenger 3, Turkiye (2)	Clay	(Slovenia) Tamara Zidanšek	6–0, 6–3
Loss	4–2	Mar 2026	Dubrovnik Open, Croatia	Clay	(Spain) Andrea Lázaro García	6–3, 4–6, 3–6

== ITF Circuit finals ==
=== Singles: 24 (15 titles, 9 runner-ups) ===
Legend $100,000 tournaments (1–1) $80,000 tournaments (0–1) $50/60,000 tournaments (4–1) $25,000 tournaments (10–6)	Finals by surface Hard (2–6) Clay (13–2) Carpet (0–1)

Result	W–L	Date	Tournament	Tier	Surface	Opponent	Score
Loss	0–1	Oct 2013	ITF Istanbul, Turkey	25,000	Hard (i)	(Russia) Ksenia Pervak	0–6, 5–7
Loss	0–2	Nov 2013	ITF Bucha, Ukraine	25,000	Carpet (i)	(Russia) Polina Vinogradova	6–4, 3–6, 4–6
Loss	0–3	Mar 2014	ITF Jackson, United States	25,000	Clay	(Norway) Ulrikke Eikeri	2–6, 4–6
Loss	0–4	Nov 2014	ITF Équeurdreville, France	25,000	Hard (i)	(France) Stéphanie Foretz	2–5 ret.
Win	1–4	Apr 2015	ITF Jackson, United States	25,000	Clay	(United Kingdom) Johanna Konta	6–3, 6–4
Win	2–4	Apr 2015	ITF Pelham, United States	25,000	Clay	(Germany) Laura Siegemund	6–3, 7–5
Win	3–4	Jul 2015	Sacramento Challenger, US	50,000	Hard	(Belgium) An-Sophie Mestach	4–6, 6–4, 6–3
Loss	3–5	Nov 2015	Slovak Open, Slovakia	25,000	Hard (i)	(Czech Republic) Jesika Malečková	6–4, 6–7^{(3)}, 4–6
Win	4–5	Jan 2017	ITF Daytona Beach, US	25,000	Clay	(United States) Elizabeth Halbauer	6–1, 6–2
Win	5–5	Jan 2017	ITF Wesley Chapel, US	25,000	Clay	(Ukraine) Elizaveta Ianchuk	6–4, 6–4
Win	6–5	Jul 2017	ITF Darmstadt, Germany	25,000	Clay	(United States) Bernarda Pera	6–2, 0–6, 6–3
Win	7–5	Jan 2018	ITF Daytona Beach, US	25,000	Clay	(United States) Grace Min	1–6, 7–5, 6–0
Win	8–5	Jan 2018	ITF Orlando, US	25,000	Clay	(Austria) Julia Grabher	6–2, 3–6, 7–5
Win	9–5	Apr 2018	ITF Jackson, US	25,000	Clay	(Italy) Gaia Sanesi	6–0, 6–1
Loss	9–6	Apr 2018	Charlottesville Open, US	80,000	Clay	(Colombia) Mariana Duque Mariño	6–0, 1–6, 2–6
Win	10–6	Jun 2019	Zubr Cup, Czech Republic	W25	Clay	(Bulgaria) Elitsa Kostova	6–1, 4–6, 6–1
Loss	10–7	Oct 2019	ITF Dallas, US	W25	Hard	(United States) Jamie Loeb	0–6, 7–6^{(3)}, 0–6
Loss	10–8	Nov 2019	Las Vegas Open, US	W60	Hard	(Japan) Mayo Hibi	2–6, 7–5, 2–6
Loss	10–9	Feb 2020	Midland Tennis Classic, US	W100	Hard (i)	(United States) Shelby Rogers	w/o
Win	11–9	Apr 2021	ITF Oeiras, Portugal	W25	Clay	(South Korea) Jang Su-jeong	6–4, 4–6, 6–4
Win	12–9	Apr 2021	Zagreb Ladies Open, Croatia	W60	Clay	(Russia) Kamilla Rakhimova	6–1, 6–3
Win	13–9	Jul 2021	Open de Montpellier, France	W60	Clay	(Egypt) Mayar Sherif	6–2, 6–3
Win	14–9	Jul 2021	Contrexéville Open, France	W100	Clay	(Hungary) Dalma Gálfi	6–2, 6–2
Win	15–9	Nov 2021	Open Nantes Atlantique, France	W60	Hard (i)	(France) Océane Dodin	7–6^{(4)}, 1–0 ret.

=== Doubles: 6 (3 titles, 3 runner-ups) ===
Legend $80,000 tournaments $60,000 tournaments (1–1) $25,000 tournaments (2–2)	Finals by surface Hard (0–1) Clay (2–1) Carpet (1–1)

Result	W–L	Date	Tournament	Tier	Surface	Partner	Opponents	Score
Loss	0–1	Nov 2013	ITF Bucha, Ukraine	25,000	Carpet (i)	(Russia) Elizaveta Kulichkova	(Georgia (country)) Sofia Shapatava (Ukraine) Anastasiya Vasylyeva	6–7^{(4)}, 2–6
Win	1–1	Nov 2014	ITF Zawada, Poland	25,000	Carpet (i)	(Ukraine) Anna Shkudun	(Czech Republic) Gabriela Chmelinová (Czech Republic) Karolína Muchová	6–0, 7–6^{(3)}
Win	2–1	Mar 2015	ITF Osprey Pro, US	60,000	Clay	(Ukraine) Oleksandra Korashvili	(Paraguay) Verónica Cepede Royg (Argentina) María Irigoyen	6–1, 6–4
Win	3–1	Jan 2017	ITF Daytona Beach, United States	25,000	Clay	(United States) Robin Anderson	(Poland) Paula Kania (Poland) Katarzyna Piter	6–4, 6–1
Loss	3–2	Feb 2017	Rancho Santa Fe Open, US	25,000	Hard	(United States) Chiara Scholl	(United States) Kayla Day (United States) Caroline Dolehide	3–6, 6–1, [7–10]
Loss	3–3	Jun 2019	Bella Cup, Poland	W60+H	Clay	(United States) Robin Anderson	(Spain) Rebeka Masarova (Slovakia) Rebecca Šramková	4–6, 6–3, [4–10]

== Junior Grand Slam tournament finals ==
=== Singles: 1 (runner-up) ===
Result	Year	Tournament	Surface	Opponent	Score
Loss	2014	US Open	Hard	(Czech Republic) Marie Bouzková	4–6, 6–7^{(5)}

=== Doubles: 2 (1 title, 1 runner-up) ===
Result	Year	Tournament	Surface	Partner	Opponents	Score
Loss	2013	Wimbledon	Grass	(Belarus) Iryna Shymanovich	(Czech Republic) Barbora Krejčíková (Czech Republic) Kateřina Siniaková	3–6, 1–6
Win	2014	Australian Open	Hard	(Russia) Elizaveta Kulichkova	(United Kingdom) Katie Boulter (Serbia) Ivana Jorović	6–4, 6–2

== Wins against top 10 players ==
- She has a 5–9 (31%) record against players who were, at the time the match was played, ranked in the top 10.

No.	Player	Rk	Event	Surface	Rd	Score	Rk	Years	Ref
1	(Spain) Garbiñe Muguruza	9	Madrid Open, Spain	Clay	2R	6–3, 6–0	37	2022	
2	(Greece) Maria Sakkari	5	Eastbourne International, UK	Grass	2R	3–6, 7–5, 6–4	36	2022	
3	(Czech Republic) Markéta Vondroušová	8	China Open, China	Hard	1R	1–6, 6–4, 6–1	28	2023	
4	Aryna Sabalenka	2	Miami Open, United States	Hard	3R	6–4, 1–6, 6–1	36	2024	
5	(Czech Republic) Markéta Vondroušová	6	Internationaux de Strasbourg, France	Clay	QF	5–7, 6–3, 6–2	56	2024	

- Key: (Rk) first use, opponent rank; (Rd) round; (Rk) 2nd use, player rank; (Ref) reference; (F) final; (SF) semifinal; (QF) quarterfinal; (#R) rounds 4, 3, 2, 1; (RR) round-robin stage; (Q#) qualifying rounds or stages (3), 2, 1.
