= 2026 Antalya Challenger 2 – Singles =

Singles
- 2026 Antalya Challenger 2

Final
- Champion: (Ukraine) Anhelina Kalinina
- Runner-up: (Ukraine) Oleksandra Oliynykova
- Score: 6–3, 3–6, 6–2

Events
Singles	Doubles
- Antalya Challenger

Olga Danilović was the defending champion, but chose not to participate this year.

Anhelina Kalinina won the title, defeating Oleksandra Oliynykova 6–3, 3–6, 6–2 in the final.

== Seeds ==
1. (Ukraine) Oleksandra Oliynykova (final)
2. (Hungary) Panna Udvardy (quarterfinals)
3. (Japan) Moyuka Uchijima (semifinals)
4. (Slovenia) Veronika Erjavec (first round)
5. (Egypt) Mayar Sherif (first round)
6. (Czech Republic) Dominika Šalková (first round)
7. (Poland) Maja Chwalińska (quarterfinals)
8. (Netherlands) Arantxa Rus (first round)

== Draw ==
Key

- Q = Qualifier
- WC = Wild card
- LL = Lucky loser
- Alt = Alternate
- ITF = ITF entry
- PR = Protected ranking
- SR = Special ranking
- SE = Special exempt
- JE = Junior exempt
- JR = Junior Accelerator Programme entrant
- CO = College Accelerator Programme entrant
- NG = Next Gen Accelerator Program entrant
- w/o = Walkover
- r = Retired
- d = Defaulted

=== Finals ===
Semifinals
1	(Ukraine) Oleksandra Oliynykova	6	6
3	(Japan) Moyuka Uchijima	4	4
(Poland) Katarzyna Kawa	5	2
(Ukraine) Anhelina Kalinina	7	6

Final
1	(Ukraine) Oleksandra Oliynykova	3	6	2
(Ukraine) Anhelina Kalinina	6	3	6

=== Top half ===
First round
1	(Ukraine) O Oliynykova	2	6	6
(Italy) N Brancaccio	6	3	0
I Shymanovich	6	6
Q	(Italy) L Pigato	2	4
(Argentina) J Riera	7^{8}	4	6
Q	(Serbia) T Kostović	6^{6}	6	3
(Spain) G Maristany	6	7
8	(Netherlands) A Rus	1	5
3	(Japan) M Uchijima	6	6
WC	(Turkey) A Kumru	4	0
WC	(Turkey) B Cengiz	4	4
(Italy) L Bronzetti	6	6
(Greece) D Papamichail	6	6
Q	(Serbia) M Ristić	4	2
WC	(Latvia) A Lachinova	1	3
7	(Poland) M Chwalińska	6	6

Second round
1	(Ukraine) O Oliynykova	7	6
I Shymanovich	5	1
(Argentina) J Riera	5	6	3
(Spain) G Maristany	7	1	6
3	(Japan) M Uchijima	6	6
(Italy) L Bronzetti	4	4
(Greece) D Papamichail	2	0
7	(Poland) M Chwalińska	6	6

Quarterfinals
1	(Ukraine) O Oliynykova	1	6	7
(Spain) G Maristany	6	0	5
3	(Japan) M Uchijima	2	6	7
7	(Poland) M Chwalińska	6	3	5

Semifinals
1	(Ukraine) O Oliynykova	6	6
3	(Japan) M Uchijima	4	4

=== Bottom half ===
First round
5	(Egypt) M Sherif	3	6	2
(Poland) K Kawa	6	1	6
WC	(Turkey) İ Öz	6	6
Q	(Ukraine) K Zavatska	0	1
(Spain) L Romero Gormaz	6	4	6
(France) C Monnet	0	6	4
(Slovenia) T Zidanšek	7	4	7^{7}
4	(Slovenia) V Erjavec	5	6	6^{3}
6	(Czech Republic) D Šalková	1	4
(Armenia) E Avanesyan	6	6
(Ukraine) A Kalinina	6	4	6
(Georgia (country)) E Gorgodze	3	6	3
A Charaeva	5	4
(Uzbekistan) P Kudermetova	7	6
A Gasanova	3	3
2	(Hungary) P Udvardy	6	6

Second round
(Poland) K Kawa	6	6
WC	(Turkey) İ Öz	4	0
(Spain) L Romero Gormaz	3	5
(Slovenia) T Zidanšek	6	7
(Armenia) E Avanesyan	1	6^{5}
(Ukraine) A Kalinina	6	7^{7}
(Uzbekistan) P Kudermetova	4	6^{4}
2	(Hungary) P Udvardy	6	7^{7}

Quarterfinals
(Poland) K Kawa	6	6
(Slovenia) T Zidanšek	1	4
(Ukraine) A Kalinina	7^{7}	7
2	(Hungary) P Udvardy	6^{3}	5

Semifinals
(Poland) K Kawa	5	2
(Ukraine) A Kalinina	7	6

== Qualifying ==
=== Seeds ===
1. (Serbia) Teodora Kostović (qualified)
2. Elena Pridankina (qualifying competition)
3. (Italy) Lisa Pigato (qualified)
4. (France) Alice Ramé (first round)
5. (Brazil) Laura Pigossi (qualifying competition)
6. (Japan) Mai Hontama (first round)
7. (Germany) Caroline Werner (first round)
8. (Hungary) Amarissa Tóth (first round)

=== Qualifiers ===
1. (Serbia) Teodora Kostović
2. (Serbia) Mia Ristić
3. (Italy) Lisa Pigato
4. (Ukraine) Katarina Zavatska

=== Qualifying draw ===
==== First qualifier ====
First round
1	(Serbia) Teodora Kostović	6	6
(Bulgaria) Lia Karatancheva	1	2
Alevtina Ibragimova	6	3	4
5	(Brazil) Laura Pigossi	4	6	6

Qualifying competition
1	(Serbia) Teodora Kostović	6	6
5	(Brazil) Laura Pigossi	2	3

==== Second qualifier ====
First round
2	Elena Pridankina	6	6
WC	(Armenia) Ani Amiraghyan	2	3
(Serbia) Mia Ristić	6	6
6	(Japan) Mai Hontama	2	2

Qualifying competition
2	Elena Pridankina	3	1
(Serbia) Mia Ristić	6	6

==== Third qualifier ====
First round
3	(Italy) Lisa Pigato	6	4
(Ukraine) Anastasiia Sobolieva	2	1^{r}
Anastasia Zolotareva	6	6
8	(Hungary) Amarissa Tóth	3	2

Qualifying competition
3	(Italy) Lisa Pigato	6	4	6
Anastasia Zolotareva	2	6	0

==== Fourth qualifier ====
First round
4	(France) Alice Ramé	6^{7}	1
WC	(Turkey) Berrak Kocak	7^{9}	6
(Ukraine) Katarina Zavatska	4	7^{7}	6
7	(Germany) Caroline Werner	6	6^{2}	3

Qualifying competition
WC	(Turkey) Berrak Kocak	3	2
(Ukraine) Katarina Zavatska	6	6
