= 2026 Antalya Challenger 3 – Doubles =

Doubles
- 2026 Antalya Challenger 3

Final
- Champions: Maria Kozyreva; Iryna Shymanovich
- Runners-up: (Poland) Maja Chwalińska (Czech Republic) Jesika Malečková
- Score: 7–6^{(9–7)}, 6–4

Events
| Singles | Doubles |
- Antalya Challenger

Anna Bondár and Simona Waltert were the reigning champions, but chose not to participate.

Maria Kozyreva and Iryna Shymanovich won the title, defeating Maja Chwalińska and Jesika Malečková 7–6^{(9–7)}, 6–4 in the final.

== Seeds ==
1. Maria Kozyreva / Iryna Shymanovich (champions)
2. (Belgium) Magali Kempen / Elena Pridankina (quarterfinals)
3. (Czech Republic) Anastasia Dețiuc / (Czech Republic) Dominika Šalková (first round)
4. (United Kingdom) Alicia Barnett / (France) Elixane Lechemia (first round)

== Draw ==
Key

- Q = Qualifier
- WC = Wild card
- LL = Lucky loser
- Alt = Alternate
- ITF = ITF entry
- PR = Protected ranking
- SR = Special ranking
- SE = Special exempt
- JE = Junior exempt
- JR = Junior Accelerator Programme entrant
- CO = College Accelerator Programme entrant
- NG = Next Gen Accelerator Program entrant
- w/o = Walkover
- r = Retired
- d = Defaulted

=== Draw ===
First round
1 | M Kozyreva; I Shymanovich | 6 | 6
WC | (Turkey) S Atay (Bulgaria) D Evtimova | 3 | 2
(Slovenia) D Jakupović (Slovenia) N Radišić | 6 | 6
WC | (Turkey) D Çakıl; E Khodzhaeva | 2 | 2
4 | (United Kingdom) A Barnett (France) E Lechemia | 1 | 2
(Georgia (country)) E Gorgodze (Turkey) İ Öz | 6 | 6
I Khromacheva; K Zaytseva | 7^{8} | 6
E Ovcharenko (France) T Rakotomanga Rajaonah | 6^{6} | 2
(Bulgaria) L Karatancheva (Germany) C Werner | 4 | 2
(France) C Monnet (Netherlands) A Rus | 6 | 6
(Poland) M Chwalińska (Czech Republic) J Malečková | 6 | 4 | [10]
3 | (Czech Republic) A Dețiuc (Czech Republic) D Šalková | 3 | 6 | [2]
(Argentina) ML Carlé (Spain) Y Cavallé Reimers | 6 | 6
(Armenia) A Amiraghyan (Turkey) A Kumru | 4 | 3
(Slovenia) V Erjavec (Hungary) P Udvardy | 6 | 3 | [8]
2 | (Belgium) M Kempen; E Pridankina | 3 | 6 | [10]

Quarterfinals
1 | M Kozyreva; I Shymanovich | 0 | 6 | [10]
(Slovenia) D Jakupović (Slovenia) N Radišić | 6 | 3 | [8]
(Georgia (country)) E Gorgodze (Turkey) İ Öz | 3 | 6^{0}
I Khromacheva; K Zaytseva | 6 | 7^{7}
(France) C Monnet (Netherlands) A Rus | 4 | 0^{r}
(Poland) M Chwalińska (Czech Republic) J Malečková | 6 | 0
(Argentina) ML Carlé (Spain) Y Cavallé Reimers | 2 | 7^{10} | [10]
2 | (Belgium) M Kempen; E Pridankina | 6 | 6^{8} | [4]

Semifinals
1 | M Kozyreva; I Shymanovich | 3 | 6 | [10]
I Khromacheva; K Zaytseva | 6 | 4 | [5]
(Poland) M Chwalińska (Czech Republic) J Malečková | 6 | 6^{2} | [11]
(Argentina) ML Carlé (Spain) Y Cavallé Reimers | 1 | 7^{7} | [9]

Final
1 | M Kozyreva; I Shymanovich | 7^{9} | 6
(Poland) M Chwalińska (Czech Republic) J Malečková | 6^{7} | 4
