= 2026 Antalya Challenger 2 – Doubles =

Doubles
- 2026 Antalya Challenger 2

Final
- Champions: (France) Estelle Cascino (Argentina) Nicole Fossa Huergo
- Runners-up: (Czech Republic) Jesika Malečková (Czech Republic) Miriam Škoch
- Score: 7–5, 7–6^{(8–6)}

Events
Singles	Doubles
- Antalya Challenger

María Lourdes Carlé and Simona Waltert were the defending champions, but chose not to participate.

Estelle Cascino and Nicole Fossa Huergo won the title, defeating Jesika Malečková and Miriam Škoch 7–5, 7–6^{(8–6)} in the final.

== Seeds ==
1. Maria Kozyreva / Iryna Shymanovich (semifinals)
2. (Czech Republic) Jesika Malečková / (Czech Republic) Miriam Škoch (final)
3. (China) Feng Shuo / (Brazil) Laura Pigossi (first round)
4. (Italy) Angelica Moratelli / (China) Tang Qianhui (first round)

== Draw ==
Key

- Q = Qualifier
- WC = Wild card
- LL = Lucky loser
- Alt = Alternate
- ITF = ITF entry
- PR = Protected ranking
- SR = Special ranking
- SE = Special exempt
- JE = Junior exempt
- JR = Junior Accelerator Programme entrant
- CO = College Accelerator Programme entrant
- NG = Next Gen Accelerator Program entrant
- w/o = Walkover
- r = Retired
- d = Defaulted

=== Draw ===
First round
1	M Kozyreva; I Shymanovich	3	6	[10]
(Slovenia) V Erjavec (Hungary) P Udvardy	6	1	[7]
(Italy) L Bronzetti (Japan) M Uchijima	3	0
WC	(Turkey) B Cengiz (Turkey) İ Öz	6	6
3	(China) S Feng (Brazil) L Pigossi	6^{4}	0
(France) E Cascino (Argentina) N Fossa Huergo	7^{7}	6
I Khromacheva; K Zaytseva	6	6
(Brazil) I Martins (Greece) D Papamichail	1	3
(Slovenia) D Jakupović (Slovenia) N Radišić	6	7
(United Kingdom) A Barnett (France) E Lechemia	2	5
(Romania) I Bara (Georgia (country)) E Gorgodze	6	3	[10]
4	(Italy) A Moratelli (China) Q Tang	3	6	[4]
(Japan) M Kobori (Thailand) P Plipuech	7	2	[10]
E Ovcharenko; E Pridankina	5	6	[2]
A Charaeva (Czech Republic) D Šalková	7^{8}	4	[7]
2	(Czech Republic) J Malečková (Czech Republic) M Škoch	6^{6}	6	[10]

Quarterfinals
1	M Kozyreva; I Shymanovich	7	6
WC	(Turkey) B Cengiz (Turkey) İ Öz	5	2
(France) E Cascino (Argentina) N Fossa Huergo	7^{7}	6
I Khromacheva; K Zaytseva	6^{2}	4
(Slovenia) D Jakupović (Slovenia) N Radišić	6	6
(Romania) I Bara (Georgia (country)) E Gorgodze	3	2
(Japan) M Kobori (Thailand) P Plipuech	3	3
2	(Czech Republic) J Malečková (Czech Republic) M Škoch	6	6

Semifinals
1	M Kozyreva; I Shymanovich	4	4
(France) E Cascino (Argentina) N Fossa Huergo	6	6
(Slovenia) D Jakupović (Slovenia) N Radišić	3	6	[9]
2	(Czech Republic) J Malečková (Czech Republic) M Škoch	6	4	[11]

Final
(France) E Cascino (Argentina) N Fossa Huergo	7	7^{8}
2	(Czech Republic) J Malečková (Czech Republic) M Škoch	5	6^{6}
