= 2025 Copa LP Chile – Doubles =

Doubles
- 2025 Copa LP Chile

Final
- Champions: (Argentina) María Lourdes Carlé (Spain) Sara Sorribes Tormo
- Runners-up: (France) Léolia Jeanjean (Ukraine) Valeriya Strakhova
- Score: 6–2, 6–4

Events
Singles	Doubles
- Copa LP Chile

Mayar Sherif and Nina Stojanović were the reigning champions, but did not participate this year.

María Lourdes Carlé and Sara Sorribes Tormo won the title, defeating Léolia Jeanjean and Valeriya Strakhova in the final, 6–2, 6–4.

== Seeds ==
1. (Spain) Alicia Herrero Liñana / (Brazil) Laura Pigossi (semifinals)
2. (United States) Ayana Akli / (India) Riya Bhatia (first round)
3. (France) Léolia Jeanjean / (Ukraine) Valeriya Strakhova (final)
4. (Argentina) María Lourdes Carlé / (Spain) Sara Sorribes Tormo (champions)

== Draw ==
Key

- Q = Qualifier
- WC = Wild card
- LL = Lucky loser
- Alt = Alternate
- ITF = ITF entry
- PR = Protected ranking
- SR = Special ranking
- SE = Special exempt
- JE = Junior exempt
- JR = Junior Accelerator Programme entrant
- CO = College Accelerator Programme entrant
- NG = Next Gen Accelerator Program entrant
- w/o = Walkover
- r = Retired
- d = Defaulted

=== Draw ===
First round
1	(Spain) A Herrero Liñana (Brazil) L Pigossi	6	6
(Czech Republic) L Samson (Bolivia) N Zeballos	4	1
(Serbia) K Jokić (Brazil) R Pereira	w/o
Alt	(Brazil) C Alves (Argentina) J Riera
4	(Argentina) ML Carlé (Spain) S Sorribes Tormo	6	6
(Mexico) M Gómez Pezuela Cano (Netherlands) E Vedder	2	2
(France) C Monnet (Burundi) S Nahimana	4	6	[10]
(United States) A Zamarripa (United States) M Zamarripa	6	3	[6]
(Brazil) G Cé (Italy) M Colmegna	6^{5}	7^{7}	[10]
(Chile) F Labraña (Chile) A Vergara Rivera	7^{7}	6^{2}	[5]
(Argentina) J Ortenzi (Colombia) MP Pérez García	6	3	[6]
3	(France) L Jeanjean (Ukraine) V Strakhova	1	6	[10]
WC	(United States) E Cayetano (United States) J Pareja	5	6	[3]
(Argentina) N Fossa Huergo (United States) V Lepchenko	7	4	[10]
(Chile) J Gerald González (Argentina) L Giovannini	6	6
2	(United States) A Akli (India) R Bhatia	4	4

Quarterfinals
1	(Spain) A Herrero Liñana (Brazil) L Pigossi	6	6
(Serbia) K Jokić (Brazil) R Pereira	2	1
4	(Argentina) ML Carlé (Spain) S Sorribes Tormo	6	6
(France) C Monnet (Burundi) S Nahimana	1	1
(Brazil) G Cé (Italy) M Colmegna	3	3
3	(France) L Jeanjean (Ukraine) V Strakhova	6	6
(Argentina) N Fossa Huergo (United States) V Lepchenko	6^{2}	6	[10]
(Chile) J Gerald González (Argentina) L Giovannini	7^{7}	3	[8]

Semifinals
1	(Spain) A Herrero Liñana (Brazil) L Pigossi	1	4
4	(Argentina) ML Carlé (Spain) S Sorribes Tormo	6	6
3	(France) L Jeanjean (Ukraine) V Strakhova	7^{8}	6
(Argentina) N Fossa Huergo (United States) V Lepchenko	6^{6}	2

Final
4	(Argentina) ML Carlé (Spain) S Sorribes Tormo	6	6
3	(France) L Jeanjean (Ukraine) V Strakhova	2	4
