= 2023 Copa LP Chile =

- Date: 13–19 November 2023
- Edition: 6th
- Category: WTA 125
- Prize money: $115,000
- Surface: Clay / Outdoor
- Location: Colina, Chile
- Venue: Hacienda Chicureo

Champions

Singles
- (Czech Republic) Sára Bejlek

Doubles
- (Germany) Julia Lohoff / (Switzerland) Conny Perrin
- Copa LP Chile

The 2023 Copa LP Chile, also known as LP Open by IND, for sponsorship reasons, was a professional women's tennis tournament played on outdoor clay courts. It was the sixth edition of the tournament which was also part of the 2023 WTA 125 season. It took place at the Hacienda Chicureo Club in Colina, Chile between 13 and 19 November 2023.

== Singles main-draw entrants ==
=== Seeds ===
Country	Player	Rank^{1}	Seed
EGY	Mayar Sherif	49	1
	Diana Shnaider	60	2
ARG	Nadia Podoroska	78	3
ITA	Sara Errani	101	4
FRA	Diane Parry	105	5
HUN	Anna Bondár	114	6
USA	Elizabeth Mandlik	127	7
FRA	Léolia Jeanjean	128	8

- ^{1} Rankings are as of 6 November 2023.

=== Other entrants ===
The following players received wildcards into the singles main draw:

- (Chile) Fernanda Labraña
- (Peru) Lucciana Pérez Alarcón
- (Chile) Daniela Seguel
- (Egypt) Mayar Sherif

The following players received entry from the qualifying draw:

- Amina Anshba
- (Georgia (country)) Ekaterine Gorgodze
- (Burundi) Sada Nahimana
- (Switzerland) Conny Perrin

=== Withdrawals ===
Before the tournament

- (Colombia) Emiliana Arango → replaced by (Argentina) Guillermina Naya
- (Poland) Maja Chwalińska → replaced by (Brazil) Carolina Alves
- Iryna Shymanovich → replaced by (Romania) Miriam Bulgaru
- Maria Timofeeva → replaced by (Turkey) İpek Öz
- (Mexico) Renata Zarazúa → replaced by (Argentina) Solana Sierra

== Doubles entrants ==
=== Seeds ===
Country	Player	Country	Player	Rank^{1}	Seed
	Amina Anshba	HUN	Panna Udvardy	256	1
VEN	Andrea Gámiz	NED	Eva Vedder	271	2
GER	Julia Lohoff	SUI	Conny Perrin	279	3
ITA	Sara Errani	EGY	Mayar Sherif	284	4

- ^{1} Rankings as of 6 November 2023.

=== Other entrants ===
The following pair received a wildcard into the doubles main draw:

- (Chile) Paloma Goldsmith Weinreich / (Chile) Antonia Vergara Rivera

== Champions ==
=== Singles ===
- (Czech Republic) Sára Bejlek def. (France) Diane Parry, 6–2, 6–1

=== Doubles ===
- (Germany) Julia Lohoff / (Switzerland) Conny Perrin def. (Peru) Lucciana Pérez Alarcón / (Chile) Daniela Seguel, 7–6^{(7–4)}, 6–2
