= 2023 Copa LP Chile – Doubles =

Doubles
- 2023 Copa LP Chile

Final
- Champions: (Germany) Julia Lohoff (Switzerland) Conny Perrin
- Runners-up: (Peru) Lucciana Pérez Alarcón (Chile) Daniela Seguel
- Score: 7–6^{(7–4)}, 6–2

Events
Singles	Doubles
- Copa LP Chile

Julia Lohoff and Conny Perrin won the doubles title at the 2023 Copa LP Chile, defeating Lucciana Pérez Alarcón and Daniela Seguel in the final, 7–6^{(7–4)}, 6–2.

Yana Sizikova and Aldila Sutjiadi were the reigning champions, but chose not to participate this year.

== Seeds ==
1. Amina Anshba / (Hungary) Panna Udvardy (quarterfinals)
2. (Venezuela) Andrea Gámiz / (Netherlands) Eva Vedder (quarterfinals)
3. (Germany) Julia Lohoff / (Switzerland) Conny Perrin (champions)
4. (Italy) Sara Errani / (Egypt) Mayar Sherif (first round)

== Draw ==
Key

- Q = Qualifier
- WC = Wild card
- LL = Lucky loser
- Alt = Alternate
- ITF = ITF entry
- PR = Protected ranking
- SR = Special ranking
- SE = Special exempt
- JE = Junior exempt
- JR = Junior Accelerator Programme entrant
- CO = College Accelerator Programme entrant
- NG = Next Gen Accelerator Program entrant
- w/o = Walkover
- r = Retired
- d = Defaulted

=== Draw ===
First round
1	A Anshba (Hungary) P Udvardy	4	6	[13]
(Georgia (country)) E Gorgodze (France) L Jeanjean	6	3	[11]
(United States) M Jones (Ukraine) Y Starodubtseva	6	6
(Brazil) I Gamarra Martins (Brazil) L Pigossi	3	1
3	(Germany) J Lohoff (Switzerland) C Perrin	6	7
(Argentina) M Capurro Taborda (France) C Monnet	4	5
(Argentina) G Naya (Argentina) N Podoroska	1	6	[10]
(Chile) F Labraña (Argentina) J Riera	6	3	[2]
(Argentina) ML Carlé (Greece) D Papamichail	6	6
WC	(Chile) P Goldsmith Weinreich (Chile) A Vergara Rivera	3	2
(France) F Ferro (France) D Parry	2	6	[10]
4	(Italy) S Errani (Egypt) M Sherif	6	2	[6]
(Peru) L Pérez Alarcón (Chile) D Seguel	6	4	[10]
(Brazil) C Alves (Brazil) R Pereira	4	6	[4]
(United States) A Rogers; D Shnaider	4	2
2	(Venezuela) A Gámiz (Netherlands) E Vedder	6	6

Quarterfinals
1	A Anshba (Hungary) P Udvardy	7^{7}	5	[3]
(United States) M Jones (Ukraine) Y Starodubtseva	6^{1}	7	[10]
3	(Germany) J Lohoff (Switzerland) C Perrin	6	6
(Argentina) G Naya (Argentina) N Podoroska	2	3
(Argentina) ML Carlé (Greece) D Papamichail	2	6^{2}
(France) F Ferro (France) D Parry	6	7^{7}
(Peru) L Pérez Alarcón (Chile) D Seguel	6	2	[11]
2	(Venezuela) A Gámiz (Netherlands) E Vedder	2	6	[9]

Semifinals
(United States) M Jones (Ukraine) Y Starodubtseva	2	2
3	(Germany) J Lohoff (Switzerland) C Perrin	6	6
(France) F Ferro (France) D Parry	3	6	[6]
(Peru) L Pérez Alarcón (Chile) D Seguel	6	3	[10]

Final
3	(Germany) J Lohoff (Switzerland) C Perrin	7	6
(Peru) L Pérez Alarcón (Chile) D Seguel	6^{4}	2
