= 2025 Copa LP Chile =

- Date: 17–23 November 2025
- Edition: 8th
- Category: WTA 125
- Prize money: $115,000
- Surface: Clay / Outdoor
- Location: Colina, Chile
- Venue: Hacienda Chicureo

Champions

Singles
- (Ukraine) Oleksandra Oliynykova

Doubles
- (Argentina) María Lourdes Carlé / (Spain) Sara Sorribes Tormo
- Copa LP Chile

The 2025 Copa LP Chile, also known as LP Open by IND, for sponsorship reasons, was a professional women's tennis tournament played on outdoor clay courts. It was the eighth edition of the tournament which was also part of the 2025 WTA 125 season. It took place at the Hacienda Chicureo Club in Colina, Chile between 17 and 23 November 2025.

== Singles main-draw entrants ==
=== Seeds ===
| Country | Player | Rank^{1} | Seed |
|---|---|---|---|
| ~~SUI~~ | ~~Simona Waltert~~ | ~~86~~ | ~~1~~ |
| EGY | Mayar Sherif | 93 | 2 |
| FRA | Léolia Jeanjean | 106 | 3 |
| HUN | Panna Udvardy | 108 | 4 |
| UKR | Oleksandra Oliynykova | 109 | 5 |
| SLO | Veronika Erjavec | 114 | 6 |
| ARG | María Lourdes Carlé | 128 | 7 |
| POL | Maja Chwalińska | 133 | 8 |
| USA | Varvara Lepchenko | 154 | 9 |

- ^{1} Rankings are as of 10 November 2025.

=== Other entrants ===
The following players received wildcards into the singles main draw:

- (Argentina) Luisina Giovannini
- (Chile) Fernanda Labraña
- (Italy) Martina Trevisan
- (Chile) Antonia Vergara Rivera

The following players received entry from the qualifying draw:

- (Brazil) Gabriela Cé
- (Italy) Diletta Cherubini
- (Slovenia) Polona Hercog
- (Spain) Alicia Herrero Liñana

The following player received entry as a lucky loser:

- (Ukraine) Valeriya Strakhova

=== Withdrawals ===
Before the tournament

- (Armenia) Elina Avanesyan → replaced by (Burundi) Sada Nahimana
- (Czech Republic) Sára Bejlek → replaced by (Czech Republic) Laura Samson
- (Georgia (country)) Ekaterine Gorgodze → replaced by (Italy) Jessica Pieri
- (Switzerland) Simona Waltert → replaced by (Ukraine) Valeriya Strakhova (LL)
- (Argentina) Paula Ormaechea → replaced by (Spain) Sara Sorribes Tormo
- (Spain) Leyre Romero Gormaz → replaced by (Brazil) Carolina Alves
- (Mexico) Ana Sofía Sánchez → replaced by (United States) Ayana Akli

== Doubles entrants ==
=== Seeds ===
| Country | Player | Country | Player | Rank^{1} | Seed |
|---|---|---|---|---|---|
| ESP | Alicia Herrero Liñana | BRA | Laura Pigossi | 199 | 1 |
| USA | Ayana Akli | IND | Riya Bhatia | 330 | 2 |
| FRA | Léolia Jeanjean | UKR | Valeriya Strakhova | 336 | 3 |
| ARG | María Lourdes Carlé | ESP | Sara Sorribes Tormo | 372 | 4 |

- Rankings as of 10 November 2025.

=== Other entrants ===
The following pair received a wildcard into the doubles main draw:

- (United States) Eryn Cayetano / (United States) Julieta Pareja

== Champions ==
=== Singles ===
- (Ukraine) Oleksandra Oliynykova def. (France) Léolia Jeanjean 7–5, 6–1

=== Doubles ===
- (Argentina) María Lourdes Carlé / (Spain) Sara Sorribes Tormo def. (France) Léolia Jeanjean / (Ukraine) Valeriya Strakhova 6–2, 6–4
