= Conny Perrin =

Swiss tennis player

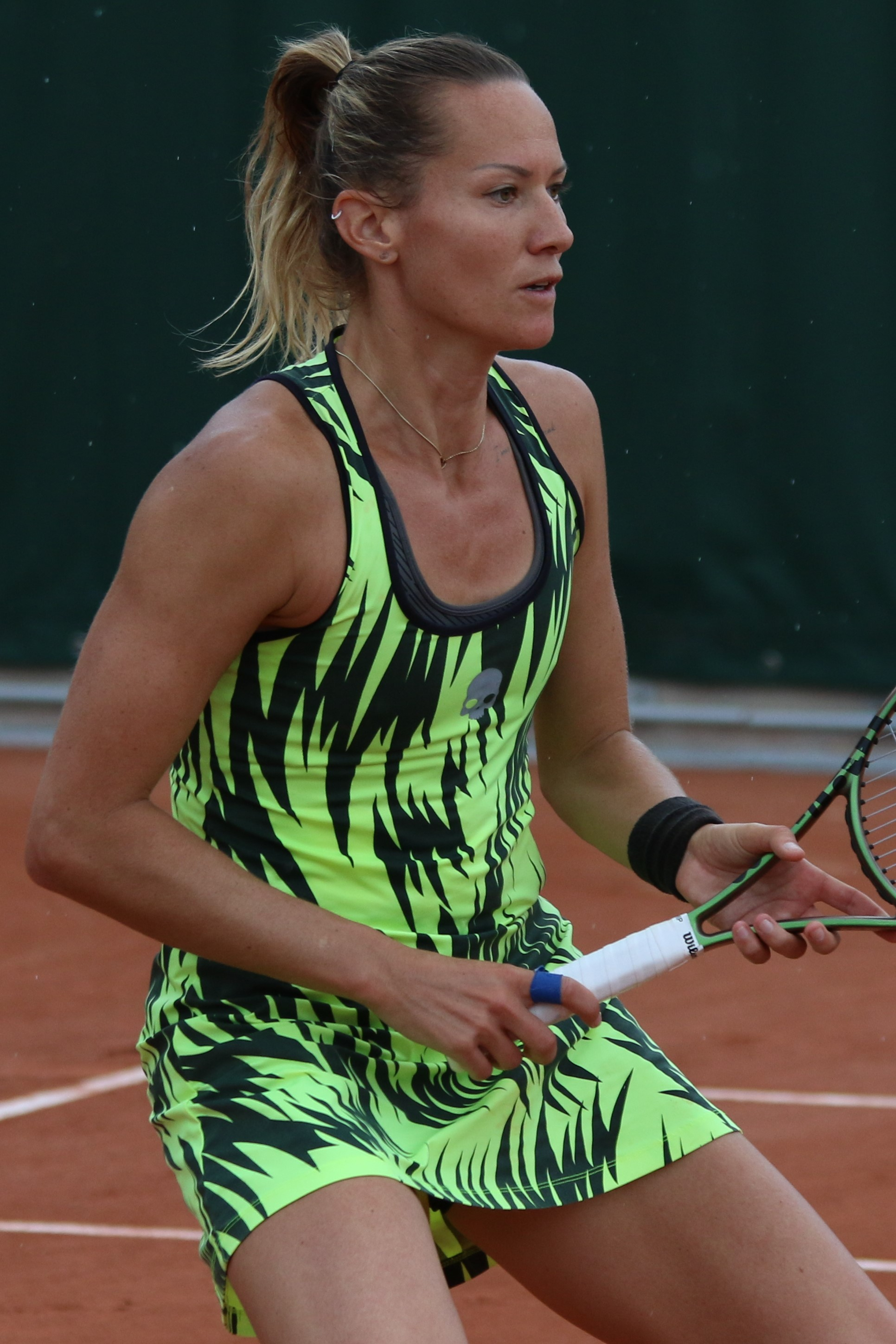
- Perrin at the 2022 French Open
- Country (sports): Switzerland
- Born: 25 December 1990 (age 35) Saint-Imier, Switzerland
- Height: 1.74 m (5 ft 9 in)
- Plays: Right-handed (one-handed backhand)
- Prize money: US$ 679,743

Singles
- Career record: 551–436
- Career titles: 13 ITF
- Highest ranking: No. 134 (22 October 2018)
- Current ranking: No. 1412 (17 November 2025)

Grand Slam singles results
- Australian Open: Q2 (2019)
- French Open: Q3 (2019)
- Wimbledon: Q3 (2018)
- US Open: Q2 (2018)

Doubles
- Career record: 397–314
- Career titles: 1 WTA Challenger, 28 ITF
- Highest ranking: No. 99 (7 October 2024)
- Current ranking: No. 410 (17 November 2025)

Grand Slam doubles results
- Wimbledon: 1R (2016)
- Last updated on: 18 November 2025.

Conny Perrin (born 25 December 1990) is a Swiss tennis player. On 22 October 2018, she reached her career-high singles ranking of world No. 134, and on 7 October 2024, she peaked at No. 99 in the WTA doubles rankings.

Perrin owns one doubles title on the WTA Challenger Tour - the 2023 Copa LP Chile. She has also won 13 singles and 28 doubles titles on the ITF Women's Circuit.

== Performance timelines ==
Key
W	F	SF	QF	#R	RR	Q#	DNQ	A	NH

(W) winner; (F) finalist; (SF) semifinalist; (QF) quarterfinalist; (#R) rounds 4, 3, 2, 1; (RR) round-robin stage; (Q#) qualification round; (DNQ) did not qualify; (A) absent; (NH) not held; (SR) strike rate (events won / competed); (W–L) win–loss record.
To avoid confusion and double counting, these charts are updated at the conclusion of a tournament or when the player's participation has ended.

=== Singles ===
Tournament	2017	2018	2019	2020	2021	2022	W–L
Grand Slam tournaments
Australian Open	Q1	Q1	Q2	Q1	A	Q1	0–0
French Open	Q1	Q1	Q3	A	A	Q2	0–0
Wimbledon	Q1	Q3	Q1	NH	A	Q2	0–0
US Open	Q1	Q2	Q1	A	A		0–0
Win–loss	0–0	0–0	0–0	0–0	0–0	0–0	0–0
WTA 1000
Indian Wells Open	A	A	Q1	NH	A	A	0–0

=== Doubles ===
Tournament	2016	2017	...	2022	W–L
Australian Open	A	A		A	0–0
French Open	A	A		A	0–0
Wimbledon	1R	Q1		A	0–1
US Open	A	A			0–0
Win–loss	0–1	0–0		0–0	0–1

== WTA Tour finals ==
=== Doubles: 1 (runner–up) ===
Legend Grand Slam WTA 1000 WTA 500 WTA 250 (0–1)	Finals by surface Hard (0–0) Clay (0–1) Grass (0–0)	Finals by setting Outdoor (0–1) Indoor (0–0)

Result	Date	Tournament	Tier	Surface	Partner	Opponents	Score
Loss	Feb 2016	Rio Open, Brazil	International (Note: The WTA International tournaments were reclassified as WTA 250 tournaments in 2021.)	Clay	(United Kingdom) Tara Moore	(Paraguay) Verónica Cepede Royg (Argentina) María Irigoyen	1–6, 6–7^{(5)}

== WTA Challenger finals ==
=== Doubles: 2 (1 title, 1 runner-up) ===
Result	W–L	Date	Tournament	Surface	Partner	Opponents	Score
Win	1–0	Nov 2023	Copa Santiago, Chile	Clay	(Germany) Julia Lohoff	(Peru) Lucciana Pérez Alarcón (Chile) Daniela Seguel	7–6^{(4)}, 6–2
Loss	1–1	Nov 2023	Brasil Tennis Cup, Brazil	Clay	(Germany) Julia Lohoff	(Italy) Sara Errani (France) Léolia Jeanjean	5–7, 6–3, [7–10]

== ITF Circuit finals ==
=== Singles: 28 (13 titles, 15 runner-ups) ===
Legend W100 tournaments (0–1) W25 tournaments (3–10) W10/15 tournaments (10–4)	Finals by surface Hard (5–7) Clay (8–7) Grass (0–1)

Result	W–L	Date	Tournament	Tier	Surface	Opponent	Score
Win	1–0	Aug 2008	ITF Bucharest, Romania	W10	Clay	(Romania) Diana Enache	6–3, 6–2
Win	2–0	Dec 2008	ITF Vinaròs, Spain	W10	Clay	(Bulgaria) Elitsa Kostova	6–4, 6–2
Loss	2–1	Apr 2010	ITF Šibenik, Croatia	W10	Clay	(Romania) Mădălina Gojnea	2–6, 1–6
Win	3–1	Aug 2010	ITF Osijek, Croatia	W10	Clay	(Hungary) Réka Luca Jani	7–6^{(10)}, 4–6, 6–1
Win	4–1	Nov 2010	ITF Barueri, Brazil	W10	Hard	(Romania) Alexandra Cadanțu	5–0 ret.
Loss	4–2	Feb 2011	ITF Mallorca, Spain	W10	Clay	(Spain) Lara Arruabarrena	1–6, 2–6
Win	5–2	Apr 2012	ITF Algiers, Algeria	W10	Clay	(Austria) Yvonne Neuwirth	6–3, 6–0
Loss	5–3	Oct 2012	Lagos Open, Nigeria	W25	Hard	(Romania) Cristina Dinu	3–6, 3–6
Loss	5–4	Dec 2013	ITF Antalya, Turkey	W10	Clay	(Romania) Patricia Maria Țig	2–6, 5–7
Win	6–4	Apr 2014	ITF Dakar, Senegal	W15	Hard	(South Africa) Chanel Simmonds	6–0, 7–5
Win	7–4	May 2014	ITF Båstad, Sweden	W10	Clay	(Greece) Maria Sakkari	7–5, 6–1
Loss	7–5	Aug 2014	ITF Braunschweig, Germany	W15	Clay	(Germany) Antonia Lottner	3–6, 3–6
Win	8–5	Aug 2014	ITF Bagnatica, Italy	W15	Clay	(Italy) Anastasia Grymalska	6–3, 7–5
Win	9–5	Sep 2014	ITF Algiers, Algeria	W15	Clay	(France) Sherazad Reix	6–1, 6–1
Win	10–5	Dec 2015	Lagos Open, Nigeria	W25	Hard	(Slovenia) Tadeja Majerič	3–6, 6–4, 7–6^{(6)}
Loss	10–6	Oct 2016	Lagos Open, Nigeria	W25	Hard	(Slovenia) Tadeja Majerič	6–3, 1–6, 1–6
Win	11–6	Oct 2016	Lagos Open, Nigeria	W25	Hard	(Slovenia) Tadeja Majerič	6–3, 6–3
Loss	11–7	Jul 2017	ITF Horb, Germany	W25	Clay	(Switzerland) Patty Schnyder	3–6, 1–6
Loss	11–8	Oct 2017	Lagos Open, Nigeria	W25	Hard	(Israel) Deniz Khazaniuk	6–4, 1–6, 3–6
Win	12–8	Oct 2017	Lagos Open, Nigeria	W25	Hard	(Israel) Deniz Khazaniuk	7–6^{(11)}, 6–3
Loss	12–9	Feb 2018	GB Pro-Series Loughborough, United Kingdom	W25	Hard (i)	(Czech Republic) Tereza Smitková	3–6, 2–6
Loss	12–10	Jun 2018	Surbiton Trophy, UK	W100	Grass	(United States) Alison Riske	2–6, 4–6
Loss	12–11	Oct 2018	Lagos Open, Nigeria	W25	Hard	(India) Pranjala Yadlapalli	6–2, 5–7, 0–6
Loss	12–12	Oct 2018	Lagos Open, Nigeria	W25	Hard	(India) Pranjala Yadlapalli	1–6, 6–7^{(2)}
Loss	12–13	Oct 2019	ITF Cúcuta, Colombia	W25	Clay	(United States) Allie Kiick	2–6, 2–6
Win	13–13	Dec 2020	ITF Madrid, Spain	W15	Clay	(Spain) Jéssica Bouzas Maneiro	6–4, 7–6^{(8)}
Loss	13–14	Jun 2021	ITF Santo Domingo, Dominican Republic	W25	Hard	(Argentina) María Carlé	4–6, 0–6
Loss	13–15	Aug 2023	Verbier Open, Switzerland	W25	Clay	(Latvia) Diāna Marcinkēviča	3–6, 4–6

=== Doubles: 68 (28 titles, 40 runner-ups) ===
Legend W80 tournaments (1–0) W60/75 tournaments (4–12) W40 tournaments (0–1) W25 tournaments (16–18) W10/15 tournaments (7–9)	Finals by surface Hard (11–17) Clay (16–21) Carpet (1–2)

Result	W–L	Date	Tournament	Tier	Surface	Partner	Opponents	Score
Win	1–0	Oct 2007	ITF Porto, Portugal	W10	Clay	(Switzerland) Nicole Riner	(France) Claire de Gubernatis (Russia) Anna Savitskaya	5–7, 6–3, [10–3]
Loss	1–1	Sep 2008	ITF Innsbruck, Austria	W10	Clay	(Switzerland) Nicole Riner	(Ukraine) Irina Buryachok (Georgia (country)) Oksana Kalashnikova	6–3, 3–6, [7–10]
Loss	1–2	Nov 2008	ITF La Vall d'Uixó, Spain	W10	Clay	(Switzerland) Stefania Boffa	(Spain) Lucía Sainz (United States) Ashley Weinhold	2–6, 3–6
Win	2–2	Oct 2009	ITF Dubrovnik, Croatia	W10	Clay	(Hungary) Réka Luca Jani	(Croatia) Matea Čutura (Croatia) Dorotea Kraljević	6–2, 6–3
Loss	2–3	Feb 2011	ITF Mallorca, Spain	W10	Clay	(Hungary) Réka Luca Jani	(Netherlands) Daniëlle Harmsen (Germany) Scarlett Werner	4–6, 3–6
Loss	2–4	Apr 2011	ITF Pomezia, Italy	W10	Clay	(Russia) Marina Shamayko	(Romania) Diana Enache (Italy) Karin Knapp	6–7^{(3)}, 2–6
Win	3–4	Sep 2011	ITF Mont-de-Marsan, France	W25	Clay	(Germany) Karolina Nowak	(France) Céline Cattaneo (Russia) Natalia Orlova	2–6, 6–2, [10–7]
Loss	3–5	Apr 2012	Chiasso Open, Switzerland	W25	Clay	(Slovenia) Maša Zec Peškirič	(Russia) Daria Gavrilova (Russia) Irina Khromacheva	0–6, 6–7^{(1)}
Win	4–5	Jul 2012	ITF Les Contamines, France	W25	Hard	(Slovenia) Maša Zec Peškirič	(Switzerland) Timea Bacsinszky (France) Estelle Guisard	2–6, 6–4, [10–5]
Win	5–5	Oct 2012	Lagos Open, Nigeria	W25	Hard	(South Africa) Chanel Simmonds	(Russia) Nina Bratchikova (Russia) Margarita Lazareva	6–1, 6–1
Win	6–5	Oct 2012	Lagos Open, Nigeria	W25	Hard	(South Africa) Chanel Simmonds	(China) Lu Jiajing (China) Lu Jiaxiang	6–2, 3–6, [10–7]
Win	7–5	Nov 2012	ITF Benicarló, Spain	W25	Clay	(Slovenia) Maša Zec Peškirič	(Venezuela) Andrea Gámiz (Spain) Beatriz García Vidagany	6–4, 6–3
Win	8–5	Dec 2012	ITF Pune, India	W25	Hard	(Slovenia) Tadeja Majerič	(China) Lu Jiajing (China) Lu Jiaxiang	3–6, 7–5, [10–6]
Loss	8–6	Oct 2013	Lagos Open, Nigeria	W25	Hard	(South Africa) Chanel Simmonds	(Oman) Fatma Al-Nabhani (Italy) Gioia Barbieri	6–1, 4–6, [8–10]
Win	9–6	Dec 2013	ITF Antalya, Turkey	W10	Clay	(Romania) Irina Bara	(Romania) Gabriela Talabă (Romania) Patricia Maria Țig	6–3, 6–1
Loss	9–7	Apr 2014	ITF Dakar, Senegal	W15	Hard	(Russia) Ekaterina Yashina	(South Africa) Chanel Simmonds (United Kingdom) Emily Webley-Smith	4–6, 5–7
Loss	9–8	May 2014	ITF Båstad, Sweden	W10	Clay	(Bosnia and Herzegovina) Dea Herdželaš	(Germany) Kim Grajdek (Greece) Maria Sakkari	5–7, 4–6
Win	10–8	Aug 2014	ITF Leipzig, Germany	W15	Clay	(Russia) Olga Doroshina	(Ukraine) Diana Bogoliy (Russia) Polina Leykina	7–5, 6–4
Win	11–8	Aug 2014	ITF Braunschweig, Germany	W15	Clay	(South Africa) Chanel Simmonds	(Russia) Polina Leykina (Bulgaria) Isabella Shinikova	6–3, 6–0
Win	12–8	Aug 2014	ITF Bagnatica, Italy	W15	Clay	(Italy) Anastasia Grymalska	(France) Manon Arcangioli (Slovakia) Zuzana Zlochová	7–5, 3–6, [10–8]
Win	13–8	Sep 2014	ITF Algiers, Algeria	W15	Clay	(Austria) Pia König	(Serbia) Natalija Kostić (Russia) Margarita Lazareva	6–3, 6–1
Loss	13–9	Feb 2015	GB Pro-Series Glasgow, UK	W25	Hard (i)	(United Kingdom) Tara Moore	(Italy) Corinna Dentoni (Italy) Claudia Giovine	6–0, 1–6, [7–10]
Loss	13–10	Apr 2015	ITF Dakar, Senegal	W15	Hard	(Russia) Ekaterina Yashina	(Russia) Aminat Kushkhova (Russia) Margarita Lazareva	3–6, 2–6
Loss	13–11	Jun 2015	ITF Ystad, Sweden	W25	Clay	(South Africa) Chanel Simmonds	(Switzerland) Xenia Knoll (Sweden) Cornelia Lister	5–7, 6–7^{(5)}
Loss	13–12	Jun 2015	ITF Zeeland, Netherlands	W15	Clay	(Ukraine) Alyona Sotnikova	(Netherlands) Lesley Kerkhove (Netherlands) Quirine Lemoine	2–6, 6–3, [3–10]
Loss	13–13	Jul 2015	ITF Rome, Italy	W25	Clay	(United Kingdom) Tara Moore	(Italy) Claudia Giovine (Greece) Despina Papamichail	4–6, 6–7^{(2)}
Loss	13–14	Aug 2015	ITF Leipzig, Germany	W15	Clay	(Austria) Pia König	(Australia) Priscilla Hon (Switzerland) Jil Teichmann	1–6, 4–6
Win	14–14	Sep 2015	ITF Monterrey, Mexico	W25	Hard	(Slovenia) Tadeja Majerič	(Chile) Alexa Guarachi (Chinese Taipei) Hsu Chieh-yu	7–5, 6–3
Loss	14–15	Dec 2015	Lagos Open, Nigeria	W25	Hard	(Slovenia) Tadeja Majerič	(Bulgaria) Julia Terziyska (India) Prarthana Thombare	6–4, 3–6, [8–10]
Loss	14–16	Feb 2016	ITF São Paulo, Brazil	W25	Clay	(United Kingdom) Tara Moore	(Argentina) Catalina Pella (Chile) Daniela Seguel	3–6, 1–6
Win	15–16	Jun 2016	ITF Périgueux, France	W25	Clay	(Slovakia) Chantal Škamlová	(Argentina) Julieta Estable (Argentina) Guadalupe Pérez Rojas	6–3, 3–6, [10–7]
Loss	15–17	Aug 2016	ITF Bagnatica, Italy	W25	Clay	(Russia) Yana Sizikova	(Italy) Alice Matteucci (Italy) Camilla Rosatello	4–6, 7–5, [5–10]
Win	16–17	Sep 2016	ITF Hódmezővásárhely, Hungary	W25	Clay	(Slovakia) Chantal Škamlová	(Romania) Irina Bara (Romania) Elena Bogdan	6–4, 6–2
Loss	16–18	Feb 2017	AK Ladies Open, Germany	W25	Carpet (i)	(United Kingdom) Tara Moore	(Romania) Alexandra Cadanțu (Sweden) Cornelia Lister	2–6, 6–3, [9–11]
Loss	16–19	Mar 2017	ITF Santa Margherita di Pula, Italy	W25	Clay	(United Kingdom) Tara Moore	(Russia) Olesya Pervushina (Ukraine) Dayana Yastremska	4–6, 4–6
Loss	16–20	Jun 2017	Grado Tennis Cup, Italy	W25	Clay	(Croatia) Tereza Mrdeža	(Israel) Julia Glushko (Australia) Priscilla Hon	5–7, 2–6
Win	17–20	Sep 2017	Albuquerque Championships, US	W80	Hard	(United Kingdom) Tara Moore	(Switzerland) Viktorija Golubic (Switzerland) Amra Sadiković	6–3, 6–3
Loss	17–21	Oct 2017	Lagos Open, Nigeria	W25	Hard	(Ukraine) Valeriya Strakhova	(Turkey) Ayla Aksu (Montenegro) Ana Veselinović	4–6, 2–6
Win	18–21	Oct 2017	Lagos Open, Nigeria	W25	Hard	(Ukraine) Valeriya Strakhova	(Slovenia) Tadeja Majerič (United Kingdom) Tiffany William	6–1, 6–2
Loss	18–22	Feb 2018	GB Pro-Series Loughborough, UK	W25	Hard (i)	(United Kingdom) Tara Moore	(Netherlands) Michaëlla Krajicek (Netherlands) Bibiane Schoofs	7–6^{(5)}, 1–6, [6–10]
Win	19–22	Mar 2018	ITF São Paulo, Brazil	W25	Clay	(United Kingdom) Tara Moore	(Chinese Taipei) Hsu Chieh-yu (Mexico) Marcela Zacarías	6–4, 3–6, [13–11]
Win	20–22	May 2018	ITF Rome, Italy	W25	Clay	(South Africa) Chanel Simmonds	(Chinese Taipei) Chen Pei-hsuan (Chinese Taipei) Wu Fang-hsien	6–7^{(0)}, 6–2, [10–7]
Loss	20–23	Oct 2018	ITF Florence, US	W25	Hard	(United Kingdom) Tara Moore	(Kazakhstan) Anna Danilina (Norway) Ulrikke Eikeri	6–7^{(7)}, 6–2, [8–10]
Win	21–23	Oct 2018	Challenger de Saguenay, Canada	W60	Hard (i)	(United Kingdom) Tara Moore	(Canada) Sharon Fichman (United States) Maria Sanchez	6–0, 5–7, [10–7]
Loss	21–24	Sep 2019	Montreux Ladies Open, Switzerland	W60	Clay	(Switzerland) Ylena In-Albon	(Switzerland) Xenia Knoll (Luxembourg) Mandy Minella	3–6, 4–6
Loss	21–25	Nov 2019	Asunción Open, Paraguay	W60	Clay	(Kazakhstan) Anna Danilina	(Venezuela) Andrea Gámiz (Spain) Georgina García Pérez	4–6, 6–3, [3–10]
Loss	21–26	Nov 2019	Copa Santiago, Chile	W60	Clay	(Kazakhstan) Anna Danilina	(United States) Hayley Carter (Brazil) Luisa Stefani	7–5, 3–6, [6–10]
Loss	21–27	Mar 2020	Las Vegas Open, US	W25	Hard	(Serbia) Jovana Jović	(United States) Lorraine Guillermo (United States) Maegan Manasse	6–0, 2–6, [4–10]
Loss	21–28	Feb 2021	ITF Orlando, US	W25	Hard	(Colombia) Camila Osorio	(United States) Emina Bektas (United Kingdom) Tara Moore	5–7, 6–2, [5–10]
Loss	21–29	Feb 2021	ITF Boca Raton, US	W25	Hard	(Colombia) Camila Osorio	(United States) Usue Maitane Arconada (United States) Caroline Dolehide	3–6, 4–6
Loss	21–30	Apr 2021	Oeiras Ladies Open, Portugal	W60	Clay	(Russia) Marina Melnikova	(Belarus) Lidziya Marozava (Romania) Andreea Mitu	6–3, 4–6, [3–10]
Win	22–30	May 2021	ITF Salinas, Ecuador	W25	Hard	(United States) Rasheeda McAdoo	(Mexico) Victoria Rodriguez (Mexico) Ana Sofia Sanchez	6–4, 7–6^{(5)}
Loss	22–31	Aug 2021	ITF Vigo, Spain	W25	Hard	(Brazil) Laura Pigossi	(United Kingdom) Alicia Barnett (Australia) Olivia Gadecki	3–6, 2–6
Loss	22–32	Sep 2021	Montreux Ladies Open, Switzerland	W60	Clay	(United Kingdom) Eden Silva	(France) Estelle Cascino (Italy) Camilla Rosatello	6–7^{(4)}, 4–6
Win	23–32	Mar 2022	Open Medellín, Colombia	W25	Clay	(Chile) Daniela Seguel	(Argentina) María Carlé (Brazil) Laura Pigossi	6–2, 5–7, [10–8]
Loss	23–33	May 2022	Koper Open, Slovenia	W60	Clay	(Switzerland) Joanne Züger	(Switzerland) Xenia Knoll (United Kingdom) Samantha Murray Sharan	3–6, 2–6
Loss	23–34	Oct 2022	Trnava Indoor, Slovakia	W60	Hard (i)	(Latvia) Diāna Marcinkēviča	(Georgia (country)) Mariam Bolkvadze (United Kingdom) Maia Lumsden	2–6, 3–6
Win	24–34	Nov 2022	ITF Saint-Étienne, France	W25	Hard (i)	(United Kingdom) Eden Silva	Ekaterina Kazionova; Ekaterina Makarova	6–4, 4–6, [10–6]
Loss	24–35	Jan 2023	Open Andrézieux-Bouthéon, France	W60	Hard (i)	Iryna Shymanovich	Oksana Selekhmeteva; Sofya Lansere	3–6, 0–6
Win	25–35	Apr 2023	Bellinzona Ladies Open, Switzerland	W60	Clay	(Czech Republic) Anna Sisková	(United Kingdom) Freya Christie (United Kingdom) Ali Collins	3–6, 7–6^{(9)}, [10–5]
Win	26–35	May 2023	ITF Tossa de Mar, Spain	W25H	Carpet	(Spain) Georgina García Pérez	(Greece) Martha Matoula (Romania) Arina Vasilescu	4–6, 6–3, [10–7]
Loss	26–36	Jun 2023	ITF Montemor-o-Novo, Portugal	W40	Hard	(Switzerland) Naima Karamoko	(Hong Kong) Eudice Chong (Netherlands) Arianne Hartono	2–6, 0–6
Loss	26–37	Jun 2023	Open de Biarritz, France	W60	Clay	(Czech Republic) Anna Sisková	(Poland) Weronika Falkowska (Poland) Katarzyna Kawa	6–7^{(2)}, 5–7
Win	27–37	Sep 2023	Collonge-Bellerive Open, Switzerland	W60	Clay	(Czech Republic) Anna Sisková	(France) Estelle Cascino (Latvia) Diāna Marcinkēviča	7–6^{(4)}, 6–1
Loss	27–38	Feb 2024	AK Ladies Open, Germany	W75	Carpet (i)	(Germany) Julia Lohoff	(Poland) Maja Chwalińska (Czech Republic) Jesika Malečková	4–6, 5–7
Win	28–38	Apr 2024	Bellinzona Ladies Open, Switzerland	W75	Clay	(Czech Republic) Jesika Malečková	(United States) Carmen Corley (United States) Ivana Corley	6–7^{(4)}, 7–6^{(7)}, [10–7]
Loss	28–39	Oct 2024	Internationaux de Poitiers, France	W75	Hard (i)	(Poland) Martyna Kubka	(Germany) Anna-Lena Friedsam (Switzerland) Céline Naef	4–6, 1–6
Loss	28–40	Jan 2025	Open Andrézieux-Bouthéon, France	W75	Hard (i)	(Netherlands) Lian Tran	(Turkey) Ayla Aksu; Yuliya Hatouka	7–5, 4–6, [12–14]
