= Lucciana Pérez =

Peruvian tennis player (born 2005)

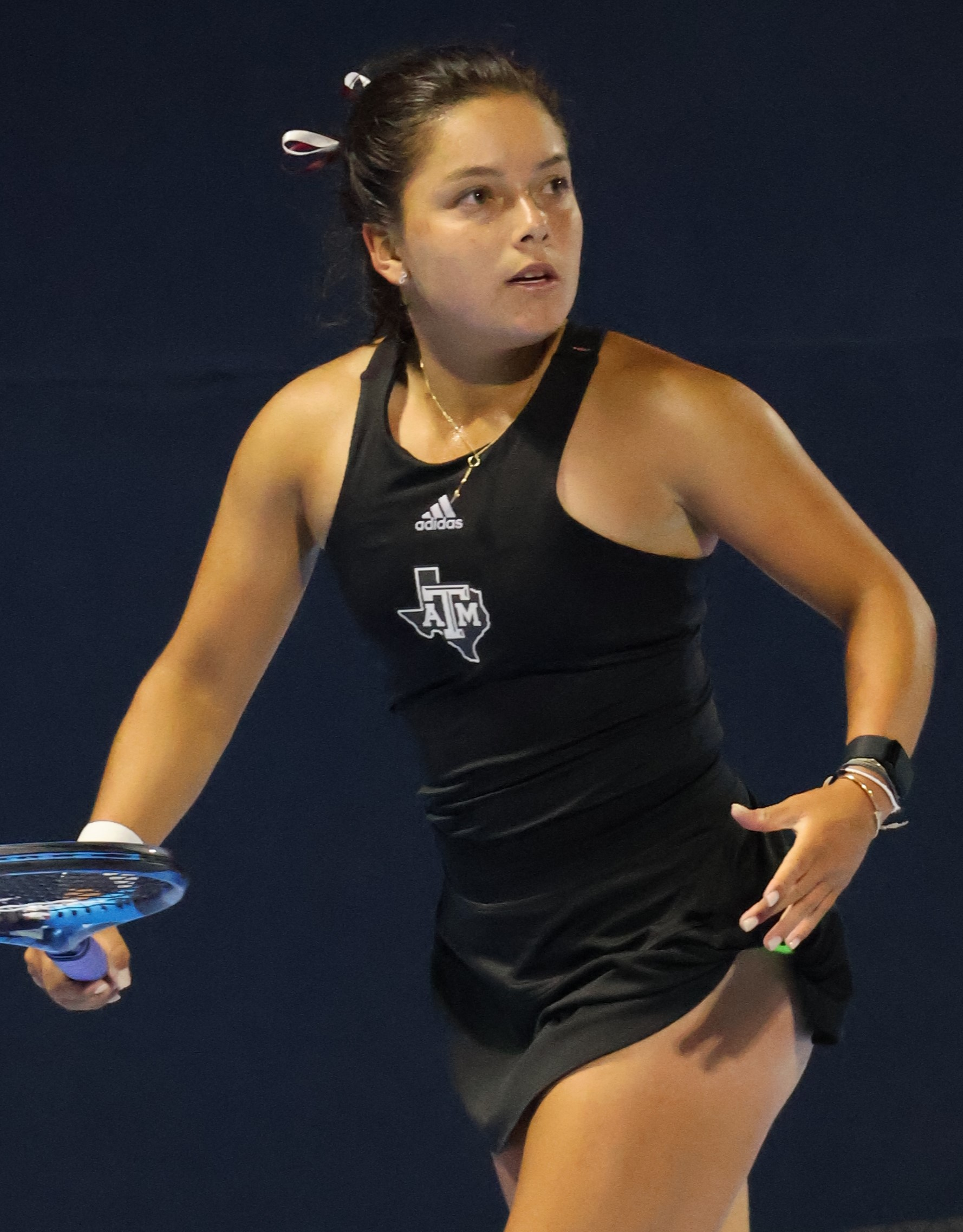
- Pérez with Texas A&M in 2024
- Full name: Lucciana Pérez Alarcón
- Country (sports): Peru
- Born: 8 May 2005 (age 21)
- Plays: Right (two-handed backhand)
- College: Texas A&M
- Prize money: $66,412

Singles
- Career record: 81–35
- Career titles: 5 ITF
- Highest ranking: No. 327 (29 June 2026)
- Current ranking: No. 341 (3 August 2026)

Doubles
- Career record: 56–24
- Career titles: 6 ITF
- Highest ranking: No. 288 (11 November 2024)
- Current ranking: No. 597 (3 August 2026)

Team competitions
- Fed Cup: 9–2
- Last updated on: 6 August 2026.

Lucciana Pérez Alarcón (born 8 May 2005) is a Peruvian tennis player.

She played college tennis for the Texas A&M Aggies and was named Southeastern Conference (SEC) Freshman of the Year in 2024. She helped the Aggies win their first NCAA Women's Championship that season, and second in 2026.

== Career ==
=== Juniors ===
Competing at the 2022 US Open, she lost in the first round to top seed Sofia Costoulas. She reached the final of the girls' singles draw at the 2023 French Open where she lost to Alina Korneeva, in straight sets.

=== Professional ===
In 2023, Pérez received a Grand Slam Player Development Grant from the ITF.

She represented Peru in the Billie Jean King Cup in April 2023, playing singles and doubles against Chile, Colombia, Bolivia, Argentina and Guatemala in the 2023 Billie Jean King Cup Americas Zone. On her debut singles match she defeated Fernanda Labrana of Chile in straight sets. She won all five of her singles matches and has a 4–2 win/loss record in doubles.

Pérez received a wildcard entry into the WTA 125 2024 Cali Open but lost in the first round to second seed and eventual champion, Irina-Camelia Begu ,in straight sets.

== WTA 125 finals ==
=== Doubles: 1 (runner-up) ===
Result	W–L	Date	Tournament	Surface	Partner	Opponents	Score
Loss	0–1	Nov 2023	Copa Colina, Chile	Clay	(Chile) Daniela Seguel	(Germany) Julia Lohoff (Switzerland) Conny Perrin	6–7^{(4)}, 2–6

== ITF Circuit finals ==
=== Singles: 12 (5 titles, 7 runner-ups) ===
Legend W75 tournaments (0–1) W35 tournaments (3–3) W15 tournaments (2–3)	Finals by surface Clay (5–6) Hard (0–1)

Result	W–L	Date	Tournament	Tier	Surface	Opponent	Score
Loss	0–1	Jun 2024	ITF Maringá, Brazil	W15	Clay	(Argentina) Jazmín Ortenzi	4–6, 3–6
Win	1–1	Jul 2024	ITF Luján, Argentina	W15	Clay	(Argentina) Luisina Giovannini	7–5 ret.
Loss	1–2	Jul 2024	ITF Luján, Argentina	W15	Clay	(Argentina) Luisina Giovannini	6–1, 2–6, 4–6
Loss	1–3	Jul 2024	ITF Pilar, Argentina	W35	Clay	(Argentina) Solana Sierra	6–2, 2–6, 1–6
Win	2–3	Aug 2024	ITF Chacabuco, Argentina	W35	Clay	(France) Alice Tubello	6–2, 6–4
Loss	2–4	Nov 2024	ITF Neuquén, Argentina	W15	Clay	(Argentina) Luisina Giovannini	0–6, 1–6
Win	3–4	Jul 2025	ITF Rio Claro, Brazil	W35	Clay	(Italy) Miriana Tona	6–1, 6–2
Win	4–4	Jul 2025	ITF São Paulo, Brazil	W35	Clay	(Argentina) Maria Florencia Urrutia	7–6^{(7)}, 6–3
Loss	4–5	Sep 2025	ITF San Rafael, United States	W35	Hard	(United States) Madison Brengle	6–7, 0–6
Win	5–5	Dec 2025	ITF Lima, Peru	W15	Clay	(Germany) Marie Vogt	6–1, 3–0 ret.
Loss	5–6	Jun 2026	ITF San Gregorio, Italy	W35	Clay	(Argentina) Nadia Podoroska	6–2, 4–6, 6–7^{(5)}
Loss	5–7	July 2026	Vacaria Open, Brazil	W75	Clay (i)	(Argentina) Julia Riera	5–7, 0–6

=== Doubles: 11 (6 titles, 5 runner-ups) ===
Legend W50 tournaments (1–0) W35 tournaments (2–1) W15 tournaments (3–4)	Finals by surface Clay (6–5)

Result	W–L	Date	Tournament	Tier	Surface	Partner	Opponents	Score
Win	1–0	Nov 2022	ITF Lima, Peru	W15	Clay	(Peru) Anastasia Iamachkine	(Peru) Romina Ccuno (Colombia) María Camila Torres	6–2, 6–4
Loss	1–1	Sep 2023	ITF Hilton Head, United States	W15	Clay	(Japan) Wakana Sonobe	(Chinese Taipei) Hsu Chieh-yu (United States) Mia Yamakita	2–6, 5–7
Loss	1–2	May 2024	ITF Rio Claro, Brazil	W15	Clay	(Argentina) Jazmín Ortenzi	(Brazil) Rebeca Pereira (Ecuador) Camila Romero	3–6, 1–6
Win	2–2	Jun 2024	ITF Maringá, Brazil	W15	Clay	(Argentina) Jazmín Ortenzi	(Brazil) Camilla Bossi (Brazil) Letícia Garcia Vidal	6–2, 6–1
Win	3–2	Jul 2024	ITF Luján, Argentina	W15	Clay	(Argentina) Jazmín Ortenzi	(Peru) Romina Ccuno (Argentina) María Florencia Urrutia	6–4, 7–5
Loss	3–3	Jul 2024	ITF Luján, Argentina	W15	Clay	(Peru) Romina Ccuno	(Argentina) Luisina Giovannini (Mexico) Marian Gómez Pezuela	0–6, 2–6
Loss	3–4	Aug 2024	ITF Chacabuco, Argentina	W35	Clay	(Argentina) Jazmin Ortenzi	(Argentina) Luisina Giovannini (Mexico) Marian Gómez Pezuela	walkover
Win	4–4	Aug 2024	ITF Arequipa, Peru	W50	Clay	(Argentina) Jazmin Ortenzi	(France) Tiantsoa Rakotomanga Rajaonah (Netherlands) Lian Tran	5–7, 6–3, [10–1]
Loss	4–5	Nov 2024	ITF Neuquén, Argentina	W15	Clay	(Chile) Fernanda Labraña	(Argentina) Luisina Giovannini (Mexico) Marian Gómez Pezuela	3–6, 4–6
Win	5–5	Jul 2025	ITF São Paulo, Brazil	W35	Clay	(Mexico) Marian Gómez Pezuela	(China) Dang Yiming (China) You Xiaodi	walkover
Win	6–5	Jun 2026	ITF San Gregorio, Italy	W35	Clay	(Italy) Miriana Tona	(Italy) Eleonora Alvisi (Italy) Francesca Gandolfi	7–6^{(2)}, 4–6, [10–7]

=== Junior Grand Slam tournament finals ===
==== Singles: 1 (runner-up) ====
Outcome	Year	Championship	Surface	Opponent	Score
Loss	2023	French Open	Clay	Alina Korneeva	6–7^{(4)}, 3–6

=== Finales ITF Junior ===
==== Singles ====
Resultado	Fecha	Torneo	Superficie	Rival	Marcador
Victoria	12-12-2020	(Peru) J5 Lima	Arcilla	(Chile) Martina Pavissich	6–1, 6–0
Victoria	19-12-2020	(Peru) J5 Lima	Arcilla	(United States) Patricia Grigoras	6–2, 7–6
Victoria	01-05-2021	(Peru) J4 Lima	Arcilla	(United States) Patricia Grigoras	6–2, 6–1
Victoria	08-05-2021	(Peru) J4 Lima	Arcilla	(Argentina) Chiara Di Genova	6–1, 6–0
Derrota	31-07-2021	(Colombia) J3 Bogotá	Arcilla	(United States) Kaitlin Quevedo	4–6, 1–6
Victoria	09-04-2022	(Peru) JB1 Lima	Arcilla	(Argentina) Luciana Moyano	7–5, 4–6, 6–4
Victoria	29-10-2022	(Argentina) J2 Neuquén	Arcilla	(Argentina) Luciana Moyano	6–2, 3–6, 6–1
Victoria	05-11-2022	(Chile) J2 Santiago	Arcilla	(United States) Mia Slama	6–2, 6–2
Victoria	11-02-2023	(Colombia) J300 Barranquilla	Dura	(United States) Iva Jovic	3–6, 6–2, 7–5
Victoria	18-02-2023	(Peru) J300 Lima	Arcilla	(United States) Kaitlin Quevedo	7–5, 6–4
Derrota	05-03-2023	(Brazil) J300 Porto Alegre	Arcilla	(Japan) Sara Saito	6–7, 5–7
Victoria	01-04-2023	(Bolivia) J300 Santa Cruz	Arcilla	(Argentina) Luciana Moyano	6–3, 6–4

==== Dobles ====
Resultado	Fecha	Torneo	Superficie	Pareja	Rivales	Marcador
Victoria	12-05-2019	(Peru) J5 Lima	Arcilla	(Peru) Micaela Ode	(Colombia) María Parra (Colombia) Isabella Rivera	7–5, 6–3
Victoria	12-12-2020	(Peru) J5 Lima	Arcilla	(Peru) Daianne Hayashida	(United States) Emily Callahan (United States) Rose Seccia	6–1, 6–3
Victoria	19-12-2020	(Peru) J5 Lima	Arcilla	(Peru) Daianne Hayashida	(United States) Emily Callahan (United States) Aida Eissa	6–1, 6–1
Victoria	19-12-2020	(Peru) J4 Lima	Arcilla	(Peru) Samantha Núñez	(Bolivia) Ana Holweg (Bolivia) Mariana Zegada	6–3, 6–2
Victoria	31-07-2021	(Colombia) J3 Bogotá	Arcilla	(Brazil) Carolina Xavier Laydner	(Chile) Alessandra Cáceres (Colombia) Gabriela Rondón	7–6, 6–1
Derrota	13-11-2021	(Bolivia) J2 La Paz	Arcilla	(Argentina) Luciana Moyano	(Slovakia) Nikola Daubnerova (Japan) Mao Mushika	3–6, 6–7
Derrota	09-04-2022	(Peru) JB1 Lima	Arcilla	(Argentina) Luciana Moyano	(Paraguay) Leyla Britez (Paraguay) Paulina Franco	5–7, 6–0, 9–11
Victoria	25-06-2022	(United Kingdom) J1 Nottingham	Césped	(Argentina) Luciana Moyano	(Slovenia) Ela Milic (Argentina) Lucía Peyre	6–2, 6–0
Victoria	22-10-2022	(Uruguay) J2 Punta del Este	Arcilla	(Argentina) Luciana Moyano	(Ecuador) Valentina Ponce (Ecuador) Valeska San Martín	6–0, 6–4
Victoria	29-10-2022	(Argentina) J2 Neuquén	Arcilla	(Argentina) Luciana Moyano	(Argentina) Luna Cinalli (Argentina) Candela Vázquez	6–1, 6–3
Victoria	18-02-2023	(Peru) J300 Lima	Arcilla	(United States) Kaitlin Quevedo	(United States) Mia Slama (Japan) Wakana Sonobe	5–7, 6–3, 10–7
Victoria	01-04-2023	(Bolivia) J300 Santa Cruz	Arcilla	(Argentina) Luciana Moyano	(Ecuador) Valentina Serrano (Ecuador) Valeska San Martín	6–0, 6–2
