= Oleksandra Oliynykova =

Ukrainian tennis player (born 2001)

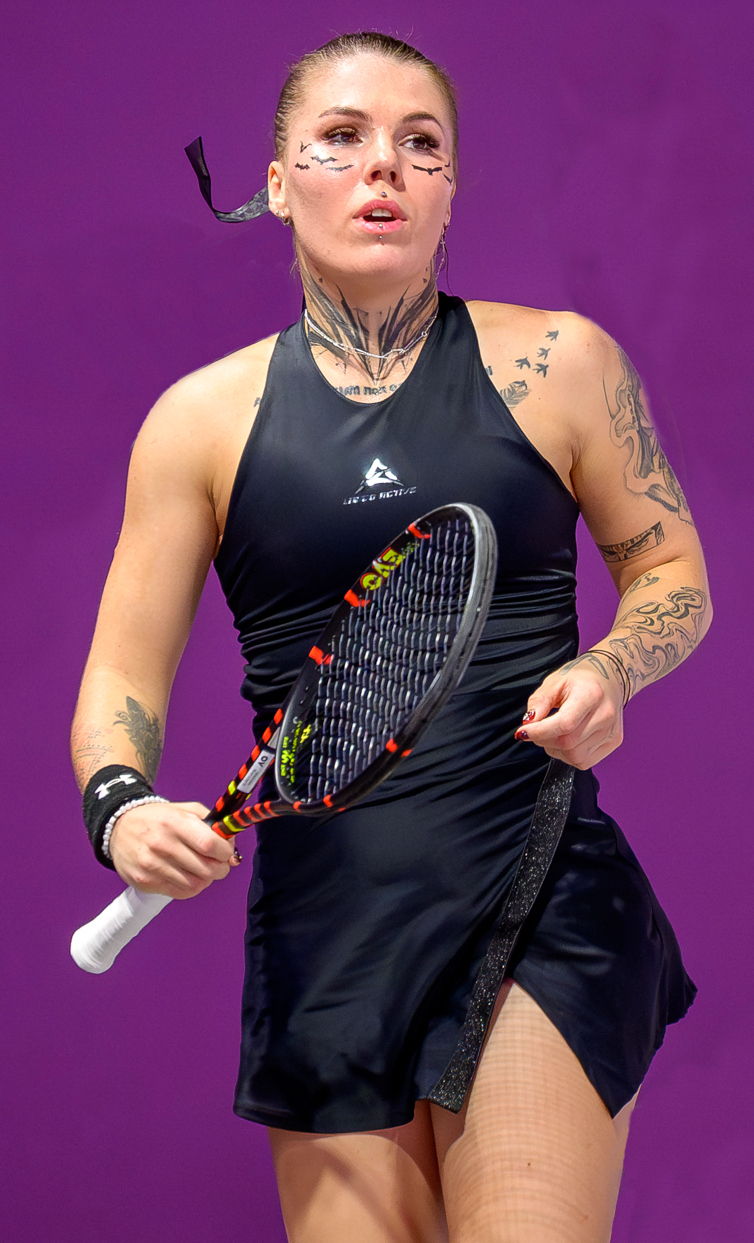
- Oliynykova at the 2026 Transylvania Open
- Full name: Oleksandra Denysivna Oliynykova
- Native name: Олександра Денисівна Олійникова
- Country (sports): Croatia (2017–2022); Ukraine (2022–present)
- Residence: Kyiv, Ukraine
- Born: 3 January 2001 (age 25) Kyiv, Ukraine
- Prize money: $1,099,669

Singles
- Career record: 308–156
- Career titles: 3 WTA 125
- Highest ranking: No. 41 (14 September 2026)
- Current ranking: No. 70 (9 November 2026)

Grand Slam singles results
- Australian Open: 1R (2026)
- French Open: 3R (2026)
- Wimbledon: 1R (2026)
- US Open: 2R (2026)

Doubles
- Career record: 61–57
- Career titles: 2 ITF
- Highest ranking: No. 663 (6 May 2024)
- Current ranking: No. 1,121 (14 September 2026)

Grand Slam doubles results
- French Open: 1R (2026)
- Wimbledon: 1R (2026)
- US Open: 1R (2026)
- Last updated on: 20 September 2026.

Oleksandra Denysivna Oliynykova (Ukrainian: Олександра Денисівна Олійникова; born 3 January 2001) is a Ukrainian professional tennis player. She has career-high rankings of world No. 44 in singles, achieved on 27 July 2026, and 663 in doubles, reached on 6 May 2024. She has won three WTA 125 singles titles as well as ten singles and two doubles titles on the ITF Women's World Tour.

== Early life ==
Oliynykova was born and raised in Kyiv. At the age of eight, she and her family moved to Odesa. In 2011, when Oliynykova was 10 years old, she and her family fled to Croatia after her father publicly criticized the presidency of Viktor Yanukovych. Her family would have been able to return to Ukraine after the Revolution of Dignity in 2014, which saw the removal of Yanukovych from office; they stayed in Croatia, however, where she obtained Croatian citizenship.

Oliynykova continued to live and train in Zagreb, but as of 2026 was living and training in Kyiv, describing herself as the only Ukrainian professional tennis player to continue training in Ukraine following the Russian invasion of Ukraine in 2022.

== Career ==
=== 2022: Turning professional ===
Oliynykova began representing Ukraine in 2022. That October, she won her second ITF title at the W15 tournament in Heraklion.

=== 2024: First WTA 125 win ===
In August, she won the W35 tournament in Køge, defeating Deborah Chiesa in the final. Later that month, she reached the final of the W35 Țiriac Foundation Trophy in Bistrița, but lost to Patricia Maria Țig. In October, she won her second title of the year at the W35 tournament in Heraklion.

The following month, she qualified for the main draw of the Copa LP Chile and defeated Martina Capurro Taborda in the first round for her first WTA 125-level victory.

=== 2025: Three WTA 125 titles, top 100 ===
In May, she won the W35 Fortevillage trophy in Santa Margherita di Pula, but later lost her ranking points and was fined by the WTA for not withdrawing from the qualifiers of the Open de Saint-Malo, for which she was registered as an alternate, in time. The following week, however, she won another title in Santa Margherita di Pula. Later that month, she also won the W50 tournament in Portorož, defeating Kajsa Rinaldo Persson in the final for her biggest title to date.

In September, Oliynykova won her first WTA 125 title at the Tolentino Open, defeating Nuria Brancaccio in the final. In November, Oliynykova defeated Mayar Sherif in the final at the Tucumán Open to claim her second WTA 125 title. The following week, Oliynykova won the WTA 125 Copa Chile, overcoming Léolia Jeanjean in the final and moving into the top 100 at world No. 95 for the first time, on 24 November 2025.

=== 2026: Major & BJK Cup debuts, two WTA Tour semifinals, top 50 ===
Oliynykova made her Grand Slam debut at the Australian Open where she directly entered the main draw, but lost to defending champion Madison Keys. In February at the Transylvania Open, Oliynykova recorded wins over Mayar Sherif, eighth seed Anna Bondár and fourth seed Wang Xinyu to reach her first WTA Tour semifinal,which she lost to top seed Emma Raducanu in three sets. The following month she made it through to the final at the Antalya Challenger 2, losing in three sets to fellow Ukrainian player Anhelina Kalinina.

Oliynykova made her debut for the Ukraine Billie Jean King Cup team team in their qualifier against Poland in Gliwice in April, defeating Linda Klimovičová in a dead rubber match after her team had already won the overall tie.

At the Italian Open, she defeated Petra Martić for her first win at WTA 1000 level. Oliynykova then advanced when 18th seed Clara Tauson retired due to injury during their second round match, before losing to 13th seed Linda Nosková in the third round. Oliynykova overcame qualifier Elena Pridankina.and Kimberly Birrell to reach the third round at French Open, at which point she lost to 20th seed Diana Shnaider.

Seeded third at the Iași Open, she recorded wins lucky loser İpek Öz, qualifier Elena Pridankina and wildcard entrant Clara Burel, before losing in the semifinals to Mayar Sherif.

Ranked at a new career-high of world No. 45 and as top seed at the Hamburg Open, Oliynykova defeated wildcard entrant Nastasja Schunk and Leyre Romero Gormaz to make it into the quarterfinals. She then withdrew from the tournament due to injury.

In September at the US Open, she overcame wildcard entrant Reese Brantmeier for her first main draw match win at this major, before losing to 17th seed Alexandra Eala in the second round.

== Performance timeline ==
Key
W	F	SF	QF	#R	RR	Q#	DNQ	A	NH

(W) winner; (F) finalist; (SF) semifinalist; (QF) quarterfinalist; (#R) rounds 4, 3, 2, 1; (RR) round-robin stage; (Q#) qualification round; (DNQ) did not qualify; (A) absent; (NH) not held; (SR) strike rate (events won / competed); (W–L) win–loss record.
To avoid confusion and double counting, these charts are updated at the conclusion of a tournament or when the player's participation has ended.

=== Singles ===
Tournament	2025	2026	W–L
Grand Slam tournaments
Australian Open	A	1R	0–1
French Open	A	3R	2–1
Wimbledon	Q1	1R	0–1
US Open	Q1	2R	1–1
Win–Loss	0–0	3–4	3–4
WTA 1000 tournaments
Madrid Open	A	1R	0–1
Italian Open	A	3R	2–1
Canadian Open	A	1R	0–1
Cincinnati Open	A	2R	1–1
China Open	A	1R	0–1
Win–Loss	0–0	3–5	3–5

== WTA 125 finals ==
=== Singles: 4 (3 titles, 1 runner-up) ===
Result	W–L	Date	Tournament	Surface	Opponent	Score
Win	1–0	Sep 2025	Tolentino Open, Italy	Clay	(Italy) Nuria Brancaccio	6–2, 6–0
Win	2–0	Nov 2025	Challenger Tucumán, Argentina	Clay	(Egypt) Mayar Sherif	3–6, 6–2, 6–2
Win	3–0	Nov 2025	Colina Challenger, Chile	Clay	(France) Léolia Jeanjean	7–5, 6–1
Loss	3–1	Mar 2026	Antalya Challenger, Turkey	Clay	(Ukraine) Anhelina Kalinina	3–6, 6–3, 2–6

== ITF Circuit finals ==
=== Singles: 15 (10 titles, 5 runner-ups) ===
Legend W75 tournaments (1–0) W50 tournaments (1–0) W35 tournaments (4–1) W15 tournaments (4–4)	Finals by surface Clay (10–5)

Result	W–L	Date	Tournament	Tier	Surface	Opponent	Score
Win	1–0	Nov 2018	ITF Heraklion, Greece	W15	Clay	(Poland) Anna Hertel	7–6^{(3)}, 7–6^{(4)}
Loss	1–1	Jun 2019	ITF Heraklion, Greece	W15	Clay	(Romania) Oana Gavrilă	1–6, 3–6
Loss	1–2	Sep 2019	ITF Anning, China	W15	Clay	(Kazakhstan) Zhibek Kulambayeva	3–6, 5–7
Loss	1–3	Dec 2019	ITF Heraklion, Greece	W15	Clay	(United States) Chiara Scholl	2–6, 7–5, 1–6
Win	2–3	Oct 2022	ITF Heraklion, Greece	W15	Clay	(Hungary) Vanda Lukács	6–4, 1–0 ret.
Win	3–3	Nov 2022	ITF Heraklion, Greece	W15	Clay	(Germany) Silvia Ambrosio	6–3, 7–5
Loss	3–4	Apr 2023	ITF Telde, Spain	W15	Clay	(Italy) Laura Mair	5–7, 2–6
Win	4–4	Apr 2023	ITF Telde, Spain	W15	Clay	(Lithuania) Klaudija Bubelytė	6–3, 6–1
Win	5–4	Jul 2024	ITF Køge, Denmark	W35	Clay	(Italy) Deborah Chiesa	6–7^{(3)}, 6–0, 6–3
Loss	5–5	Aug 2024	ITF Bistrița, Romania	W35	Clay	(Romania) Patricia Maria Țig	1–6, 1–6
Win	6–5	Oct 2024	ITF Heraklion, Greece	W35	Clay	(Romania) Irina Bara	6–4, 6–1
Win	7–5	Apr 2025	ITF Santa Margherita di Pula, Italy	W35	Clay	(Italy) Dalila Spiteri	5–7, 6–2, 6–2
Win	8–5	May 2025	ITF Santa Margherita di Pula, Italy	W35	Clay	Ekaterina Makarova	6–4, 6–0
Win	9–5	May 2025	ITF Portorož, Slovenia	W50	Clay	(Sweden) Kajsa Rinaldo Persson	3–6, 6–2, 6–4
Win	10–5	Jul 2025	ITF The Hague, Netherlands	W75	Clay	(Italy) Jessica Pieri	6–1, 6–3

=== Doubles: 6 (2 titles, 4 runner-ups) ===
Legend
W35 tournaments (2–3)
W15 tournaments (0–1)

Result	W–L	Date	Tournament	Tier	Surface	Partner	Opponents	Score
Loss	0–1	May 2019	ITF Heraklion, Greece	W15	Clay	Darya Astakhova	(Greece) Anna Arkadianou; Elina Nepliy	2–6, 4–6
Loss	0–2	Dec 2019	ITF Heraklion, Greece	W15	Clay	(Israel) Lina Glushko	(Hungary) Dorka Drahota-Szabó (Slovakia) Laura Svatíková	2–6, 4–6
Win	1–2	Jan 2020	ITF Antalya, Turkey	W15	Clay	(Greece) Sapfo Sakellaridi	Vasilisa Aponasenko (Italy) Nicole Fossa Huergo	6–2, 6–2
Win	2–2	Oct 2022	ITF Heraklion, Greece	W15	Clay	(United Kingdom) Lauryn John-Baptiste	(Italy) Ginevra Parentini (North Macedonia) Aleksandra Simeva	6–0, 6–1
Loss	2–3	May 2023	ITF Varberg, Sweden	W15	Clay	(Denmark) Olivia Gram	(Ukraine) Daria Lopatetska (Ukraine) Daria Yesypchuk	walkover
Loss	2–4	Feb 2024	ITF Antalya, Turkey	W35	Clay	(Romania) Cristina Dinu	(Spain) Ángela Fita Boluda (Latvia) Daniela Vismane	4–6, 0–6
