= 2019 ITF Women's World Tennis Tour =

Details
- Duration: 31 December 2018 – 5 January 2020
- Edition: 26th
- Tournaments: 554
- Categories: W100 tournaments (14); W80 tournaments (11); W60 tournaments (51); W25 tournaments (200); W15 tournaments (278)

Achievements (singles)
- Most titles: (Netherlands) Arantxa Rus (10)
- Most finals: (Netherlands) Arantxa Rus (11)

The 2019 International Tennis Federation (ITF) Women's World Tennis Tour is a second-tier tour for women's professional tennis. It is organized by the International Tennis Federation and is a tier below the Women's Tennis Association (WTA) Tour. The ITF Women's World Tennis Tour includes tournaments with prize money ranging from $15,000 to $100,000. The ITF Women's World Tennis Tour is the product of reforms designed to support talented junior players in their progression to the senior game, and target the prize money effectively at professional tournaments to enable more players to make a living.

== Participating host nations ==
- Argentina (ARG)
- Australia (AUS)
- Austria (AUT)
- Belarus (BLR)
- Belgium (BEL)
- Bolivia (BOL)
- Bosnia and Herzegovina (BIH)
- Brazil (BRA)
- Bulgaria (BUL)
- Canada (CAN)
- Chile (CHI)
- China (CHN)
- Chinese Taipei (TPE)
- Colombia (COL)
- Croatia (CRO)
- Czech Republic (CZE)
- Ecuador (ECU)
- Egypt (EGY)
- Estonia (EST)
- Finland (FIN)
- France (FRA)
- Georgia (GEO)
- Germany (GER)
- Great Britain (GBR)
- Greece (GRE)
- Guatemala (GUA)
- Hong Kong (HKG)
- Hungary (HUN)
- India (IND)
- Indonesia (INA)
- Ireland (IRL)
- Israel (ISR)
- Italy (ITA)
- Japan (JPN)
- Kazakhstan (KAZ)
- Kenya (KEN)
- Luxembourg (LUX)
- Mexico (MEX)
- Montenegro (MNE)
- Netherlands (NED)
- Nigeria (NGR)
- Norway (NOR)
- Paraguay (PAR)
- Peru (PER)
- Poland (POL)
- Portugal (POR)
- Romania (ROU)
- Russia (RUS)
- Serbia (SRB)
- Singapore (SGP)
- Slovakia (SVK)
- South Africa (RSA)
- South Korea (KOR)
- Spain (ESP)
- Sweden (SWE)
- Switzerland (SUI)
- Thailand (THA)
- Trinidad and Tobago (TTO)
- Tunisia (TUN)
- Turkey (TUR)
- Ukraine (UKR)
- United Arab Emirates (UAE)
- United States (USA)
- Uzbekistan (UZB)

== Tournament breakdown by event category ==
Event category	Number of events	Total prize money
W100	14	$1,400,000
W80	11	$880,000
W60	51	$3,060,000
W25	200	$5,000,000
W15	278	$4,170,000
Total	554	$14,510,000

== Ranking points distribution ==
Category	W	F	SF	QF	R16	R32	Q	Q2	Q1
↓ WTA ranking Points ↓
W100+H (S)	150	90	55	28	14	1	6	4	–
W100+H (D)	150	90	55	28	1	–	–	–	–
W100 (S)	140	85	50	25	13	1	6	4	–
W100 (D)	140	85	50	25	1	–	–	–	–
W80+H (S)	130	80	48	24	12	1	5	3	–
W80+H (D)	130	80	48	24	1	–	–	–	–
W80 (S)	115	70	42	21	10	1	5	3	–
W80 (D)	115	70	42	21	1	–	–	–	–
W60+H (S)	100	60	36	18	9	1	5	3	–
W60+H (D)	100	60	36	18	1	–	–	–	–
W60 (S)	80	48	29	15	8	1	5	3	–
W60 (D)	80	48	29	15	1	–	–	–	–
W25+H (S)	60	36	22	11	6	1	2	–	–
W25+H (D)	60	36	22	11	1	–	–	–	–
W25 (S)	50	30	18	9	5	1	1	–	–
W25 (D)	50	30	18	9	1	–	–	–	–
W15+H (S) / W15 (S)	10	6	4	2	1	–	–	–	–
W15+H (D) / W15 (D)	10	6	4	1	–	–	–	–	–
↓ ITF World Tennis Ranking Points ↓
W25+H (S)	–	–	–	–	–	–	4	1	–
W25 (S)	–	–	–	–	–	–	3	1	–
W15+H (S)	150	90	45	18	6	0	3	1	–
W15+H (D)	150	90	45	6	0	–	–	–	–
W15 (S)	100	60	30	12	4	0	2	1	–
W15 (D)	100	60	30	4	0	–	–	–	–

- "+H" indicates that hospitality is provided.

== Prize money distribution ==
Category	W	F	SF	QF	R16	R32	FQR (24/48Q)	FQR (32Q)	Q1 (24Q); Q2 (48Q)	Q1 (32Q)
W100+H (S) / W100 (S)	$15,239	$8,147	$4,473	$2,573	$1,559	$926	$509	$381.75	$316	$237
W100+H (D) / W100 (D)	$5,573	$2,787	$1,393	$760	$507	–	–	–	–	–
W80+H (S) / W80 (S)	$12,192	$6,518	$3,580	$2,059	$1,248	$740	$407	$305.25	$253	$189.75
W80+H (D) / W80 (D)	$4,460	$2,230	$1,115	$608	$405	–	–	–	–	–
W60+H (S) / W60 (S)	$9,142	$4,886	$2,683	$1,543	$935	$557	$305	$228.75	$189	$141.75
W60+H (D) / W60 (D)	$3,344	$1,672	$836	$456	$304	–	–	–	–	–
W25+H (S) / W25 (S)	$3,935	$2,107	$1,162	$672	$408	$244	$126	$96.50	$68	$50
W25+H (D) / W25 (D)	$1,437	$719	$359	$196	$131	–	–	–	–	–
W15+H (S) / W15 (S)	$2,352	$1,470	$734	$367	$294	$147	–	–	–	–
W15+H (D) / W15 (D)	$955	$515	$294	$147	$74	–	–	–	–	–

- Doubles prize money per team

== Statistics ==
=== Key ===
Category
W100 tournaments
W80 tournaments
W60 tournaments
W25 tournaments
W15 tournaments

These tables present the number of singles (S) and doubles (D) titles won by each player and each nation during the season. The players/nations are sorted by:

1. Total number of titles (a doubles title won by two players representing the same nation counts as only one win for the nation)
2. A singles > doubles hierarchy
3. Alphabetical order (by family names for players).

To avoid confusion and double counting, these tables should be updated only after all events of the week are completed.

=== Titles won by player ===
2019 Titles won by player

Total	Player	W100		W80		W60		W25		W15		Total	
Total	Player	S	D	S	D	S	D	S	D	S	D	S	D
13	Marcela Zacarías (MEX)								3	5	5	5	8
11	Arantxa Rus (NED)							10	1			10	1
10	Chanel Simmonds (RSA)							2	2	3	3	5	5
9	Noelia Zeballos (BOL)									2	7	2	7
8	Seone Mendez (AUS)							1		6	1	7	1
8	Mayar Sherif (EGY)							2	1	4	1	6	2
8	Kamilla Rakhimova (RUS)						1	3	1	2	1	5	3
8	Anastasia Zakharova (RUS)							1		4	3	5	3
8	İpek Soylu (TUR)							2	2	2	2	4	4
8	Oana Georgeta Simion (ROU)									4	4	4	4
8	Lesley Pattinama Kerkhove (NED)						1	3	4			3	5
8	Nefisa Berberović (BIH)									2	6	2	6
8	Eva Vedder (NED)									2	6	2	6
8	Anastasia Dețiuc (CZE)						1		5	1	1	1	7
8	Paige Hourigan (NZL)								6	1	1	1	7
8	Hsu Chieh-yu (TPE)								6	1	1	1	7
8	María José Portillo Ramírez (MEX)								1	1	6	1	7
7	Yuki Naito (JPN)							3	2	2		5	2
7	Anna Turati (ITA)									4	3	4	3
7	Han Na-lae (KOR)		1					3	3			3	4
7	Usue Maitane Arconada (USA)				2	1		2	2			3	4
7	Lee Pei-chi (TPE)								3	3	1	3	4
7	Amina Anshba (RUS)						1		3	2	1	2	5
7	Lina Gjorcheska (MKD)						1		3	2	1	2	5
7	Justina Mikulskytė (LTU)									2	5	2	5
7	Julia Wachaczyk (GER)								3	1	3	1	6
7	Oana Gavrilă (ROU)									1	6	1	6
7	Ulrikke Eikeri (NOR)						1		6			0	7
7	Eudice Chong (HKG)								7			0	7
7	Aldila Sutjiadi (INA)								7			0	7
6	Vitalia Diatchenko (RUS)					3		3				6	0
6	Lou Brouleau (FRA)									4	2	4	2
6	Despina Papamichail (GRE)							2	1	1	2	3	3
6	Anastasiya Komardina (RUS)							1	3	2		3	3
6	Dasha Ivanova (USA)									3	3	3	3
6	Yuliana Lizarazo (COL)									3	3	3	3
6	Thaisa Grana Pedretti (BRA)									3	3	3	3
6	Caroline Dolehide (USA)		1		2	2			1			2	4
6	Zheng Wushuang (CHN)						1			2	3	2	4
6	Laura Ioana Paar (ROU)							1	3	1	1	2	4
6	Ángela Fita Boluda (ESP)									2	4	2	4
6	Vladica Babić (MNE)						1		2	1	2	1	5
6	Johana Marková (CZE)								2	1	3	1	5
6	Jiang Xinyu (CHN)		1				2		3			0	6
6	Anna Danilina (KAZ)						1		5			0	6
5	Varvara Gracheva (RUS)					2		3				5	0
5	Eléonora Molinaro (LUX)							2		3		5	0
5	Anastasia Kulikova (FIN)									4	1	4	1
5	Lizette Cabrera (AUS)			1		2	1		1			3	2
5	Maja Chwalińska (POL)					1	1	2	1			3	2
5	Fernanda Brito (CHI)									3	2	3	2
5	Asia Muhammad (USA)		1		1		1	2				2	3
5	Cristina Bucșa (ESP)					1		1	3			2	3
5	Fernanda Contreras (MEX)							1	1	1	2	2	3
5	Georgia Crăciun (ROU)							1	1	1	2	2	3
5	Suzan Lamens (NED)								1	2	2	2	3
5	Anna Morgina (RUS)								1	2	2	2	3
5	Simona Waltert (SUI)								1	2	2	2	3
5	Xenia Knoll (SUI)		1		1		1		1	1		1	4
5	Choi Ji-hee (KOR)		1						3	1		1	4
5	Jessika Ponchet (FRA)						4	1				1	4
5	Rebeka Masarova (ESP)						2			1	2	1	4
5	Estelle Cascino (FRA)								4	1		1	4
5	Martina Colmegna (ITA)								2	1	2	1	4
5	Tayisiya Morderger (GER)								2	1	2	1	4
5	Chiara Scholl (USA)								2	1	2	1	4
5	Silvia Njirić (CRO)								1	1	3	1	4
5	Nika Radišič (SLO)								1	1	3	1	4
5	Malene Helgø (NOR)									1	4	1	4
5	Ekaterina Kazionova (RUS)									1	4	1	4
5	Sarah Lee (USA)									1	4	1	4
5	Georgina García Pérez (ESP)		2				1		2			0	5
5	Tang Qianhui (CHN)		1				2		2			0	5
5	Luisa Stefani (BRA)		1				1		3			0	5
5	Vivian Heisen (GER)				1				4			0	5
5	Hayley Carter (USA)						2		3			0	5
5	Paula Cristina Gonçalves (BRA)						1		4			0	5
5	Sofia Shapatava (GEO)								5			0	5
5	Emily Webley-Smith (GBR)								5			0	5
5	Kanako Morisaki (JPN)								2		3	0	5
5	Mariana Dražić (CRO)										5	0	5
5	Aiko Yoshitomi (JPN)										5	0	5
4	Barbora Krejčíková (CZE)			1		2		1				4	0
4	Clara Tauson (DEN)					2				2		4	0
4	Indy de Vroome (NED)					1		2		1		4	0
4	Mirjam Björklund (SWE)							1		3		4	0
4	Zhu Lin (CHN)	1	1			1		1				3	1
4	Danka Kovinić (MNE)	1						2	1			3	1
4	Nina Stojanović (SRB)			1		2	1					3	1
4	Elisabetta Cocciaretto (ITA)					2	1	1				3	1
4	Rebecca Šramková (SVK)					2	1	1				3	1
4	Elena Rybakina (KAZ)					1		2	1			3	1
4	Maryna Chernyshova (UKR)					1			1	2		3	1
4	Maddison Inglis (AUS)						1	3				3	1
4	Bianca Turati (ITA)							2		1	1	3	1
4	Victoria Kan (RUS)							1	1	2		3	1
4	Magali Kempen (BEL)									3	1	3	1
4	Daria Kruzhkova (RUS)									3	1	3	1
4	Carole Monnet (FRA)									3	1	3	1
4	You Xiaodi (CHN)					1	1	1	1			2	2
4	Giulia Gatto-Monticone (ITA)						1	2	1			2	2
4	Ganna Poznikhirenko (UKR)								1	2	1	2	2
4	Guillermina Naya (ARG)									2	2	2	2
4	Jazmín Ortenzi (ARG)									2	2	2	2
4	Caroline Roméo (FRA)									2	2	2	2
4	Junri Namigata (JPN)				1			1	2			1	3
4	Storm Sanders (AUS)					1	2		1			1	3
4	Belinda Woolcock (AUS)					1			2		1	1	3
4	Marina Melnikova (RUS)							1	3			1	3
4	Gabriela Talabă (ROU)							1	3			1	3
4	Alba Carrillo Marín (ESP)									1	3	1	3
4	Celia Cerviño Ruiz (ESP)									1	3	1	3
4	Viktoryia Kanapatskaya (BLR)									1	3	1	3
4	Fanny Östlund (SWE)									1	3	1	3
4	Mariia Tkacheva (RUS)									1	3	1	3
4	Aurora Zantedeschi (ITA)									1	3	1	3
4	Arina Rodionova (AUS)						3		1			0	4
4	Rutuja Bhosale (IND)								4			0	4
4	Dalma Gálfi (HUN)								4			0	4
4	Katharina Hobgarski (GER)								4			0	4
4	Wu Fang-hsien (TPE)								4			0	4
4	Elixane Lechemia (FRA)								3		1	0	4
4	Laura Pigossi (BRA)								3		1	0	4
4	Victoria Rodríguez (MEX)								3		1	0	4
4	Yana Morderger (GER)								2		2	0	4
4	Emily Arbuthnott (GBR)								1		3	0	4
4	Tamara Čurović (SRB)								1		3	0	4
4	Veronika Erjavec (SLO)								1		3	0	4
4	Francisca Jorge (POR)								1		3	0	4
4	Melanie Klaffner (AUT)								1		3	0	4
4	Daria Mishina (RUS)								1		3	0	4
4	Ayaka Okuno (JPN)								1		3	0	4
4	Maya Tahan (ISR)								1		3	0	4
4	Noelia Bouzó Zanotti (ESP)										4	0	4
4	Nadia Echeverría Alam (VEN)										4	0	4
4	Haine Ogata (JPN)										4	0	4
4	Taisya Pachkaleva (RUS)										4	0	4
4	Melis Sezer (TUR)										4	0	4
4	Stéphanie Visscher (NED)										4	0	4
3	Barbara Haas (AUT)					1		2				3	0
3	Hailey Baptiste (USA)							3				3	0
3	Daria Lopatetska (UKR)							3				3	0
3	Tena Lukas (CRO)							3				3	0
3	Wang Xinyu (CHN)							3				3	0
3	Daria Snigur (UKR)							2		1		3	0
3	Heather Watson (GBR)	1				1	1					2	1
3	Valeria Savinykh (RUS)		1					2				2	1
3	Katerina Stewart (USA)			1					1	1		2	1
3	Madison Brengle (USA)					2	1					2	1
3	Isabella Shinikova (BUL)					1	1	1				2	1
3	Lee Ya-hsuan (TPE)							2	1			2	1
3	Jesika Malečková (CZE)							2	1			2	1
3	Aleksandrina Naydenova (BUL)							2	1			2	1
3	Ankita Raina (IND)							2	1			2	1
3	Andreea Mitu (ROU)							1	1	1		2	1
3	Darya Astakhova (RUS)									2	1	2	1
3	Viktoriia Dema (UKR)									2	1	2	1
3	Ingrid Gamarra Martins (BRA)									2	1	2	1
3	Mahak Jain (IND)									2	1	2	1
3	Vanda Lukács (HUN)									2	1	2	1
3	Elena Malõgina (EST)									2	1	2	1
3	Andreea Prisăcariu (ROU)									2	1	2	1
3	Adriana Reami (USA)									2	1	2	1
3	Sandra Samir (EGY)									2	1	2	1
3	Natasha Subhash (USA)									2	1	2	1
3	Taylor Townsend (USA)	1	1		1							1	2
3	Olga Govortsova (BLR)		1				1	1				1	2
3	Marie Bouzková (CZE)			1	1		1					1	2
3	Mandy Minella (LUX)			1			2					1	2
3	Nicoleta Dascălu (ROU)					1	2					1	2
3	Ekaterine Gorgodze (GEO)						2	1				1	2
3	Maryna Zanevska (BEL)						2	1				1	2
3	Moyuka Uchijima (JPN)						2			1		1	2
3	Destanee Aiava (AUS)						1	1	1			1	2
3	Anna Bondár (HUN)						1	1	1			1	2
3	Leylah Annie Fernandez (CAN)						1	1	1			1	2
3	Eri Hozumi (JPN)						1	1	1			1	2
3	Sofya Lansere (RUS)						1	1	1			1	2
3	Naiktha Bains (GBR)							1	2			1	2
3	Réka Luca Jani (HUN)							1	2			1	2
3	Samantha Murray (GBR)							1	2			1	2
3	Guo Hanyu (CHN)							1	1		1	1	2
3	Carolina Alves (BRA)								2	1		1	2
3	Marina Bassols Ribera (ESP)								2	1		1	2
3	Adrienn Nagy (HUN)								1	1	1	1	2
3	Zhang Ying (CHN)								1	1	1	1	2
3	Federica Arcidiacono (ITA)									1	2	1	2
3	Elina Avanesyan (RUS)									1	2	1	2
3	Yvonne Cavallé Reimers (ESP)									1	2	1	2
3	Arianne Hartono (NED)									1	2	1	2
3	Aneta Laboutková (CZE)									1	2	1	2
3	İpek Öz (TUR)									1	2	1	2
3	Julia Stamatova (BUL)									1	2	1	2
3	Anna Blinkova (RUS)		1		1		1					0	3
3	Beatrice Gumulya (INA)				1		1		1			0	3
3	Ingrid Neel (USA)				1		1		1			0	3
3	Haruka Kaji (JPN)				1				2			0	3
3	Kimberley Zimmermann (BEL)				1				2			0	3
3	Robin Anderson (USA)						2		1			0	3
3	Andrea Gámiz (VEN)						2		1			0	3
3	Caitlin Whoriskey (USA)						2		1			0	3
3	Naomi Broady (GBR)						1		2			0	3
3	Chang Kai-chen (TPE)						1		2			0	3
3	Cristina Dinu (ROU)						1		2			0	3
3	Hsu Ching-wen (TPE)						1		2			0	3
3	Eden Silva (GBR)						1		2			0	3
3	Mana Ayukawa (JPN)								3			0	3
3	Gabriela Cé (BRA)								3			0	3
3	Feng Shuo (CHN)								3			0	3
3	Sarah Beth Grey (GBR)								3			0	3
3	Anastasia Grymalska (ITA)								3			0	3
3	Erika Sema (JPN)								3			0	3
3	Ekaterina Yashina (RUS)								3			0	3
3	Minori Yonehara (JPN)								3			0	3
3	Quirine Lemoine (NED)								2		1	0	3
3	Angelica Moratelli (ITA)								2		1	0	3
3	Angelina Gabueva (RUS)								1		2	0	3
3	Bárbara Gatica (CHI)								1		2	0	3
3	Guo Meiqi (CHN)								1		2	0	3
3	Kim Na-ri (KOR)								1		2	0	3
3	Olga Parres Azcoitia (ESP)								1		2	0	3
3	Rebeca Pereira (BRA)								1		2	0	3
3	Nikola Tomanová (CZE)								1		2	0	3
3	Ioana Gașpar (ROU)										3	0	3
3	Chiara Grimm (SUI)										3	0	3
3	Caijsa Hennemann (SWE)										3	0	3
3	Sabastiani León (USA)										3	0	3
3	María Paulina Pérez (COL)										3	0	3
3	Eduarda Piai (BRA)										3	0	3
3	Anna Popescu (GBR)										3	0	3
3	Rina Saigo (JPN)										3	0	3
3	Yukina Saigo (JPN)										3	0	3
3	Alina Silich (RUS)										3	0	3
3	Carla Touly (FRA)										3	0	3
2	Ana Bogdan (ROU)	1						1				2	0
2	Katarina Zavatska (UKR)	1						1				2	0
2	Zarina Diyas (KAZ)			1				1				2	0
2	Anna Kalinskaya (RUS)					1		1				2	0
2	Allie Kiick (USA)					1		1				2	0
2	Tamara Korpatsch (GER)					1		1				2	0
2	Jasmine Paolini (ITA)					1		1				2	0
2	Francesca Jones (GBR)							2				2	0
2	Lu Jiajing (CHN)							2				2	0
2	Ma Shuyue (CHN)							2				2	0
2	Camila Osorio (COL)							2				2	0
2	Pemra Özgen (TUR)							2				2	0
2	Nuria Párrizas Díaz (ESP)							2				2	0
2	Nadia Podoroska (ARG)							2				2	0
2	Urszula Radwańska (POL)							2				2	0
2	Stefania Rubini (ITA)							2				2	0
2	Cindy Burger (NED)									2		2	0
2	María Lourdes Carlé (ARG)									2		2	0
2	Georgia Drummy (IRL)									2		2	0
2	Julieta Lara Estable (ARG)									2		2	0
2	Daria Kudashova (RUS)									2		2	0
2	Lu Jiaxi (CHN)									2		2	0
2	Elizabeth Mandlik (USA)									2		2	0
2	Lisa Pigato (ITA)									2		2	0
2	Laura Schaeder (GER)									2		2	0
2	Ekaterina Shalimova (RUS)									2		2	0
2	Lulu Sun (SUI)									2		2	0
2	Patricia Maria Țig (ROU)									2		2	0
2	Rosa Vicens Mas (ESP)									2		2	0
2	Lucie Hradecká (CZE)		1					1				1	1
2	Han Xinyun (CHN)				1	1						1	1
2	Ellen Perez (AUS)					1	1					1	1
2	Sara Errani (ITA)					1			1			1	1
2	Rebecca Marino (CAN)					1			1			1	1
2	Akgul Amanmuradova (UZB)						1	1				1	1
2	Claire Liu (USA)						1	1				1	1
2	Jamie Loeb (USA)						1	1				1	1
2	Paula Ormaechea (ARG)						1	1				1	1
2	Yuan Yue (CHN)						1	1				1	1
2	Riya Bhatia (IND)							1	1			1	1
2	Lea Bošković (CRO)							1	1			1	1
2	Jodie Anna Burrage (GBR)							1	1			1	1
2	Julia Grabher (AUT)							1	1			1	1
2	Eva Guerrero Álvarez (ESP)							1	1			1	1
2	Richèl Hogenkamp (NED)							1	1			1	1
2	Jang Su-jeong (KOR)							1	1			1	1
2	Katarzyna Kawa (POL)							1	1			1	1
2	Elitsa Kostova (BUL)							1	1			1	1
2	Andrea Lázaro García (ESP)							1	1			1	1
2	Chihiro Muramatsu (JPN)							1	1			1	1
2	Astra Sharma (AUS)							1	1			1	1
2	Sara Sorribes Tormo (ESP)							1	1			1	1
2	Abigail Tere-Apisah (PNG)							1	1			1	1
2	Nigina Abduraimova (UZB)								1	1		1	1
2	Sabina Sharipova (UZB)								1	1		1	1
2	Mira Antonitsch (AUT)									1	1	1	1
2	Mathilde Armitano (FRA)									1	1	1	1
2	Amanda Carreras (GBR)									1	1	1	1
2	Montserrat González (PAR)									1	1	1	1
2	Merel Hoedt (NED)									1	1	1	1
2	Ange Oby Kajuru (JPN)									1	1	1	1
2	Natsumi Kawaguchi (JPN)									1	1	1	1
2	Zhibek Kulambayeva (KAZ)									1	1	1	1
2	Lee Eun-hye (KOR)									1	1	1	1
2	Marta Leśniak (POL)									1	1	1	1
2	Evgeniya Levashova (RUS)									1	1	1	1
2	Emilie Lindh (GBR)									1	1	1	1
2	Tamara Malešević (SRB)									1	1	1	1
2	Taylor Ng (USA)									1	1	1	1
2	Vanessa Ong (USA)									1	1	1	1
2	Manca Pislak (SLO)									1	1	1	1
2	Lisa Ponomar (GER)									1	1	1	1
2	Alice Ramé (FRA)									1	1	1	1
2	Margaux Rouvroy (FRA)									1	1	1	1
2	Camilla Scala (ITA)									1	1	1	1
2	Sofia Sewing (USA)									1	1	1	1
2	Draginja Vuković (SRB)									1	1	1	1
2	Nao Hibino (JPN)		2									0	2
2	Duan Yingying (CHN)		1		1							0	2
2	Manon Arcangioli (FRA)				1				1			0	2
2	Quinn Gleason (USA)				1				1			0	2
2	Jessy Rompies (INA)				1				1			0	2
2	Irina Bara (ROU)						2					0	2
2	Yanina Wickmayer (BEL)						2					0	2
2	Rosalie van der Hoek (NED)						1		1			0	2
2	Kyōka Okamura (JPN)						1		1			0	2
2	Raluca Șerban (CYP)						1		1			0	2
2	Ena Shibahara (JPN)						1		1			0	2
2	Xun Fangying (CHN)						1		1			0	2
2	Alison Bai (AUS)								2			0	2
2	Emina Bektas (USA)								2			0	2
2	Elena Bogdan (ROU)								2			0	2
2	Alena Fomina (RUS)								2			0	2
2	Valentini Grammatikopoulou (GRE)								2			0	2
2	Hsieh Yu-chieh (TPE)								2			0	2
2	Tereza Mihalíková (SVK)								2			0	2
2	Polina Monova (RUS)								2			0	2
2	Tara Moore (GBR)								2			0	2
2	Abbie Myers (AUS)								2			0	2
2	Katarzyna Piter (POL)								2			0	2
2	Lara Salden (BEL)								2			0	2
2	Ana Sofía Sánchez (MEX)								2			0	2
2	Alicia Barnett (GBR)								1		1	0	2
2	Brynn Boren (USA)								1		1	0	2
2	Başak Eraydın (TUR)								1		1	0	2
2	Anna Hertel (POL)								1		1	0	2
2	Mana Kawamura (JPN)								1		1	0	2
2	Shavit Kimchi (ISR)								1		1	0	2
2	Funa Kozaki (JPN)								1		1	0	2
2	Karolína Kubáňová (CZE)								1		1	0	2
2	Ksenia Palkina (KGZ)								1		1	0	2
2	Gaia Sanesi (ITA)								1		1	0	2
2	Cemre Anıl (TUR)										2	0	2
2	Madison Appel (USA)										2	0	2
2	Ulyana Ayzatulina (RUS)										2	0	2
2	Karola Patricia Bejenaru (ROU)										2	0	2
2	Karolína Beránková (CZE)										2	0	2
2	Candela Bugnon (ARG)										2	0	2
2	Jacqueline Cabaj Awad (SWE)										2	0	2
2	Cao Siqi (CHN)										2	0	2
2	Patcharin Cheapchandej (THA)										2	0	2
2	Elle Christensen (USA)										2	0	2
2	Oana Smaranda Corneanu (ROU)										2	0	2
2	Giulia Crescenzi (ITA)										2	0	2
2	Gabriella Da Silva-Fick (AUS)										2	0	2
2	Jenny Dürst (SUI)										2	0	2
2	Klára Hájková (CZE)										2	0	2
2	Weronika Falkowska (POL)										2	0	2
2	Melany Krywoj (ARG)										2	0	2
2	Martyna Kubka (POL)										2	0	2
2	Fernanda Labraña (CHI)										2	0	2
2	Bojana Marinković (SRB)										2	0	2
2	Marie Mettraux (SUI)										2	0	2
2	Victoria Mikhaylova (RUS)										2	0	2
2	Elena Milovanović (SRB)										2	0	2
2	Melissa Morales (GUA)										2	0	2
2	Ángeles Moreno Barranquero (ESP)										2	0	2
2	Stela Peeva (BUL)										2	0	2
2	Aleksandra Pospelova (RUS)										2	0	2
2	Alica Rusová (SVK)										2	0	2
2	Mara Schmidt (USA)										2	0	2
2	Natalia Siedliska (GER)										2	0	2
2	Vitalia Stamat (MDA)										2	0	2
2	Julyette Steur (GER)										2	0	2
2	Laura Svatíková (SVK)										2	0	2
2	Chelsea Vanhoutte (BEL)										2	0	2
2	Melis Yasar (SWE)										2	0	2
2	Allura Zamarripa (USA)										2	0	2
2	Maribella Zamarripa (USA)										2	0	2
2	Zhao Qianqian (CHN)										2	0	2
1	Lauren Davis (USA)	1										1	0
1	Magda Linette (POL)	1										1	0
1	Caty McNally (USA)	1										1	0
1	Monica Niculescu (ROU)	1										1	0
1	Peng Shuai (CHN)	1										1	0
1	Bernarda Pera (USA)	1										1	0
1	Alison Riske (USA)	1										1	0
1	Zhang Shuai (CHN)	1										1	0
1	Kristína Kučová (SVK)			1								1	0
1	Christina McHale (USA)			1								1	0
1	Whitney Osuigwe (USA)			1								1	0
1	Viktoriya Tomova (BUL)			1								1	0
1	Olga Danilović (SRB)					1						1	0
1	Francesca Di Lorenzo (USA)					1						1	0
1	Katy Dunne (GBR)					1						1	0
1	Mayo Hibi (JPN)					1						1	0
1	Ylena In-Albon (SUI)					1						1	0
1	Kim Da-bin (KOR)					1						1	0
1	Shelby Rogers (USA)					1						1	0
1	Wang Xiyu (CHN)					1						1	0
1	Tessah Andrianjafitrimo (FRA)							1				1	0
1	Paula Badosa (ESP)							1				1	0
1	Susan Bandecchi (SUI)							1				1	0
1	Mariam Bolkvadze (GEO)							1				1	0
1	Çağla Büyükakçay (TUR)							1				1	0
1	Martina Caregaro (ITA)							1				1	0
1	Louisa Chirico (USA)							1				1	0
1	Jaqueline Cristian (ROU)							1				1	0
1	Kathinka von Deichmann (LIE)							1				1	0
1	Océane Dodin (FRA)							1				1	0
1	Varvara Flink (RUS)							1				1	0
1	Anna-Lena Friedsam (GER)							1				1	0
1	Myrtille Georges (FRA)							1				1	0
1	Nicole Gibbs (USA)							1				1	0
1	Catherine Harrison (USA)							1				1	0
1	Erina Hayashi (JPN)							1				1	0
1	Miharu Imanishi (JPN)							1				1	0
1	Jovana Jakšić (SRB)							1				1	0
1	Ivana Jorović (SRB)							1				1	0
1	Kaja Juvan (SLO)							1				1	0
1	Anhelina Kalinina (UKR)							1				1	0
1	Sesil Karatantcheva (BUL)							1				1	0
1	Deniz Khazaniuk (ISR)							1				1	0
1	Natalija Kostić (SRB)							1				1	0
1	Lee Hua-chen (TPE)							1				1	0
1	Ann Li (USA)							1				1	0
1	Nudnida Luangnam (THA)							1				1	0
1	Guiomar Maristany (ESP)							1				1	0
1	Tereza Martincová (CZE)							1				1	0
1	Grace Min (USA)							1				1	0
1	Greet Minnen (BEL)							1				1	0
1	Sada Nahimana (BDI)							1				1	0
1	Jule Niemeier (GER)							1				1	0
1	Akiko Omae (JPN)							1				1	0
1	Risa Ozaki (JPN)							1				1	0
1	Dejana Radanović (SRB)							1				1	0
1	Emma Raducanu (GBR)							1				1	0
1	Olivia Rogowska (AUS)							1				1	0
1	Daniela Seguel (CHI)							1				1	0
1	Katie Swan (GBR)							1				1	0
1	Jil Teichmann (SUI)							1				1	0
1	Martina Trevisan (ITA)							1				1	0
1	Shiho Akita (JPN)									1		1	0
1	Petia Arshinkova (BUL)									1		1	0
1	Michaela Bayerlová (CZE)									1		1	0
1	Hanna Chang (USA)									1		1	0
1	Corinna Dentoni (ITA)									1		1	0
1	Salma Djoubri (FRA)									1		1	0
1	Shiori Fukuda (JPN)									1		1	0
1	Julie Gervais (FRA)									1		1	0
1	Ilona Georgiana Ghioroaie (ROU)									1		1	0
1	Alice Gillan (GBR)									1		1	0
1	Claudia Giovine (ITA)									1		1	0
1	María Gutiérrez Carrasco (ESP)									1		1	0
1	Kaia Kanepi (EST)									1		1	0
1	Karin Kennel (SUI)									1		1	0
1	Bojana Klincov (SUI)									1		1	0
1	Nastja Kolar (SLO)									1		1	0
1	Ku Yeon-woo (KOR)									1		1	0
1	Anna Kubareva (BLR)									1		1	0
1	Polina Kudermetova (RUS)									1		1	0
1	Nika Kukharchuk (RUS)									1		1	0
1	Leonie Küng (SUI)									1		1	0
1	Raphaëlle Lacasse (CAN)									1		1	0
1	Ana Lantigua de la Nuez (ESP)									1		1	0
1	Jessica Livianu (USA)									1		1	0
1	Daria Lodikova (RUS)									1		1	0
1	Lara Michel (SUI)									1		1	0
1	Yuriko Lily Miyazaki (JPN)									1		1	0
1	Magdaléna Pantůčková (CZE)									1		1	0
1	Park So-hyun (KOR)									1		1	0
1	Júlia Payola (ESP)									1		1	0
1	Catalina Pella (ARG)									1		1	0
1	Ioana Loredana Roșca (ROU)									1		1	0
1	Himeno Sakatsume (JPN)									1		1	0
1	Kennedy Shaffer (USA)									1		1	0
1	Nika Shytkouskaya (BLR)									1		1	0
1	Layne Sleeth (CAN)									1		1	0
1	Lucrezia Stefanini (ITA)									1		1	0
1	Jade Suvrijn (FRA)									1		1	0
1	Maria Timofeeva (RUS)									1		1	0
1	Marion Viertler (ITA)									1		1	0
1	Daniela Vismane (LAT)									1		1	0
1	Cody Wong Hong-yi (HKG)									1		1	0
1	Marina Yudanov (SWE)									1		1	0
1	Joanne Züger (SUI)									1		1	0
1	Jennifer Brady (USA)		1									0	1
1	Alexa Guarachi (CHI)		1									0	1
1	Beatriz Haddad Maia (BRA)		1									0	1
1	Oksana Kalashnikova (GEO)		1									0	1
1	Miyu Kato (JPN)		1									0	1
1	Andreja Klepač (SLO)		1									0	1
1	Makoto Ninomiya (JPN)		1									0	1
1	Erin Routliffe (NZL)		1									0	1
1	Fanny Stollár (HUN)		1									0	1
1	Amandine Hesse (FRA)				1							0	1
1	Harmony Tan (FRA)				1							0	1
1	Mélodie Collard (CAN)						1					0	1
1	Harriet Dart (GBR)						1					0	1
1	Martina Di Giuseppe (ITA)						1					0	1
1	Natela Dzalamidze (RUS)						1					0	1
1	Vania King (USA)						1					0	1
1	Angela Kulikov (USA)						1					0	1
1	Hiroko Kuwata (JPN)						1					0	1
1	Liang En-shuo (TPE)						1					0	1
1	Cornelia Lister (SWE)						1					0	1
1	Sanaz Marand (USA)						1					0	1
1	Kaylah McPhee (AUS)						1					0	1
1	Rianna Valdes (USA)						1					0	1
1	Sachia Vickery (USA)						1					0	1
1	Renata Voráčová (CZE)						1					0	1
1	Haruna Arakawa (JPN)								1			0	1
1	Lara Arruabarrena (ESP)								1			0	1
1	Marie Benoît (BEL)								1			0	1
1	Irene Burillo Escorihuela (ESP)								1			0	1
1	Jacqueline Cako (USA)								1			0	1
1	Berfu Cengiz (TUR)								1			0	1
1	Alina Charaeva (RUS)								1			0	1
1	Chen Pei-hsuan (TPE)								1			0	1
1	Freya Christie (GBR)								1			0	1
1	Federica Di Sarra (ITA)								1			0	1
1	Olga Doroshina (RUS)								1			0	1
1	Katharine Fahey (USA)								1			0	1
1	Emily Fanning (NZL)								1			0	1
1	Irina Fetecău (ROU)								1			0	1
1	Jana Fett (CRO)								1			0	1
1	Jaimee Fourlis (AUS)								1			0	1
1	Cori Gauff (USA)								1			0	1
1	Katharina Gerlach (GER)								1			0	1
1	Yuliya Hatouka (BLR)								1			0	1
1	Valentina Ivakhnenko (RUS)								1			0	1
1	Vivien Juhászová (SVK)								1			0	1
1	Marta Kostyuk (UKR)								1			0	1
1	Vlada Koval (RUS)								1			0	1
1	Michaëlla Krajicek (NED)								1			0	1
1	Petra Krejsová (CZE)								1			0	1
1	Ksenia Laskutova (RUS)								1			0	1
1	Polina Leykina (RUS)								1			0	1
1	Maegan Manasse (USA)								1			0	1
1	Giorgia Marchetti (ITA)								1			0	1
1	Pamela Montez (USA)								1			0	1
1	Alana Parnaby (AUS)								1			0	1
1	Marine Partaud (FRA)								1			0	1
1	Tatiana Pieri (ITA)								1			0	1
1	Peangtarn Plipuech (THA)								1			0	1
1	Ivana Popovic (AUS)								1			0	1
1	Lisa Sabino (SUI)								1			0	1
1	Bibiane Schoofs (NED)								1			0	1
1	Anastasiya Shoshyna (UKR)								1			0	1
1	Yana Sizikova (RUS)								1			0	1
1	Chantal Škamlová (SVK)								1			0	1
1	Alicia Smith (AUS)								1			0	1
1	Anna Smith (GBR)								1			0	1
1	Nina Stadler (SUI)								1			0	1
1	Barbora Štefková (CZE)								1			0	1
1	Valeriya Strakhova (UKR)								1			0	1
1	Tamarine Tanasugarn (THA)								1			0	1
1	Julia Terziyska (BUL)								1			0	1
1	Olivia Tjandramulia (AUS)								1			0	1
1	Panna Udvardy (HUN)								1			0	1
1	Ramu Ueda (JPN)								1			0	1
1	Eva Wacanno (NED)								1			0	1
1	Stephanie Wagner (GER)								1			0	1
1	Wu Meixu (CHN)								1			0	1
1	Xu Shilin (CHN)								1			0	1
1	Ye Qiuyu (CHN)								1			0	1
1	Anna Zaja (GER)								1			0	1
1	Renata Zarazúa (MEX)								1			0	1
1	Anastasia Zarycká (CZE)								1			0	1
1	Hind Abdelouahid (USA)										1	0	1
1	Lamis Alhussein Abdel Aziz (EGY)										1	0	1
1	Ilinca Dalina Amariei (ROU)										1	0	1
1	Ani Amiraghyan (ARM)										1	0	1
1	Emily Appleton (GBR)										1	0	1
1	Anna Arkadianou (GRE)										1	0	1
1	Polina Bakhmutkina (RUS)										1	0	1
1	Paula Barañano (ARG)										1	0	1
1	Loudmilla Bencheikh (FRA)										1	0	1
1	Jessica Bertoldo (ITA)										1	0	1
1	Maëlys Bougrat (FRA)										1	0	1
1	Nuria Brancaccio (ITA)										1	0	1
1	Savannah Broadus (USA)										1	0	1
1	Astrid Wanja Brune Olsen (NOR)										1	0	1
1	Miriam Bulgaru (ROU)										1	0	1
1	Martina Capurro Taborda (ARG)										1	0	1
1	Romina Ccuno (PER)										1	0	1
1	Alessia Beatrice Ciucă (ROU)										1	0	1
1	Mary Closs (USA)										1	0	1
1	Ali Collins (GBR)										1	0	1
1	Émeline Dartron (FRA)										1	0	1
1	Yekaterina Dmitrichenko (KAZ)										1	0	1
1	Sofia Dmitrieva (RUS)										1	0	1
1	Dorka Drahota-Szabó (HUN)										1	0	1
1	Aubane Droguet (FRA)										1	0	1
1	Vlada Ekshibarova (ISR)										1	0	1
1	Jennifer Elie (USA)										1	0	1
1	Cristina Ene (ROU)										1	0	1
1	Tiphanie Fiquet (FRA)										1	0	1
1	Natasha Fourouclas (RSA)										1	0	1
1	Nicole Gadient (SUI)										1	0	1
1	Eva Garkusha (RUS)										1	0	1
1	Joanna Garland (TPE)										1	0	1
1	Nadja Gilchrist (USA)										1	0	1
1	Mylène Halemai (FRA)										1	0	1
1	Isabelle Haverlag (NED)										1	0	1
1	Magdalena Hędrzak (POL)										1	0	1
1	María Herazo González (COL)										1	0	1
1	Jessica Hinojosa Gómez (MEX)										1	0	1
1	Hong Seung-yeon (KOR)										1	0	1
1	Gabriela Horáčková (CZE)										1	0	1
1	Claudia Hoste Ferrer (ESP)										1	0	1
1	Kristýna Hrabalová (CZE)										1	0	1
1	Margarita Ignatjeva (LAT)										1	0	1
1	Valentina Ivanov (NZL)										1	0	1
1	Jana Jablonovská (SVK)										1	0	1
1	Paulina Jastrzębska (POL)										1	0	1
1	Léolia Jeanjean (FRA)										1	0	1
1	Jeong Su-nam (KOR)										1	0	1
1	Jeong Yeong-won (KOR)										1	0	1
1	Matilde Jorge (POR)										1	0	1
1	Robu Kajitani (JPN)										1	0	1
1	Dominique Karregat (NED)										1	0	1
1	Anna Klasen (GER)										1	0	1
1	Madeleine Kobelt (USA)										1	0	1
1	Júlia Konishi Camargo Silva (BRA)										1	0	1
1	Eleni Kordolaimi (GRE)										1	0	1
1	Ayumi Koshiishi (JPN)										1	0	1
1	Punnin Kovapitukted (THA)										1	0	1
1	Maria Kozyreva (RUS)										1	0	1
1	Elena Kraleva (BUL)										1	0	1
1	Katarína Kužmová (SVK)										1	0	1
1	Louise Kwong (CAN)										1	0	1
1	Margarita Lazareva (RUS)										1	0	1
1	Valentina Losciale (ITA)										1	0	1
1	Ma Yexin (CHN)										1	0	1
1	Anna Makhorkina (RUS)										1	0	1
1	Linnéa Malmqvist (SWE)										1	0	1
1	Laura Maluniaková (SVK)										1	0	1
1	Yasmine Mansouri (FRA)										1	0	1
1	Maria Marfutina (RUS)										1	0	1
1	Amber Marshall (AUS)										1	0	1
1	Lisa Mays (AUS)										1	0	1
1	Rasheeda McAdoo (USA)										1	0	1
1	Ana Bianca Mihăilă (ROU)										1	0	1
1	Nell Miller (GBR)										1	0	1
1	Tamachan Momkoonthod (THA)										1	0	1
1	Mu Shouna (CHN)										1	0	1
1	Gabriella Mujan (NED)										1	0	1
1	Thasaporn Naklo (THA)										1	0	1
1	Gyulnara Nazarova (RUS)										1	0	1
1	Elina Nepliy (RUS)										1	0	1
1	Malkia Ngounoue (USA)										1	0	1
1	Ni Ma Zhuoma (CHN)										1	0	1
1	Oona Orpana (FIN)										1	0	1
1	Katyarina Paulenka (BLR)										1	0	1
1	Veronika Pepelyaeva (RUS)										1	0	1
1	Laïa Petretic (FRA)										1	0	1
1	Maria Petrovic (SWE)										1	0	1
1	Aleksandra Pitak (GBR)										1	0	1
1	Katarzyna Pitak (GBR)										1	0	1
1	Jessica Plazas (COL)										1	0	1
1	Federica Prati (ITA)										1	0	1
1	Anastasia Pribylova (RUS)										1	0	1
1	Anna Pribylova (RUS)										1	0	1
1	Angelica Raggi (ITA)										1	0	1
1	Irina Ramialison (FRA)										1	0	1
1	Nadia Ravita (INA)										1	0	1
1	Vinciane Rémy (FRA)										1	0	1
1	Anna Sinclair Rogers (USA)										1	0	1
1	Camila Romero (ECU)										1	0	1
1	Andreea Roșca (ROU)										1	0	1
1	Christina Rosca (USA)										1	0	1
1	Noel Saidenova (RUS)										1	0	1
1	Sathwika Sama (IND)										1	0	1
1	Mananchaya Sawangkaew (THA)										1	0	1
1	Watsachol Sawatdee (THA)										1	0	1
1	Sheng Yuqi (CHN)										1	0	1
1	Anna Sisková (CZE)										1	0	1
1	Alessandra Simone (ITA)										1	0	1
1	Tina Nadine Smith (AUS)										1	0	1
1	Martina Spigarelli (ITA)										1	0	1
1	Joëlle Steur (GER)										1	0	1
1	Tess Sugnaux (SUI)										1	0	1
1	Sun Xuliu (CHN)										1	0	1
1	Shalimar Talbi (BLR)										1	0	1
1	Gabriela Nicole Tătăruș (ROU)										1	0	1
1	Gabriella Taylor (GBR)										1	0	1
1	Marie Temin (FRA)										1	0	1
1	Anastasia Tikhonova (RUS)										1	0	1
1	María Toran Ribes (ESP)										1	0	1
1	Alice Tubello (FRA)										1	0	1
1	Anna Ukolova (RUS)										1	0	1
1	Nazari Urbina (MEX)										1	0	1
1	Anna Ureke (RUS)										1	0	1
1	Eliessa Vanlangendonck (BEL)										1	0	1
1	Arina Gabriela Vasilescu (ROU)										1	0	1
1	Alexandra Viktorovitch (SWE)										1	0	1
1	Andrea Renée Villarreal (MEX)										1	0	1
1	Ingrid Vojčináková (SVK)										1	0	1
1	Amber Washington (USA)										1	0	1
1	Kirsten-Andrea Weedon (GUA)										1	0	1
1	Sem Wensveen (NED)										1	0	1
1	Tiffany William (GBR)										1	0	1
1	Pauline Wuarin (SUI)										1	0	1
1	Joanna Zawadzka (POL)										1	0	1
1	Anastasia Zolotareva (RUS)										1	0	1
1	Vera Zvonareva (RUS)										1	0	1

=== Titles won by nation ===
2019 Titles won by nation

Total	Nation	W100		W80		W60		W25		W15		Total	
Total	Nation	S	D	S	D	S	D	S	D	S	D	S	D
129	Russia (RUS)		2		1	6	4	18	24	31	43	55	74
112	United States (USA)	5	2	3	4	8	12	15	17	18	28	49	63
62	Romania (ROU)	2				1	5	6	13	14	21	23	39
58	Italy (ITA)					4	2	10	10	15	17	29	29
56	Japan (JPN)		2		1	1	3	10	15	9	15	20	36
55	Spain (ESP)		2			1	3	8	10	12	19	21	34
51	Netherlands (NED)					1	2	16	10	9	13	26	25
51	China (CHN)	3	2		1	4	5	11	10	5	10	23	28
50	France (FRA)				2		4	4	6	16	18	20	30
46	Australia (AUS)			1		5	6	8	13	6	7	20	26
45	Great Britain (GBR)	1				2	3	6	16	3	14	12	33
41	Czech Republic (CZE)		1	2	1	2	3	5	9	5	13	14	27
33	Germany (GER)				1	1		3	12	5	11	9	24
30	Brazil (BRA)		1				2		12	6	9	6	24
29	Switzerland (SUI)		1		1	1	1	2	3	10	10	13	16
28	Mexico (MEX)							1	9	7	11	8	20
26	Chinese Taipei (TPE)						2	3	14	4	3	7	19
23	Ukraine (UKR)	1				1		7	5	7	2	16	7
21	Serbia (SRB)			1		3	1	4	1	2	9	10	11
21	Turkey (TUR)							5	4	3	9	8	13
20	Argentina (ARG)						1	3		9	7	12	8
19	Poland (POL)	1				1	1	5	4	1	6	8	11
18	Hungary (HUN)		1				1	2	8	3	3	5	13
18	Belgium (BEL)				1		4	2	4	3	4	5	13
17	South Korea (KOR)		1			1		4	4	4	3	9	8
17	Bulgaria (BUL)			1		1	1	5	3	2	4	9	8
17	Slovakia (SVK)			1		2	1	1	4		8	4	13
16	Sweden (SWE)						1	1		5	9	6	10
16	Croatia (CRO)							4	3	1	8	5	11
15	Kazakhstan (KAZ)			1		1	1	3	6	1	2	6	9
13	Slovenia (SLO)		1					1	1	3	7	4	9
12	Egypt (EGY)							2	1	6	3	8	4
12	India (IND)							3	6	2	1	5	7
12	Colombia (COL)							2		3	7	5	7
12	Chile (CHI)		1					1	1	3	6	4	8
12	Norway (NOR)						1		6	1	4	1	11
11	Austria (AUT)					1		3	2	1	4	5	6
11	Belarus (BLR)		1				1	1	1	3	4	4	7
11	South Africa (RSA)							1	3	3	4	4	7
11	New Zealand (NZL)		1						7	1	2	1	10
11	Indonesia (INA)				1		1		8		1	0	11
10	Montenegro (MNE)	1					1	2	3	1	2	4	6
10	Greece (GRE)							2	3	1	4	3	7
10	Georgia (GEO)		1				2	2	5			2	8
9	Bolivia (BOL)									2	7	2	7
8	Luxembourg (LUX)			1			2	2		3		6	2
8	Bosnia and Herzegovina (BIH)									2	6	2	6
8	Hong Kong (HKG)								7	1		1	7
7	Canada (CAN)					1	1	1	1	2	1	4	3
7	North Macedonia (MKD)						1		3	2	1	2	5
7	Lithuania (LTU)									2	5	2	5
7	Thailand (THA)							1	2		4	1	6
7	Israel (ISR)							1	1		5	1	6
7	Venezuela (VEN)						2		1		4	0	7
6	Finland (FIN)									4	2	4	2
6	Uzbekistan (UZB)						1	1	2	2		3	3
5	Portugal (POR)								1	1	3	1	4
4	Denmark (DEN)					2				2		4	0
4	Estonia (EST)									3	1	3	1
2	Ireland (IRL)									2		2	0
2	Papua New Guinea (PNG)							1	1			1	1
2	Latvia (LAT)									1	1	1	1
2	Paraguay (PAR)									1	1	1	1
2	Cyprus (CYP)						1		1			0	2
2	Kyrgyzstan (KGZ)								1		1	0	2
2	Guatemala (GUA)										2	0	2
2	Moldova (MDA)										2	0	2
1	Burundi (BDI)							1				1	0
1	Liechtenstein (LIE)							1				1	0
1	Armenia (ARM)										1	0	1
1	Ecuador (ECU)										1	0	1
1	Peru (PER)										1	0	1

- Naiktha Bains began representing Great Britain in April. She won one singles and one doubles title while representing Australia.
- Ena Shibahara began representing Japan in July. She won two doubles titles while representing the United States.

== Retirements ==
Following is a list of notable players who announced their retirement from professional tennis, became inactive (after not playing for more than 52 weeks), or were permanently banned from playing, during the 2019 season:

- (Finland) Mia Eklund
- (Czech Republic) Kateřina Kramperová
- (France) Shérazad Reix
- (Switzerland) Amra Sadiković
- (Japan) Yuuki Tanaka
- (Croatia) Ana Vrljić

== See also ==
- 2019 WTA Tour
- 2019 WTA 125K series
- 2019 ATP Challenger Tour
- 2019 ITF Men's World Tennis Tour
