= Tennis at the 2018 Mediterranean Games – Women's singles =

Women's singles
- Tennis at the 2018 Mediterranean Games

Events
Singles	men	women
Doubles	men	women
- Mediterranean Games

The women's singles event at the 2018 Mediterranean Games was held from 26 to 30 June at the Tarragona Tennis Club.

Başak Eraydın of Turkey won the gold medal, defeating Fiona Ferro of France in the final, 6–7, 6–3, 6–3.

Veronika Erjavec of Slovenia won the bronze medal, defeating Lucia Bronzetti of Italy in the bronze medal match, 2–6, 6–4, 6–3.

== Medalists ==
Gold	Silver	Bronze
Başak Eraydın; Turkey	Fiona Ferro; France	Veronika Erjavec; Slovenia

== Seeds ==
1. Fiona Ferro (FRA) (final; silver medalist)
2. Başak Eraydın (TUR) (champion; gold medalist)
3. Harmony Tan (FRA) (quarterfinals)
4. Berfu Cengiz (TUR) (second round)
5. Dea Herdželaš (BIH) (second round)
6. Marina Bassols Ribera (ESP) (second round)
7. Lucrezia Stefanini (ITA) (quarterfinals)
8. Eva Guerrero Álvarez (ESP) (quarterfinals)

== Draw ==
Key

- Q = Qualifier
- WC = Wild card
- LL = Lucky loser
- Alt = Alternate
- ITF = ITF entry
- PR = Protected ranking
- SR = Special ranking
- SE = Special exempt
- JE = Junior exempt
- JR = Junior Accelerator Programme entrant
- CO = College Accelerator Programme entrant
- NG = Next Gen Accelerator Program entrant
- w/o = Walkover
- r = Retired
- d = Defaulted

=== Finals ===
Semifinals; 29 June
1	Fiona Ferro (FRA)	2	6	6
Veronika Erjavec (SLO)	6	4	1
Lucia Bronzetti (ITA)	3	5
2	Başak Eraydın (TUR)	6	7

Final; 30 June
1	Fiona Ferro (FRA)	7	3	3
2	Başak Eraydın (TUR)	6	6	6
Bronze medal match
Veronika Erjavec (SLO)	2	6	6
Lucia Bronzetti (ITA)	6	4	3

=== Top half ===
First round 26 June
E Omirou (CYP)	6	6
L Quitério (POR)	3	0
Y Boudjadi (ALG)	0	0
N Berberović (BIH)	6	6
B Ukëhaxhaj (KOS)	1	1
C Bechri (TUN)	6	6
E Antonakis (GRE)	2	5
V Erjavec (SLO)	6	7

Second round 27 June
1	F Ferro (FRA)	6	6
E Omirou (CYP)	2	0
N Berberović (BIH)	4	2
7	L Stefanini (ITA)	6	6
4	B Cengiz (TUR)	4	2
C Bechri (TUN)	6	6
V Erjavec (SLO)	6	6
6	M Bassols Ribera (ESP)	4	3

Quarterfinals; 28 June
1	F Ferro (FRA)	3	7	6
7	L Stefanini (ITA)	6	5	1
C Bechri (TUN)	2	1
V Erjavec (SLO)	6	6

Semifinals; 29 June
1	F Ferro (FRA)	2	6	6
V Erjavec (SLO)	6	4	1

=== Bottom half ===
First round 26 June
A Benaïssa (ALG)	0	3
A Arkadianou (GRE)	6	6
M Siopacha (CYP)	6	7
M Pislak (SLO)	3	6
I Murta (POR)	6	6
M Bouzgarrou (TUN)	0	1

Second round 27 June
5	D Herdželaš (BIH)	4	1
L Bronzetti (ITA)	6	6
A Arkadianou (GRE)	1	2
3	H Tan (FRA)	6	6
8	E Guerrero Álvarez (ESP)	2	6	6
M Siopacha (CYP)	6	0	1
I Murta (POR)	0	4
2	B Eraydın (TUR)	6	6

Quarterfinals; 28 June
L Bronzetti (ITA)	6	6
3	H Tan (FRA)	3	4
8	E Guerrero Álvarez (ESP)	4	2
2	B Eraydın (TUR)	6	6

Semifinals; 29 June
L Bronzetti (ITA)	3	5
2	B Eraydın (TUR)	6	7
