= Tennis at the 2018 Mediterranean Games – Women's doubles =

Women's doubles
- Tennis at the 2018 Mediterranean Games

Events
Singles	men	women
Doubles	men	women
- Mediterranean Games

The women's doubles event at the 2018 Mediterranean Games was held from 26 to 29 June at the Tarragona Tennis Club.

Başak Eraydın and İpek Öz of Turkey won the gold medal, defeating Nefisa Berberović and Dea Herdželaš of Bosnia and Herzegovina in the final, 0–6, 6–3, [12–10].

Marina Bassols Ribera and Eva Guerrero Álvarez of Spain won the bronze medal, defeating Fiona Ferro and Harmony Tan of France in the bronze medal match, 7–5, 7–5.

== Medalists ==
Gold	Silver	Bronze
Başak Eraydın and İpek Öz; Turkey	Nefisa Berberović and Dea Herdželaš; Bosnia and Herzegovina	Marina Bassols Ribera and Eva Guerrero Álvarez; Spain

== Seeds ==
1. Fiona Ferro / Harmony Tan (FRA) (semifinals; fourth place)
2. Başak Eraydın / İpek Öz (TUR) (champions; gold medalists)
3. Nefisa Berberović / Dea Herdželaš (BIH) (final; silver medalists)
4. Marina Bassols Ribera / Eva Guerrero Álvarez (ESP) (semifinals; bronze medalists)

== Draw ==
Key

- Q = Qualifier
- WC = Wild card
- LL = Lucky loser
- Alt = Alternate
- ITF = ITF entry
- PR = Protected ranking
- SR = Special ranking
- SE = Special exempt
- JE = Junior exempt
- JR = Junior Accelerator Programme entrant
- CO = College Accelerator Programme entrant
- NG = Next Gen Accelerator Program entrant
- w/o = Walkover
- r = Retired
- d = Defaulted

=== Draw ===
First round 26 June
C Bechri (TUN); M Bouzgarrou (TUN)	1	1
E Omirou (CYP); M Siopacha (CYP)	6	6
I Murta (POR); L Quitério (POR)	6	6
A Benaissa (ALG); Y Boudjadi (ALG)	1	2
V Erjavec (SLO); M Pislak (SLO)	4	3
L Bronzetti (ITA); L Stefanini (ITA)	6	6

Quarterfinals; 27 June
1	F Ferro (FRA); H Tan (FRA)	7	5	[10]
E Antonaki (GRE); A Arkadianou (GRE)	6	7	[4]
3	N Berberović (BIH); D Herdželaš (BIH)	7	6
E Omirou (CYP); M Siopacha (CYP)	6	2
I Murta (POR); L Quitério (POR)	4	4
4	M Bassols Ribera (ESP); E Guerrero Álvarez (ESP)	6	6
L Bronzetti (ITA); L Stefanini (ITA)	1	0
2	B Eraydın (TUR); İ Öz (TUR)	6	6

Semifinals; 28 June
1	F Ferro (FRA); H Tan (FRA)	7	4	[8]
3	N Berberović (BIH); D Herdželaš (BIH)	6	6	[10]
4	M Bassols Ribera (ESP); E Guerrero Álvarez (ESP)	2	1
2	B Eraydın (TUR); İ Öz (TUR)	6	6

Final; 29 June
3	N Berberović (BIH); D Herdželaš (BIH)	6	3	[10]
2	B Eraydın (TUR); İ Öz (TUR)	0	6	[12]
Bronze medal match 29 June
1	F Ferro (FRA); H Tan (FRA)	5	5
4	M Bassols Ribera (ESP); E Guerrero Álvarez (ESP)	7	7
