= Tennis at the 2018 Mediterranean Games – Men's singles =

Men's singles
- Tennis at the 2018 Mediterranean Games

Events
Singles	men	women
Doubles	men	women
- Mediterranean Games

The men's singles event at the 2018 Mediterranean Games was held from 26 to 30 June at the Tarragona Tennis Club.

Lamine Ouahab of Morocco won the gold medal, defeating Lucas Catarina of Monaco in the final, 6–2, 6–3.

Jacopo Berrettini of Italy won the bronze medal, defeating Amine Ahouda of Morocco in the bronze medal match, 6–0, 3–0 ret.

== Medalists ==
Gold	Silver	Bronze
Lamine Ouahab; Morocco	Lucas Catarina; Monaco	Jacopo Berrettini; Italy

== Seeds ==
1. Lucas Catarina (MON) (final; silver medalist)
2. Alexandre Müller (FRA) (quarterfinals)
3. Corentin Denolly (FRA) (quarterfinals)
4. Altuğ Çelikbilek (TUR) (first round)
5. Tomislav Jotovski (MKD) (second round)
6. Miguel Semmler (ESP) (first round)
7. Lamine Ouahab (MAR) (champion; gold medalist)
8. Giovanni Fonio (ITA) (first round)

== Draw ==
Key

- Q = Qualifier
- WC = Wild card
- LL = Lucky loser
- Alt = Alternate
- ITF = ITF entry
- PR = Protected ranking
- SR = Special ranking
- SE = Special exempt
- JE = Junior exempt
- JR = Junior Accelerator Programme entrant
- CO = College Accelerator Programme entrant
- NG = Next Gen Accelerator Program entrant
- w/o = Walkover
- r = Retired
- d = Defaulted

=== Finals ===
Semifinals; 29 June
1	Lucas Catarina (MON)	7	6
Amine Ahouda (MAR)	5	1
7	Lamine Ouahab (MAR)	6	6
Jacopo Berrettini (ITA)	2	2

Final; 30 June
1	Lucas Catarina (MON)	2	3
7	Lamine Ouahab (MAR)	6	6
Bronze medal match
Amine Ahouda (MAR)	0	0^{r}
Jacopo Berrettini (ITA)	6	3

=== Top half ===
First round 26 June
N Makhlouf (ALG)	7	6
A Ghorbel (TUN)	5	4
A Yüksel (TUR)	7	2	4
B Saraiva (POR)	6	6	6
T Kočevar-Dešman (SLO)	7	7
8	G Fonio (ITA)	6	6
H Habib (LBN)	7	2	7
Á López San Martín (ESP)	5	6	6
A Ahouda (MAR)	6	6
B Bytyqi (KOS)	0	2
E Neos (CYP)	2	1
5	T Jotovski (MKD)	6	6

Second round 27 June
1	L Catarina (MON)	6	5	7
N Makhlouf (ALG)	3	7	6
B Saraiva (POR)	6	6
T Kočevar-Dešman (SLO)	2	2
3	C Denolly (FRA)	6	6
H Habib (LBN)	3	4
A Ahouda (MAR)	2	6	6
5	T Jotovski (MKD)	6	0	3

Quarterfinals; 28 June
1	L Catarina (MON)	6	6
B Saraiva (POR)	2	4
3	C Denolly (FRA)	2	1
A Ahouda (MAR)	6	6

Semifinals; 29 June
1	L Catarina (MON)	7	6
A Ahouda (MAR)	5	1

=== Bottom half ===
First round 26 June
7	L Ouahab (MAR)	6	6
G Samaha (LBN)	1	1
M Urbanija (SLO)	6	6
M Hassan (ALG)	1	2
JB Poux (AND)	2	4
I Stergiou (GRE)	6	6
M Efstathiou (CYP)	7	6
4	A Çelikbilek (TUR)	6	1
6	M Semmler (ESP)	4	3
J Berrettini (ITA)	6	6
G Falcão (POR)	4	0
A Dougaz (TUN)	6	6
G Bajraliu (KOS)	6	6
M Zili (ALB)	1	0

Second round 27 June
7	L Ouahab (MAR)	4	6	6
M Urbanija (SLO)	6	1	2
I Stergiou (GRE)	5	1
M Efstathiou (CYP)	7	6
J Berrettini (ITA)	6	6
A Dougaz (TUN)	1	1
G Bajraliu (KOS)	2	1
2	A Müller (FRA)	6	6

Quarterfinals; 28 June
7	L Ouahab (MAR)	6	6
M Efstathiou (CYP)	0	3
J Berrettini (ITA)	6	6
2	A Müller (FRA)	4	0

Semifinals; 29 June
7	L Ouahab (MAR)	6	6
J Berrettini (ITA)	2	2
