= Tennis at the 2018 Mediterranean Games – Men's doubles =

Men's doubles
- Tennis at the 2018 Mediterranean Games

Events
Singles	men	women
Doubles	men	women
- Mediterranean Games

The men's doubles event at the 2018 Mediterranean Games was held from 26 to 29 June at the Tarragona Tennis Club.

Corentin Denolly and Alexandre Müller of France, won the gold medal, defeating Aziz Dougaz and Anis Ghorbel of Tunisia, in the final, 4–6, 7–6, [12–10].

Sarp Ağabigün and Anıl Yüksel of Turkey, won the bronze medal, defeating Gonçalo Falcão and Bernardo Saraiva of Portugal in the bronze medal match, 6–2, 3–6, [11–9].

== Medalists ==
Gold	Silver	Bronze
Corentin Denolly and Alexandre Müller; France	Aziz Dougaz and Anis Ghorbel; Tunisia	Sarp Ağabigün and Anıl Yüksel; Turkey

== Seeds ==
1. Gonçalo Falcão / Bernardo Saraiva (POR) (semifinals; fourth place)
2. Aziz Dougaz / Anis Ghorbel (TUN) (final; silver medalists)
3. Sarp Ağabigün / Anıl Yüksel (TUR) (semifinals; bronze medalists)
4. Corentin Denolly / Alexandre Müller (FRA) (champions; gold medalists)

== Draw ==
Key

- Q = Qualifier
- WC = Wild card
- LL = Lucky loser
- Alt = Alternate
- ITF = ITF entry
- PR = Protected ranking
- SR = Special ranking
- SE = Special exempt
- JE = Junior exempt
- JR = Junior Accelerator Programme entrant
- CO = College Accelerator Programme entrant
- NG = Next Gen Accelerator Program entrant
- w/o = Walkover
- r = Retired
- d = Defaulted

=== Draw ===
First round 26 June
M Hassan (ALG); A Ikhlef (ALG)	3	2
Á López San Martín (ESP); M Semmler (ESP)	6	6
T Kočevar-Dešman (SLO); M Urbanija (SLO)	6	6
J Berrettini (ITA); G Fonio (ITA)	4	4
G Bajraliu (KOS); B Bytyqi (KOS)	1	4
H Habib (LBN); G Samaha (LBN)	6	6
A Ahouda (MAR); L Ouahab (MAR)	6	7
M Efstathiou (CYP); E Neos (CYP)	4	6

Quarterfinals; 27 June
1	G Falcão (POR); B Saraiva (POR)	6	5	[10]
Á López San Martín (ESP); M Semmler (ESP)	4	7	[5]
4	C Denolly (FRA); A Müller (FRA)	7	3	[10]
T Kočevar-Dešman (SLO); M Urbanija (SLO)	6	6	[7]
H Habib (LBN); G Samaha (LBN)	3	4
3	S Ağabigün (TUR); A Yüksel (TUR)	6	6
A Ahouda (MAR); L Ouahab (MAR)	2	3
2	A Dougaz (TUN); A Ghorbel (TUN)	6	6

Semifinals; 28 June
1	G Falcão (POR); B Saraiva (POR)	1	5
4	C Denolly (FRA); A Müller (FRA)	6	7
3	S Ağabigün (TUR); A Yüksel (TUR)	5	6	[8]
2	A Dougaz (TUN); A Ghorbel (TUN)	7	1	[10]

Final; 29 June
4	C Denolly (FRA); A Müller (FRA)	4	7	[12]
2	A Dougaz (TUN); A Ghorbel (TUN)	6	6	[10]
Bronze medal match 29 June
1	G Falcão (POR); B Saraiva (POR)	2	6	[9]
3	S Ağabigün (TUR); A Yüksel (TUR)	6	3	[11]
