= Tennis at the 2018 Mediterranean Games =

- Venue: Tarragona Tennis Club
- Dates: 26–30 June

Tennis at the 2018 Mediterranean Games

Champions

Men's singles
- Lamine Ouahab; Morocco

Women's singles
- Başak Eraydın; Turkey

Men's doubles
- Corentin Denolly / Alexandre Müller (FRA)

Women's doubles
- Başak Eraydın / İpek Öz (TUR)
← 2013 ·	Mediterranean Games	· 2022 →

The tennis competitions at the 2018 Mediterranean Games in Tarragona will take place between 26 June and 30 June at the Tarragona Tennis Club. Athletes will compete in 4 events.

== Medal table ==
* Host nation (Spain)

Rank	Nation	Gold	Silver	Bronze	Total
1	Turkey	2	0	1	3
2	France	1	1	0	2
3	Morocco	1	0	0	1
4	Bosnia and Herzegovina	0	1	0	1
4	Monaco	0	1	0	1
4	Tunisia	0	1	0	1
7	Italy	0	0	1	1
7	Slovenia	0	0	1	1
7	Spain*	0	0	1	1
Totals (9 entries)		4	4	4	12

== Medalists ==
Event	Gold	Silver	Bronze
Men's singles	Lamine Ouahab; Morocco	Lucas Catarina; Monaco	Jacopo Berrettini; Italy
Men's doubles	Corentin Denolly and Alexandre Müller (FRA)	Aziz Dougaz and Anis Ghorbel (TUN)	Sarp Ağabigün and Anıl Yüksel (TUR)
Women's singles	Başak Eraydın; Turkey	Fiona Ferro; France	Veronika Erjavec; Slovenia
Women's doubles	Başak Eraydın and İpek Öz (TUR)	Nefisa Berberović and Dea Herdželaš (BIH)	Marina Bassols Ribera and Eva Guerrero Álvarez (ESP)
