= Corentin Denolly =

French tennis player

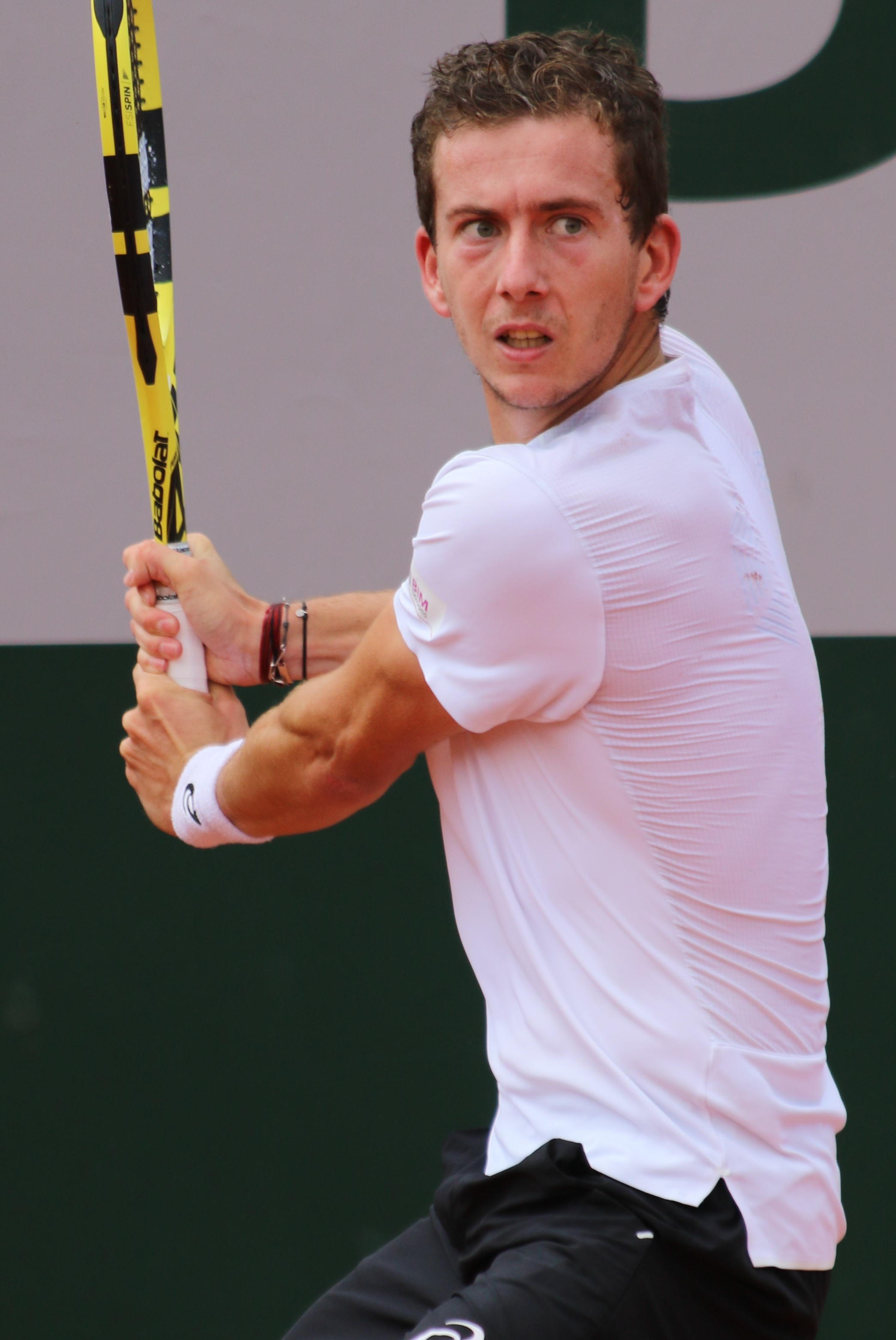
- Country (sports): France
- Residence: Boulogne Billancourt
- Born: 6 June 1997 (age 29) Vienne, Isère, France
- Height: 1.88 m (6 ft 2 in)
- Turned pro: 2015
- Plays: Left-handed (two handed-backhand)
- Coach: Olivier Ramos
- Prize money: US $322,927

Singles
- Career record: 1–1
- Career titles: 0
- Highest ranking: No. 270 (7 April 2025)
- Current ranking: No. 555 (9 November 2026)

Grand Slam singles results
- French Open: Q2 (2018, 2019)

Doubles
- Career record: 0–2
- Career titles: 0
- Highest ranking: No. 248 (29 July 2024)
- Current ranking: No. 648 (9 November 2026)

Grand Slam doubles results
- French Open: 1R (2018, 2020)
- Sports career
Medal record
Men's Tennis
Representing France
Mediterranean Games
Gold medal – first place	2018 Tarragona	Doubles
- Last updated on: 9 November 2026.

Corentin Denolly (born 6 June 1997) is a French tennis player. He has a career high ATP singles ranking of world No. 270 achieved on 7 April 2025 and a career high doubles ranking of No. 248 achieved on 29 July 2024.

== Career ==
=== 2015: Juniors ===
On the junior tour, Denolly had a career high combined ranking of world No. 3 achieved on 8 June 2015. He reached the semifinals of the 2015 French Open boys' singles event, losing to Taylor Fritz.

=== 2018: Grand Slam doubles debut ===
In June, Denolly made his Grand Slam doubles debut at the French Open, as a wildcard pair partnering with Alexandre Müller but they lost in the first round to Raven Klaasen and Michael Venus.

=== 2019: Maiden doubles Challenger title, Top 300 in singles ===
In June, Denolly won his maiden Challenger title in Blois, partnering with Alexandre Müller.

=== 2020: Second Roland Garros wildcard in doubles ===
In September, Denolly played his second Grand Slam match at the French Open, partnering with Kyrian Jacquet but they lost in the first round to eventual semifinalists Juan Sebastian Cabal and Robert Farah.

=== 2021-26: Doubles top 250, ATP singles debut & first win ===
Ranked No. 327 at the 2025 U.S. Men's Clay Court Championships Denolly qualified for the main draw making his ATP debut, with a win over third qualifying seed and compatriot Adrian Mannarino. He recorded his first ATP win over Brandon Holt in straight sets with two tiebreaks.

== Performance timeline ==
Key
W	F	SF	QF	#R	RR	Q#	DNQ	A	NH

(W) winner; (F) finalist; (SF) semifinalist; (QF) quarterfinalist; (#R) rounds 4, 3, 2, 1; (RR) round-robin stage; (Q#) qualification round; (DNQ) did not qualify; (A) absent; (NH) not held; (SR) strike rate (events won / competed); (W–L) win–loss record.

=== Singles ===
Tournament	2016	2017	2018	2019	2020	2021-2025	2026	SR	W–L	Win%
Grand Slam tournaments
Australian Open	A	A	A	A	A	A	A	0 / 0	0–0	–
French Open	Q1	A	Q2	Q2	A	A		0 / 0	0–0	–
Wimbledon	A	A	A	A	NH	A		0 / 0	0–0	–
US Open	A	A	A	A	A	A		0 / 0	0–0	–
Win–loss	0–0	0–0	0–0	0–0	0–0	0–0	0–0	0 / 0	0–0	–

== Challenger and Futures/World Tennis Tour finals ==
=== Singles: 36 (14 titles, 22 runner-ups) ===
Legend (singles) ATP Challenger Tour (0–0) ITF Futures/World Tennis Tour (14–22)	Titles by surface Hard (3–2) Clay (11–20)

Result	W–L	Date	Tournament	Tier	Surface	Opponent	Score
Loss	0–1	May 2015	Algeria F2, Algiers	Futures	Clay	(Spain) David Pérez Sanz	6–3, 1–6, 2–6
Loss	0–2	Jul 2016	Austria F3, Bad Waltersdorf	Futures	Clay	(Austria) Sebastian Ofner	4–6, 6–4, 3–6
Win	1–2	Jul 2016	Slovakia F1, Trnava	Futures	Clay	(Slovakia) Patrik Fabian	7–5, 7–6^{(7–2)}
Loss	1–3	Aug 2016	Austria F7, Pörtschach	Futures	Clay	(Czech Republic) Petr Michnev	6–4, 2–6, 4–6
Loss	1–4	Feb 2017	USA F8, Indian Harbour Beach	Futures	Clay	(Argentina) Andrea Collarini	5–7, 6–7^{(6–8)}
Loss	1–5	Mar 2017	Tunisia F11, Hammamet	Futures	Clay	(France) Alexis Musialek	1–6, 5–7
Win	2–5	Jul 2017	Belgium F4, Lasne	Futures	Clay	(Argentina) Juan Pablo Ficovich	6–3, 6–0
Loss	2–6	Jul 2017	France F16, Uriage	Futures	Clay	(France) Alexandre Müller	7–5, 6–7^{(1–7)}, 4–6
Win	3–6	Dec 2017	Hong Kong F5, Hong Kong	Futures	Hard	(Russia) Alexander Zhurbin	7–6^{(7–5)}, 6–7^{(3–7)}, 6–3
Loss	3–7	Sep 2018	France F16, Bagnères-de-Bigorre	Futures	Hard	(France) Albano Olivetti	6–7^{(2–7)}, 6–7^{(3–7)}
Loss	3–8	Sep 2018	France F21, Saint-Dizier	Futures	Hard (i)	(France) Matteo Martineau	7–6^{(7–5)}, 3–6, 4–6
Win	4–8	Dec 2018	Cameroon F2, Yaoundé	Futures	Hard	(Tunisia) Skander Mansouri	7–6^{(7–3)}, 6–4
Win	5–8	Feb 2019	M15 Monastir, Tunisia	World Tennis Tour	Hard	(Tunisia) Skander Mansouri	7–6^{(12–10)}, 3–6, 7–5
Win	6–8	Apr 2019	M15 Madrid, Spain	World Tennis Tour	Clay	(Switzerland) Johan Nikles	6–3, 6–2
Loss	6–9	May 2019	M15 Grasse, France	World Tennis Tour	Clay	(France) Maxime Hamou	2–6, 3–6
Loss	6–10	May 2019	M15 Vercelli, Italy	World Tennis Tour	Clay	(France) Maxime Chazal	6–2, 4–6, 5–7
Win	7–10	Aug 2019	M15 Tabarka, Tunisia	World Tennis Tour	Clay	(Italy) Daniele Capecchi	6–4, 6–3
Loss	7–11	Sep 2019	M25 Jounieh, Lebanon	World Tennis Tour	Clay	(Morocco) Adam Moundir	4–6, 3–6
Loss	7–12	Feb 2021	M25 Naples, Usa	World Tennis Tour	Clay	(United States) Christian Harrison	4–6, 2–6
Win	8–12	Mar 2021	M15 Rovinj, Croatia	World Tennis Tour	Clay	(United States) Martin Damm	3–6, 7–5, 6–0
Loss	8–13	Jan 2022	M15 Bagnoles de l'Orne, France	World Tennis Tour	Clay (i)	(France) Luca Van Assche	5–7, 3–6
Loss	8–14	Jan 2022	M15 Antalya, Turkey	World Tennis Tour	Clay	(Sweden) Dragoș Nicolae Mădăraș	6–7^{(5–7)}, 3–6
Loss	8–15	Aug 2022	M15 Kottingbrunn, Austria	World Tennis Tour	Clay	(Italy) Matteo Donati	6–7^{(3–7)}, 3–6
Loss	8–16	Oct 2022	M25 Gaziantep, Turkey	World Tennis Tour	Clay	(Romania) Nicholas David Ionel	2–6, 2–6
Loss	8–17	Jun 2023	M15 Tangier, Morocco	World Tennis Tour	Clay	(Italy) Filippo Moroni	3–6, 6–7^{(1–7)}
Loss	8–18	Jul 2023	M25 Pitești, Romania	World Tennis Tour	Clay	(Romania) Cezar Crețu	7–6^{(8–6)}, 2–6, 3–6
Win	9–18	Sep 2023	M25 Kigali, Rwanda	World Tennis Tour	Clay	(United States) Oliver Crawford	1–6, 6–4, 6–4
Loss	9–19	Dec 2023	M15 Antalya, Turkey	World Tennis Tour	Clay	Evgenii Tiurnev	6–7^{(4–7)}, 7–5, 1–6
Loss	9–20	Feb 2024	M25 Hammamet, Tunisia	World Tennis Tour	Clay	(Italy) Gian Marco Moroni	3–6, 0–6
Win	10–20	May 2024	M15 Orange Park, USA	World Tennis Tour	Clay	(Portugal) Duarte Vale	6–3, 7–5
Win	11–20	Sep 2024	M25 Kigali, Rwanda	World Tennis Tour	Clay	(France) Florent Bax	6–3, 7–6^{(7–3)}
Loss	11–21	Oct 2024	M25 Kigali, Rwanda	World Tennis Tour	Clay	(Austria) Maximilian Neuchrist	4–6, 5–7
Win	12–21	Oct 2024	M25 Kampala, Uganda	World Tennis Tour	Clay	(Austria) Maximilian Neuchrist	6–3, 6–4
Win	13–21	Oct 2025	M25 Kigali, Rwanda	World Tennis Tour	Clay	(Germany) Maik Steiner	6–0, 5–7, 7–6^{(7–2)}
Win	14–21	Apr 2026	M15 Orlando, USA	World Tennis Tour	Clay	(The Bahamas) Justin Roberts	6–4, 6–3
Loss	14–22	May 2026	M25 Deauville, France	World Tennis Tour	Clay	(France) Felix Balshaw	4–6, 1–6

=== Doubles: 39 (22–17) ===
Legend (doubles) ATP Challenger Tour (1–2) ITF Futures Tour/World Tennis Tour (21–15)	Titles by surface Hard (3–7) Clay (19–10)

Result	W–L	Date	Tournament	Tier	Surface	Partner	Opponents	Score
Loss	0–1	Oct 2015	Greece F8, Heraklion	Futures	Hard	(France) Alexandre Müller	(United Kingdom) Lloyd Glasspool (United Kingdom) Joshua Ward-Hibbert	w/o
Win	1–1	Jan 2016	France F1, Bagnoles-de-l'Orne	Futures	Clay (i)	(France) Alexandre Müller	(France) Benjamin Bonzi (France) Grégoire Jacq	2–6, 6–1, [10–6]
Win	2–1	Mar 2016	Israel F5, Ramat HaSharon	Futures	Hard	(France) Maxime Janvier	(Switzerland) Antoine Bellier (Hungary) Gábor Borsos	4–6, 6–4, [12–10]
Win	3–1	Sep 2016	Belgium F13, Arlon	Futures	Clay	(France) Antoine Hoang	(Belgium) Michael Geerts (Belgium) Jeroen Vanneste	6–3, 6–4
Win	4–1	Jan 2017	France F2, Bressuire	Futures	Hard (i)	(France) Hugo Nys	(Croatia) Ante Pavić (South Africa) Ruan Roelofse	6–4, 6–2
Win	5–1	Jul 2017	Belgium F4, Lasne	Futures	Clay	(France) Alexandre Müller	(France) Maxence Brovillé (France) Clément Tabur	6–1, 6–3
Win	6–1	Jul 2017	France F16, Uriage	Futures	Clay	(France) Alexandre Müller	(Switzerland) Antoine Bellier (France) Johan Sébastien Tatlot	6–3, 7–5
Loss	6–2	Dec 2017	Hong Kong F5, Hong Kong	Futures	Hard	(Japan) Takuto Niki	(United States) Evan King (United States) Michael Zhu	4–6, 2–6
Loss	6–3	May 2018	France F9, Grasse	Futures	Clay	(France) Alexandre Müller	(France) Hugo Gaston (France) Clément Tabur	2–6, 4–6
Win	7–3	Sep 2018	Belgium F10, Damme	Futures	Clay	(France) François-Arthur Vibert	(Germany) Valentin Günther (Germany) Mats Rosenkranz	6–4, 2–6, [11–9]
Win	8–3	Apr 2019	M15 Madrid, Spain	World Tennis Tour	Clay	(Switzerland) Johan Nikles	(Argentina) Tomás Lipovšek Puches (Brazil) Felipe Meligeni Alves	7–5, 5–7, [13–11]
Loss	8–4	Apr 2019	M15 Grasse, France	World Tennis Tour	Clay	(France) Amaury Delmas	(France) Mick Lescure (France) Christoph Negritu	2–6, 3–6
Win	9–4	Jun 2019	Blois, France	Challenger	Clay	(France) Alexandre Müller	(Peru) Sergio Galdós (Sweden) Andreas Siljeström	7–5, 6–7^{(5–7)}, [10–6]
Win	10–4	Sep 2019	M15 Tabarka, Tunisia	World Tennis Tour	Clay	(France) Clément Tabur	(Sweden) Ignacio Carou (Argentina) Franco Feitt	6–0, 6–1
Win	11–4	Sep 2019	M25 Jounieh, Lebanon	World Tennis Tour	Clay	(France) Jonathan Eysseric	(Sweden) Eric Ahren Moonga (Sweden) Jonathan Mridha	6–7^{(4–7)}, 7–6^{(7–2)}, [10–7]
Loss	11–5	Nov 2019	M25 Saint-Dizier, France	World Tennis Tour	Hard (i)	(France) Benjamin Bonzi	(France) Antoine Cornut-Chauvinc (France) Harold Mayot	4–6, 6–0, [8–10]
Loss	11–6	Jan 2020	M25 Nonthaburi, Thailand	World Tennis Tour	Hard	(South Korea) Chung Yun-seong	(Thailand) Sonchat Ratiwatana (Thailand) Wishaya Trongcharoenchaikul	3–6, 6–4, [10–5]
Win	12–6	Feb 2020	M25 Nonthaburi, Thailand	World Tennis Tour	Hard	(France) Benjamin Bonzi	(Germany) Sebastian Fanselow (Egypt) Karim-Mohamed Maamoun	6–2, 6–4
Loss	12–7	Mar 2020	M25 Potchefstroom, South Africa	World Tennis Tour	Hard	(Republic of Ireland) Simon Carr	(France) Benjamin Bonzi (France) Matteo Martineau	4–6, 2–6
Loss	12–8	Nov 2020	M15 Heraklion, Greece	World Tennis Tour	Hard	(France) Jonathan Eysseric	(Brazil) Mateus Alves (Argentina) Facundo Díaz Acosta	6–4, 3–6, [4-10]
Win	13–8	Apr 2021	M25 Angers, France	World Tennis Tour	Clay (i)	(France) Manuel Guinard	(France) Arthur Cazaux (France) Titouan Droguet	Walkover
Loss	13–9	May 2021	M25 Vic, Spain	World Tennis Tour	Clay	(Belgium) Michael Geerts	(Brazil) Mateus Alves (Brazil) Oscar José Gutierrez	6–7^{(3–7)}, 2–6
Loss	13–10	Jun 2021	Almaty, Kazakhstan	Challenger	Clay	(Spain) Adrián Menéndez Maceiras	(Ukraine) Vladyslav Manafov (Ukraine) Vitaliy Sachko	1–6, 4–6
Loss	13–11	Aug 2021	M25 Pitești, Romania	World Tennis Tour	Clay	(France) Clément Tabur	(France) Valentin Royer (Chinese Taipei) Tseng Chun-hsin	6–4, 2–6, [8–10]
Win	14–11	Jan 2022	M15+H Bagnoles-de-l'Orne, France	World Tennis Tour	Clay (i)	(France) Luca Van Assche	(France) Ronan Joncour (France) Mandresy Rakotomalala	6–3, 6–4
Win	15–11	Oct 2022	M25 Gaziantep, Turkey	World Tennis Tour	Clay	(Switzerland) Damien Venger	(Turkey) Sarp Ağabigün (Turkey) S Mert Özdemir	6–3, 6–2
Loss	15–12	Jan 2023	M25 Sheffield, UK	World Tennis Tour	Hard (i)	(Sweden) Simon Freund	(United Kingdom) Scott Duncan (United Kingdom) Marcus Willis	3–6, 4–6
Win	16–12	May 2023	M15 Pazardzhik, Bulgaria	World Tennis Tour	Clay	(Luxembourg) Alex Knaff	(Italy) Riccardo Balzerani; Artsiom Sinitsyn	6–0, 6–0
Win	17–12	Jun 2023	M15 Tanger, Morocco	World Tennis Tour	Clay	(France) Constantin Bittoun Kouzmine	(Italy) Luigi Sorrentino (Italy) Lorenzo Vatteroni	7–5, 6–3
Loss	17–13	Jul 2023	M25 Pitești, Romania	World Tennis Tour	Clay	(Romania) Stefan Palosi	(Romania) Radu Mihai Papoe (Romania) Dan Alexandru Tomescu	6–7^{(4–7)}, 3–6
Win	18–13	Sep 2023	M25 Kigali, Rwanda	World Tennis Tour	Clay	(Switzerland) Damien Wenger	(Ghana) Abraham Asaba (Burundi) Guy Orly Iradukunda	4–6, 7–6^{(7–5)}, [10–5]
Win	19–13	Sep 2023	M25 Zlatibor, Serbia	World Tennis Tour	Clay	(Switzerland) Damien Wenger	(Serbia) Viktor Jovic (France) Luka Pavlović	6–1, 4–6, [10–5]
Win	20–13	Oct 2023	M25 Telavi, Georgia	World Tennis Tour	Clay	(Switzerland) Damien Wenger	(Australia) Finn Reynolds (Israel) Roy Stepanov	6–0, 6–2
Loss	20–14	Dec 2023	M15 Antalya, Turkey	World Tennis Tour	Clay	(Turkey) Sarp Ağabigün	(United Kingdom) Jay Clarke (United Kingdom) James MacKinlay	6–7^{(5–7)}, 5–7
Win	21–14	Jan 2024	M25 Hammamet, Tunisia	World Tennis Tour	Clay	(Romania) Filip Cristian Jianu	(Germany) Adrian Oetzbach (Canada) Kelsey Stevenson	6–3, 4–6, [10–7]
Loss	21–15	Feb 2024	M25 Hammamet, Tunisia	World Tennis Tour	Clay	(Switzerland) Damien Wenger	(United Kingdom) Jay Clarke (Austria) Sandro Kopp	2–6, 5–7
Win	22–15	Apr 2024	M15 Orange Park, United States	World Tennis Tour	Clay	(Portugal) Duarte Vale	(United States) Sekou Bangoura (United States) Boris Kozlov	4–6, 7–5, [10–8]
Loss	22–16	Jun 2024	M25 Grasse, France	World Tennis Tour	Clay	(Switzerland) Damien Wenger	(Argentina) Mariano Kestelboim (Uruguay) Franco Roncadelli	3–6, 5–7
Loss	22–17	Jun 2024	Blois, France	Challenger	Hard (i)	(France) Arthur Géa	(Zimbabwe) Benjamin Lock (Zimbabwe) Courtney John Lock	1–6, 6–3, [4–10]
