= Başak Eraydın =

Turkish tennis player (born 1994)

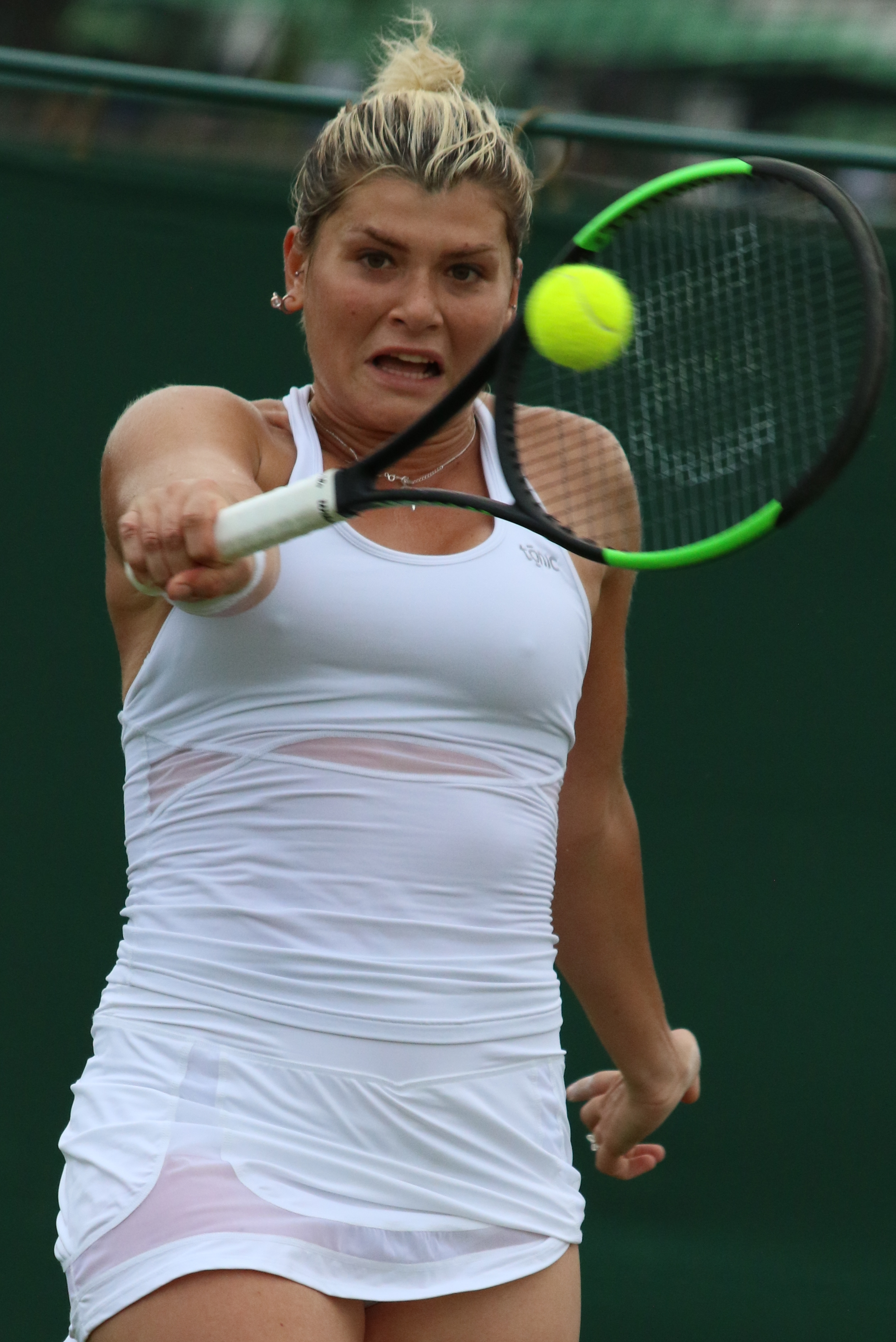
- Eraydin at the 2019 Wimbledon qualifying
- Country (sports): Turkey
- Born: 21 June 1994 (age 32) Ankara, Turkey
- Plays: Right (one-handed backhand)
- Prize money: $302,939

Singles
- Career record: 383–262
- Career titles: 15 ITF
- Highest ranking: No. 156 (2 April 2018)

Grand Slam singles results
- Australian Open: Q1 (2018, 2020)
- French Open: Q2 (2017)
- Wimbledon: Q2 (2019)
- US Open: Q2 (2017)

Doubles
- Career record: 240–151
- Career titles: 18 ITF
- Highest ranking: No. 151 (6 June 2016)

Team competitions
- Fed Cup: 5–7
Medal record
Representing Turkey
Women's Tennis
Mediterranean Games
Gold medal – first place	2018 Tarragona	Singles
Gold medal – first place	2018 Tarragona	Doubles
- Last updated on: 14 June 2026.

Başak Eraydın (born 21 June 1994) is a Turkish inactive tennis player.

She has won 15 singles and 18 doubles titles on the ITF Circuit. On 2 April 2018, she reached her best singles ranking of world No. 156. On 6 June 2016, she peaked at No. 151 in the doubles rankings. Playing with İpek Öz, Eraydın won the gold medal in women's doubles at the 2018 Mediterranean Games.

Playing for the Turkey Fed Cup team, Eraydın has an overall win–loss record of 5–7 (singles 3–4).

== Career ==
In 2012, Eraydın won seven singles and five doubles titles on the ITF Circuit.

In April 2017, she won the inaugural 2017 Lale Cup in Istanbul, a $60k event, by defeating Petra Krejsová in straight sets in the final. A week later, Eraydın advanced to her first ever WTA Tour quarterfinal at the 2017 İstanbul Cup.

Partnering İpek Öz, Eraydın won the gold medal in the women's doubles at the 2018 Mediterranean Games, defeating Bosnian pair Nefisa Berberović and Dea Herdželaš in the final which went to a deciding champions tiebreak.

== ITF Circuit finals ==
=== Singles: 27 (15 titles, 12 runner-ups) ===
Legend
$60,000 tournaments
$25,000 tournaments
$10/15,000 tournaments

Result	W–L	Date	Tournament	Tier	Surface	Opponent	Score
Loss	0–1	Sep 2010	ITF Thessaloniki, Greece	10,000	Clay	(Russia) Anastasia Mukhametova	6–1, 1–6, 3–6
Win	1–1	May 2012	ITF Istanbul, Turkey	10,000	Hard	(Spain) Nuria Párrizas Díaz	6–3, 6–1
Win	2–1	May 2012	ITF Izmir, Turkey	10,000	Hard	(Sweden) Beatrice Cedermark	6–0, 6–1
Win	3–1	Jun 2012	ITF Ağrı, Turkey	10,000	Carpet	(Austria) Jeannine Prentner	6–3, 6–3
Win	4–1	Jul 2012	ITF Istanbul, Turkey	10,000	Hard	(Argentina) Tatiana Búa	5–7, 6–4, 6–1
Win	5–1	Jul 2012	ITF Istanbul, Turkey	10,000	Hard	(Russia) Yuliya Kalabina	6–3, 6–0
Win	6–1	Oct 2012	ITF Monastir, Tunisia	10,000	Hard	(Russia) Marina Shamayko	6–2, 7–6^{(5)}
Win	7–1	Nov 2012	ITF Heraklion, Greece	10,000	Carpet	(Germany) Lena-Marie Hofmann	6–4, 6–0
Loss	7–2	Dec 2012	Pune Championships, India	25,000	Hard	(Slovenia) Tadeja Majerič	2–6, 4–6
Loss	7–3	May 2013	ITF Sharm El Sheikh, Egypt	10,000	Hard	(Turkey) Melis Sezer	2–6, 6–4, 3–6
Win	8–3	Jun 2013	ITF Istanbul, Turkey	10,000	Hard	(Belarus) Darya Lebesheva	6–3, 6–4
Loss	8–4	Jul 2013	ITF Istanbul, Turkey	10,000	Hard	(Turkey) Melis Sezer	2–6, 7–6^{(3)}, 2–6
Loss	8–5	Jul 2013	ITF Izmir, Turkey	10,000	Hard	(Estonia) Anett Kontaveit	6–3, 6–7^{(4)}, 0–6
Loss	8–6	Jun 2014	ITF Adana, Turkey	10,000	Hard	(Turkey) İpek Soylu	6–4, 1–6, 2–6
Win	9–6	Jun 2015	ITF Balıkesir, Turkey	10,000	Hard	(Turkey) Melis Sezer	6–3, 5–7, 6–3
Win	10–6	Jul 2015	ITF Sakarya, Turkey	10,000	Hard	(Italy) Valeria Prosperi	6–3, 6–1
Loss	10–7	Aug 2015	ITF Moscow, Russia	25,000	Clay	(Russia) Viktoria Kamenskaya	2–6, 2–6
Loss	10–8	Nov 2015	ITF Minsk, Belarus	25,000	Hard (i)	(Russia) Irina Khromacheva	2–6, 5–7
Win	11–8	Jan 2016	ITF Antalya, Turkey	10,000	Clay	(Armenia) Ani Amiraghyan	3–6, 6–2, 6–4
Loss	11–9	Feb 2017	ITF Antalya, Turkey	15,000	Clay	(Serbia) Dejana Radanović	4–6, 6–7^{(1)}
Win	12–9	Apr 2017	Lale Cup, Turkey	60,000	Hard	(Czech Republic) Petra Krejsová	6–3, 6–0
Loss	12–10	Mar 2018	ITF Antalya, Turkey	15,000	Clay	(Russia) Amina Anshba	0–6, 0–6
Win	13–10	Mar 2018	ITF Pula, Italy	25,000	Clay	(Bulgaria) Elitsa Kostova	6–4, 6–1
Loss	13–11	Aug 2018	ITF El Espinar, Spain	25,000	Hard	(Russia) Liudmila Samsonova	2–6, 0–6
Win	14–11	Aug 2018	ITF Las Palmas, Spain	25,000	Clay	(Spain) Guiomar Maristany	6–4, 6–3
Win	15–11	Aug 2018	ITF Las Palmas, Spain	25,000	Clay	(France) Chloé Paquet	6–2, 6–1
Loss	15–12	Oct 2018	ITF Seville, Spain	25,000	Clay	(Hungary) Anna Bondár	2–6, 7–5, 2–6

=== Doubles: 41 (18 titles, 23 runner-ups) ===
Legend
$100,000 tournaments
$50,000 tournaments
$25,000 tournaments
$10/15,000 tournaments

Result	W–L	Date	Tournament	Tier	Surface	Partner	Opponents	Score
Win	1–0	Aug 2010	ITF Istanbul, Turkey	10,000	Hard	(Bulgaria) Isabella Shinikova	(Oman) Fatma Al-Nabhani (Portugal) Magali de Lattre	3–6, 6–3, [10–4]
Loss	1–1	Sep 2010	ITF Mytilene, Greece	10,000	Hard	(Russia) Diana Isaeva	(Israel) Chen Astrogo (Israel) Keren Shlomo	1–6, 3–6
Loss	1–2	Oct 2010	ITF Antalya, Turkey	10,000	Clay	(Italy) Camilla Rosatello	(Slovakia) Chantal Škamlová (Slovakia) Nikola Vajdová	1–6, 3–6
Win	2–2	May 2011	ITF Gaziantep, Turkey	10,000	Hard	(Armenia) Ani Amiraghyan	(Australia) Daniella Dominikovic (Turkey) Melis Sezer	6–2, 6–3
Loss	2–3	Dec 2011	ITF Antalya, Turkey	10,000	Clay	(Belarus) Ilona Kremen	(Italy) Gioia Barbieri (Italy) Giulia Pasini	6–7^{(6)}, 6–4, [5–10]
Win	3–3	May 2012	ITF Istanbul, Turkey	10,000	Hard	(Turkey) Melis Sezer	(Oman) Fatma Al-Nabhani (Germany) Anna Zaja	6–2, 3–6, [10–7]
Win	4–3	May 2012	ITF Istanbul, Turkey	10,000	Clay	(Turkey) İpek Soylu	(China) Liu Chang (China) Zhang Nannan	3–6, 6–2, [10–5]
Win	5–3	Jul 2012	ITF Istanbul, Turkey	10,000	Hard	(Turkey) Melis Sezer	(Canada) Élisabeth Fournier (Canada) Brittany Wowchuk	6–1, 6–4
Win	6–3	Nov 2012	ITF Heraklion, Greece	10,000	Carpet	(Australia) Abbie Myers	(Bulgaria) Borislava Botusharova (Bulgaria) Vivian Zlatanova	6–0, 6–1
Win	7–3	Nov 2012	ITF Heraklion, Greece	10,000	Carpet	(Australia) Abbie Myers	(Serbia) Tamara Čurović (Russia) Yana Sizikova	6–4, 6–4
Loss	7–4	Mar 2013	ITF Antalya, Turkey	10,000	Hard	(Australia) Abbie Myers	(Georgia (country)) Oksana Kalashnikova (Kyrgyzstan) Ksenia Palkina	4–6, 6–4, [8–10]
Loss	7–5	Apr 2013	Lale Cup, Turkey	50,000	Hard	(Bulgaria) Aleksandrina Naydenova	(Russia) Ekaterina Bychkova (Ukraine) Nadiia Kichenok	6–3, 2–6, [5–10]
Loss	7–6	May 2013	ITF Sharm El Sheikh, Egypt	10,000	Hard	(Turkey) Melis Sezer	(United Kingdom) Anna Fitzpatrick (Montenegro) Ana Veselinović	6–2, 4–6, [3–10]
Loss	7–7	Jun 2013	ITF Istanbul, Turkey	10,000	Hard	(Bosnia and Herzegovina) Jasmina Tinjić	(Turkey) Melis Sezer (Turkey) İpek Soylu	4–6, ret.
Win	8–7	Jul 2013	ITF Izmir, Turkey	10,000	Hard	(Slovakia) Zuzana Zlochová	(Turkey) Hülya Esen (Turkey) Lütfiye Esen	6–1, 6–3
Loss	8–8	Aug 2013	Tatarstan Open, Russia	50,000	Hard	(Ukraine) Veronika Kapshay	(Ukraine) Valentyna Ivakhnenko (Ukraine) Kateryna Kozlova	4–6, 1–6
Loss	8–9	Oct 2013	ITF Herzliya, Israel	25,000	Hard	(Turkey) Melis Sezer	(Ukraine) Yuliya Beygelzimer (Ukraine) Anastasiya Vasylyeva	3–6, 3–6
Win	9–9	Jun 2014	ITF Adana, Turkey	10,000	Hard	(Turkey) İpek Soylu	(Ukraine) Alona Fomina (Russia) Ekaterina Tsiklauri	6–3, 6–1
Win	10–9	Jul 2014	ITF Istanbul, Turkey	10,000	Hard	(Turkey) Melis Sezer	(Russia) Maria Mokh (Sweden) Anette Munozova	2–6, 6–0, [10–7]
Loss	10–10	Feb 2015	ITF Antalya, Turkey	10,000	Clay	(Italy) Verena Meliss	(Bosnia and Herzegovina) Anita Husarić (Belgium) Kimberley Zimmermann	0–6, 3–6
Loss	10–11	May 2015	ITF Monzón, Spain	10,000	Hard	(United Kingdom) Francesca Stephenson	(Spain) Georgina García Pérez (Spain) Olga Parres Azcoitia	4–6, 2–6
Loss	10–12	Jul 2015	ITF Sakarya, Turkey	10,000	Hard	(Russia) Margarita Lazareva	(Serbia) Tamara Čurović (Russia) Ekaterina Yashina	6–4, 1–6, [6–10]
Loss	10–13	Aug 2015	President's Cup, Kazakhstan	25,000	Hard	(Kyrgyzstan) Ksenia Palkina	(Russia) Natela Dzalamidze (Russia) Alena Tarasova	0–6, 1–6
Win	11–13	Sep 2015	Open de Biarritz, France	100,000	Clay	(Belarus) Lidziya Marozava	(Hungary) Réka Luca Jani (Liechtenstein) Stephanie Vogt	6–4, 6–4
Win	12–13	Oct 2015	ITF Istanbul, Turkey	25,000	Hard (i)	(Russia) Polina Leykina	(Romania) Cristina Dinu (Croatia) Jana Fett	7–5, 6–7^{(2)}, [10–5]
Win	13–13	Nov 2015	ITF Minsk, Belarus	25,000	Hard (i)	(Russia) Veronika Kudermetova	(Russia) Anastasia Frolova (Russia) Ekaterina Yashina	6–3, 6–1
Loss	13–14	May 2016	Grado Tennis Cup, Italy	25,000	Clay	(Italy) Alice Matteucci	(Argentina) Catalina Pella (Chile) Daniela Seguel	2–6, 6–7^{(8)}
Loss	13–15	Aug 2016	ITF Koksijde, Belgium	25,000	Clay	(Belarus) Ilona Kremen	(Belgium) Steffi Distelmans (Netherlands) Demi Schuurs	1–6, 4–6
Loss	13–16	Aug 2016	ITF Kharkiv, Ukraine	25,000	Clay	(Belarus) Ilona Kremen	(Russia) Valentyna Ivakhnenko (Russia) Anastasiya Komardina	1–6, 3–6
Win	14–16	Feb 2017	ITF Antalya, Turkey	15,000	Clay	(Russia) Valentyna Ivakhnenko	(Switzerland) Karin Kennel (Slovenia) Nastja Kolar	7–6^{(6)}, 6–2
Win	15–16	Feb 2017	ITF Antalya, Turkey	15,000	Clay	(Switzerland) Karin Kennel	(Romania) Cristina Dinu (Romania) Cristina Ene	6–3, 2–6, [10–5]
Loss	15–17	Feb 2017	ITF Antalya, Turkey	15,000	Clay	(Switzerland) Karin Kennel	(Turkey) Ayla Aksu (Georgia (country)) Ekaterine Gorgodze	3–6, 1–6
Loss	15–18	Aug 2018	ITF El Espinar, Spain	25,000	Hard	(Serbia) Tamara Čurovic	(Spain) Marina Bassols Ribera (Spain) Olga Parres Azcoitia	5–7, 4–6
Loss	15–19	Aug 2018	ITF Las Palmas, Spain	25,000	Clay	(Turkey) İpek Soylu	(Russia) Yana Sizikova (Norway) Ulrikke Eikeri	2–6, 4–6
Loss	15–20	Oct 2018	ITF Seville, Spain	25,000	Clay	(Russia) Anastasiya Komardina	(Venezuela) Andrea Gamiz (Argentina) Paula Ormaechea	5–7, 6–7^{(5)}
Win	16–20	Sep 2019	ITF Arad, Romania	W25	Clay	(Romania) Andreea Mitu	(Romania) Oana Gavrilă (Romania) Andreea Roșca	6–0, 6–1
Win	17–20	Dec 2019	ITF Antalya, Turkey	W15	Hard	(Romania) Georgia Crăciun	(Turkey) Ayla Aksu (Turkey) Gizem Melisa Ateş	6–1, 6–2
Win	18–20	Jun 2021	ITF Antalya, Turkey	W15	Clay	(Hungary) Amarissa Tóth	(United States) Jessie Aney (United States) Christina Rosca	4–6, 6–1, [10–7]
Loss	18–21	Mar 2023	ITF Antalya, Turkey	W15	Clay	(Japan) Yukina Saigo	(Czech Republic) Denisa Hindová (Slovenia) Nika Radišić	6–7^{(6)}, 3–6
Loss	18–22	Apr 2023	ITF Antalya, Turkey	W15	Clay	(Germany) Sonja Zhiyenbayeva	(Germany) Katharina Hering (Germany) Natalia Siedliska	3–6, 2–6
Loss	18–23	May 2023	ITF Antalya, Turkey	W15	Clay	(Turkey) Leyla Elmas	Alevtina Ibragimova; Alexandra Shubladze	4–6, 6–1, [3–10]

== Other finals ==
=== Singles ===
Medal	Date	Championship	Location	Opponent	Score
Gold	June 2018	Mediterranean Games	Tarragona, Spain	(France) Fiona Ferro	6–7, 6–3, 6–3

=== Doubles ===
Medal	Date	Championship	Location	Partner	Opponents	Score
Gold	June 2018	Mediterranean Games	Tarragona, Spain	(Turkey) İpek Öz	(Bosnia and Herzegovina) Nefisa Berberović (Bosnia and Herzegovina) Dea Herdželaš	0–6, 6–3, [12–10]
