= Sarp Ağabigün =

Turkish tennis player (born 1997)

- Country (sports): Turkey
- Born: 12 June 1997 (age 29) Istanbul, Turkey
- Height: 1.78 m (5 ft 10 in)
- Plays: Right-handed (two-handed backhand)
- Coach: Dominik Hrbatý
- Prize money: $75,503

Singles
- Career record: 1–0 (at ATP Tour level, Grand Slam level, and in Davis Cup)
- Career titles: 0 ITF
- Highest ranking: No. 831 (16 October 2017)
- Current ranking: No. 994 (10 September 2018)

Doubles
- Career record: 0–1 (at ATP Tour level, Grand Slam level, and in Davis Cup)
- Career titles: 6 ITF
- Highest ranking: No. 322 (27 June 2016)
- Current ranking: No. 711 (10 September 2018)

Team competitions
- Davis Cup: 1–0
- Sports career
Medal record
Men's tennis
Representing Turkey
Mediterranean Games
Bronze medal – third place	2018 Tarragona	Doubles
- Last updated on: 12 September 2018.

Sarp Ağabigün (born 12 June 1997) is a Turkish tennis player.

Ağabigün has a career high ATP singles ranking of 831 achieved on 16 October 2017. He also has a career high ATP doubles ranking of 322 achieved on 27 June 2016.

Ağabigün made his ATP main draw debut at the 2017 Antalya Open in the doubles draw partnering Altuğ Çelikbilek. He has represented Turkey at the Davis Cup, where he has a win–loss record of 1–0.

== Career titles ==
=== Doubles ===
Legend
ATP Challenger Tour (0)
ITF Futures (7)

Date	Tournament	Surface	Partner	Opponents	Score
2015 August	Turkey F35, Antalya	Hard	(Turkey) Altuğ Çelikbilek	(Czech Republic) Michal Konečný (Netherlands) Miliaan Niesten	6–1, 7–6^{(7–5)}
2015 October	Turkey F41, Antalya	Hard	(India) Ramkumar Ramanathan	(Russia) Kirill Dmitriev (Switzerland) Luca Margaroli	6–4, 6–4
2016 February	Turkey 8, Antalya	Hard	(Czech Republic) Marek Michalička	(Turkey) Tuna Altuna (Turkey) Altuğ Çelikbilek	4–6, 6–3, [11–9]
2016 May	Turkey F20, Antalya	Hard	(Turkey) Altuğ Çelikbilek	(Ukraine) Filipp Kekercheni (Germany) Christoph Negritu	7–5, 6–3
2017 May	Turkey F17, Antalya	Clay	(Ukraine) Volodymyr Uzhylovskyi	(United Kingdom) Joel Cannell (Argentina) Manuel Peña López	7–6^{(7–1)}, 6–2
2017 July	Turkey F26, Istanbul	Clay	(Ukraine) Marat Deviatiarov	(Russia) Alexander Igoshin (Bulgaria) Vasko Mladenov	6–2, 7–6^{(7–5)}
2022 March	M25 Antalya, Turkey	Clay	(Ukraine) Oleksii Krutykh	(Argentina) Román Andrés Burruchaga (Italy) Alexander Weis	6–4, 7–6^{(7–3)}
