= İpek Öz =

Turkish tennis player (born 1999)

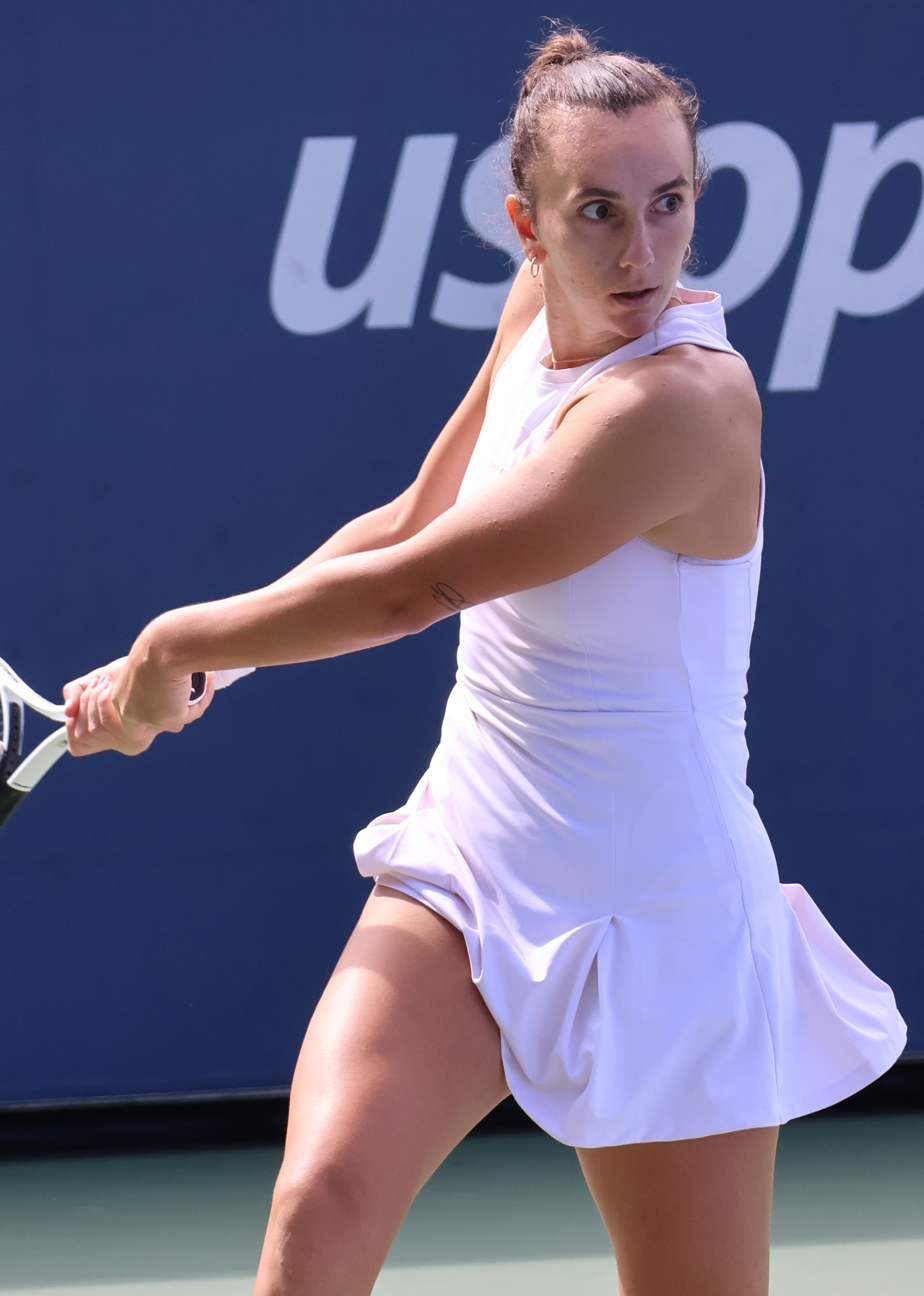
- Öz at the 2023 US Open
- Country (sports): Turkey
- Residence: Istanbul, Turkiye
- Born: 8 July 1999 (age 27) Antalya, Turkiye
- Height: 1.78 m (5 ft 10 in)
- Plays: Left-handed (two-handed backhand)
- Prize money: $458,234

Singles
- Career record: 318–262
- Career titles: 6 ITF
- Highest ranking: No. 163 (18 July 2022)
- Current ranking: No. 269 (26 October 2026)

Grand Slam singles results
- Australian Open: Q1 (2023)
- French Open: Q2 (2022)
- Wimbledon: Q2 (2024)
- US Open: Q1 (2022, 2023)

Doubles
- Career record: 152–108
- Career titles: 9 ITF
- Highest ranking: No. 290 (16 March 2026)
- Current ranking: No. 356 (26 October 2026)

Team competitions
- Fed Cup: 10–9
Medal record
Representing Turkey
Mediterranean Games
Gold medal – first place	2018 Tarragona	Doubles
- Last updated on: 30 October 2026.

İpek Öz (born 8 July 1999) is a Turkish professional tennis player. She has a career-high WTA singles ranking of No. 163, achieved on 18 July 2022, and a best doubles ranking of world No. 290, achieved 16 March 2026.

At the 2018 Mediterranean Games in Tarragona, Spain, Öz won the gold medal for Turkey in the doubles event, alongside teammate Başak Eraydın.

== Career ==
=== 2017–2021 ===
Öz won her first professional singles title in the ITF Circuit tournament held at Manavgat, Turkey in 2017, defeating Ilona Georgiana Ghioroaie from Romania in the final.

She made her WTA Tour main-draw debut at the 2018 İstanbul Cup, where she received a wildcard into the singles draw, and in the doubles main draw, partnering Melis Sezer.

Partnering Başak Eraydın, she won the gold medal in women's doubles at the 2018 Mediterranean Games, defeating Bosnian pair Nefisa Berberović and Dea Herdželaš in the final which went to a deciding champions tiebreak.

=== 2022 ===
Entering as a wildcard player at the Qatar Ladies Open, Öz lost in the first round to Madison Brengle. Having qualified for the Copa Colsanitas, she reached the second round with a win over Daniela Seguel, but lost her next match to defending champion and top seed Camila Osorio.

At the Swedish Open, Öz defeated eighth seed Kamilla Rakhimova in the first round. She went out in round two against Viktoriya Tomova.

Öz reached her first WTA 125 semifinal at the Montevideo Open, defeating Rosa Vicens Mas and Darya Astakhova, before losing in the last four to Léolia Jeanjean.

=== 2023–2024 ===
Öz received wildcard entries into the 2023 Qatar Ladies Open and the Dubai Championships, but lost in the first round to Victoria Azarenka and Marta Kostyuk respectively.

Ranked No. 210, she entered the main draw as lucky loser at the Transylvania Open in Cluj Napoca, although she again went out in the opening round, this time to Miriam Bulgaru.

At the 2023 Florianópolis Open, Öz defeated sixth seed Anna Bondár to reach the second round, where she lost to eventual champion Ajla Tomljanović. The following week she made it through to round two at the Argentina Open thanks to a win over Valentini Grammatikopoulou, but was then defeated by eighth seed María Lourdes Carlé.

Öz reached the second round at the Montevideo Open, defeating Jamie Loeb, before losing to fourth seed Julia Riera in three sets.

At the 2024 Ljubljana Open, she overcame wildcard entrant Živa Falkner in the first round, but then lost her next match to second seed Nuria Parrizas Diaz.

== Grand Slam performance timeline ==
Key
W	F	SF	QF	#R	RR	Q#	P#	DNQ	A	Z#	PO	G	S	B	NMS	NTI	P	NH

(W) winner; (F) finalist; (SF) semifinalist; (QF) quarterfinalist; (#R) rounds 4, 3, 2, 1; (RR) round-robin stage; (Q#) qualification round; (P#) preliminary round; (DNQ) did not qualify; (A) absent; (Z#) Davis/Fed Cup Zonal Group (with number indication) or (PO) play-off; (G) gold, (S) silver or (B) bronze Olympic/Paralympic medal; (NMS) not a Masters tournament; (NTI) not a Tier I tournament; (P) postponed; (NH) not held; (SR) strike rate (events won / competed); (W–L) win–loss record.
To avoid confusion and double counting, these charts are updated at the conclusion of a tournament or when the player's participation has ended.

=== Singles ===
Tournament	2022	2023	2024	W–L
Australian Open	A	A	Q1	0–0
French Open	Q2	A	Q1	0–0
Wimbledon	Q1	A	Q2	0–0
US Open	Q1	Q1	A	0–0
Win–loss	0–0	0–0	0–0	0–0

== ITF Circuit finals ==
=== Singles: 18 (6 titles, 12 runner-ups) ===
Legend
W60 tournaments
W40 tournaments
W25 tournaments
W15 tournaments

Result	W–L	Date	Tournament	Tier	Surface	Opponent	Score
Win	1–0	Oct 2017	ITF Antalya, Turkey	W15	Clay	(Romania) Ilona Georgiana Ghioroaie	6–3, 6–2
Finalist (Note: The match was suspended at 0–2 and never finished because of rain.)	NP	Jan 2019	ITF Antalya, Turkey	W15	Clay	(Kazakhstan) Zhibek Kulambayeva	0–2* canc.
Loss	1–1	Aug 2019	ITF Oldenzaal, Netherlands	W15	Clay	(Netherlands) Cindy Burger	6–2, 1–6, 1–6
Win	2–1	Nov 2019	ITF Antalya, Turkey	W15	Clay	(Czech Republic) Johana Marková	6–1, 6–3
Win	3–1	Nov 2020	ITF Antalya, Turkey	W15	Clay	(Romania) Andreea Roșca	6–1, 6–1
Loss	3–2	Jan 2021	ITF Antalya, Turkey	W15	Clay	(Turkey) Berfu Cengiz	6–3, 2–6, 4–6
Loss	3–3	Jun 2021	ITF Wrocław, Poland	W25	Clay	(France) Chloé Paquet	6–4, 3–6, 3–6
Loss	3–4	Sep 2021	Collonge-Bellerive Open, Switzerland	W60	Clay	(Brazil) Beatriz Haddad Maia	7–5, 1–6, 4–6
Loss	3–5	Oct 2021	ITF Lisbon, Portugal	W25	Clay	(Spain) Irene Burillo	4–6, 0–6
Loss	3–6	Jan 2022	ITF Manacor, Spain	W25	Hard	(Spain) Yvonne Cavallé Reimers	2–6, 2–6
Win	4–6	May 2022	ITF Båstad, Sweden	W25	Clay	Irina Khromacheva	6–3, 6–1
Loss	4–7	Jun 2022	Brașov Open, Romania	W60	Clay	(Australia) Jaimee Fourlis	6–7^{(0)}, 2–6
Loss	4–8	Oct 2022	ITF Seville, Spain	W25	Clay	(Cyprus) Raluca Șerban	3–6, 0–6
Loss	4–9	May 2023	ITF Båstad, Sweden	W25	Clay	(Argentina) María Lourdes Carlé	4–6, 3–6
Loss	4–10	Jun 2023	Open de Biarritz, France	W60	Clay	(France) Fiona Ferro	5–7, 3–6
Win	5–10	Jun 2023	ITF Ystad, Sweden	W40	Clay	(Australia) Astra Sharma	6–1, 6–3
Loss	5–11	Apr 2024	Split Open, Croatia	W60	Clay	(Croatia) Jana Fett	0–6, 4–6
Loss	5–12	Oct 2026	ITF Heraklion, Greece	W50	Clay	(Czech Republic) Alisa Oktiabreva	5–7, 1–6
Win	6–12	Oct 2026	ITF Stara Zagora, Bulgaria	W50	Clay	(Czech Republic) Alena Kovačková	6–2, 7–5

=== Doubles: 25 (10 titles, 15 runner-ups) ===
Legend
W50 tournaments
W25 tournaments
W15 tournaments

Result	W–L	Date	Tournament	Tier	Surface	Partner	Opponents	Score
Loss	0–1	Jul 2017	ITF Istanbul, Turkey	W15	Clay	(Croatia) Ena Kajević	(United States) Sanaz Marand (Turkey) Melis Sezer	2–6, 6–7^{(1)}
Loss	0–2	Jul 2017	ITF Istanbul, Turkey	W15	Hard	(Bulgaria) Petia Arshinkova	(Georgia (country)) Ekaterine Gorgodze (Georgia (country)) Mariam Bolkvadze	1–6, 3–6
Win	1–2	Aug 2017	ITF Istanbul, Turkey	W15	Hard	(Turkey) Berfu Cengiz	(Russia) Vasilisa Aponasenko (Croatia) Tea Faber	6–4, 6–1
Win	2–2	Oct 2017	ITF Antalya, Turkey	W15	Clay	(Uzbekistan) Albina Khabibulina	(Hungary) Réka Luca Jani (Ukraine) Sofiya Kovalets	7–5, 1–6, [11–9]
Loss	2–3	Oct 2017	ITF Istanbul, Turkey	W25	Hard (i)	(Russia) Ekaterina Yashina	(Czech Republic) Petra Krejsová (Czech Republic) Jesika Malečková	4–6, 3–6
Loss	2–4	Nov 2017	ITF Antalya, Turkey	W15	Clay	(Czech Republic) Gabriela Pantůčková	(Moldova) Vitalia Stamat (Russia) Ekaterina Vishnevskaya	3–6, 5–7
Win	3–4	Nov 2017	ITF Antalya, Turkey	W15	Clay	(Turkey) Melis Sezer	(Russia) Polina Bakhmutkina (Czech Republic) Magdaléna Pantůčková	3–6, 7–5, [14–12]
Loss	3–5	Jan 2018	ITF Antalya, Turkey	W15	Clay	(Kyrgyzstan) Ksenia Palkina	(Georgia (country)) Sofia Shapatava (Ukraine) Anastasiya Vasylyeva	7–5, 0–6, [11–13]
Loss	3–6	Jan 2018	ITF Antalya, Turkey	W15	Clay	(Russia) Ekaterina Vishnevskaya	(Romania) Oana Gavrilă (Romania) Andreea Amalia Roșca	4–6, 2–6
Win	4–6	Jun 2018	ITF Minsk, Belarus	W15	Clay	(Turkey) Melis Sezer	(Belarus) Anna Kubareva (Czech Republic) Anna Sisková	6–1, 0–6, [10–8]
Win	5–6	Jun 2018	ITF Minsk, Belarus	W15	Clay	(Turkey) Melis Sezer	(Belgium) Margaux Bovy (Russia) Angelina Zhuravleva	6–2, 4–6, [10–5]
Loss	5–7	Jul 2018	Telavi Open, Georgia	W15	Clay	(Turkey) Melis Sezer	(Russia) Nadezda Gorbachkova (Moldova) Julia Helbet	0–1 ret.
Loss	5–8	Sep 2018	ITF Varna, Bulgaria	W15	Clay	(Turkey) Melis Sezer	(Romania) Gabriela Talabă (Venezuela) Aymet Uzcátegui	6–3, 5–7, [5–10]
Loss	5–9	Nov 2018	ITF Antalya, Turkey	W15	Clay	(Turkey) Melis Sezer	(Romania) Ioana Gașpar (Romania) Gabriela Tatarus	7–6^{(3)}, 5–7, [4–10]
Win	6–9	Jun 2019	ITF Budapest, Hungary	W15	Clay	(Turkey) Melis Sezer	(Czech Republic) Kristýna Hrabalová (Slovakia) Laura Svatíková	6–3, 4–6, [15–13]
Win	7–9	Jul 2019	ITF Prokuplje, Serbia	W15	Clay	(Turkey) Melis Sezer	(Bosnia and Herzegovina) Nefisa Berberović (Slovenia) Veronika Erjavec	7–5, 7–5
Loss	7–10	Nov 2019	ITF Antalya, Turkey	W15	Clay	(Ukraine) Viktoriya Petrenko	(Czech Republic) Johana Marková (Slovenia) Nika Radišić	4–6, 5–7
Loss	7–11	Mar 2020	ITF Antalya, Turkey	W25	Clay	(Turkey) Melis Sezer	(Hungary) Réka Luca Jani (Egypt) Mayar Sherif	7–6^{(8)}, 1–6, [3–10]
Win	8–11	Jan 2021	ITF Antalya, Turkey	W15	Clay	(Turkey) Cemre Anıl	(Italy) Federica Arcidiacono (Italy) Aurora Zantedeschi	6–2, 3–6, [10–6]
Loss	8–12	Apr 2021	ITF Dubai, UAE	W25	Hard	(Turkey) Berfu Cengiz	(United States) Emina Bektas (United Kingdom) Tara Moore	5–7, 6–4, [7–10]
Loss	8–13	Jun 2021	ITF Wrocław, Poland	W25	Clay	(Italy) Nuria Brancaccio	(Poland) Anna Hertel (Poland) Martyna Kubka	6–7^{(2)}, 6–3, [7–10]
Win	9–13	Oct 2022	ITF Seville, Spain	W25	Clay	(Slovenia) Nika Radišić	(Ukraine) Maryna Kolb (Ukraine) Nadiia Kolb	7–5, 7–6^{(3)}
Loss	9–14	Nov 2024	Trnava Indoor, Slovakia	W50	Hard (i)	(Croatia) Tara Würth	(Czech Republic) Dominika Šalková (Czech Republic) Julie Štruplová	4–6, 4–6
Loss	9–15	Aug 2025	ITF Oldenzaal, Netherlands	W50	Clay	(Germany) Noma Noha Akugue	(Netherlands) Joy de Zeeuw (Netherlands) Sarah van Emst	7–6^{(3)}, 7–6^{(4)}
Win	10–15	Oct 2026	ITF Morelia, Mexico	W50	Hard	Anastasia Tikhonova	(United States) Jo-yee Chan (United States) Kennedy Gibbs	7–6^{(2)}, 6–3

== Other finals ==
=== Doubles ===
Outcome	Date	Tournament	Location	Partner	Opponents	Score
Gold	June 2018	2018 Mediterranean Games	Tarragona, Spain	(Turkey) Başak Eraydın	(Bosnia and Herzegovina) Nefisa Berberović (Bosnia and Herzegovina) Dea Herdželaš	0–6, 6–3, [12–10]
