= Nefisa Berberović =

Bosnian tennis player (born 1999)

- Country (sports): Bosnia and Herzegovina
- Born: 3 July 1999 (age 26) Tuzla, Bosnia & Herzegovina
- Plays: Right (two-handed backhand)
- Prize money: US$ 104,424

Singles
- Career record: 223–139
- Career titles: 7 ITF
- Highest ranking: No. 221 (17 October 2022)

Doubles
- Career record: 91–73
- Career titles: 11 ITF
- Highest ranking: No. 454 (27 February 2023)

Team competitions
- Fed Cup: 13–5
Medal record
Women's tennis
Representing Bosnia and Herzegovina
Mediterranean Games
Silver medal – second place	2018 Tarragona	Women's doubles
- Last updated on: 14 June 2026.

Nefisa Berberović (born 3 July 1999) is a Bosnian inactive tennis player.

Berberović has career-high rankings of 221 in singles and 454 in doubles. Alongside Dea Herdželaš, she won the silver medal in the women's doubles at the 2018 Mediterranean Games.

Playing for the Bosnia and Herzegovina Fed Cup team, she has a win–loss record of 13–5, as of July 2024.

== Career ==
Partnering Dea Herdželaš, she won the silver medal in the women's doubles at the 2018 Mediterranean Games, losing to Turkish pair Başak Eraydın and İpek Öz in the final which went to a deciding champions tiebreak.

Berberović made her WTA Tour debut at the 2022 Internationaux de Strasbourg as a lucky loser becoming the first Bosnian in a WTA main draw since 2013. She stunned former top-10 player Sloane Stephens in the first round, the first Bosnian player to win a match since Mervana Jugic-Salkic at Hyderabad 2004.

== ITF Circuit finals ==
=== Singles: 13 (7 titles, 6 runner-ups) ===
Legend W75 tournaments W25/35 tournaments W15 tournaments	Finals by surface Hard (0–3) Clay (7–2) Carpet (0–1)

Result	W–L	Date	Tournament	Tier	Surface	Opponent	Score
Loss	0–1	Feb 2018	ITF Hammamet, Tunisia	W15	Clay	(Egypt) Sandra Samir	3–6, 3–6
Win	1–1	Aug 2018	ITF Arad, Romania	W15	Clay	(Romania) Andreea Mitu	6–3, 0–6, 6–4
Win	2–1	Sep 2018	ITF Brno, Czech Republic	W15	Clay	(Czech Republic) Diana Šumová	7–6^{(6)}, 6–4
Loss	2–2	Dec 2018	ITF Milovice, Czech Republic	W15	Carpet (i)	(Belgium) Lara Salden	6–4, 4–6, 5–7
Win	3–2	Sep 2019	ITF Székesfehérvár, Hungary	W15	Clay	(Croatia) Silvia Njiric	4–6, 6–4, 7–5
Win	4–2	Oct 2019	ITF Tabarka, Tunisia	W15	Clay	(Bulgaria) Julia Stamatova	6–2, 6–2
Win	5–2	Feb 2020	ITF Monastir, Tunisia	W15	Clay	(France) Alice Ramé	6–1, 3–6, 6–3
Win	6–2	Mar 2020	ITF Monastir, Tunisia	W15	Clay	(Sweden) Susanne Celik	6–2, 6–0
Loss	6–3	Feb 2021	ITF Sharm El Sheikh, Egypt	W15	Hard	(Italy) Lucia Bronzetti	6–7^{(4)}, 0–6
Loss	6–4	May 2021	ITF Šibenik, Croatia	W15	Clay	(France) Léolia Jeanjean	2–6, 4–6
Win	7–4	Nov 2021	ITF Naples, United States	W25	Clay	(South Korea) Jang Su-jeong	7–5, 2–6, 7–5
Loss	7–5	Aug 2022	ITF Ourense, Spain	W25	Hard	Kristina Dmitruk	5–7, 1–6
Loss	7–6	Sep 2023	ITF Santarém, Portugal	W25	Hard	(Spain) Eva Guerrero Álvarez	2–6, 6–4, 5–7

=== Doubles: 18 (11 titles, 7 runner-ups) ===
Legend W25 tournaments W15 tournaments	Finals by surface Hard (3–2) Clay (8–5)

Result	W–L	Date	Tournament	Tier	Surface	Partner	Opponents	Score
Win	1–0	Mar 2018	ITF Hammamet, Tunisia	W15	Clay	(Germany) Natalia Siedliska	(Spain) Alba Carrillo Marín (Spain) Yvonne Cavallé Reimers	7–6^{(5)}, 6–2
Win	2–0	Apr 2018	ITF Tučepi, Croatia	W15	Clay	(Slovenia) Veronika Erjavec	(Croatia) Tena Lukas (Estonia) Saara Orav	6–3, 6–3
Loss	2–1	Sep 2018	Royal Cup, Montenegro	W25	Clay	(Slovenia) Veronika Erjavec	(Czech Republic) Miriam Kolodziejová (Slovenia) Nina Potočnik	6–2, 3–6, [0–10]
Win	3–1	Apr 2019	ITF Tabarka, Tunisia	W15	Clay	(Slovenia) Veronika Erjavec	(France) Émeline Dartron (France) Marie Témin	4–6, 6–3, [10–7]
Win	4–1	May 2019	ITF Tučepi, Croatia	W15	Clay	(Slovenia) Veronika Erjavec	(Serbia) Tamara Malešević (Croatia) Antonia Ružić	6–2, 6–2
Win	5–1	Jun 2019	ITF Banja Luka, Bosnia & Herzegovina	W15	Clay	(Slovenia) Veronika Erjavec	(Czech Republic) Barbora Miklová (Serbia) Elena Milovanović	6–1, 6–3
Loss	5–2	Jul 2019	ITF Prokuplje, Serbia	W15	Clay	(Slovenia) Veronika Erjavec	(Turkey) İpek Öz (Turkey) Melis Sezer	5–7, 5–7
Loss	5–3	Jul 2019	ITF Prokuplje, Serbia	W15	Clay	(Slovenia) Veronika Erjavec	(Russia) Darya Astakhova (Slovakia) Laura Svatiková	3–6, 6–0, [6–10]
Win	6–3	Sep 2019	ITF Székesfehérvár, Hungary	W15	Clay	(Norway) Malene Helgø	(Slovakia) Katarína Kužmová (Slovakia) Laura Svatiková	7–5, 6–1
Win	7–3	Oct 2019	ITF Tabarka, Tunisia	W15	Clay	(Croatia) Silvia Njirić	(Switzerland) Nicole Gadient (Belgium) Chelsea Vanhoutte	6–0, 6–3
Win	8–3	Oct 2019	ITF Tabarka, Tunisia	W15	Clay	(Croatia) Silvia Njirić	(Ukraine) Ganna Poznikhirenko (Germany) Julyette Steur	7–6^{(5)}, 6–4
Loss	8–4	Dec 2020	ITF Monastir, Tunisia	W15	Hard	(Bosnia and Herzegovina) Anita Husarić	(Spain) Yvonne Cavallé Reimers (Serbia) Bojana Marinković	1–6, 4–6
Win	9–4	Dec 2020	ITF Monastir, Tunisia	W15	Hard	(Bosnia and Herzegovina) Anita Husarić	(Spain) Celia Cerviño Ruiz (Denmark) Olivia Gram	6–4, 6–4
Loss	9–5	May 2021	ITF Sibenik, Croatia	W15	Clay	(Italy) Nicole Fossa Huergo	(Croatia) Petra Marčinko (Hungary) Natália Szabanin	4–6, 6–3, [4–10]
Loss	9–6	Aug 2021	Internazionali di Cordenons, Italy	W15	Clay	(Slovenia) Veronika Erjavec	(Italy) Martina Colmegna (United States) Amy Zhu	4–6, 3–6
Win	10–6	May 2022	ITF Tbilisi, Georgia	W25	Hard	(China) Lu Jiajing	(Switzerland) Arlinda Rushiti (Switzerland) Tess Sugnaux	6–2, 4–6, [10–7]
Loss	10–7	Feb 2023	ITF Santo Domingo, Dominican Republic	W25	Hard	(Hong Kong) Eudice Chong	(United States) Sofia Sewing (Latvia) Darja Semeņistaja	3–6, 2–6
Win	11–7	Aug 2023	ITF Vigo, Spain	W25	Hard	(United Kingdom) Sarah Beth Grey	(Italy) Anastasia Abbagnato (Lithuania) Patricija Paukštytė	6–3, 4–6, [11–9]

== National representation ==
=== Fed Cup/Billie Jean King Cup ===
Berberović made her debut for the Bosnia and Herzegovina Fed Cup team in 2017, while it was competing in the Europe/Africa Zone Group I, when she was 17 years and 233 days old.

Group membership World Group II World Group II Play-off Europe/Africa Group (3–1)	Matches by surface Hard (2–1) Clay (1–0)	Matches by type Singles (2–0) Doubles (1–1)	Matches by setting indoors (2–1) outdoors (1–0)

==== Singles (2–0) ====
Edition	Stage	Date	Location	Against	Surface	Opponent	W/L	Score
2018	Z2 PO	Apr 2018	Athens (GRE)	Egypt	Clay	Lamis Alhussein Abdel Aziz	W	6–4, 6–3
2019	Z2 PO	Feb 2019	Esch-sur-Alzette (LUX)	Portugal	Hard (i)	Ana Filipa Santos	W	6–1, 6–1

==== Doubles (1–1) ====
Edition	Stage	Date	Location	Against	Surface	Partner	Opponents	W/L	Score
2017	Z1 PO	Feb 2017	Tallinn (EST)	Portugal	Hard (i)	Anita Husarić	Francisca Jorge; Rita Vilaça	W	6–4, 7–6^{(4)}
2019	Z2 PO	Feb 2019	Esch-sur-Alzette (LUX)	Portugal	Hard (i)	Anita Husarić	Maria Inês Fonte; Francisca Jorge	L	6–3, 4–6, 4–6

=== Mediterranean Games ===
==== Doubles: 1 (silver medal) ====
Result	Date	Location	Surface	Partner	Opponent	Score
Loss	Jun 2018	Tarragona, Spain	Clay	(Bosnia and Herzegovina) Dea Herdželaš	(Turkey) Başak Eraydın (Turkey) İpek Öz	6–0, 3–6, [10–12]
