= Anna Arkadianou =

Greek tennis player (born 2001)

- Country (sports): Greece
- Born: 6 June 2001 (age 23)
- Prize money: $5,113

Singles
- Career record: 12–17
- Career titles: 0
- Highest ranking: No. 1202 (26 November 2018)

Doubles
- Career record: 17–11
- Career titles: 2 ITF
- Highest ranking: No. 848 (5 August 2019)

Anna Arkadianou (born 6 June 2001) is a Greek former tennis player.

In her career, Arkadianou won two doubles titles on the ITF Women's Circuit. She reached career-high WTA rankings of 1202 in singles and 848 in doubles.

Arkadianou has represented Greece in the Fed Cup, where she has a win-loss record of 0–2. She played in her first match against British players Harriet Dart and Katie Swan.

Her last appearance on the ITF Circuit was in December 2019.

Arkadianou joined the Florida State Seminoles tennis team in 2021.
