= Judo at the 2018 Mediterranean Games – Women's 70 kg =

Judo competitions

Women's 70 kg at the 2018 Mediterranean Games
- Venue: Cambrils Pavilion
- Date: 28 June
- Competitors: 9 from 9 nations

Medalists
| gold medal | María Bernabéu | Spain |
| silver medal | Carola Paissoni | Italy |
| bronze medal | Nurcan Yılmaz | Turkey |
| bronze medal | Margaux Pinot | France |

The women's 70 kg competition in judo at the 2018 Mediterranean Games was held on 28 June at the Cambrils Pavilion in Cambrils.

== Schedule ==
All times are Central European Summer Time (UTC+2).

| Date | Time | Round |
|---|---|---|
| June 28, 2018 | 10:48 | Round of 16 |
| June 28, 2018 | 11:44 | Quarterfinals |
| June 28, 2018 | 12:48 | Semifinals |
| June 28, 2018 | 13:44 | Repechage |
| June 28, 2018 | 17:48 | Bronze medal |
| June 28, 2018 | 17:56 | Final |

== Results ==
=== Main Round ===
Round of 16
Nurcan Yılmaz (TUR) | 00
Margaux Pinot (FRA) | 11

Quarterfinals
Assmaa Niang (MAR) | 00
Margaux Pinot (FRA) | 01
Anka Pogačnik (SLO) | 00
Carola Paissoni (ITA) | 10
Aleksandra Samardžić (BIH) | 10
Jovana Peković (MNE) | 00
María Bernabéu (ESP) | 10
Souad Bellakehal (ALG) | 00

Semifinals
Margaux Pinot (FRA) | 00
Carola Paissoni (ITA) | 10
Aleksandra Samardžić (BIH) | 00
María Bernabéu (ESP) | 10

Final
Carola Paissoni (ITA) | 00
María Bernabéu (ESP) | 10

=== Repechage ===
| Repechage 1 | | Repechage 2 | | Bronze medal |
| Nurcan Yılmaz (TUR) | 10 |
| Assmaa Niang (MAR) | 00 | Nurcan Yılmaz (TUR) | 01 |
| | | Anka Pogačnik (SLO) | 00 |
| | | | | Nurcan Yılmaz (TUR) | 10 |
| | | | | Aleksandra Samardžić (BIH) | 00 |

| Repechage 1 | Repechage 2 | | Bronze medal |
| | Jovana Peković (MNE) | 00 |
| | Souad Bellakehal (ALG) | 10 |
| | | | Souad Bellakehal (ALG) | 00 |
| | | | Margaux Pinot (FRA) | 11 |
