= Judo at the 2018 Mediterranean Games – Men's 100 kg =

Judo competition

Men's 100 kg at the 2018 Mediterranean Games
- Venue: Cambrils Pavilion
- Date: 29 June
- Competitors: 11 from 11 nations

Medalists
| gold medal | Ramadan Darwish | Egypt |
| silver medal | Giuliano Loporchio | Italy |
| bronze medal | Lyès Bouyacoub | Algeria |
| bronze medal | Alexandre Iddir | France |

The men's 100 kg competition in judo at the 2018 Mediterranean Games was held on 29 June at the Cambrils Pavilion in Cambrils.

== Schedule ==
All times are Central European Summer Time (UTC+2).

| Date | Time | Round |
|---|---|---|
| June 29, 2018 | 10:00 | Round of 16 |
| June 29, 2018 | 10:56 | Quarterfinals |
| June 29, 2018 | 11:44 | Semifinals |
| June 29, 2018 | 13:20 | Repechage |
| June 29, 2018 | 17:16 | Bronze medal |
| June 29, 2018 | 17:24 | Final |

== Results ==
=== Main Round ===
Round of 16
Denis Šajher (SLO) | 00
Georgios Malliaropoulos (GRE) | 10
Ali Erdoğan (TUR) | 00
Miloš Mandić (BIH) | 01
Danilo Pantić (MNE) | 01
Pedro Jiménez (ESP) | 00

Quarterfinals
Ramadan Darwish (EGY) | 10
Georgios Malliaropoulos (GRE) | 00
Alexandre Iddir (FRA) | 10
Anis Ben Khaled (TUN) | 00
Lyès Bouyacoub (ALG) | 10
Miloš Mandić (BIH) | 00
Giuliano Loporchio (ITA) | 10
Danilo Pantić (MNE) | 00

Semifinals
Ramadan Darwish (EGY) | 10
Alexandre Iddir (FRA) | 01
Lyès Bouyacoub (ALG) | 00
Giuliano Loporchio (ITA) | 10

Final
Ramadan Darwish (EGY) | 10
Giuliano Loporchio (ITA) | 00

=== Repechage ===
| Repechage | | Bronze medal |
| Georgios Malliaropoulos (GRE) | 00 |
| Anis Ben Khaled (TUN) | 01 | Anis Ben Khaled (TUN) | 00 |
| | | Lyès Bouyacoub (ALG) | 11 |

| Repechage | | Bronze medal |
| Miloš Mandić (BIH) | 10 |
| Danilo Pantić (MNE) | 00 | Miloš Mandić (BIH) | 00 |
| | | Alexandre Iddir (FRA) | 11 |
