= Football at the 2018 Mediterranean Games – Men's team squads =

Below are the squads for the Football at the 2018 Mediterranean Games, hosted in Tarragona, Spain, and took place between 22 and 30 June 2018. Teams were national U18 sides.

== Group A ==
=== Algeria ===
Head coach: Boualem Charef

No.	Pos.	Player	Date of birth (age)	Caps	Club
1	GK	Redouane Maachou	4 February 2001 (aged 17)		(Algeria) USM Bel Abbès
2	MF	Abdelkahar Kadri	24 June 2000 (aged 17)		(Algeria) Paradou AC
3	DF	Aymen Mohamed Belaribi	21 October 2000 (aged 17)		(Algeria) ASM Oran
4	MF	Wassim Aouachria	12 May 2000 (aged 18)		(France) Olympique de Marseille
5	DF	Ahmed Mohamed Kerroum	27 June 2000 (aged 17)		(Algeria) ASM Oran
6	DF	Mohamed Amine Tougaï	22 January 2000 (aged 18)		(Algeria) NA Hussein Dey
7	FW	Zerroug Boucif	20 September 2000 (aged 17)		(Algeria) Paradou AC
8	MF	Adem Zorgane	6 January 2000 (aged 18)		(Algeria) Paradou AC
9	MF	Karim Chaban	6 January 2000 (aged 18)		(Belgium) RSC Anderlecht
10	MF	Hmida Zeghnoun	15 August 2001 (aged 16)		(Algeria) USM Bel-Abbès
11	DF	Abdelkader Alaa-Eddine Belharrane	11 August 2000 (aged 17)		(Algeria) ASM Oran
12	MF	Ishak Talal Boussouf	22 August 2001 (aged 16)		(Algeria) ES Sétif
13	DF	Aïssa Boudechicha	13 April 2000 (aged 18)		(Algeria) CA Bordj Bou Arréridj
14	FW	Merouane Zerrouki	25 January 2001 (aged 17)		(Algeria) Paradou AC
15	FW	Mohamed Amine Baghdaoui	20 March 2000 (aged 18)		(Algeria) ASM Oran
16	GK	Karam Hamdad	27 July 2000 (aged 17)		(Algeria) JS Kabylie
17	FW	Idir Boutrif	6 February 2000 (aged 18)		(Belgium) Standard Liège
18	FW	Brahim Hachoud	5 March 2000 (aged 18)		(Algeria) MC Alger

=== Bosnia and Herzegovina ===
Head coach: Mirza Varešanović

No.	Pos.	Player	Date of birth (age)	Caps	Goals	Club
	GK	Jasmin Kršić	2 March 2000 (aged 18)	0	0	(Football Association of Bosnia and Herzegovina) Željezničar
	GK	Matej Perković	6 May 2000 (aged 18)	0	0	(Football Association of Bosnia and Herzegovina) Široki Brijeg
	DF	Nemanja Vještica	1 February 2000 (aged 18)	0	0	(Football Association of Serbia) Partizan
	DF	Enio Zilić	12 July 2000 (aged 17)	0	0	(Football Association of Bosnia and Herzegovina) Željezničar
	DF	Din Kapetanović	9 May 2000 (aged 18)	0	0	(Football Association of Bosnia and Herzegovina) Olimpic Sarajevo
	DF	Dino-Samuel Kurbegović	21 December 2000 (aged 17)	0	0	(German Football Association) Mainz 05
	MF	Dženan Osmanović	21 January 2000 (aged 18)	0	0	(Football Association of Bosnia and Herzegovina) Željezničar
	MF	Armin Imamović	17 February 2000 (aged 18)	0	0	(Football Association of Bosnia and Herzegovina) Sarajevo
	MF	Džani Salčin	19 March 2000 (aged 18)	0	0	(Football Association of Bosnia and Herzegovina) Sarajevo
	MF	Domagoj Marušić	19 March 2000 (aged 18)	0	0	(Football Association of Bosnia and Herzegovina) Široki Brijeg
	MF	Alen Mehić	23 February 2001 (aged 17)	0	0	(Italian Football Federation) Atalanta
	MF	Marko Brkić	11 April 2000 (aged 18)	0	0	(Football Association of Bosnia and Herzegovina) Zvijezda 09
	MF	Eldar Šehić	28 April 2000 (aged 18)	0	0	(Football Association of Bosnia and Herzegovina) Željezničar
	MF	Eldin Omerović	26 May 2000 (aged 18)	0	0	(Football Association of Bosnia and Herzegovina) Sloboda Tuzla
	MF	Dal Varešanović	23 May 2001 (aged 17)	0	0	(The Football Association) Liverpool
	FW	Milan Šikanjić	3 January 2000 (aged 18)	0	0	(Football Association of Serbia) Red Star Belgrade
	FW	Ajdin Hasić	7 October 2001 (aged 16)	0	0	(Croatian Football Federation) Dinamo Zagreb
	FW	Ahmed Hasanović	19 May 2000 (aged 18)	0	0	(Football Association of Bosnia and Herzegovina) Željezničar

=== Spain ===
Head coach: Luis de la Fuente

No.	Pos.	Player	Date of birth (age)	Caps	Club
	GK	Arnau Tenas	30 May 2001 (aged 18)		(Spain) Barcelona
	GK	Álvaro Fernández Calvo	10 April 2000 (aged 18)		(Spain) Malaga
	DF	Mateu Morey	2 March 2000 (aged 18)		(Spain) Barcelona
	DF	Juan Miranda	19 January 2000 (aged 18)		(Spain) Barcelona
	DF	Hugo Guillamón	31 January 2000 (aged 18)		(Spain) Valencia
	DF	Víctor Gómez	1 April 2000 (aged 18)		(Spain) Espanyol
	DF	Mujaid Sadick	14 March 2000 (aged 18)		(Spain) Deportivo La Coruña
	DF	Aitor Paredes	29 April 2000 (aged 18)		(Spain) Athletic Bilbao
	MF	Pascu	2 April 2000 (aged 18)		(Spain) Valencia
	MF	Carlos Beitia	15 February 2000 (aged 18)		(Spain) Villarreal
	MF	Roberto López	24 April 2000 (aged 18)		(Spain) Real Sociedad
	MF	Juan Cruz	24 April 2000 (aged 18)		(Spain) Málaga
	MF	Oihan Sancet	25 April 2000 (aged 18)		(Spain) Athletic Bilbao
	MF	Álvaro	1 June 2000 (aged 17)		(Spain) Albacete
	FW	Sergio Gómez	4 September 2000 (aged 17)		(Germany) Borussia Dortmund
	FW	Abel Ruiz	28 January 2000 (aged 18)		(Spain) Barcelona
	FW	José Lara	7 March 2000 (aged 18)		(Spain) Sevilla
	FW	Nacho Díaz	27 June 2000 (aged 17)		(Spain) Villarreal

== Group B ==
=== Italy ===
Head coach: Daniele Franceschini

No.	Pos.	Player	Date of birth (age)	Caps	Club
1	GK	Simone Ghidotti	19 March 2000 (aged 18)		(Italy) Fiorentina
2	DF	Gabriele Ferrarini	9 April 2000 (aged 18)		(Italy) Fiorentina
3	DF	Niccolò Corrado	19 March 2000 (aged 18)		(Italy) Internazionale
4	MF	Marco Pompetti	22 May 2000 (aged 18)		(Italy) Internazionale
5	DF	Emanuele Matteucci	26 January 2000 (aged 18)		(Italy) Empoli
6	DF	Gabriele Corbo	11 January 2000 (aged 18)		(Italy) Spezia
7	MF	Roberto Biancu	19 January 2000 (aged 18)		(Italy) Olbia
8	MF	Lorenzo Gavioli	7 January 2000 (aged 18)		(Italy) Internazionale
9	FW	Davide Merola	27 March 2000 (aged 18)		(Italy) Internazionale
10	FW	Emanuel Vignato	24 August 2000 (aged 17)		(Italy) Chievo
11	FW	Nicola Rauti	17 April 2000 (aged 18)		(Italy) Torino
12	GK	Luca Gemello	3 July 2000 (aged 17)		(Italy) Torino
13	DF	Gabriele Bellodi	2 September 2000 (aged 17)		(Italy) Milan
14	MF	Hans Nicolussi Caviglia	18 June 2000 (aged 18)		(Italy) Juventus
15	FW	Lorenzo Babbi	21 May 2000 (aged 18)		(Italy) Cesena
16	DF	Matteo Piccardo	28 February 2000 (aged 18)		(Italy) Genoa
17	MF	Manolo Portanova	2 June 2000 (aged 18)		(Italy) Juventus
18	FW	Samuele Mulattieri	7 October 2000 (aged 17)		(Italy) Spezia
