= Kosovo at the 2018 Mediterranean Games =

- IOC code: KOS
- NOC: Olympic Committee of Kosovo
- Competitors: 40 in 12 sports
- Medals Ranked 14th: Gold 3 Silver 1 Bronze 0 Total 4

Mediterranean Games appearances (overview)
- 1951; 1955; 1959; 1963; 1967; 1971; 1975; 1979; 1983; 1987; 1991; 1993; 1997; 2001; 2005; 2009; 2013; 2018; 2022

Other related appearances
- Yugoslavia (1951–1991); Serbia and Montenegro (1997–2005); Serbia (2009–)

Kosovo participated for the first time in the 2018 Mediterranean Games in Tarragona, Spain over 10 days from 22 June to 1 July 2018.

== Medal summary ==
=== Medal table ===
Medal	Name	Sport	Event	Date
Gold	Distria Krasniqi	Judo	Women's 52 kg	June 27
Gold	Nora Gjakova	Judo	Women's 57 kg	June 27
Gold	Akil Gjakova	Judo	Men's 73 kg	June 28
Silver	Loriana Kuka	Judo	Women's 78 kg	June 29

== Archery ==
Men

Athlete	Event	Ranking round		Round of 64	Round of 32	Round of 16	Quarterfinals	Semifinals	Final / BM	
Athlete	Event	Score	Seed	Opposition Score	Opposition Score	Opposition Score	Opposition Score	Opposition Score	Opposition Score	Rank
Atdhe Luzhnica	Individual	570	31	Asllani (KOS); L 2-6	did not advance					33
Hazir Asllani	Individual	549	34	Luzhnica (KOS); W 6-2	Štrajhar (SLO); L 2-6	did not advance				17

Women

Athlete	Event	Ranking round		Round of 32	Round of 16	Quarterfinals	Semifinals	Final / BM	
Athlete	Event	Score	Seed	Opposition Score	Opposition Score	Opposition Score	Opposition Score	Opposition Score	Rank
Ardita Zejnullahu	Individual	494	21	Umer (SLO); L 2-6	did not advance				17

== Athletics ==
Key

- Note – Ranks given for track events are within the athlete's heat only
- Q = Qualified for the next round
- q = Qualified for the next round as a fastest loser or, in field events, by position without achieving the qualifying target
- NR = National record
- N/A = Round not applicable for the event
- Bye = Athlete not required to compete in round

Men
Track & road events

Athlete	Event	Semifinal		Final	
Athlete	Event	Result	Rank	Result	Rank
Musa Hajdari	800 m	1:51.26	13	Did not advance	
Astrit Kryeziu	800 m	1:55.41	17	Did not advance	

Women
Track & road events

Athlete	Event	Semifinal		Final	
Athlete	Event	Result	Rank	Result	Rank
Vijona Kryeziu	400 m	56.03	14	Did not advance	
Gresa Bakraçi	800 m	2:13.41	10	Did not advance	

== Beach volleyball ==
Athlete	Event	Preliminary round	Standing	1/8 Finals	Quarterfinals	Semifinals	Final / BM	
Athlete	Event	Opposition Score	Standing	Opposition Score	Opposition Score	Opposition Score	Opposition Score	Rank
Armend Berisha; Faton Mustafa	Men's	Rossi/Caminati (ITA) L 0-2 (7-21, 7-21); Silva/Reis (POR) L 0-2 (11-21, 12–21)	3	Did not advance				17
Vildane Jashari; Valmira Ramadani	Women's	Chamereau/Jupiter (FRA) L 0-2 (6-21, 10–21); Vence/Nezir (TUR) L 0-2 (20-22, 9-21); Zeroual/Siad (MAR) L 0-2 (20-22, 19–21)	4	—	Did not advance			9

== Boxing ==
Athlete	Event	Round of 16	Quarterfinals	Semifinals	Final	
Athlete	Event	Opposition Result	Opposition Result	Opposition Result	Opposition Result	Rank
Besfort Merlaku	Bantamweight	Di Serio (ITA); L 0-5	Did not advance			
Violant Sylejmani	Lightweight	Bye	Oumiha (FRA); L 0-5	Did not advance		5
Patriot Behrami	Light welterweight	Tsanikidis (GRE); L 0-5	Did not advance			
Dielli Vranoci	Welterweight	Magri (ITA); W 3-2	Tabai (TUN); L 1-4	Did not advance		5

== Judo ==
Men

Athlete	Event	Round of 16	Quarterfinals	Semifinals	Repechage 1	Repechage 2	Final / BM	
Athlete	Event	Opposition Result	Opposition Result	Opposition Result	Opposition Result	Opposition Result	Opposition Result	Rank
Akil Gjakova	−73 kg	Bye	Ramírez (ESP); W 10–00	Mohyeldin (EGY); W 01–00	Bye		Çiloğlu (TUR); W 10–00	1st place, gold medalist(s)

Women

Athlete	Event	Round of 16	Quarterfinals	Semifinals	Repechage 1	Repechage 2	Final / BM	
Athlete	Event	Opposition Result	Opposition Result	Opposition Result	Opposition Result	Opposition Result	Opposition Result	Rank
Distria Krasniqi	−52 kg	Bye	Pérez Box (ESP); W 10-00	Korkmaz (TUR); W 10-00	Bye		Giuffrida (ITA); W 01-00	1st place, gold medalist(s)
Nora Gjakova	−57 kg	Bye	Šikić (CRO); W 10-00	Khelifi (TUN); W 10-00	Bye		Boi (ITA); W 10-00	1st place, gold medalist(s)
Laura Fazliu	−63 kg	Obradović (SRB); L 00-10	Did not advance		Belattar (MAR); W 10-00	Belkadi (ALG); W 10-00	Katipoğlu (TUR); L 00-10	5
Loriana Kuka	−78 kg	—	Talarn (ESP); W 10-00	Brolih (SLO); W 01-00	—	Bye	Stangherlin (ITA); L 00-01	2nd place, silver medalist(s)

== Karate ==
Men

Athlete	Event	Round of 16	Quarterfinals	Semifinals	Repechage	Final / BM	
Athlete	Event	Opposition Result	Opposition Result	Opposition Result	Opposition Result	Opposition Result	Rank
Orges Arifi	−60 kg	Pavlov (MKD); L 1-3	did not advance				
Alvin Karaqi	−84 kg	Kvesić (CRO); W 4-3	el-Masry (EGY); L 1-5	did not advance			
Herolind Nishevci	+84 kg	Bye	el-Asfar (EGY); L 1-2	Did not advance	Bitević (SRB); L 0-2	Did not advance	7

Women

Athlete	Event	Round of 16	Quarterfinals	Semifinals	Repechage	Final / BM	
Athlete	Event	Opposition Result	Opposition Result	Opposition Result	Opposition Result	Opposition Result	Rank
Adelina Rama	−61 kg	Stefanovska (MKD); W 8-0	Lofty (EGY); L 1-10	Did not advance	Simão (POR); W 2-0	Ferrer (ESP); L 0-1	5
Fortesa Orana	+68 kg	Chatziliadou (GRE); L 0-5	did not advance		Bujas Čelan (CRO); L 1-2	Did not advance	7

== Shooting ==
Men

Athlete	Event	Qualification		Final	
Athlete	Event	Points	Rank	Points	Rank
Nexhat Sahiti	10 m air pistol	560	15	Did not advance	

== Swimming ==
Men

Athlete	Event	Heat		Final	
Athlete	Event	Time	Rank	Time	Rank
Dren Ukimeraj	50 m freestyle	26.09	20	Did not advance	
Dren Ukimeraj	100 m freestyle	56.58	22	Did not advance	
Dren Ukimeraj	200 m freestyle	2:05.28	23	Did not advance	
Dion Kadriu	100 m freestyle	56.49	21	Did not advance	
Dion Kadriu	200 m freestyle	2:04.43	22	Did not advance	
Dion Kadriu	50 m backstroke	30.43	20	Did not advance	
Dion Kadriu	100 m butterfly	1:03.89	14	Did not advance	
Dasar Xhambazi	50 m breaststroke	32.11	21	Did not advance	
Dasar Xhambazi	100 m breaststroke	1:11.51	18	Did not advance	

Women

Athlete	Event	Heat		Final	
Athlete	Event	Time	Rank	Time	Rank
Fjorda Shabani	50 m freestyle	28.49	23	Did not advance	
Fjorda Shabani	50 m backstroke	32.17	14	Did not advance	
Fjorda Shabani	100 m backstroke	1:07.69	10	Did not advance	
Eda Zeqiri	50 m backstroke	32.36	15	Did not advance	
Eda Zeqiri	100 m backstroke	1:09.42	11	Did not advance	

== Table tennis ==
Men

Athlete	Event	Round Robin 1		Round Robin 2		Quarterfinal	Semifinal	Final / BM	Rank
Athlete	Event	Opposition Score	Rank	Opposition Score	Rank	Opposition Score	Opposition Score	Opposition Score	Rank
Kreshnik Mahmuti	Singles	Carvalho (POR) L 0-4 (5-11, 3–11, 6–11, 5–11); Tosuni (ALB) W 4-0 (11-4, 11–5, 11–9, 11–9); Robinot (FRA) L 0-4 (1-11, 6–11, 7–11, 2–11)	3	Did not advance					
Fatih Karabaxhak	Singles	Cantero (ESP) L 0-4 (walkover); Konstantinopoulos (GRE) L 0-4 (walkover); Gündüz (TUR) L 0-4 (walkover)	4	Did not advance					
Fatih Karabaxhak; Kreshnik Mahmuti; Mentor Shabani	Team	—		France (FRA) L 0-3; Spain (ESP) L 0-3	3	Did not advance			

== Taekwondo ==
Men

Athlete	Event	Preliminary round	Quarterfinals	Semifinals	Final	
Athlete	Event	Opposition Score	Opposition Score	Opposition Score	Opposition Score	Rank
Qendrim Sejfijaj	-68kg	Reçber (TUR); L 6-29	did not advance			
Butrint Ejupi	-80kg	Martínez García (ESP); L 0-26	did not advance			

== Tennis ==
Men

Athlete	Event	Round of 32	Round of 16	Quarterfinals	Semifinals	Final / BM	
Athlete	Event	Opposition Score	Opposition Score	Opposition Score	Opposition Score	Opposition Score	Rank
Granit Bajraliu	Singles	Zili (ALB); W 6–1, 6-0	Müller (FRA); L 2–6, 1-6	Did not advance			
Burim Bytyqi	Singles	Ahouda (MAR); L 0–6, 2-6	Did not advance				
Granit Bajraliu; Burim Bytyqi	Doubles	—	Samaha/Habib (LBN); L 1–6, 4-6	Did not advance			

Women

Athlete	Event	Round of 32	Round of 16	Quarterfinals	Semifinals	Final / BM	
Athlete	Event	Opposition Score	Opposition Score	Opposition Score	Opposition Score	Opposition Score	Rank
Blearta Ukëhaxhaj	Singles	Bechri (TUN); L 1–6, 1-6	Did not advance				

== Weightlifting ==
Women

Athlete	Event	Snatch		Clean & jerk	
Athlete	Event	Result	Rank	Result	Rank
Leonora Brajshori	−53 kg	62	4	80	5
