= Bosnia and Herzegovina at the 2018 Mediterranean Games =

- IOC code: BIH
- NOC: Olympic Committee of Bosnia and Herzegovina

in Tarragona, Spain
- Competitors: 70 in 14 sports
- Medals Ranked 19th: Gold 1 Silver 1 Bronze 3 Total 5

Mediterranean Games appearances (overview)
- 1993; 1997; 2001; 2005; 2009; 2013; 2018; 2022

Other related appearances
- Yugoslavia (1951–1991)

Bosnia and Herzegovina competed at the 2018 Mediterranean Games in Tarragona, Spain from 22 June to 1 July 2018.

== Medal summary ==
=== Medal table ===
Medal	Name	Sport	Event	Date
Gold	Hamza Alić	Athletics	Men's shot put	27 June
Silver	Nefisa Berberović; Dea Herdželaš	Tennis	Women's doubles	29 June
Bronze	Mesud Pezer	Athletics	Men's shot put	27 June
Bronze	Abedin Mujezinović	Athletics	Men's 800 m	30 June
Bronze	Dejan Mileusnić	Athletics	Men's javelin throw	30 June

Medals by sport
Sport	1st place, gold medalist(s)	2nd place, silver medalist(s)	3rd place, bronze medalist(s)	Total
Athletics	1	0	3	4
Tennis	0	1	0	1
Total	1	1	3	5

Medals by date
Day	Date	1st place, gold medalist(s)	2nd place, silver medalist(s)	3rd place, bronze medalist(s)	Total
5	27 June	1	0	1	2
7	29 June	0	1	0	1
8	30 June	0	0	2	2
Total		1	1	3	5

Medals by gender
Gender	1st place, gold medalist(s)	2nd place, silver medalist(s)	3rd place, bronze medalist(s)	Total
Male	1	0	3	4
Female	0	1	0	1
Total	1	1	3	5

== Athletics ==
Men's

Athlete	Event	Semifinal			Final	
Athlete	Event	Heat	Time	Rank	Time	Rank
Abedin Mujezinović	800 m	1	1:48.12	4 Q	1:48.07	3rd place, bronze medalist(s)
Rusmir Malkočević	400 m hurdles	1	53.02	13	did not advance	

Athlete	Event	Qualification		Final	
Athlete	Event	Result	Rank	Result	Rank
Hamza Alić	Shot put	19.27	4 Q	20.43 SB	1st place, gold medalist(s)
Mesud Pezer	Shot put	20.00	2 Q	19.82	3rd place, bronze medalist(s)
Dejan Mileusnić	Javelin throw			71.95	3rd place, bronze medalist(s)

== Boxing ==
Men

Athlete	Event	Round of 16	Quarterfinal	Semifinal	Final	Rank
Alen Rahimic	56 kg	Zeneli (ALB); L 0-5	Did not advance			9
Haris Mesanovic	64 kg	Orozco (ESP); L 0-5	Did not advance			9
Adem Fetahović	69 kg	Cetinić (CRO); W 4-0	Mohamed (EGY); L 2-3	Did not advance		5
Radenko Tomic	75 kg	Bamba (FRA); L 0-5	Did not advance			9
Dzemal Bosnjak	81 kg	Diabira (FRA); W 4-1	Abdelgawad (EGY); L 1-4	Did not advance		5
Elvir Sendro	91 kg		Aksın (TUR); L 2-3	Did not advance		5
Dašo Simeunović	+91 kg	Hafez (EGY); L 0-5	Did not advance			9

== Canoeing ==
Men

Athlete	Event	Heat			Semifinal		Final		Rank
Athlete	Event	Heat	Time	Rank	Time	Rank	Time	Rank	Rank
Darko Savić	K1 500 m	1	1:58.771	7 QS	1:50.936	6	did not advance		12

== Football ==
Men

Squad list	Preliminary round		Semifinal	Final	Rank
Squad list	Group A	Rank	Semifinal	Final	Rank
Jasmin Kršić; Eldar Šehić; Armin Imamović; Din Kapetanović; Nemanja Vještica; Enio Zilić; Dal Varešanović; Alen Mehić; Milan Šikanjić; Džani Salčin; Eldin Omerović; Matej Perković; Dženan Osmanović; Domagoj Marušić; Marko Brkić; Dino-Samuel Kurbegović; Ajdin Hasić; Ahmed Hasanović	Spain; L 1-2	3	7th-8th match Turkey; L 2-4	Did not advance	8
Jasmin Kršić; Eldar Šehić; Armin Imamović; Din Kapetanović; Nemanja Vještica; Enio Zilić; Dal Varešanović; Alen Mehić; Milan Šikanjić; Džani Salčin; Eldin Omerović; Matej Perković; Dženan Osmanović; Domagoj Marušić; Marko Brkić; Dino-Samuel Kurbegović; Ajdin Hasić; Ahmed Hasanović	Algeria; L 0-2	3	7th-8th match Turkey; L 2-4	Did not advance	8

== Judo ==
Men

Athlete	Event	Pool round			Repechage 1	Semifinal	Final	Rank
Athlete	Event	Pool	First round	Second round	Repechage 1	Semifinal	Final	Rank
Petar Zadro	66 kg	C	Jean (FRA); W 01–00	Gaitero (ESP); L 00-10	Bye	Repechage 2 Sandal (TUR); L 00-10	Did not advance	7
Miloš Mandić	100 kg	C	Erdoğan (TUR); W 01–00	Bouyacoub (ALG); L 00-10	Bye	Repechage 2 Pantić (MNE); W 10-00	3rd place match Iddir (FRA); L 00–11	5
Harun Sadiković	+100 kg	D	Bye	Tsoumitas (GRE); W 10-00		Ćulum (SRB); L 00-01	3rd place match Jaballah (TUN); L 00–10	5

Women

Athlete	Event	Pool round			Repechage 1	Semifinal	Final	Rank
Athlete	Event	Pool	First round	Second round	Repechage 1	Semifinal	Final	Rank
Andjela Samardžić	63 kg	A	Deketer (FRA); L 00–10	did not advance				9
Aleksandra Samardžić	70 kg	C	Bye	Peković (MNE); W 10–00		Bernabéu (ESP); L 00-10	3rd place match Yılmaz (TUR); L 00–10	5

== Karate ==
Men's kumite

Athlete	Event	1/8 final	Quarterfinal	Semifinal	Final	Rank
Meris Muhović	84 kg	Jakupi (MKD); L 1-1		Repechage; Martina (ITA); L 0-2	Did not advance	7

Women's kumite

Athlete	Event	1/8 final	Quarterfinal	Semifinal	Final	Rank
Ivona Ćavar	68 kg	Clara (POR); W 3-1	Semeraro (ITA); L 0-0	Repechage; Raković (MNE); L 0-0	Did not advance	7
Mirnesa Bektaš	+68 kg	Ferracuti (ITA); W 4-3	Garcia (FRA); L 4-4	Bye	3rd place match Palacio (ESP); L 1–3	5

== Rhythmic gymnastics ==
Women

Athlete	Event	Qualification						Final					
Athlete	Event	Hoop	Ball	Clubs	Ribbon	Total	Rank	Hoop	Ball	Clubs	Ribbon	Total	Rank
Azra Kadrić	All-around	8.100	6.750	7.300	5.050	27.200	23	did not advance					
Sara Ažman	All-around	7.300	7.500	7.800	3.350	25.950	24	did not advance					
Ajša Mujačić	All-around	6.300	4.850	6.550	5.250	22.950	25	did not advance					

== Shooting ==
Women

Athlete	Event	Qualification		Final	
Athlete	Event	Points	Rank	Points	Rank
Tatjana Đekanović	10 m air rifle	614.3	15	did not advance	
Segmedina Bjelošević	10 m air rifle	614.0	17	did not advance	

== Swimming ==
Men

Athlete	Event	Heat		Final	
Athlete	Event	Time	Rank	Time	Rank
Nikola Bjelajac	50 m freestyle	22.96	8 q	22.84	8
Nikola Bjelajac	100 m freestyle	50.47	10	did not advance	
Adi Mešetović	50 m freestyle	23.19	12	did not advance	
Adi Mešetović	50 m butterfly	24.59	8 q	24.39	8
Marko Kovačić	100 m freestyle	52.63	17	did not advance	
Marko Kovačić	200 m freestyle	1:54.80	17	did not advance	
Marko Kovačić	400 m freestyle	4:04.07	15	did not advance	

Women

Athlete	Event	Heat		Final	
Athlete	Event	Time	Rank	Time	Rank
Lamija Medošević	50 m freestyle	27.01	16	did not advance	
Lamija Medošević	100 m freestyle	58.46	16	did not advance	
Lamija Medošević	200 m medley	2:23.88	11	did not advance	
Emina Pašukan	50 m breaststroke	33.10	11	did not advance	
Emina Pašukan	100 m breaststroke	1:12.33	12	did not advance	
Emina Pašukan	200 m breaststroke	2:35.80	9	did not advance	
Amina Kajtaz	50 m butterfly	27.50	9	did not advance	
Amina Kajtaz	100 m butterfly	59.87	4 q	59.87	6

Paralympic Swimming
Men

Athlete	Event	Heat		Final	
Athlete	Event	Time	Rank	Time	Rank
Nermin Memić	100 m freestyle S10	1:29.95	12	did not advance	

== Table tennis ==
Women

Athlete	Event	Round Robin 1				Round Robin 2					Quarterfinal	Semifinal	Final / BM	Rank
Athlete	Event	Group	Opposition Score	Opposition Score	Rank	Group	Opposition Score	Opposition Score	Opposition Score	Rank	Opposition Score	Opposition Score	Opposition Score	Rank
Snežana Marković	Singles	D	Dvorak (ESP); L 0–4; 11-13, 4-11, 9-11, 7-11	Toliou (GRE); L 1–4; 11-5, 6-11, 9-11, 5-11, 6-11	3	did not advance								
Emina Hadžiahmetović	Singles	C	Piccolin (ITA); L 1–4; 11-5, 8-11, 6-11, 7-11, 6-11	Saidani (TUN); W 4–1; 11-9, 9-11, 11-7, 11-2, 11-6	2 Q	L	Zarif (FRA); W 4–3; 6-11, 8-11, 11-2, 4-11, 11-9, 12-10, 11-8	Hassan (EGY); L 2–4; 5-11, 11-7, 12-14, 11-7, 7-11, 7-11	Dvorak (ESP); W 4–2; 11-9, 6-11, 11-8, 12-10, 5-11, 11-7	2 Q	Lupulesku (SRB); L 2–4; 11-13, 11-8, 11-8, 4-11, 5-11, 6-11	did not advance		5
Snežana Marković; Emina Hadžiahmetović	Team	A	Egypt (EGY); L 0–3	Serbia (SRB); L 0–3	3	did not advance								

== Taekwondo ==
Men

Athlete	Event	Round of 16	Quarterfinals	Semifinals	Final / BM	
Athlete	Event	Opposition Result	Opposition Result	Opposition Result	Opposition Result	Rank
Nedžad Husić	−68 kg	Pantar (SLO); L 24–26	Did not advance			9
Karlo Galić	−80 kg	Sarı (TUR); L 0–6	did not advance			9

== Tennis ==
Women

Athlete	Event	Round of 32	Round of 16	Quarterfinals	Semifinals	Final / BM	Rank
Athlete	Event	Opposition Score	Opposition Score	Opposition Score	Opposition Score	Opposition Score	Rank
Nefisa Berberović	Singles	Boudjadi (ALG); W 2–0; 6-0, 6-0	Stefanini (ITA); L 0–2; 4-6, 2-6	did not advance			9
Dea Herdželaš	Singles	Bye	Bronzetti (ITA); L 0–2; 4-6, 1-6	did not advance			9
Nefisa Berberović; Dea Herdželaš	Doubles	—N/a	Bye	Omirou (CYP); Siopacha (CYP); W 2-0; 7-6, 6-2	Ferro (FRA); Tan (FRA); W 2-1; 6-7, 6-4, 10-8	Eraydın (TUR); Öz (TUR); L 1-2; 6-0, 3-6, 10-12	2nd place, silver medalist(s)

== Volleyball ==
Women

Squad list	Preliminary round		Quarterfinal	Semifinal	Final	Rank
Squad list	Group B	Rank	Quarterfinal	Semifinal	Final	Rank
Ajla Paradžik; Katarina Popović; Dajana Bošković; Sanja Kojić-Djurić; Nataša Slijepčević; Edina Selimović; Milica Ivković; Verica Simić; Milana Božić; Ana Gajić; Ajla Hadžić; Anđelka Radišković	Turkey; L 1–3; 22–25, 15–25, 25–19, 18–25	3	Did not advance			9
Ajla Paradžik; Katarina Popović; Dajana Bošković; Sanja Kojić-Djurić; Nataša Slijepčević; Edina Selimović; Milica Ivković; Verica Simić; Milana Božić; Ana Gajić; Ajla Hadžić; Anđelka Radišković	Spain; L 0–3; 22–25, 16–25, 21–25	3	Did not advance			9

== Weightlifting ==
Men

Athlete	Event	Snatch					Clean & Jerk				
Athlete	Event	1	2	3	Result	Rank	1	2	3	Result	Rank
Eldin Omerović	−94 kg	~~123~~	~~125~~	~~125~~	-	DNF	151	~~156~~	~~156~~	151	6
