= Judo at the 2018 Mediterranean Games – Men's 73 kg =

Judo competition

Men's 73 kg at the 2018 Mediterranean Games
- Venue: Cambrils Pavilion
- Date: 28 June
- Competitors: 15 from 15 nations

Medalists
gold medal	Akil Gjakova	Kosovo
silver medal	Bilal Çiloğlu	Turkey
bronze medal	Fabio Basile	Italy
bronze medal	Mohamed Mohyeldin	Egypt

The men's 73 kg competition in judo at the 2018 Mediterranean Games was held on 28 June at the Cambrils Pavilion in Cambrils.

== Schedule ==
All times are Central European Summer Time (UTC+2).

Date	Time	Round
June 28, 2018	10:00	Round of 16
June 28, 2018	11:36	Quarterfinals
June 28, 2018	12:56	Semifinals
June 28, 2018	13:44	Repechage
June 28, 2018	17:00	Bronze medal
June 28, 2018	17:08	Final

== Results ==
=== Main Round ===
Round of 16
Jorge Fernandes (POR)	00
Javier Ramírez (ESP)	01
Benjamin Axus (FRA)	10
Ahmed Elkawisah (LBA)	00
Mohamed Mohyeldin (EGY)	10
Roudolf Kourtides (CYP)	00
Bilal Çiloğlu (TUR)	10
Nikola Gardašević (MNE)	00
Martin Hojak (SLO)	10
Jon Vrenozi (ALB)	00
Ahmed El Meziati (MAR)	00
Fethi Nourine (ALG)	10
Fabio Basile (ITA)	10
Cédric Bessi (MON)	00

Quarterfinals
Akil Gjakova (KOS)	10
Javier Ramírez (ESP)	00
Benjamin Axus (FRA)	00
Mohamed Mohyeldin (EGY)	01
Bilal Çiloğlu (TUR)	10
Martin Hojak (SLO)	00
Fethi Nourine (ALG)	00
Fabio Basile (ITA)	10

Semifinals
Akil Gjakova (KOS)	01
Mohamed Mohyeldin (EGY)	00
Bilal Çiloğlu (TUR)	10
Fabio Basile (ITA)	00

Final
Akil Gjakova (KOS)	10
Bilal Çiloğlu (TUR)	00

=== Repechage ===
Repechage 1		Repechage 2		Bronze medal
		Javier Ramírez (ESP)	10
Roudolf Kourtides (CYP)	10	Roudolf Kourtides (CYP)	01
Benjamin Axus (FRA)	01			Javier Ramírez (ESP)	00
				Fabio Basile (ITA)	01

Repechage 1		Repechage 2		Bronze medal
Nikola Gardašević (MNE)	10
Martin Hojak (SLO)	00	Nikola Gardašević (MNE)	00
Cédric Bessi (MON)	01	Fethi Nourine (ALG)	10
Fethi Nourine (ALG)	10			Fethi Nourine (ALG)	00
				Mohamed Mohyeldin (EGY)	10
