= Algeria at the 2018 Mediterranean Games =

- IOC code: ALG
- NOC: Algerian Olympic Committee
- Competitors: 233 in 24 sports
- Flag bearer: Reda Benbaziz
- Medals Ranked 15th: Gold 2 Silver 4 Bronze 7 Total 13

Mediterranean Games appearances (overview)
- 1967; 1971; 1975; 1979; 1983; 1987; 1991; 1993; 1997; 2001; 2005; 2009; 2013; 2018; 2022

Algeria competed at the 2018 Mediterranean Games in Tarragona, Catalonia, Spain over 10 days from 22 June to 1 July 2018. In this session, Algeria participated with 233 athletes in 24 sports, the second largest participation after the Algeria Games in 1975. After a little late over an hour flight, the special plane that transported the Algerian delegation landed on the tarmac of the regional Airport of Reus, Catalonia. The first wave of the Algerian delegation, 144 people including 67 athletes, 7 referees, 8 COA members, 10 medical staff and journalists. The first medal in the games was in karate by Oualid Bouabaoub in bronze weight −75 kg kumite, is the only one on the first day, The first gold medal was awarded to Hocine Daïkhi in Karate, also weighing +84 kg kumite, then in the evening the swimmer Oussama Sahnoune achieved the second Golden Medal of the 100 m freestyle, the first of its kind in swimming since Almería 2005. On the third day, Sahnoune managed to add a second medal in his 50 m freestyle of silver, the first for Algeria of this type in this games. In Wrestling Greco-Roman, Algeria achieved two silver medals for Bachir Sid Azara in −87 kg and Adem Boudjemline in −97 kg after losing in the final against both Metehan Başar and Mélonin Noumonvi respectively.

== Medal summary ==
=== Medal table ===
Medal	Name	Sport	Event	Date
Gold	Hocine Daïkhi	Karate	Men's +84 kg kumite	24 June
Gold	Oussama Sahnoune	Swimming	Men's 100 m freestyle	24 June
Silver	Oussama Sahnoune	Swimming	Men's 50 m freestyle	25 June
Silver	Bachir Sid Azara	Wrestling	Men's Greco-Roman −87 kg	25 June
Silver	Adem Boudjemline	Wrestling	Men's Greco-Roman −97 kg	25 June
Silver	Yasser Triki	Athletics	Long jump	30 June
Bronze	Oualid Bouabaoub	Karate	Men's −75 kg kumite	23 June
Bronze	Saddam Messaoui	Weightlifting	Men's 94 kg	26 June
Bronze	Lyès Bouyacoub	Judo	Men's 100 kg	29 June
Bronze	Sonia Asselah	Judo	Women's +78 kg	29 June
Bronze	Reda Benbaziz	Boxing	Lightweight	29 June
Bronze	Mohammed Houmri	Boxing	Light heavyweight	29 June
Bronze	Abdelmalik Lahoulou; Mohamed Belbachir; Saber Boukemouche; Idriss Laredj	Athletics	4 × 400 m relay	30 June

Medals by sport
Sport	1st place, gold medalist(s)	2nd place, silver medalist(s)	3rd place, bronze medalist(s)	Total
Athletics	0	1	1	2
Boxing	0	0	2	2
Swimming	1	1	0	2
Judo	0	0	2	2
Karate	1	0	1	2
Weightlifting	0	0	1	1
Wrestling	0	2	0	2
Total	2	4	7	13

Medals by date
Day	Date	1st place, gold medalist(s)	2nd place, silver medalist(s)	3rd place, bronze medalist(s)	Total
1	23 June	0	0	1	1
2	24 June	2	0	0	2
3	25 June	0	3	0	3
4	26 June	0	0	1	1
5	27 June	0	0	0	0
6	28 June	0	0	0	0
7	29 June	0	0	4	4
8	30 June	0	1	1	2
9	1 July	0	0	0	0
Total		2	4	7	13

Medals by gender
Gender	1st place, gold medalist(s)	2nd place, silver medalist(s)	3rd place, bronze medalist(s)	Total
Male	2	4	6	12
Female	0	0	1	1
Total	2	4	7	13

== Archery ==
Men

Athlete	Event	Ranking round		Round of 64	Round of 32	Round of 16	Quarterfinals	Semifinals	Final / BM	
Athlete	Event	Score	Seed	Opposition Score	Opposition Score	Opposition Score	Opposition Score	Opposition Score	Opposition Score	Rank
Khaled Benahmed	Individual	401	35	Ben Brahim (TUN); W 6-4	Acha González (ESP); L 0-6	did not advance				
Rachad Bouakaz	Individual	400	36	Beatović (SRB); L 2-6	did not advance					
Mohamed Rayane Lazreg	Individual	345	39	Panagi (CYP); L 0-6	did not advance					
Mohamed Rayane Lazreg; Rachad Bouakaz; Khaled Benahmed	Team	—N/a		—N/a	—N/a	Panagi; Loizou; Onoufriou (CYP); L 0-6	did not advance			

Women

Athlete	Event	Ranking round		Round of 32	Round of 16	Quarterfinals	Semifinals	Final / BM	
Athlete	Event	Score	Seed	Opposition Score	Opposition Score	Opposition Score	Opposition Score	Opposition Score	Rank
Lina Fatima Serraf	Individual	324	22	Lopez Sanchis (ESP); L 0-6	did not advance				

== Athletics ==
Six Algerian athletes have achieved the minima of participation in the next Mediterranean Games.

Key

- Note – Ranks given for track events are within the athlete's heat only
- Q = Qualified for the next round
- q = Qualified for the next round as a fastest loser or, in field events, by position without achieving the qualifying target
- NR = National record
- N/A = Round not applicable for the event
- Bye = Athlete not required to compete in round

Men
Track & road events

Athlete	Event	Semifinal		Final	
Athlete	Event	Result	Rank	Result	Rank
Mahmoud Hammoudi	100 m	10.72	2 Q	10.61	7
Mohamed Belbachir	800 m	1:49.51	2 Q	1:49.41	6
Yassine Hathat	800 m	1:47.55	2 Q	1:48.21	4
Abdelmalik Lahoulou	400 m hurdles	50.54	3 Q	49.45	4
Saber Boukemouche	400 m hurdles	50.64	4 Q	50.16	6
Hichem Bouchicha	3000 m steeplechase	—N/a		8:40.43	7
Farid Terfaia	Half marathon	—N/a		DSQ	
Mamar Bengriba	Half marathon	—N/a		1:09:03	13
Abdelmalik Lahoulou; Mohamed Belbachir; Saber Boukemouche; Idriss Laredj	4 × 400 m relay	—N/a		3:05.28	3rd place, bronze medalist(s)

Women
Track & road events

Athlete	Event	Semifinal		Final	
Athlete	Event	Result	Rank	Result	Rank
Rima Chenah	3000 m steeplechase	—N/a		9:53.24	7

Field events

Athlete	Event	Semifinal		Final	
Athlete	Event	Distance	Position	Distance	Position
Yasser Triki	Long jump	7.54	7 q	8.01	2nd place, silver medalist(s)

== Badminton ==
The Algerian badminton will be represented by 8 athletes in Tarragona including four girls, but in the absence of the best Algerian player, Hala Bouksani, who passes her baccalaureate.

Men

Athlete	Event	Round of 32	Round of 16	Quarterfinal	Semifinal	Final	Rank
Athlete	Event	Opposition Score	Opposition Score	Opposition Score	Opposition Score	Opposition Score	Rank
Mohamed Guelmaoui	Singles	Greco (ITA); L 19-21, 9-21	did not advance				
Yacine Belhouane	Singles	Kurt (TUR); L 14-21, 9-21	did not advance				
Sifeddine Larbaoui; Mohamed Abdelaziz Ouchefoun	Doubles	—N/a	Kersaudy; Gicquel (FRA); L 7-21, 11-21	Did not advance			

Women

Athlete	Event	Round of 32	Round of 16	Quarterfinal	Semifinal	Final	Rank
Athlete	Event	Opposition Score	Opposition Score	Opposition Score	Opposition Score	Opposition Score	Rank
Linda Mazri	Singles	L. Salehar (SLO); L 11-21, 6-21	did not advance				
Malak Ouchefoune	Singles	Bye	Hosny (EGY); L 11-21, 14-21	did not advance			
Ines Ziani; Dounia Naâma	Doubles	—N/a	L. Salehar; I. Salehar (SLO); L 7-21, 10-21	Did not advance			

== Bowls ==
Lyonnaise

Athlete	Event	Heats				Semifinal	Final / BM	
Athlete	Event	Heat 1	Heat 2	Total	Rank	Score	Score	Rank
Mustapha Zoubeidi	Men's progressive throw	31	32	63	6	Did not advance		
Abdelkrim Makhloufi	Men's precision throw	9	20	29	4 Q	Ćubela (CRO); L 8–16	Mana (ITA); L 14–23	4
Lamia Kherraz	Women's progressive throw	4	8	12	8	Did not advance		
Samia Touloum	Women's precision throw	7	11	18	7	Did not advance		

Pétanque

Athlete	Event	Group stage					Semifinal	Final / BM	
Athlete	Event	Opposition Score	Opposition Score	Opposition Score	Opposition Score	Rank	Opposition Score	Opposition Score	Rank
Mohamed Faycal Ouaghlisi; Farid Hammoudi	Men's doubles	Portugal (POR); W 10–8	Turkey (TUR); L 8–10	Tunisia (TUN); L 5–13	France (FRA); L 2–13	5	Did not advance		
Nacera Benabdelkader; Rabab Leboukh	Women's doubles	N/A	Tunisia (TUN); L 4–12	Italy (ITA); W 10–8	Tunisia (TUN); L 0–13	3	Did not advance		

Raffa

Athlete	Event	Group stage							Semifinal	Final / BM	
Athlete	Event	Opposition Score	Opposition Score	Opposition Score	Opposition Score	Opposition Score	Opposition Score	Rank	Opposition Score	Opposition Score	Rank
Mohamed Belhouchet	Men's singles	Farrugia (MLT); L 7–10	Rouault (FRA); L 11–12	Stjepčević (MNE); L 5–12	Simsek (TUR); L 5–12	Dall'Olmo (SMR); L 5–12	Nanni (ITA); L 3–12	7	Did not advance		

== Boxing ==
Men

Athlete	Event	Round of 16	Quarterfinals	Semifinals	Final	
Athlete	Event	Opposition Result	Opposition Result	Opposition Result	Opposition Result	Rank
Oussama Mordjane	Flyweight	Bye	Cappai (ITA); L 1-4	did not advance		
Khalil Litim	Bantamweight	Bye	Zeneli (ALB); L 2-3	did not advance		
Reda Benbaziz	Lightweight	—N/a	Iozia (ITA); W 4-1	Dogan (TUR); L 1-4	Did not advance	3rd place, bronze medalist(s)
Chemseddine Kramou	Light welterweight	Grmusa (SRB); W 4-1	Erdemir (TUR); L 0-5	did not advance		
Nasreddine Bensaid	Welterweight	Sissokho (ESP); L 2-3	did not advance			
Azzouz Boudia	Middleweight	Kajoshi (ALB); W WO	Ghosoun (EGY); L 0-5	did not advance		
Mohammed Houmri	Light heavyweight	Camacho Fernández (ESP); W 4-1	Cvetković (CRO); W 5-0	Malakan (TUR); L 1-4	Did not advance	3rd place, bronze medalist(s)
Amar Adlane Ouarzedine	Super heavyweight	—N/a	Mulayes (SYR); L 0-5	did not advance		

== Canoeing ==
=== Slalom ===
Athlete	Event	Heats		Semifinal		Final	
Athlete	Event	Time	Rank	Time	Rank	Time	Rank
Nacer Eddine Baghdadi	Men's K-1 200 m	00:40.046	6 QS	00:39.868	6	did not advance	
Samir Laouar	Men's K-1 500 m	01:54.937	6 QS	01:51.907	7	did not advance	
Anfel Arabi	Women's K-1 200 m	00:56.874	6 QS	00:54.008	5	did not advance	
Halla Bouzid	Women's K-1 500 m	02:24.732	5 QS	02:24.050	5	did not advance	

=== Sprint ===
Athlete	Event	Heats		Semifinal		Final	
Athlete	Event	Time	Rank	Time	Rank	Time	Rank
Abdelkader Akrame Keddi; Samir Laouar	Men's K-2 500 m	01:43.447	5 QS	01:48.531	5	did not advance	

== Cycling ==
Athlete	Event	Time	Rank
Abderaouf Bengayou	Men's road race	DNF	
Abderrahmane Mehdi Hamza	Men's road race	4:03:18	46
Yacine Hamza	Men's road race	4:03:13	36
Abderrahmane Mansouri	Men's road race	DNF	
Abderrahmane Mansouri	Men's time trial	32:55.73	13
Islam Mansouri	Men's road race	DNF	
Islam Mansouri	Men's time trial	DNS	
Oussama Mansouri	Men's road race	DNF	
Ismail Medjahed	Men's road race	DNF	
Youcef Reguigui	Men's road race	4:03:13	34

== Equestrian ==
It is composed of five riders who have distinguished themselves in competitions at the national level, under the leadership of the French coach Guillaume Blin Lebreton, they are Brahim Ait Lounis, Mahi Amine, Boughrab Ali, Abdelkrim Benbernou and the young rider Manon Hebette who lives in France and remains on good performances this season.

== Fencing ==
Men

Athlete	Event	Group stage					Round of 16	Quarterfinal	Semifinal	Final / BM	
Athlete	Event	Opposition Score	Opposition Score	Opposition Score	Opposition Score	Rank	Opposition Score	Opposition Score	Opposition Score	Opposition Score	Rank
Maxime Ichem Cade	Individual épée	Buhdeima (LBA); L 3-4	Elkhoury (LBN); W 5-2	Elkord (MAR); W 5-3	El Sokkary (EGY); L 3-5	3	Elkord (MAR); L 6-15	did not advance			

== Football ==
=== Team ===
- Redouane Maachou
- Aek Alaa Eddine Belharrane
- Mohamed Amine Tougai
- Ahmed Mohamed Kerroum
- Aïssa Boudechicha
- Aymen Mohammed Belaribi
- Abdelkahar Kadri
- Karam Hamdad
- Hmida Zeghnoun
- Adem Zorgane
- Brahim Hachoud
- Mohamed Amine Baghdaoui
- Zerroug Boucif
- Merouane Zerrouki
- Karim Chaban
- Ishak Boussouf
- Wassim Aouachria
- Idir Boutrif

=== Group A ===
The draw took place on May 10 and Algeria signed in the group A with hosts Spain and Bosnia and Herzegovina.

Pos	Team	Pld	W	D	L	GF	GA	GD	Pts	Qualification
1	Spain (H)	2	2	0	0	6	2	+4	6	Semifinals
2	Algeria	2	1	0	1	3	4	−1	3	
3	Bosnia and Herzegovina	2	0	0	2	1	4	−3	0	

Source: Tarragona 2018
(H) Hosts
22 June 2018
13:00

Algeria	1–4	Spain
Boutrif 74'	Report	Ruiz 6', 17'; S. Gómez 12', 21'

Estadi Municipal de Calafell, Calafell
Referee: Halil Umut Meler (Turkey)

26 June 2018
17:00

Algeria	2–0	Bosnia and Herzegovina
Boutrif 55'; Zorgane 82'	Report

Estadi Municipal de La Pobla de Mafumet, La Pobla de Mafumet
Referee: Jérôme Brisard (France)

=== Fifth place match ===
29 June 2018
18:00

Algeria	0–1	France
	Report	Badu 90+1'

Estadi Municipal de Calafell, Calafell
Referee: Ioannis Papadopoulos (Greece)

== Handball ==
=== Men's tournament ===
Team.
- Abdellah Benmenni GK (GS Pétroliers)
- Ghedbane Khelifa GK (GS Pétroliers)
- Réda Idri GK (JSE Skikda)
- Redouane Saker (JSE Skikda)
- Mouloud Bouriche
- Abderrahim Berriah (GS Pétroliers)
- Ayoub Abdi
- Kheïreddine Roumache (IC Ouargla)
- Ayatallah el Khoumini Hamoud (ES Aïn Touta)
- Messaoud Berkous (GS Pétroliers)
- Mohamed Griba (CRBB Arréridj)
- Hossam Guettaf (Nadi Oman)
- Oussama Louchène (ES Aïn Touta)
- Naïm Zoheïr (JSE Skikda)
- Abdallah Zenadi (CRB Baraki)
- Alaedine Hadidi (GS Pétroliers)
Coach: (Algeria) Sofiane Hiouani

Preliminary round
Group B

Pos	Team	Pld	W	D	L	GF	GA	GD	Pts	Qualification
1	Croatia	2	2	0	0	67	52	+15	4	Quarterfinals
2	Algeria	2	1	0	1	64	69	−5	2	Quarterfinals
3	Italy	2	0	0	2	58	68	−10	0	

Source: Tarragona 2018
Rules for classification: 1) Points; 2) Head-to-head points; 3) Head-to-head goal difference; 4) Head-to-head goals scored; 5) Goal difference; 6) Goals scored; 7) Draw.

24 June 2018; 12:00	Croatia	37–26	Algeria	Campclar Sports Palace, Tarragona; Referees: Macías, Ruiz (ESP)
24 June 2018; 12:00	Mandić 7	(19–13)	Abdi 7	Campclar Sports Palace, Tarragona; Referees: Macías, Ruiz (ESP)
24 June 2018; 12:00	1× (yellow card) 6× (suspension)	Report	2× (yellow card) 4× (suspension)	Campclar Sports Palace, Tarragona; Referees: Macías, Ruiz (ESP)

25 June 2018; 10:00	Italy	32–38	Algeria	Campclar Sports Palace, Tarragona; Referees: Jovandić, Sekulić (SRB)
25 June 2018; 10:00	Marrochi 7	(15–16)	Berkous 11	Campclar Sports Palace, Tarragona; Referees: Jovandić, Sekulić (SRB)
25 June 2018; 10:00	3× (yellow card) 2× (suspension)	Report	3× (yellow card) 4× (suspension)	Campclar Sports Palace, Tarragona; Referees: Jovandić, Sekulić (SRB)

Quarterfinal

27 June 2018; 10:00	Tunisia	30–25	Algeria	Campclar Sports Palace, Tarragona; Referees: Soria, Monjo (ESP)
27 June 2018; 10:00	Chouiref 7	(14–12)	Hamoud 7	Campclar Sports Palace, Tarragona; Referees: Soria, Monjo (ESP)
27 June 2018; 10:00	2× (yellow card) 3× (suspension)	Report	3× (yellow card) 6× (suspension)	Campclar Sports Palace, Tarragona; Referees: Soria, Monjo (ESP)

5–8th place semifinals

28 June 2018; 17:30	Algeria	32–33	Portugal	Campclar Sports Palace, Tarragona; Referees: Chaskis, Tsakonas (GRE)
28 June 2018; 17:30	Berriah, Hamoud 5	(15–18)	Gomes 12	Campclar Sports Palace, Tarragona; Referees: Chaskis, Tsakonas (GRE)
28 June 2018; 17:30	3× (yellow card) 4× (suspension)	Report	3× (yellow card) 3× (suspension)	Campclar Sports Palace, Tarragona; Referees: Chaskis, Tsakonas (GRE)

Seventh place game

30 June 2018; 10:00	Algeria	30–28	Serbia	Campclar Sports Palace, Tarragona; Referees: Hoz, Riloba (ESP)
30 June 2018; 10:00	Abdi 10	(16–14)	Matičić 7	Campclar Sports Palace, Tarragona; Referees: Hoz, Riloba (ESP)
30 June 2018; 10:00	2× (yellow card) 5× (suspension) 1× (red card)	Report	2× (yellow card) 5× (suspension)	Campclar Sports Palace, Tarragona; Referees: Hoz, Riloba (ESP)

== Judo ==
Athlete	Event	Round of 16	Quarterfinals	Semifinals	Repechage 1	Repechage 2	Final / BM	
Athlete	Event	Opposition Result	Opposition Result	Opposition Result	Opposition Result	Opposition Result	Opposition Result	Rank
Salim Rebahi	Men's 60 kg	Bye	Bassou (MAR); L 000–100	Did not advance	—N/a	Florimont (FRA); L 000–010	did not advance	
Houd Zourdani	Men's 66 kg	Cullhaj (ALB); W 100–010	Bassou (MAR); W 000–100	Did not advance	Mahfod (SYR); W 110–010	Jereb (SLO); L 000–110	did not advance	
Fethi Nourine	Men's 73 kg	El Meziati (MAR); W 100–000	Basile (ITA); L 000–100	Did not advance	Bessi (MON); W 100–010	Gardašević (MNE); W 100–000	Mohyeldin (EGY); L 000–100	4
Abderahmane Benamadi	Men's 90 kg	Martinho (POR); L 000–100	did not advance					
Lyès Bouyacoub	Men's 100 kg	—N/a	Mandic (BIH); W 100–000	Loporchio (ITA); L 000–100	—N/a	Bye	Ben Khaled (TUN); W 110–000	3rd place, bronze medalist(s)
Mohamed-Amine Tayeb	Men's +100 kg	D'Arco (ITA); L 000–100	did not advance		Yazıcı (TUR); W 100–000	Jaballah (TUN); L 000–100	did not advance	
Hadjer Mecerem	Women's 48 kg	Mercadier (FRA); W 100–010	Nikolić (SRB); L 000–100	Did not advance	Bye	Diogo (POR); L 000–100	did not advance	
Meriem Moussa	Women's 52 kg	Babi (AND); W 100–000	Korkmaz (TUR); L 000–010	Did not advance	Bye	Pérez (ESP); L 000–100	did not advance	
Yamina Halata	Women's 57 kg	Özerler (TUR); W 100–000	Zaraueta (ESP); L 010–100	Did not advance	Bye	Raoui (MAR); L 000–010	did not advance	
Amina Belkadi	Women's 63 kg	Bye	Bjaoui (TUN); L 000–100	Did not advance	Bye	Fazliu (KOS); L 000–100	did not advance	
Souad Bellakehal	Women's 70 kg	Bye	Bernabéu (ESP); L 000–100	Did not advance	Bye	Peković (MNE); W 100–000	Pinot (FRA); L 000–110	4
Kaouthar Ouallal	Women's 78 kg	—N/a	Stangherlin (ITA); L 000–010	Did not advance	—N/a	Dollin (FRA); W 010–000	Brolih (SLO); L 000–100	4
Sonia Asselah	Women's +78 kg	—N/a	Tolofua (FRA); L 000–100	Did not advance	—N/a	Ramirez (POR); W 100–000	Álvarez Folgueira (ESP); W 100–000	3rd place, bronze medalist(s)

== Karate ==
Men

Athlete	Event	Round of 16	Quarterfinals	Semifinals	Repechage	Final / BM	
Athlete	Event	Opposition Result	Opposition Result	Opposition Result	Opposition Result	Opposition Result	Rank
Abdelkrim Bouamria	−60 kg	Hribovsek (SLO); W 1–0	Crescenzo (ITA); L 0–0	did not advance			
Mohammed Fayçal Bouakel	−67 kg	Garin (FRA); L 1–4	did not advance		Ennkhaili (ESP); L 1–3	did not advance	
Oualid Bouabaoub	−75 kg	Bye	Loizides (CYP); W 1–0	Eltemur (TUR); L 0–3	Bye	Ibañez Saenz Torre (ESP); W 2–0	3rd place, bronze medalist(s)
Anis samy Brahimi	−84 kg	Da Costa (FRA); L 1–2	did not advance		Frigui (TUN); L 2–2	did not advance	
Hocine Daïkhi	+84 kg	Marino (ITA); W 4–4	Ezzar (TUN); W 8–0	Arsovski (MKD); W 9–1	Bye	Elasfar (EGY); W 3–2	1st place, gold medalist(s)

Women

Athlete	Event	Round of 16	Quarterfinals	Semifinals	Repechage	Final / BM	
Athlete	Event	Opposition Result	Opposition Result	Opposition Result	Opposition Result	Opposition Result	Rank
Saida Djedra	−55 kg	Fernández Osorio (ESP); L 2–5	did not advance				
Widad Draou	−61 kg	Bye	Ferrer Garcia (ESP); L 1–5	did not advance			
Lamya Matoub	−68 kg	Avazeri (FRA); W 0–0	Pušnik (SLO); L 1–3	did not advance			

== Rowing ==
Athlete	Event	Heats		Repechage		Semifinal		Final	
Athlete	Event	Time	Rank	Time	Rank	Time	Rank	Time	Rank
Mohamed Djouimai	M1x	3:32.480	3 R	3:38.254	4 FB	—N/a		3:42.867	7
Sid Ali Boudina	LM1x	3:35.386	3 R	3:39.555	2 Q	3:36.800	5 FB	3:39.555	9
Boucif Mohammed Belhadj; Kamel Ait Daoud	LM2x	3:04.913	3 R	3:14.303	2 FB	—N/a		3:14.530	6
Amina Rouba	LW1x	03:43.993	3 R	4:11.148	2 FB	—N/a		4:05.269	6

Qualification Legend: FA=Final A (medal); FB=Final B (non-medal); R=Repechage

== Sailing ==
The athletes selected for the 2018 MG are Hamza Bouras and Meriem Rezouani (RSX), Wassim Ziatni and Nouha Akil (Laser) under the guidance of coaches Fayçal Merzougui (Laser) and Abdenasser Goudjil (RSX).

Men

Athlete	Event	Race											Net points	Final rank
Athlete	Event	1	2	3	4	5	6	7	8	9	10	11	Net points	Final rank
Wassim Ziatni	Laser	16	18	17	9	16	16	17	12	19	~~DNF 21~~	14	154	18
Hamza Bouras	RS:X	10	9	10	~~12~~	10	10	11	12	10	11	10	103	11

Women

Athlete	Event	Race											Net points	Final rank
Athlete	Event	1	2	3	4	5	6	7	8	9	10	11	Net points	Final rank
Nouha Akil	Laser Radial	12	14	~~15~~	13	14	13	14	14	15	15	12	136	15
Meriem Rezouani	RS:X	~~DNF 13~~	11	11	10	11	11	11	10	1	DNF 13	11	100	11

M = Medal race; EL = Eliminated – did not advance into the medal race

== Shooting ==
Men

Athlete	Event	Qualification		Final	
Athlete	Event	Points	Rank	Points	Rank
Amine Adjabi	10 metre air pistol	559	16	Did not advance	
Juba Adoul	10 metre air pistol	524	20	Did not advance	
Koceila Abdoul	10 metre air rifle	601.1	17	Did not advance	
Reda Benzidane	10 metre air rifle	607.9	14	Did not advance	

Women

Athlete	Event	Qualification		Final	
Athlete	Event	Points	Rank	Points	Rank
Yamina Lalouet	10 metre air pistol	548	15	Did not advance	
Halla Medjiah	10 metre air pistol	542	17	Did not advance	
Rania Tikrouchin	10 metre air rifle	594.8	21	Did not advance	
Lynda Benkhoucha	Trap	82	12	Did not advance	

== Swimming ==
For this Mediterranean event, the Algerian Swimming Federation (FAN) has selected 10 swimmers including five girls. They are supervised by three coaches: Ali Maânsri, Abdelkahar Kouhil and the French Olivier Barnier.

Men

Athlete	Event	Heat		Final	
Athlete	Event	Time	Rank	Time	Rank
Oussama Sahnoune	50 m freestyle	22.16	2 Q	21.96 NR	2nd place, silver medalist(s)
Oussama Sahnoune	100 m freestyle	49.03	2 Q	48.00 NR	1st place, gold medalist(s)
Mohamed Anis Djaballah	400 m freestyle	4:02.56	13	did not advance	
Mohamed Anis Djaballah	1500 m freestyle	—N/a		16:05.76	9
Moncef Balamane	50 m breaststroke	30.10	19	did not advance	
Moncef Balamane	100 m breaststroke	1:04.43	16	did not advance	
Moncef Balamane	200 m breaststroke	2:23.24	11	did not advance	
Mohamed Ryad Bouhamidi	50 m backstroke	27.59	18	did not advance	
Mohamed Ryad Bouhamidi	100 m backstroke	58.51	16	did not advance	
Mohamed Ryad Bouhamidi	200 m backstroke	2:07.98	16	did not advance	
Ramzi Chouchar	200 m butterfly	2:07.97	15	did not advance	
Ramzi Chouchar	200 m individual medley	2:07.22	15	did not advance	
Ramzi Chouchar	400 m individual medley	4:31.02	10	did not advance	
Mohamed Anis Djaballah; Moncef Balamane; Mohamed Ryad Bouhamidi; Ramzi Chouchar	4×100 m freestyle relay	—N/a		3:40.93	6

Women

Athlete	Event	Heat		Final	
Athlete	Event	Time	Rank	Time	Rank
Nesrine Medjahed	50 m freestyle	26.91	15	did not advance	
Nesrine Medjahed	100 m freestyle	58.66	17	did not advance	
Nesrine Medjahed	50 m butterfly	28.54	15	did not advance	
Amel Melih	50 m freestyle	26.57	13	did not advance	
Amel Melih	50 m backstroke	29.69	8 Q	29.41	8
Amel Melih	50 m butterfly	28.14	13	did not advance	
Samar Kacha	100 m butterfly	1:06.21	17	did not advance	
Samar Kacha	200 m butterfly	DNS			
Rania Nefsi	200 m individual medley	2:24.51	12	did not advance	
Rania Nefsi	400 m individual medley	5:05.27	9	did not advance	
Rania Nefsi	50 m breaststroke	34.87	13	did not advance	

== Taekwondo ==
Athlete	Event	Round of 16	Quarterfinals	Semifinals	Final	
Athlete	Event	Opposition Result	Opposition Result	Opposition Result	Opposition Result	Rank
Linda Azzeddine	Women's +67 kg	Sarri (GRE); W 31–19	Kuş (TUR); L 1–12	Did not advance		

== Tennis ==
Six tennis players (2 men and 2 ladies) will represent Algeria at the Mediterranean Games in Tarragona.

Men

Athlete	Event	Round of 32	Round of 16	Quarterfinals	Semifinals	Final / BM	
Athlete	Event	Opposition Score	Opposition Score	Opposition Score	Opposition Score	Opposition Score	Rank
Mohamed Hassan	Singles	Urbanija (SLO); L 1–6, 2–6	did not advance				
Nazim Makhlouf	Singles	Ghorbel (TUN); W 7–5, 6–4	Catarina (MON); L 3–6, 7–5, 7–6	did not advance			
Mohamed Hassan; Aimen Ikhlef	Doubles	BYE	Semmler; Lopez (ESP); L 3–6, 2–6	did not advance			

Women

Athlete	Event	Round of 32	Round of 16	Quarterfinals	Semifinals	Final / BM	
Athlete	Event	Opposition Score	Opposition Score	Opposition Score	Opposition Score	Opposition Score	Rank
Amira Benaissa	Singles	Arkadianou (GRE); L 0–6, 3–5	did not advance				
Yassamine Boudjadi	Singles	Berberovic (BIH); L 0–6, 0–6	did not advance				
Amira Benaissa; Yassamine Boudjadi	Doubles	BYE	Murta; Quiterio (POR); L 1–6, 2–6	did not advance			

== Triathlon ==
Athlete	Event	Swim (1.5 km)	Trans 1	Bike (40 km)	Trans 2	Run (10 km)	Total Time	Rank
Mohamed Belhimer	Men's	10:50	00:37	27:24	00:25	18:30	01:07:08	17
Oussama Hellal Berrouane	Men's	10:50	00:34	26:00	00:26	18:00	01:04:52	15

== Volleyball ==
=== Indoor ===
Men's tournament

Pos	Team	Pld	W	L	Pts	SW	SL	SR	SPW	SPL	SPR	Qualification
1	France	2	2	0	6	6	1	6.000	179	152	1.178	Quarterfinals
2	Croatia	2	1	1	2	3	5	0.600	171	173	0.988	Quarterfinals
3	Algeria	2	0	2	1	3	6	0.500	189	214	0.883	

Date	Time		Score		Set 1	Set 2	Set 3	Set 4	Set 5	Total	Report
24 Jun	11:00	Croatia	3–2	Algeria	25–19	25–17	22–25	23–25	15–12	110–98	P2
25 Jun	11:00	Algeria	1–3	France	31–29	16–25	21–25	23–25		91–104	P2

Women's tournament

Pos	Team	Pld	W	L	Pts	SW	SL	SR	SPW	SPL	SPR	Qualification
1	Slovenia	2	2	0	6	6	0	MAX	150	96	1.563	Quarterfinals
2	Portugal	2	1	1	3	3	3	1.000	135	123	1.098	Quarterfinals
3	Algeria	2	0	2	0	0	6	0.000	84	150	0.560	

Date	Time		Score		Set 1	Set 2	Set 3	Set 4	Set 5	Total	Report
23 Jun	16:00	Algeria	0–3	Slovenia	10–25	16–25	10–25	–		36–75	P2
25 Jun	19:00	Algeria	0–3	Portugal	7–25	20–25	21–25	–		48–75	P2

== Weightlifting ==
Men

Athlete	Event	Snatch		Clean & Jerk	
Athlete	Event	Result	Rank	Result	Rank
Nafaa Sariak	−69 kg	136	9	—	—
Saddam Messaoui	−94 kg	155	3rd place, bronze medalist(s)	180	4

Women

Athlete	Event	Snatch		Clean & Jerk	
Athlete	Event	Result	Rank	Result	Rank
Meryem Nada Benmiloud	−63 kg	75	6	95	6
Ikram Cherara	−69 kg	80	6	107	7
Bouchra Fatima Hirech	−75 kg	80	7	100	7

== Wrestling ==
Algeria will participate in only eight male wrestlers.

Men's Freestyle

Athlete	Event	Round of 16	Quarterfinal	Semifinal	Repechage 1	Repechage 2	Final / BM	
Athlete	Event	Opposition Result	Opposition Result	Opposition Result	Opposition Result	Opposition Result	Opposition Result	Rank
Fares Lakel	−65 kg	Prizreni (ALB); L 1–5	did not advance					
Mohamed Boudraa	−74 kg	—N/a	Hajdari (ALB); W 9–0	Moustafa (EGY); L 3–9		Bye	Mitrov (MKD); L 1–3	4
Mohammed Fardj	−97 kg	Kaouslidis (CYP); W 9–3	Dede (TUR); L 3–7	did not advance				

Women's Freestyle

Athlete	Event	Round Robin					Semifinal	Final / BM	
Athlete	Event	Opposition Result	Opposition Result	Opposition Result	Opposition Result	Rank	Opposition Result	Opposition Result	Rank
Kheira Chaema Yahiaoui	−50 kg	Ghazy (EGY); W 7–3	Gorria Goñi (ESP); L 4–16	—N/a		2 Q	Demirhan (TUR); L 0–10	Gorria Goñi (ESP); L 0–8	4
Chaimaa Aouissi	−57 kg	Demirkan (GRE); W 9–4	Sanchez Diaz (ESP); L 2–6	Gün (TUR); L 0–10	Rainero (ITA); L 0–8	4	—N/a		

Men's Greco-Roman

Athlete	Event	Round of 16	Quarterfinal	Semifinal	Repechage	Final / BM	
Athlete	Event	Opposition Result	Opposition Result	Opposition Result	Opposition Result	Opposition Result	Rank
Abdenour Laouni	−60 kg	Cabral (POR); W 9–0	Aghazaryan (ESP); W 5–0	Ali (TUR); L 0–9	—N/a	Tudezca (FRA); L 4–6	4
Ishak Gaiou	−67 kg	Fris (SRB); L 1–2	Did not advance				
Akrem Boudjemline	−77 kg	Hassan Gomaa (EGY); L 2–10	Did not advance				
Bachir Sid Azara	−87 kg	Bye	Tsekeridis (GRE); W 3–2	Huklek (CRO); W 8–5	Bye	Başar (TUR); L 1–2	2nd place, silver medalist(s)
Adem Boudjemline	−97 kg	—N/a		Hassan Aly (EGY); W 4–2	Bye	Noumonvi (FRA); L 1–4	2nd place, silver medalist(s)
