= Judo at the 2018 Mediterranean Games – Men's 66 kg =

Judo competition

Men's 66 kg at the 2018 Mediterranean Games
- Venue: Cambrils Pavilion
- Date: 27 June
- Competitors: 13 from 13 nations

Medalists
gold medal	Manuel Lombardo	Italy
silver medal	Alberto Gaitero	Spain
bronze medal	Andraž Jereb	Slovenia
bronze medal	Imad Bassou	Morocco

The men's 66 kg competition in judo at the 2018 Mediterranean Games was held on 27 June at the Cambrils Pavilion in Cambrils.

== Schedule ==
All times are Central European Summer Time (UTC+2).

Date	Time	Round
June 27, 2018	10:48	Round of 16
June 27, 2018	12:08	Quarterfinals
June 27, 2018	12:56	Semifinals
June 27, 2018	14:16	Repechage
June 27, 2018	17:48	Bronze medal
June 27, 2018	17:56	Final

== Results ==
=== Main Round ===
Round of 16
Manuel Lombardo (ITA)	11
Eleftherios Panagiotou (GRE)	00
Houd Zourdani (ALG)	10
Indrit Cullhaj (ALB)	01
Imad Bassou (MAR)	10
Momen Mahfod (SYR)	00
Daniel Jean (FRA)	00
Petar Zadro (BIH)	01
Mohamed Abdelmawgoud (EGY)	10
Christos Trikomitis (CYP)	00

Quarterfinals
Andraž Jereb (SLO)	00
Manuel Lombardo (ITA)	10
Houd Zourdani (ALG)	00
Imad Bassou (MAR)	10
Alberto Gaitero (ESP)	10
Petar Zadro (BIH)	00
Sinan Sandal (TUR)	00
Mohamed Abdelmawgoud (EGY)	10

Semifinals
Manuel Lombardo (ITA)	10
Imad Bassou (MAR)	01
Alberto Gaitero (ESP)	01
Mohamed Abdelmawgoud (EGY)	00

Final
Manuel Lombardo (ITA)	01
Alberto Gaitero (ESP)	00

=== Repechage ===
Repechage 1		Repechage 2		Bronze medal
Eleftherios Panagiotou (GRE)	00
Andraž Jereb (SLO)	10	Andraž Jereb (SLO)	11
Momen Mahfod (SYR)	01	Houd Zourdani (ALG)	00
Houd Zourdani (ALG)	11			Andraž Jereb (SLO)	10
				Mohamed Abdelmawgoud (EGY)	00

Repechage 1		Repechage 2		Bronze medal
		Petar Zadro (BIH)	00
Christos Trikomitis (CYP)	00	Sinan Sandal (TUR)	10
Sinan Sandal (TUR)	10			Sinan Sandal (TUR)	00
				Imad Bassou (MAR)	11
