= Swimming at the 2018 Mediterranean Games – Women's 200 metre individual medley =

Women's 200 metre individual medley at the 2018 Mediterranean Games
- Venue: Campclar Aquatic Center
- Location: Tarragona, Spain
- Dates: 24 June
- Competitors: 13 from 10 nations
- Winning time: 2:11.66

Medalists
gold medal	Mireia Belmonte	Spain
silver medal	Viktoriya Zeynep Güneş	Turkey
bronze medal	Anna Pirovano	Italy

The women's 200 metre individual medley competition at the 2018 Mediterranean Games was held on 24 June 2018 at the Campclar Aquatic Center.

== Records ==
Prior to this competition, the existing world and Mediterranean Games records were as follows:

World record	Katinka Hosszú (HUN)	2:06.12	Kazan, Russia	3 August 2015
Mediterranean Games record	Camille Muffat (FRA)	2:10.36	Pescara, Italy	27 June 2009

== Results ==
=== Heats ===
The heats were held at 09:42.

Rank	Heat	Lane	Name	Nationality	Time	Notes
1	2	4	Mireia Belmonte	Spain	2:14.29	Q
2	2	3	Anja Crevar	Serbia	2:15.40	Q
3	2	5	Viktoriya Zeynep Güneş	Turkey	2:15.60	Q
4	2	2	Beatriz Gómez Cortés	Spain	2:15.74	Q
5	1	3	Anna Pirovano	Italy	2:15.93	Q
6	1	2	Tara Vovk	Slovenia	2:16.24	Q
7	1	4	Carlotta Toni	Italy	2:17.10	Q
8	2	6	Ilektra Lebl	Greece	2:17.41	Q
9	1	5	Victoria Kaminskaya	Portugal	2:18.53	
10	2	7	Inês Fernandes	Portugal	2:22.41	
11	2	1	Lamija Medošević	Bosnia and Herzegovina	2:23.88	
12	1	7	Rania Nefsi	Algeria	2:24.51	
13	1	1	Claudia Verdino	Monaco	2:28.86	
	1	6	Gizem Bozkurt	Turkey	DNS	

=== Final ===
The final was held at 17:37.

Rank	Lane	Name	Nationality	Time	Notes
1st place, gold medalist(s)	4	Mireia Belmonte	Spain	2:11.66	
2nd place, silver medalist(s)	3	Viktoriya Zeynep Güneş	Turkey	2:13.19	
3rd place, bronze medalist(s)	2	Anna Pirovano	Italy	2:13.21	
4	6	Beatriz Gómez Cortés	Spain	2:14.91	
5	5	Anja Crevar	Serbia	2:15.58	
6	1	Carlotta Toni	Italy	2:17.48	
7	7	Tara Vovk	Slovenia	2:17.49	
8	8	Ilektra Lebl	Greece	2:17.71	
