= Boxing at the 2018 Mediterranean Games – Men's welterweight =

Boxing competitions

Men's welterweight boxing at the 2018 Mediterranean Games
- Venue: Torredembarra Pavilion
- Date: 26–30 June 2018
- Competitors: 13 from 13 nations

Medalists
gold medal	Walid Sedik Mohamed	Egypt
silver medal	Youba Sissokho	Spain
bronze medal	Ahmed Tabai	Tunisia
bronze medal	Onur Şipal	Turkey

The men's welterweight competition of the boxing events at the 2018 Mediterranean Games in Tarragona, Spain, was held between June 26 and 30 at the Torredembarra Pavilion.

Like all Mediterranean Games boxing events, the competition was a straight single-elimination tournament. Both semifinal losers were awarded bronze medals, so no boxers competed again after their first loss.

== Schedule ==
All times are Central European Summer Time (UTC+2).

Date	Time	Round
June 26, 2018	19:15 & 20:15	Round of 16
June 28, 2018	18:30 & 19:15	Quarterfinals
June 29, 2018	19:30	Semifinals
June 30, 2018	17:00	Final

== Results ==
=== Bracket ===
Round of 16
Ljuljzim Ismaili (MKD)	1
Abdul Mouen Azziz (SYR)	4
Nasreddine Bensaid (ALG)	2
Youba Sissokho (ESP)	3
Andrej Baković (SLO)	4
Alvin Magny Poaty (FRA)	1
Adem Fetahović (BIH)	4
Petar Cetinić (CRO)	0
Dielli Vranoci (KOS)	3
Francesco Magri (ITA)	2

Quarterfinals
Onur Şipal (TUR)	4
Abdul Mouen Azziz (SYR)	1
Youba Sissokho (ESP)	5
Andrej Baković (SLO)	0
Walid Sedik Mohamed (EGY)	3
Adem Fetahović (BIH)	2
Dielli Vranoci (KOS)	1
Ahmed Tabai (TUN)	4

Semifinals
Onur Şipal (TUR)
Youba Sissokho (ESP)	WO
Walid Sedik Mohamed (EGY)	5
Ahmed Tabai (TUN)	0

Finals
Youba Sissokho (ESP)	1
Walid Sedik Mohamed (EGY)	4
