= Swimming at the 2018 Mediterranean Games – Women's 50 metre backstroke =

Women's 50 metre backstroke at the 2018 Mediterranean Games
- Venue: Campclar Aquatic Center
- Location: Tarragona, Spain
- Dates: 23 June
- Competitors: 15 from 12 nations
- Winning time: 28.33

Medalists
gold medal	Silvia Scalia	Italy
silver medal	Duane Da Rocha	Spain
bronze medal	Theodora Drakou	Greece

The women's 50 metre backstroke competition at the 2018 Mediterranean Games was held on 23 June 2018 at the Campclar Aquatic Center.

== Records ==
Prior to this competition, the existing world and Mediterranean Games records were as follows:

World record	Zhao Jing (CHN)	27.06	Rome, Italy	30 July 2009
Mediterranean Games record	Sanja Jovanović (CRO)	28.48	Mersin, Turkey	21 June 2013

The following records were established during the competition:

Date	Event	Name	Nationality	Time	Record
23 June	Final	Silvia Scalia	Italy	28.33	GR

== Results ==
=== Heats ===
The heats were held at 10:00.

Rank	Heat	Lane	Name	Nationality	Time	Notes
1	2	4	Theodora Drakou	Greece	28.67	Q
2	1	4	Silvia Scalia	Italy	28.69	Q
3	1	5	Duane Da Rocha	Spain	28.94	Q
4	2	6	Ekaterina Avramova	Turkey	29.04	Q
5	1	3	Paloma de Bordóns	Spain	29.17	Q
6	2	5	Tania Quaglieri	Italy	29.28	Q
7	2	3	Camille Gheorghiu	France	29.34	Q
8	1	6	Amel Melih	Algeria	29.69	Q
9	1	2	Sezin Eligül	Turkey	29.86	
10	1	7	Rim Ouenniche	Tunisia	30.17	NR
11	2	1	Katja Fain	Slovenia	30.97	
12	2	2	Inês Fernandes	Portugal	31.14	
13	2	7	Kalia Antoniou	Cyprus	31.32	
14	1	1	Fjorda Shabani	Kosovo	32.17	
15	2	8	Eda Zeqiri	Kosovo	32.36	

=== Final ===
The final was held at 17:56.

Rank	Lane	Name	Nationality	Time	Notes
1st place, gold medalist(s)	5	Silvia Scalia	Italy	28.33	GR
2nd place, silver medalist(s)	3	Duane Da Rocha	Spain	28.57	
3rd place, bronze medalist(s)	4	Theodora Drakou	Greece	28.61	
4	6	Ekaterina Avramova	Turkey	28.74	
5	2	Paloma de Bordóns	Spain	28.87	
6	7	Tania Quaglieri	Italy	28.92	
7	1	Camille Gheorghiu	France	29.35	
8	8	Amel Melih	Algeria	29.41	NR
