= Boxing at the 2018 Mediterranean Games – Men's middleweight =

Boxing competitions

Men's middleweight boxing at the 2018 Mediterranean Games
- Venue: Torredembarra Pavilion
- Date: 25–30 June 2018
- Competitors: 13 from 13 nations

Medalists
gold medal	Ahmad Ghosoun	Syria
silver medal	Salvatore Cavallaro	Italy
bronze medal	Trifun Dašić	Serbia
bronze medal	Bengoro Bamba	France

The men's Middleweight competition of the boxing events at the 2018 Mediterranean Games in Tarragona, Spain, was held between June 26 and 30 at the Torredembarra Pavilion.

Like all Mediterranean Games boxing events, the competition was a straight single-elimination tournament. Both semifinal losers were awarded bronze medals, so no boxers competed again after their first loss.

== Schedule ==
All times are Central European Summer Time (UTC+2).

Date	Time	Round
June 25, 2018	16:00	Round of 16
June 27, 2018	18:30	Quarterfinals
June 29, 2018	16:00	Semifinals
June 30, 2018	16:30	Final

== Results ==
=== Bracket ===
Round of 16
Trifun Dašić (SRB)	3
Ahmed Abdelmoneim (EGY)	0
Aljaž Venko (SLO)	0
Ahmad Ghosoun (SYR)	4
Arjon Kajoshi (ALB)
Azzouz Boudia (ALG)	RSC
Radenko Tomic (BIH)	0
Bengoro Bamba (FRA)	5
Pavlos Tsagkrakos (GRE)	2
Erol Özkal (TUR)	3

Quarterfinals
Andreas Kokkinos (CYP)	1
Trifun Dašić (SRB)	4
Ahmad Ghosoun (SYR)	5
Azzouz Boudia (ALG)	0
Miguel Cuadrado (ESP)	2
Bengoro Bamba (FRA)	3
Erol Özkal (TUR)	1
Salvatore Cavallaro (ITA)	4

Semifinals
Trifun Dašić (SRB)	0
Ahmad Ghosoun (SYR)	5
Bengoro Bamba (FRA)	1
Salvatore Cavallaro (ITA)	4

Finals
Ahmad Ghosoun (SYR)	4
Salvatore Cavallaro (ITA)	1
