= Canoeing at the 2018 Mediterranean Games – Men's K-1 500 metres =

Men's canoe sprint K-1 500 metres at the 2018 Mediterranean Games
- Venue: Canal Olímpic de Catalunya
- Date: 23–24 June
- Competitors: 13 from 13 nations
- Winning time: 1:38.881

Medalists
gold medal	Roi Rodríguez	Spain
silver medal	Fernando Pimenta	Portugal
bronze medal	Guillaume Burger	France

The men's canoe sprint K-1 500 metres at the 2018 Mediterranean Games in Tarragona took place between 23 and 24 June at the Canal Olímpic de Catalunya.

== Schedule ==
All times are Spain time (UTC+02:00)

Date	Time	Round
Saturday, 23 June 2018	09:20; 12:10	Heats; Semifinal
Sunday, 24 June 2018	10:10	Final

== Results ==
=== Heats ===
==== Heat 1 ====
Rank	Canoer	Country	Time	Notes
1	Roi Rodríguez	Spain	1:39.053	QF
2	Stefan Vekić	Serbia	1:39.961	QF
3	Alessandro Gnecchi	Italy	1:40.071	QF
4	Konstant Efthymiadis	Greece	1:46.856	QS
5	Mohamed Ali Mrabet	Tunisia	1:51.251	QS
6	Ali Ahmed	Egypt	1:51.681	QS
7	Darko Savić	Bosnia and Herzegovina	1:58.771 Q	QS

==== Heat 2 ====
Rank	Canoer	Country	Time	Notes
1	Fernando Pimenta	Portugal	1:38.812	QF
2	Guillaume Burger	France	1:38.953	QF
3	Antun Novaković	Croatia	1:39.584	QF
4	Simon Blažević	Slovenia	1:41.198	QS
5	Engin Erkan	Turkey	1:43.342	QS
6	Samir Laouar	Algeria	1:54.937	QS

=== Semifinal ===
Rank	Canoer	Country	Time	Notes
1	Mohamed Ali Mrabet	Tunisia	1:40.821	QF
2	Simon Blažević	Slovenia	1:41.140	QF
3	Engin Erkan	Turkey	1:41.343	QF
4	Konstant Efthymiadis	Greece	1:43.968	
5	Ali Ahmed	Egypt	1:50.577	
6	Darko Savić	Bosnia and Herzegovina	1:50.936	
7	Samir Laouar	Algeria	1:51.907	

=== Final ===
Rank	Canoer	Country	Time
1st place, gold medalist(s)	Roi Rodríguez	Spain (ESP)	1:38.881
2nd place, silver medalist(s)	Fernando Pimenta	Portugal (POR)	1:39.574
3rd place, bronze medalist(s)	Guillaume Burger	France (FRA)	1:39.767
4	Alessandro Gnecchi	Italy (ITA)	1:40.348
5	Antun Novaković	Croatia (CRO)	1:40.914
6	Stefan Vekić	Serbia (SRB)	1:41.256
7	Simon Blažević	Slovenia (SLO)	1:42.242
8	Engin Erkan	Turkey (TUR)	1:44.595
9	Mohamed Ali Mrabet	Tunisia (TUN)	1:45.803

QF=Qualified for final, QS=Qualified for semifinal
