= Judo at the 2018 Mediterranean Games – Women's 78 kg =

Judo competitions

Women's 78 kg at the 2018 Mediterranean Games
- Venue: Cambrils Pavilion
- Date: 29 June
- Competitors: 8 from 8 nations

Medalists
gold medal	Giorgia Stangherlin	Italy
silver medal	Loriana Kuka	Kosovo
bronze medal	Patricija Brolih	Slovenia
bronze medal	Patrícia Sampaio	Portugal

The women's 78 kg competition in judo at the 2018 Mediterranean Games was held on 29 June at the Cambrils Pavilion in Cambrils.

== Schedule ==
All times are Central European Summer Time (UTC+2).

Date	Time	Round
June 29, 2018	10:40	Quarterfinals
June 29, 2018	11:44	Semifinals
June 29, 2018	13:20	Repechage
June 29, 2018	17:00	Bronze medal
June 29, 2018	17:08	Final

== Results ==
=== Main Round ===
Quarterfinals
Kaouthar Ouallal (ALG)	00
Giorgia Stangherlin (ITA)	01
Chloé Buttigieg (FRA)	00
Patrícia Sampaio (POR)	10
Sarra Mzougui (TUN)	00
Patricija Brolih (SLO)	10
Loriana Kuka (KOS)	10
Laia Talarn (ESP)	00

Semifinals
Giorgia Stangherlin (ITA)	10
Patrícia Sampaio (POR)	01
Patricija Brolih (SLO)	00
Loriana Kuka (KOS)	01

Finals
Giorgia Stangherlin (ITA)	01
Loriana Kuka (KOS)	00

=== Repechage ===
Repechage 2		Bronze medal
Kaouthar Ouallal (ALG)	01
Chloé Buttigieg (FRA)	00	Kaouthar Ouallal (ALG)	00
		Patricija Brolih (SLO)	10

Repechage 2		Bronze medal
Sarra Mzougui (TUN)	00
Laia Talarn (ESP)	10	Laia Talarn (ESP)	00
		Patrícia Sampaio (POR)	01
