= Swimming at the 2018 Mediterranean Games – Women's 100 metre backstroke =

Women's 100 metre backstroke at the 2018 Mediterranean Games
- Venue: Campclar Aquatic Center
- Location: Tarragona, Spain
- Dates: 24 June
- Competitors: 11 from 8 nations
- Winning time: 1:00.74

Medalists
gold medal	Margherita Panziera	Italy
silver medal	Silvia Scalia	Italy
bronze medal	Ekaterina Avramova	Turkey

The women's 100 metre backstroke competition at the 2018 Mediterranean Games was held on 24 June 2018 at the Campclar Aquatic Center.

== Records ==
Prior to this competition, the existing world and Mediterranean Games records were as follows:

World record	Kylie Masse (CAN)	58.10	Rome, Italy	25 July 2017
Mediterranean Games record	Elena Gemo (ITA)	1:01.57	Mersin, Turkey	24 June 2013

The following records were established during the competition:

Date	Event	Name	Nationality	Time	Record
24 June	Heats	Margherita Panziera	Italy	1:00.70	GR

== Results ==
=== Heats ===
The heats were held at 10:08.

Rank	Heat	Lane	Name	Nationality	Time	Notes
1	2	4	Margherita Panziera	Italy	1:00.70	Q, GR
2	1	3	Ekaterina Avramova	Turkey	1:01.66	Q
3	2	6	Paloma de Bordóns	Spain	1:02.01	Q
4	1	5	Duane Da Rocha	Spain	1:02.27	Q
5	2	5	Silvia Scalia	Italy	1:02.47	Q
6	2	3	Theodora Drakou	Greece	1:02.69	Q
7	1	4	Camille Gheorghiu	France	1:04.00	Q
8	1	6	Rim Ouenniche	Tunisia	1:05.96	Q
9	2	2	Mónica Ramírez	Andorra	1:06.42	
10	1	2	Fjorda Shabani	Kosovo	1:07.69	
11	2	7	Eda Zeqiri	Kosovo	1:09.42	

=== Final ===
The final was held at 18:35.

Rank	Lane	Name	Nationality	Time	Notes
1st place, gold medalist(s)	4	Margherita Panziera	Italy	1:00.74	
2nd place, silver medalist(s)	2	Silvia Scalia	Italy	1:00.99	
3rd place, bronze medalist(s)	5	Ekaterina Avramova	Turkey	1:01.16	
4	6	Duane Da Rocha	Spain	1:01.40	
5	7	Theodora Drakou	Greece	1:02.53	
6	3	Paloma de Bordóns	Spain	1:02.70	
7	1	Camille Gheorghiu	France	1:03.45	
8	8	Rim Ouenniche	Tunisia	1:04.92	
