= 2021 African Judo Championships – Women's 57 kg =

Judo competition

Judo Women's 57 kg at the 2021 African Judo Championships
- Venue: Dakar Arena
- Location: Dakar, Senegal
- Date: 20 May 2021
- Competitors: 12 from 11 nations

Medalists
gold medal	Ghofran Khelifi	Tunisia
silver medal	Donne Breytenbach	South Africa
bronze medal	Zouleiha Abzetta Dabonne	Ivory Coast
bronze medal	Yamina Halata	Algeria

Competition at external databases
- Links: IJF • JudoInside

The women's 57 kg competition in at the 2021 African Judo Championships was held on 20 May at the Dakar Arena in Dakar, Senegal.

== Results ==
=== Main Round ===
Round of 16
Ndeye Kamara (SEN)	10
Siobhan Esterhuysen (RSA)	00
Yamina Halata (ALG)	10
Annociatte Iradukunda (BDI)	00
Donne Breytenbach (RSA)	10
Esther Wanjiru (KEN)	00
Sandra Borges (CPV)	00
Yousra El Bouhairi (MAR)	11

Quarterfinals
Ghofran Khelifi (TUN)	01
Ndeye Kamara (SEN)	00
Narindra Rakotovao (MAD)	00
Yamina Halata (ALG)	10
Diassonema Mucungui (ANG)	00
Donne Breytenbach (RSA)	10
Zouleiha Abzetta Dabonne (CIV)	10
Yousra El Bouhairi (MAR)	00

Semifinals
Ghofran Khelifi (TUN)	11
Yamina Halata (ALG)	00
Donne Breytenbach (RSA)	10
Zouleiha Abzetta Dabonne (CIV)	00

Final
Ghofran Khelifi (TUN)	10
Donne Breytenbach (RSA)	00

=== Repechage ===
Repechage		Bronze medal
Ndeye Kamara (SEN)	11
Narindra Rakotovao (MAD)	00	Ndeye Kamara (SEN)	00
		Zouleiha Abzetta Dabonne (CIV)	10

Repechage		Bronze medal
Diassonema Mucungui (ANG)	10
Yousra El Bouhairi (MAR)	00	Diassonema Mucungui (ANG)	00
		Yamina Halata (ALG)	10
