= Swimming at the 2018 Mediterranean Games – Men's 50 metre freestyle =

Men's 50 metre freestyle at the 2018 Mediterranean Games
- Venue: Campclar Aquatic Center
- Location: Tarragona, Spain
- Dates: 25 June 2018
- Competitors: 20 from 12 nations
- Winning time: 21.66

Medalists
gold medal	Kristian Golomeev	Greece
silver medal	Oussama Sahnoune	Algeria
bronze medal	Ali Khalafalla	Egypt

The men's 50 metre freestyle competition at the 2018 Mediterranean Games was held on 25 June 2018 at the Campclar Aquatic Center.

== Records ==
Prior to this competition, the existing world and Mediterranean Games records were as follows:

World record	César Cielo (BRA)	20.91	São Paulo, Brazil	18 December 2009
Mediterranean Games record	Frédérick Bousquet (FRA)	21.17	Pescara, Italy	28 June 2009

== Results ==
=== Heats ===
The heats were held at 09:30.

Rank	Heat	Lane	Name	Nationality	Time	Notes
1	3	5	Ali Khalafalla	Egypt	22.05	Q, NR
2	2	5	Oussama Sahnoune	Algeria	22.16	Q
3	3	4	Kristian Golomeev	Greece	22.37	Q
4	2	4	Andrea Vergani	Italy	22.51	Q
5	1	3	Andrej Barna	Serbia	22.57	Q
6	1	4	Luca Dotto	Italy	22.58	Q
7	3	3	Juan Segura	Spain	22.79	Q
8	3	7	Nikola Bjelajac	Bosnia and Herzegovina	22.96	Q
9	1	6	Hüseyin Emre Sakçı	Turkey	22.97	
10	2	3	Abdelrahman Elaraby	Egypt	22.99	
11	1	2	Uroš Nikolić	Serbia	23.12	
12	3	2	Adi Mešetović	Bosnia and Herzegovina	23.19	
13	2	6	Yalım Acımış	Turkey	23.21	
14	3	8	Souhail Hamouchane	Morocco	23.29	
15	3	6	Fotios Koliopoulos	Greece	23.49	
16	2	7	Omiros Zagkas	Cyprus	23.62	
17	2	2	Marcos García	Spain	23.74	
18	1	7	Anthony Barbar	Lebanon	23.87	
19	3	1	Vangelis Zorbis	Cyprus	24.10	
20	2	1	Dren Ukimeraj	Kosovo	26.09	
	1	1	Audai Hassouna	Libya	DNS	

=== Final ===
The final was held at 17:30.

Rank	Lane	Name	Nationality	Time	Notes
1st place, gold medalist(s)	3	Kristian Golomeev	Greece	21.66	NR
2nd place, silver medalist(s)	5	Oussama Sahnoune	Algeria	21.96	NR
3rd place, bronze medalist(s)	4	Ali Khalafalla	Egypt	21.97	NR
4	6	Andrea Vergani	Italy	22.13	
4	7	Luca Dotto	Italy	22.13	
6	1	Juan Segura	Spain	22.44	
7	2	Andrej Barna	Serbia	22.60	
8	8	Nikola Bjelajac	Bosnia and Herzegovina	22.84	=NR
