= Boxing at the 2018 Mediterranean Games – Men's lightweight =

Boxing competitions

Men's lightweight boxing at the 2018 Mediterranean Games
- Venue: Torredembarra Pavilion
- Date: 25–30 June
- Competitors: 9 from 9 nations

Medalists
gold medal	Sofiane Oumiha	France
silver medal	Hakan Doğan	Turkey
bronze medal	Alaa Shili	Tunisia
bronze medal	Reda Benbaziz	Algeria

The men's lightweight competition of the boxing events at the 2018 Mediterranean Games in Tarragona, Spain, was held between June 25 and 30 at the Torredembarra Pavilion.

Like all Mediterranean Games boxing events, the competition was a straight single-elimination tournament. Both semifinal losers were awarded bronze medals, so no boxers competed again after their first loss.

== Schedule ==
All times are Central European Summer Time (UTC+2).

Date	Time	Round
June 25, 2018	16:54	Round of 16
June 27, 2018	17:00	Quarterfinals
June 29, 2018	19:00	Semifinals
June 30, 2018	16:30	Final

== Results ==
=== Bracket ===
Round of 16
Driss Khallouk (MAR)	4
Essam Amen (EGY)	1

Quarterfinals
Hakan Doğan (TUR)	4
Driss Khallouk (MAR)	1
Francesco Iozia (ITA)	1
Reda Benbaziz (ALG)	4
Sofiane Oumiha (FRA)	5
Violant Syejmani (KOS)	0
Salvador Jiménez (ESP)	2
Alaa Shili (TUN)	3

Semifinals
Hakan Doğan (TUR)	4
Reda Benbaziz (ALG)	1
Sofiane Oumiha (FRA)	5
Alaa Shili (TUN)	0

Final
Hakan Doğan (TUR)	0
Sofiane Oumiha (FRA)	5
