= Judo at the 2018 Mediterranean Games – Men's +100 kg =

Judo competitions

Men's +100 kg at the 2018 Mediterranean Games
- Venue: Cambrils Pavilion
- Date: 29 June
- Competitors: 13 from 13 nations

Medalists
| gold medal | Žarko Ćulum | Serbia |
| silver medal | Vincenzo D'Arco | Italy |
| bronze medal | Faicel Jaballah | Tunisia |
| bronze medal | Ángel Parra | Spain |

The men's +100 kg competition in judo at the 2018 Mediterranean Games was held on 29 June at the Cambrils Pavilion in Cambrils.

== Schedule ==
All times are Central European Summer Time (UTC+2).

| Date | Time | Round |
|---|---|---|
| June 29, 2018 | 10:00 | Round of 16 |
| June 29, 2018 | 11:12 | Quarterfinals |
| June 29, 2018 | 12:00 | Semifinals |
| June 29, 2018 | 12:48 | Repechage |
| June 29, 2018 | 17:48 | Bronze medal |
| June 29, 2018 | 17:56 | Final |

== Results ==
=== Main Round ===
Round of 16
Ángel Parra (ESP) | 10
Marvin Gadeau (MON) | 00
Mohamed-Amine Tayeb (ALG) | 00
Vincenzo D'Arco (ITA) | 10
Hamza Ouchani (FRA) | 00
Feyyaz Yazıcı (TUR) | 01
Vito Dragič (SLO) | 10
Diogo Silva (POR) | 00
Mustapha Abdallaoui (MAR) | 00
Dimitrios Tsoumitas (GRE) | 10

Quarterfinals
Faicel Jaballah (TUN) | 00
Ángel Parra (ESP) | 10
Vincenzo D'Arco (ITA) | 10
Feyyaz Yazıcı (TUR) | 00
Žarko Ćulum (SRB) | 10
Vito Dragič (SLO) | 00
Harun Sadiković (BIH) | 10
Dimitrios Tsoumitas (GRE) | 00

Semifinals
Ángel Parra (ESP) | 00
Vincenzo D'Arco (ITA) | 01
Žarko Ćulum (SRB) | 01
Harun Sadiković (BIH) | 00

Final
Vincenzo D'Arco (ITA) | 00
Žarko Ćulum (SRB) | 10

=== Repechage ===
| Repechage 1 | | Repechage 2 | | Bronze medal |
| Marvin Gadeau (MON) | 00 |
| Faicel Jaballah (TUN) | 10 | Faicel Jaballah (TUN) | 10 |
| Mohamed-Amine Tayeb (ALG) | 10 | Mohamed-Amine Tayeb (ALG) | 00 |
| Feyyaz Yazıcı (TUR) | 00 | | | Faicel Jaballah (TUN) | 10 |
| | | | | Harun Sadiković (BIH) | 00 |

| Repechage 1 | Repechage 2 | | Bronze medal |
| | Vito Dragič (SLO) | 10 |
| | Dimitrios Tsoumitas (GRE) | 01 |
| | | | Vito Dragič (SLO) | 00 |
| | | | Ángel Parra (ESP) | 10 |
