= Swimming at the 2018 Mediterranean Games – Men's 400 metre freestyle =

Men's 400 metre freestyle at the 2018 Mediterranean Games
- Venue: Campclar Aquatic Center
- Location: Tarragona, Spain
- Dates: 25 June
- Competitors: 18 from 13 nations
- Winning time: 3:46.29

Medalists
| gold medal | Gregorio Paltrinieri | Italy |
| silver medal | Domenico Acerenza | Italy |
| bronze medal | Marwan Elkamash | Egypt |

The men's 400 metre freestyle competition at the 2018 Mediterranean Games was held on 25 June 2018 at the Campclar Aquatic Center.

== Records ==
Prior to this competition, the existing world and Mediterranean Games records were as follows:

| World record | Paul Biedermann (GER) | 3:40.07 | Rome, Italy | 26 July 2009 |
| Mediterranean Games record | Oussama Mellouli (TUN) | 3:42.71 | Pescara, Italy | 27 June 2009 |

== Results ==
=== Heats ===
The heats were held at 10:17.

| Rank | Heat | Lane | Name | Nationality | Time | Notes |
|---|---|---|---|---|---|---|
| 1 | 2 | 4 | Marwan Elkamash | Egypt | 3:51.98 | Q |
| 2 | 3 | 4 | Domenico Acerenza | Italy | 3:52.41 | Q |
| 3 | 3 | 6 | Gregorio Paltrinieri | Italy | 3:52.43 | Q |
| 4 | 2 | 2 | Mohamed Agili | Tunisia | 3:53.23 | Q |
| 5 | 3 | 2 | Marcos Rodríguez | Spain | 3:53.55 | Q |
| 6 | 3 | 3 | Dimitrios Dimitriou | Greece | 3:53.64 | Q |
| 7 | 3 | 5 | Miguel Durán | Spain | 3:54.05 | Q |
| 8 | 2 | 5 | Martin Bau | Slovenia | 3:55.05 | Q |
| 9 | 2 | 3 | Joris Bouchaut | France | 3:56.25 | |
| 10 | 2 | 6 | Dimitrios Negris | Greece | 3:56.42 | |
| 11 | 2 | 8 | Efe Turan | Turkey | 3:56.64 | |
| 12 | 2 | 7 | Miguel Nascimento | Portugal | 3:58.48 | |
| 13 | 3 | 8 | Mohamed Djaballah | Algeria | 4:02.56 | |
| 14 | 1 | 4 | Tomás Veloso | Portugal | 4:03.85 | |
| 15 | 1 | 5 | Marko Kovačić | Bosnia and Herzegovina | 4:04.07 | |
| 16 | 3 | 7 | Jonathan Atsu | France | 4:06.16 | |
| 17 | 3 | 1 | Constantinos Hadjittooulis | Cyprus | 4:08.54 | |
| 18 | 1 | 3 | Franci Aleksi | Albania | 4:13.04 | |
| | 2 | 1 | Erge Can Gezmiş | Turkey | DNS | |

=== Final ===
The final was held at 18:52.

| Rank | Lane | Name | Nationality | Time | Notes |
|---|---|---|---|---|---|
| 1st place, gold medalist(s) | 3 | Gregorio Paltrinieri | Italy | 3:46.29 | |
| 2nd place, silver medalist(s) | 5 | Domenico Acerenza | Italy | 3:47.50 | |
| 3rd place, bronze medalist(s) | 4 | Marwan Elkamash | Egypt | 3:47.51 | |
| 4 | 6 | Mohamed Agili | Tunisia | 3:52.54 | |
| 5 | 1 | Miguel Durán | Spain | 3:53.88 | |
| 6 | 2 | Marcos Rodríguez | Spain | 3:54.51 | |
| 7 | 8 | Martin Bau | Slovenia | 3:54.82 | |
| 8 | 7 | Dimitrios Dimitriou | Greece | 3:55.27 | |
