= Swimming at the 2018 Mediterranean Games – Men's 100 metre freestyle =

Men's 100 metre freestyle at the 2018 Mediterranean Games
- Venue: Campclar Aquatic Center
- Location: Tarragona, Spain
- Dates: 24 June
- Competitors: 22 from 13 nations
- Winning time: 48.00

Medalists
gold medal	Oussama Sahnoune	Algeria
silver medal	Alessandro Miressi	Italy
bronze medal	Luca Dotto	Italy

The men's 100 metre freestyle competition at the 2018 Mediterranean Games was held on 24 June 2018 at the Campclar Aquatic Center.

== Records ==
Prior to this competition, the existing world and Mediterranean Games records were as follows:

World record	César Cielo (BRA)	46.91	Rome, Italy	30 July 2009
Mediterranean Games record	Alain Bernard (FRA)	47.83	Pescara, Italy	29 June 2009

== Results ==
=== Heats ===
The heats were held at 09:48.

Rank	Heat	Lane	Name	Nationality	Time	Notes
1	3	4	Alessandro Miressi	Italy	49.01	Q
2	3	5	Oussama Sahnoune	Algeria	49.03	Q
3	2	5	Ali Khalafalla	Egypt	49.10	Q, NR
4	2	4	Velimir Stjepanović	Serbia	49.40	Q
5	1	4	Luca Dotto	Italy	49.77	Q
6	1	3	Moritz Berg	Spain	49.84	Q
7	3	3	Andrej Barna	Serbia	49.96	Q
8	2	6	Oskitz Aguilar	Spain	50.18	Q
9	1	6	Kemal Arda Gürdal	Turkey	50.30	
10	2	2	Nikola Bjelajac	Bosnia and Herzegovina	50.47	
11	3	2	Yalım Acımış	Turkey	50.71	
12	3	6	Fotios Koliopoulos	Greece	51.26	
13	1	2	Georgios Spanoudakis	Greece	51.31	
14	2	3	Jonathan Atsu	France	51.37	
15	3	7	Omar Eltonbary	Egypt	51.92	
16	1	5	Miguel Nascimento	Portugal	52.16	
17	3	1	Marko Kovačić	Bosnia and Herzegovina	52.63	
18	2	8	Souhail Hamouchane	Morocco	52.84	
19	2	7	Omiros Zagkas	Cyprus	52.99	
20	1	7	Sebastian Konnaris	Cyprus	53.12	
21	3	8	Dion Kadriu	Kosovo	56.49	
22	1	1	Dren Ukimeraj	Kosovo	56.58	
	2	1	Audai Hassouna	Libya	DNS	

=== Final ===
The final was held at 17:42.

Rank	Lane	Name	Nationality	Time	Notes
1st place, gold medalist(s)	5	Oussama Sahnoune	Algeria	48.00	NR
2nd place, silver medalist(s)	4	Alessandro Miressi	Italy	48.56	
3rd place, bronze medalist(s)	2	Luca Dotto	Italy	49.20	
4	6	Velimir Stjepanović	Serbia	49.47	
5	3	Ali Khalafalla	Egypt	49.66	
6	1	Andrej Barna	Serbia	49.69	
7	7	Moritz Berg	Spain	49.79	
8	8	Oskitz Aguilar	Spain	50.21	
