= Judo at the 2018 Mediterranean Games – Women's 57 kg =

Judo competitions

Women's 57 kg at the 2018 Mediterranean Games
- Venue: Cambrils Pavilion
- Date: 27 June
- Competitors: 11 from 11 nations

Medalists
gold medal	Nora Gjakova	Kosovo
silver medal	Miriam Boi	Italy
bronze medal	Priscilla Gneto	France
bronze medal	Ghofran Khelifi	Tunisia

The women's 57 kg competition in judo at the 2018 Mediterranean Games was held on 27 June at the Cambrils Pavilion in Cambrils.

== Schedule ==
All times are Central European Summer Time (UTC+2).

Date	Time	Round
June 27, 2018	10:32	Round of 16
June 27, 2018	11:52	Quarterfinals
June 27, 2018	12:56	Semifinals
June 27, 2018	14:08	Repechage
June 27, 2018	18:04	Bronze medal
June 27, 2018	18:12	Final

== Results ==
=== Main Round ===
Round of 16
Tena Šikić (CRO)	10
Aurora Shkoza (ALB)	00
Miriam Boi (ITA)	10
Marica Perišić (SRB)	00
Yamina Halata (ALG)	10
Nazlıcan Özerler (TUR)	00

Quarterfinals
Nora Gjakova (KOS)	10
Tena Šikić (CRO)	00
Ghofran Khelifi (TUN)	10
Priscilla Gneto (FRA)	00
Soumiya Iraoui (MAR)	00
Miriam Boi (ITA)	01
Jaione Equísoain (ESP)	10
Yamina Halata (ALG)	01

Semifinals
Nora Gjakova (KOS)	10
Ghofran Khelifi (TUN)	00
Miriam Boi (ITA)	11
Jaione Equísoain (ESP)	00

Final
Nora Gjakova (KOS)	10
Miriam Boi (ITA)	00

=== Repechage ===
Repechage 1	Repechage 2		Bronze medal
	Tena Šikić (CRO)	00
	Priscilla Gneto (FRA)	10
			Priscilla Gneto (FRA)	10
			Jaione Equísoain (ESP)	00

Repechage 1		Repechage 2		Bronze medal
Marica Perišić (SRB)	00
Soumiya Iraoui (MAR)	01	Soumiya Iraoui (MAR)	01
		Yamina Halata (ALG)	00
				Soumiya Iraoui (MAR)	00
				Ghofran Khelifi (TUN)	10
