= Boxing at the 2022 Mediterranean Games – Men's light welterweight =

Boxing competitions

Men's light welterweight boxing at the 2022 Mediterranean Games
- Venue: EMEC Hall
- Date: 26 June – 1 July
- Competitors: 11 from 11 nations

Medalists
gold medal	Yahia Abdelli	Algeria
silver medal	Gianluigi Malanga	Italy
bronze medal	Shpetim Bajoku	Kosovo
bronze medal	Abdelhaq Nadir	Morocco

The men's light welterweight (63 kg) competition of the boxing events at the 2022 Mediterranean Games in Oran, Algeria, was held from 26 June to 1 July at the EMEC Hall.

Like all Mediterranean Games boxing events, the competition was a straight single-elimination tournament. Both semifinal losers were awarded bronze medals, so no boxers competed again after their first loss.

== Results ==
Round of 16
Abdelhaq Nadir (MAR)	3
Nik Nikolov Veber (SLO)	0
Kerem Özmen (TUR)	RSC
Luka Veljović (BIH)
Abdesalem Sassi (TUN)	0
Shpetim Bajoku (KOS)	3

Quarterfinals
Semiz Aličić (SRB)	0
Abdelhaq Nadir (MAR)	3
Alexandros Christodoulou (CYP)	0
Gianluigi Malanga (ITA)	3
Yahia Abdelli (ALG)	2
Kerem Özmen (TUR)	1
Shpetim Bajoku (KOS)	3
Essam Amen (EGY)	0

Semifinals
Abdelhaq Nadir (MAR)	0
Gianluigi Malanga (ITA)	3
Yahia Abdelli (ALG)	2
Shpetim Bajoku (KOS)	1

Final
Gianluigi Malanga (ITA)	0
Yahia Abdelli (ALG)	3
