= Boxing at the 2018 Mediterranean Games – Men's light welterweight =

Boxing competitions

Men's light welterweight boxing at the 2018 Mediterranean Games
- Venue: Torredembarra Pavilion
- Date: 26–30 June 2018
- Competitors: 13 from 13 nations

Medalists
gold medal	Tuğrulhan Erdemir	Turkey
silver medal	Abdelhaq Nadir	Morocco
bronze medal	Johan Orozco	Spain
bronze medal	Alexandros Tsanikidis	Greece

The men's light welterweight competition of the boxing events at the 2018 Mediterranean Games in Tarragona, Spain, was held between June 25 and 30 at the Torredembarra Pavilion.

Like all Mediterranean Games boxing events, the competition was a straight single-elimination tournament. Both semifinal losers were awarded bronze medals, so no boxers competed again after their first loss.

== Schedule ==
All times are Central European Summer Time (UTC+2).

Date	Time	Round
June 26, 2018	16:02	Round of 16
June 28, 2018	17:00	Quarterfinals
June 29, 2018	16:30	Semifinals
June 30, 2018	16:45	Final

== Results ==
=== Bracket ===
Round of 16
Haris Mešanović (BIH)	0
Johan Orozco (ESP)	5
Damjan Grmusa (SRB)	1
Chemseddine Kramou (ALG)	4
Mohamed Kherim Musatat (SYR)	1
Tuğrulhan Erdemir (TUR)	4
Yanis Mehah (FRA)	5
Hugo Micallef (MON)	0
Alexandros Tsanikidis (GRE)	5
Patriot Behrami (KOS)	0

Quarterfinals
Ahmed Mejri (TUN)	0
Johan Orozco (ESP)	5
Chemseddine Kramou (ALG)	0
Tuğrulhan Erdemir (TUR)	5
Abdelhaq Nadir (MAR)	3
Yanis Mehah (FRA)	2
Alexandros Tsanikidis (GRE)	5
Eslam Mohamed (EGY)	0

Semifinals
Johan Orozco (ESP)	0
Tuğrulhan Erdemir (TUR)	5
Abdelhaq Nadir (MAR)	3
Alexandros Tsanikidis (GRE)	2

Final
Tuğrulhan Erdemir (TUR)	5
Abdelhaq Nadir (MAR)	0
