= Tuğrulhan Erdemir =

Turkish boxer (born 1999)

Personal information
- Born: 3 January 1999 (age 27) Kars, Turkey
- Height: 1.80 m (5 ft 11 in)
- Weight: Light middleweight

Boxing career
Medal record
Men's amateur boxing
Representing Turkey
European Championships
Bronze medal – third place	2024 Belgrade	Light middleweight
European Games
Bronze medal – third place	2023 Kraków	Light middleweight
Mediterranean Games
Gold medal – first place	2018 Tarragona	Light welterweight
European U22 Championships
Silver medal – second place	2018 Targu Jiu	Light welterweight
Silver medal – second place	2019 Vladikavkaz	Light welterweight
World Junior Championships
Gold medal – first place	2016 Petersburg	Light middleweight
World Youth Championships
Gold medal – first place	2015 Petersburg	Light welterweight

Tuğrulhan Erdemir (born 3 January 1999) is a Turkish boxer competing in the light middleweight (71 kg) division.

== Boxing career ==
Tuğrulhan Erdemir won the silver medal in the 64 kg category at the 2017 U22 European Championships in Târgu Jiu, Romania. Kosovar Patriot Behrami defeated Russian Pavel Fedorov, Romanian Vasile Suciu and Italian Francesco Iozia 5–0 to reach the final, where he lost to Georgian Lasha Guruli 4–1. He won the silver medal at the 2019 U22 European Championships in Vladikavkaz, Russia, losing 4–1 to Russian Alan Abayev in the final. He had reached the final after beating Welshman Michael McDonagh 4–1, Italian Gianluigi Malanga 5-0 and Petr Novák 5–0.

He won the gold medal at the 2018 Mediterranean Games held at Torredembarra Pavilion in Tarragona, Spain by defeating Moroccan Abdelhaq Nadir in the men's 64 kg final.

At the 3rd European Games held at Nowy Targ Arena in Nowy Targ, Poland, in the men's light middleweight category, after passing the first round, he reached the semifinals by beating Moldovan Davron Bozorov 5–0 in the second round, Ukrainian Yurii Zakharieiev 3–2 in the third round, and Magomed Schachidov of Germany 5–0 in the quarterfinals. In the semifinal against Nikolai Terteryan, competing for Denmark, he was unable to compete due to a rib injury and won the bronze medal. He won a quota for the 2024 Summer Olympics.

Remove from Boxing at the 2024 Summer Olympics – Men's 71 kg because of doping test.
