= Abdelhaq Nadir =

Moroccan boxer (born 1993)

Personal information
- Nationality: Moroccan
- Born: 15 June 1993 (age 33)

Sport
- Sport: Boxing
Medal record
Men's amateur boxing
Representing Morocco
Mediterranean Games
Silver medal – second place	2018 Tarragona	Light welterweight
Bronze medal – third place	2022 Oran	Light welterweight
Bronze medal – third place	2026 Taranto	Welterweight

Abdelhaq Nadir (Arabic: عبد الحق ندير; born 15 June 1993) is a Moroccan boxer, who has represented his country in international events. He competed in the men's lightweight event at the 2020 Summer Olympics.
