= Žarko Ćulum =

Serbian judoka (born 1996)

Personal information
- Nationality: Serbian
- Born: 2 January 1996 (age 30) Banja Luka, Bosnia and Herzegovina
- Occupation: Judoka

Sport
- Country: Serbia
- Sport: Judo
- Weight class: +100 kg
Medal record
Men's judo
Representing Serbia
IJF Grand Prix
Bronze medal – third place	2017 Antalya	+100 kg
European U23 Championships
Bronze medal – third place	2017 Podgorica	+100 kg
European Junior Championships
Bronze medal – third place	2015 Oberwart	+100 kg
Bronze medal – third place	2016 Malaga	+100 kg
Mediterranean Games
Gold medal – first place	2018 Tarragona	+100 kg

Profile at external databases
- IJF: 14614
- JudoInside.com: 86888
- Updated on 3 December 2021

Žarko Ćulum (born 2 January 1996) is a Serbian judoka. He won European U-23 Championships bronze in 2017 in Podgorica.

== Achievements ==
Year	Tournament	Place	Weight class
2018	Mediterranean Games	1st	+100 kg
2017	European U-23 Championships	3rd	+100 kg
2017	Grand Prix Antalya	3rd	+100 kg
2016	European Junior Championships	3rd	+100 kg
2015	European Junior Championships	3rd	+100 kg
