= Ghofran Khelifi =

Tunisian judoka (born 1998)

Personal information
- Born: 9 July 1998 (age 27)
- Occupation: Judoka

Sport
- Country: Tunisia
- Sport: Judo
- Weight class: 57 kg
Medal record
Women's judo
Representing Tunisia
African Games
Gold medal – first place	2019 Rabat	−57 kg
African Championships
Gold medal – first place	2017 Antananarivo	−57 kg
Gold medal – first place	2019 Cape Town	−57 kg
Gold medal – first place	2021 Dakar	−57 kg
Bronze medal – third place	2018 Tunis	−57 kg
Bronze medal – third place	2020 Antananarivo	−57 kg
Mediterranean Games
Bronze medal – third place	2018 Tarragona	−57 kg

Profile at external databases
- IJF: 15570
- JudoInside.com: 105956
- Updated on 7 November 2021

Ghofran Khelifi (born 9 July 1998) is a Tunisian judoka. She is a gold medalist at the African Games. She is also a three-time gold medalist at the African Judo Championships. She represented Tunisia at the 2020 Summer Olympics held in Tokyo, Japan.

== Career ==
She won the gold medal in the women's 57 kg event at the 2017 African Judo Championships held in Antananarivo, Madagascar. A year later, she won one of the bronze medals in this event at the 2018 African Judo Championships held in Tunis, Tunisia. In that year, she also won one of the bronze medals in the women's 57 kg event at the 2018 Mediterranean Games held in Tarragona, Spain. In 2019, she won the gold medal in the women's 57 kg event at the African Judo Championships held in Cape Town, South Africa. At the 2020 African Judo Championships held in Antananarivo, Madagascar, she won one of the bronze medals in her event.

In January 2021, she competed in the women's 57 kg event at the Judo World Masters held in Doha, Qatar. At the 2021 African Judo Championships held in Dakar, Senegal, she won the gold medal in her event. In June 2021, she competed in the women's 57 kg event at the World Judo Championships held in Budapest, Hungary where she was eliminated in her first match by Sanne Verhagen of the Netherlands.

She competed in the women's 57 kg event at the 2020 Summer Olympics held in Tokyo, Japan where she was eliminated in her first match by Ivelina Ilieva of Bulgaria.

== Achievements ==
Year	Tournament	Place	Weight class
2017	African Championships	1st	−57 kg
2018	African Championships	3rd	−57 kg
2018	Mediterranean Games	3rd	−57 kg
2019	African Championships	1st	−57 kg
2019	African Games	1st	−57 kg
2020	African Championships	3rd	−57 kg
2021	African Championships	1st	−57 kg
