= Matteo Piccardo =

Italian footballer

Personal information
- Date of birth: 28 February 2000 (age 26)
- Place of birth: Genoa, Italy
- Position: Left back

Youth career
- Genoa

Senior career*
Years	Team	Apps	(Gls)
2020–2022	Pergolettese	18	(2)

International career^{‡}
2015	Italy U16	2	(0)
2017–2018	Italy U18	4	(0)
2018	Italy U19	1	(0)
- * Club domestic league appearances and goals as of 24 April 2022 ‡ National team caps and goals as of 14 August 2018

Matteo Piccardo (born 28 February 2000) is an Italian professional footballer who plays as a left back.

== Club career ==
Born in Genoa, Piccardo was formed as a player in Genoa youth system.

After his promotion to the first team in 2020, he was sold to Serie C club Pergolettese.

== International career ==
Piccardo was a young international for Italy. Convocazioni Federazione Italiana Giuoco Calcio FIGC Italia U19 14/ago/2018 - 18 anni Italia U18 02/set/2017 - 17 anni Italia U16 22/ott/2015 - 15 anni
