= Emanuele Matteucci =

Italian footballer (born 2000)

Personal information
- Date of birth: 26 January 2000 (age 26)
- Place of birth: San Miniato, Italy
- Height: 1.84 m (6 ft 0 in)
- Position: Centre back

Team information
- Current team: Prato

Youth career
- Empoli

Senior career*
| Years | Team | Apps | (Gls) |
| 2020–2022 | Empoli | 0 | (0) |
| 2020–2022 | → Pontedera (loan) | 54 | (1) |
| 2022–2023 | Mantova | 25 | (1) |
| 2023–2024 | Sestri Levante | 14 | (0) |
| 2024– | Prato | 0 | (0) |

International career^{‡}
| 2015 | Italy U15 | 6 | (0) |
| 2015 | Italy U16 | 7 | (0) |
| 2016–2017 | Italy U17 | 4 | (0) |
| 2017–2018 | Italy U18 | 3 | (0) |
- * Club domestic league appearances and goals as of 28 April 2024 ‡ National team caps and goals as of 18 April 2018

Emanuele Matteucci (born 26 January 2000) is an Italian professional footballer who plays as a centre back for Serie D club Prato.

== Club career ==
Born in San Miniato, Matteucci started his career in Empoli youth sector. On 26 December 2019, he was an unused substitute in Serie B match against Cosenza.

On 10 August 2020, he was loaned to Serie C club Pontedera. Matteucci made his professional debut on 27 September against Olbia. On 23 July 2021, the club extended his loan.

On 16 July 2022, Matteucci signed with Mantova.

On 18 July 2024, Matteucci moved to Prato.

== International career ==
Matteucci was a youth international for Italy.
