= Montenegro at the 2018 Mediterranean Games =

- IOC code: MNE

in Tarragona, Spain
- Medals: Gold 0 Silver 0 Bronze 0 Total 0

Mediterranean Games appearances (overview)
- 2009; 2013; 2018; 2022

Other related appearances
- Yugoslavia (1951–1991); Serbia and Montenegro (1997–2005)

Montenegro competed at the 2018 Mediterranean Games in Tarragona, Spain from 22 June to 1 July 2018. They finished fourteeneth and won one medal, a bronze in the women's kumite 68 kg event.

== Medals ==
Medals by sport
Sport	1st place, gold medalist(s)	2nd place, silver medalist(s)	3rd place, bronze medalist(s)	Total	Rank
Karate	0	0	1	1	14

== Karate ==
Marina Raković won the bronze medals in the women's kumite 68 kg event.
