= Italy at the 2018 Mediterranean Games =

- IOC code: ITA
- NOC: Italian National Olympic Committee

in (Spain) Tarragona
- Competitors: 502 in 31 sports
- Medals Ranked 1st: Gold 56 Silver 56 Bronze 44 Total 156

Mediterranean Games appearances (overview)
- 1951; 1955; 1959; 1963; 1967; 1971; 1975; 1979; 1983; 1987; 1991; 1993; 1997; 2001; 2005; 2009; 2013; 2018; 2022; 2026

Italy competed at the 2018 Mediterranean Games in Tarragona, Spain from 22 June to 1 July 2018.

== Medals ==
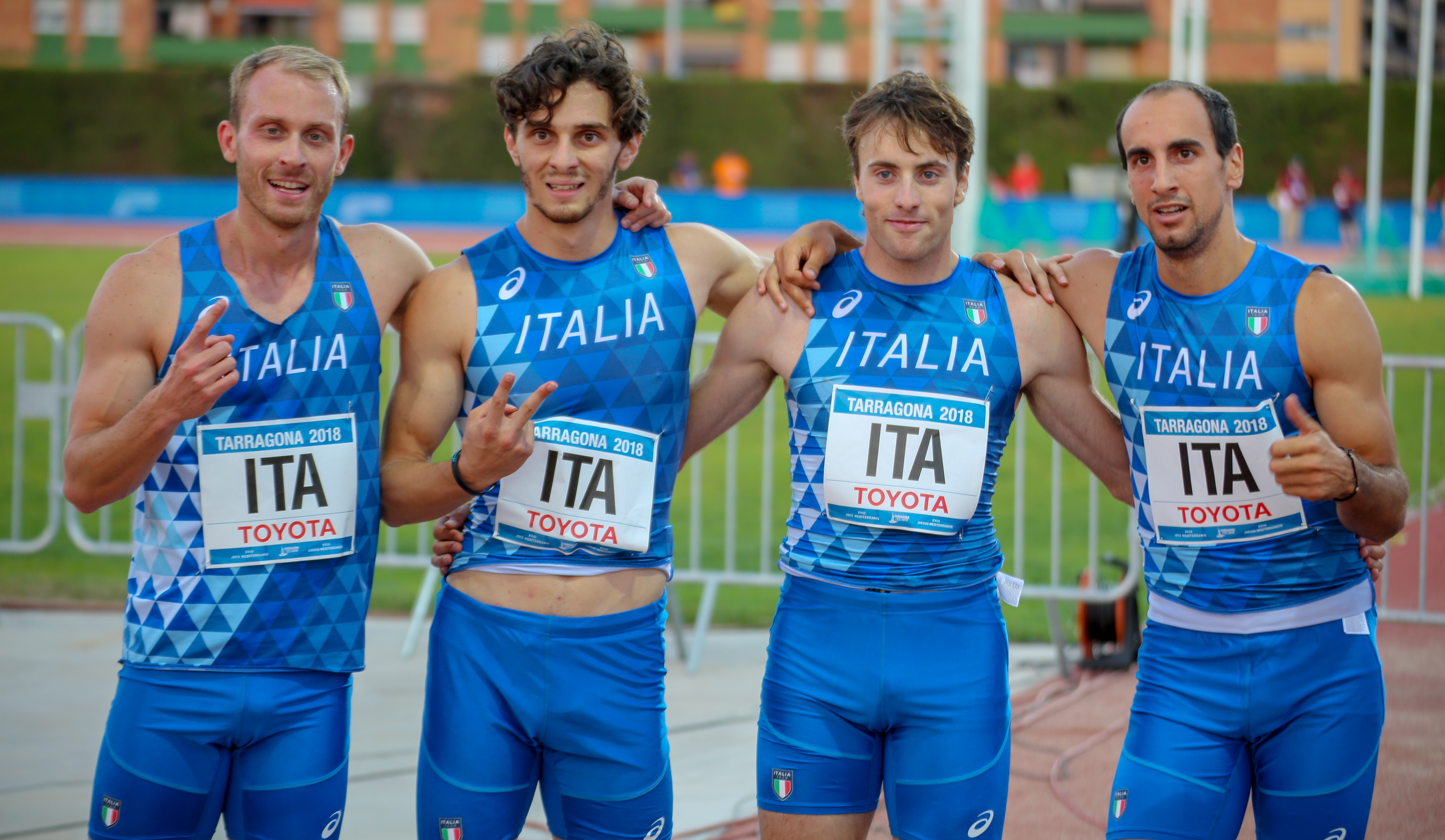
Italy at the 2018 Mediterranean Games (4×400 meters men)

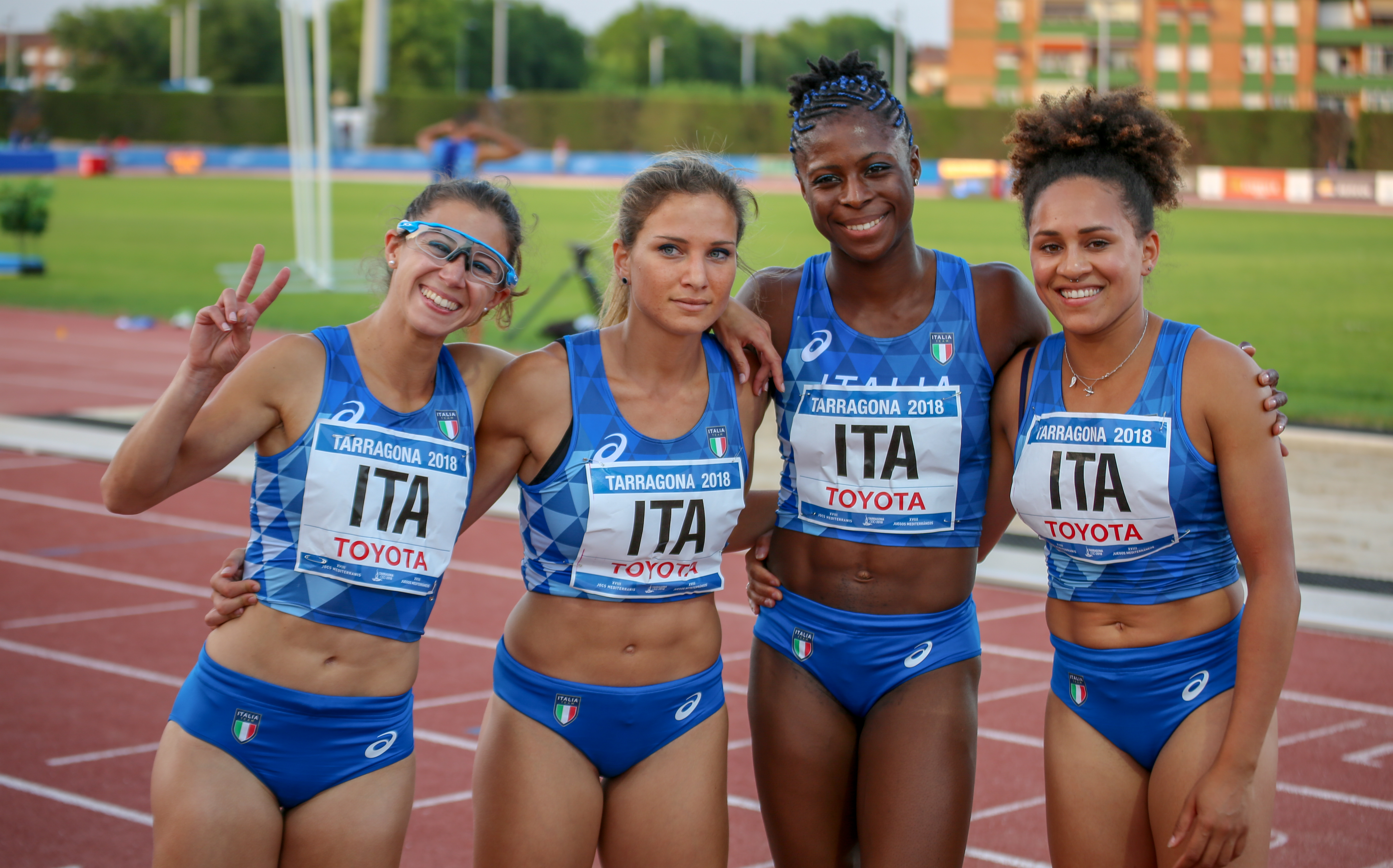
Italy at the 2018 Mediterranean Games (4×100 meters women)

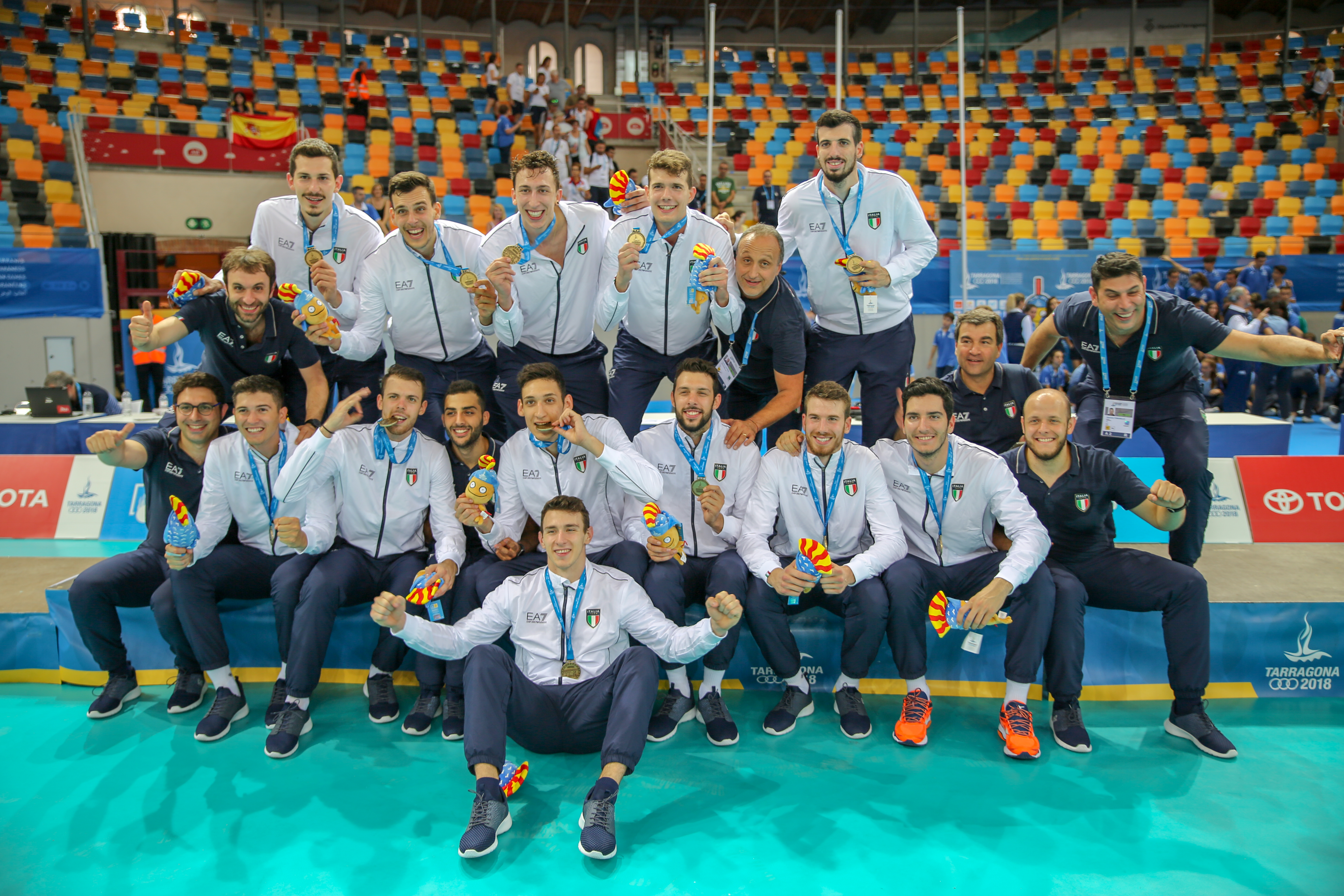
Volleyball final men's, gold medal

Medals by sport
Sport	1st place, gold medalist(s)	2nd place, silver medalist(s)	3rd place, bronze medalist(s)	Total	Rank
Archery	1	0	0	1	3
Athletics	7	8	8	23	2
Artistic Gymnastics	3	2	0	5	2
Badminton	0	0	1	1	4
Basketball	0	1	0	1	2
Beach volleyball	0	1	0	1	3
Bowls	1	3	3	7	4
Boxing	2	1	1	4	2
Cycling	4	2	1	7	1
Equestrian	0	0	1	1	3
Fencing	1	2	1	4	2
Football	0	1	0	1	2
Golf	0	4	0	4	2
Judo	3	5	3	11	2
Karate	1	1	3	5	3
Rhythmic gymnastics	1	0	1	2	1
Rowing	3	1	1	5	1
Saling	1	1	2	4	2
Shooting	0	1	3	4	5
Swimming	22	13	8	43	1
Taekwondo	0	0	1	1	11
Tennis	0	0	1	1	7
Triathlon	0	0	1	1	3
Volleyball	1	0	0	1	1
Water polo	0	1	0	1	2
Waterski	1	1	0	2	2
Weightlifting	3	4	3	10	1
Wrestling	1	3	1	5	3
	56	56	44	156	1

== Medalists ==
Updated to 29 June (122 medals).

=== Archery ===
Medal	Date	Event	Athlete
Gold	24 June	70 m	Lucilla Boari

=== Artistic Gymnastics ===
Medal	Date	Event	Athlete
Gold	26 June	Floor	Lara Mori
Silver	26 June	Balance beam	Giada Grisetti
Silver	26 June	Rings	Marco Lodadio
Gold	25 June	Team all-around	Lara Mori; Giada Grisetti; Caterina Cereghetti; Francesca Linari; Martina Maggio; Martina Basile
Gold	25 June	All-around	Lara Mori

=== Athletics ===
Medal	Date	Event	Athlete
Gold	30 June	110 m hs	Lorenzo Perini
Gold	30 June	400 m hs	Yadisleidy Pedroso
Gold	30 June	4 × 100 m relay	Federico Cattaneo; Eseosa Desalu; Davide Manenti; Filippo Tortu
Gold	30 June	4 × 400 m relay	Matteo Galvan; Giuseppe Leonardi; Davide Re; Michele Tricca
Gold	30 June	4 × 400 m relay	Maria Benedicta Chigbolu; Ayomide Folorunso; Libania Grenot; Raphaela Boaheng Lukudo
Gold	30 June	Women's half marathon	Sara Dossena
Silver	30 June	Men's half marathon	Eyob Faniel
Silver	30 June	Javelin throw	Roberto Bertolini
Silver	30 June	400 m hs	Ayomide Folorunso
Bronze	30 June	4 × 100 m relay	Anna Bongiorni; Johanelis Herrera Abreu; Gloria Hooper; Irene Siragusa
Silver	29 June	200 m	Eseosa Desalu
Silver	29 June	200 m	Gloria Hooper
Silver	29 June	100 m hs	Luminosa Bogliolo
Silver	29 June	Triple jump	Ottavia Cestonaro
Bronze	29 June	Discus throw	Hannes Kirchler
Bronze	29 June	High jump	Marco Fassinotti
Gold	28 June	400 m	Davide Re
Silver	28 June	400 m	Libania Grenot
Bronze	28 June	400 m	Benedicta Chigbolu
Bronze	28 June	100 m	Federico Cattaneo
Bronze	28 June	100 m	Anna Bongiorni
Bronze	27 June	3000 m steeplechase	Yohanes Chiappinelli
Bronze	27 June	5000 m	Yemaneberhan Crippa

=== Badminton ===
Medal	Date	Event	Athlete
Bronze	25 June	Men's double	Lukas Osele; Kevin Strobl

=== Basketball ===
Medal	Date	Event	Athlete
Bronze	29 June	Men's tournament	Riccardo Bolpin; Vittorio Nobile; Marco Spissu; Leonardo Totè

=== Bowls ===
Medal	Date	Event	Athlete
Gold	29 June	Men's Petanque - Precision throw	Diego Rizzi
Silver	29 June	Men's Lyonnaise - Progressive throw	Stefano Pegoraro
Bronze	29 June	Women's Lyonnaise - Progressive throw	Serena Traversa

=== Boxing ===
Medal	Date	Event	Athlete
Bronze	29 June	52 kg	Manuel Fabrizio Cappai

=== Cycling ===
Medal	Date	Event	Athlete
Gold	27 June	Men's road race	Jalel Duranti
Gold	27 June	Women's road race	Elisa Longo Borghini
Silver	27 June	Men's road race	Filippo Tagliani
Bronze	27 June	Women's road race	Erica Magnaldi

=== Equestrian ===
Medal	Date	Event	Athlete
Bronze	27 June	Team jumping	Giampiero Garofalo; Francesca Arioldi; Filippo Bologni; Matteo Leonardi

=== Fencing ===
Medal	Date	Event	Athlete
Silver	25 June	Sabre	Sofia Ciaraglia
Gold	25 June	Épée	Roberta Marzani
Bronze	25 June	Épée	Nicol Foietta
Silver	24 June	Foil	Valentina De Costanzo

=== Football ===
Medal	Date	Event	Athlete
Silver	25 June	Men's tournament	Italy national under-18 football team Lorenzo Babbi, Gabriele Bellodi; Roberto Biancu, Gabriele Corbo; Niccolò Corrado, Gabriele Ferrarini; Lorenzo Gavioli, Luca Gemello; Simone Ghidotti, Emanuele Matteucci; Davide Merola, Samuele Mulattieri; Hans Nicolussi Caviglia, Matteo Piccardo; Marco Pompetti, Manolo Portanova; Nicola Rauti, Emanuel Vignato

=== Golf ===
Medal	Date	Event	Athlete
Silver	28 June	Men's individual	Aron Zemmer
Silver	28 June	Men's team	Philip Geerts; Jacopo Vecchi Fossa; Fossa Aron Zemmer
Silver	28 June	Women's individual	Angelica Moresco
Silver	28 June	Women's team	Roberta Liti; Diana Luna; Angelica Moresco

=== Judo ===
Medal	Date	Event	Athlete
Gold	29 June	Women's 78 kg	Giorgia Stangherlin
Silver	29 June	Men's +100 kg	Vincenzo D’Arco
Silver	29 June	Men's 100 kg	Giuliano Loporchio
Gold	28 June	Women's 63 kg	Edwige Gwend
Silver	28 June	Women's 70 kg	Carola Paissoni
Bronze	28 June	Men's 90 kg	Nicholas Mungai
Bronze	28 June	Men's 73 kg	Fabio Basile
Gold	27 June	Men's 66 kg	Manuel Lombardo
Silver	27 June	Women's 57 kg	Miriam Boi
Silver	27 June	Women's 52 kg	Odette Giuffrida
Bronze	27 June	Women's +48 kg	Francesca Milani

=== Karate ===
Medal	Date	Event	Athlete
Bronze	24 June	Men's Less than 84 kg	Michele Martina
Gold	23 June	Women's Less than 68 kg	Silvia Semeraro
Bronze	23 June	Women's Less than 61 kg	Viola Lallo
Silver	23 June	Women's Less than 55 kg	Sara Cardin
Bronze	23 June	Men's Less than 75 kg	Rabii Jendoubi

=== Rhythmic gymnastics ===
Medal	Date	Event	Athlete
Gold	30 June	Women's individual all-around	Alexandra Agiurgiuculese
Bronze	30 June	Women's individual all-around	Milena Baldassarri

=== Rowing ===
Medal	Date	Event	Athlete
Gold	30 June	Women's Lightweight single sculls	Valentina Rodini
Silver	30 June	Women's Single sculls	Kiri Tontodonati

=== Sailing ===
Medal	Date	Event	Athlete
Gold	29 June	Men's RS:X	Mattia Camboni
Silver	29 June	Women's Laser radial	Silvia Zennaro
Bronze	29 June	Men's RS:X	Matteo Evangelisti
Bronze	29 June	Women's RS:X	Flavia Tartaglini

=== Shooting ===
Medal	Date	Event	Athlete
Silver	24 June	Women's 10m air rifle	Martina Ziviani
Bronze	24 June	Men's Trap	Giovanni Pellielo
Bronze	24 June	Men's 10m air rifle	Simon Weithaler
Bronze	24 June	Women's Trap	Maria Lucia Palmitessa

=== Swimming ===
Medal	Date	Event	Athlete
Gold	25 June	4×100 medley	Arianna Castiglioni; Elena Di Liddo; Erika Ferraioli; Margherita Panziera
Gold	25 June	400 freestyle	Simona Quadarella
Silver	25 June	400 freestyle	Domenico Acerenza
Gold	25 June	400 freestyle	Gregorio Paltrinieri
Gold	25 June	200 backstroke	Margherita Panziera
Gold	25 June	200 backstroke	Christopher Ciccarese
Bronze	25 June	200 butterfly	Alessia Polieri
Silver	25 June	200 butterfly	Filippo Berlincioni
Gold	25 June	50 breaststroke	Arianna Castiglioni
Silver	25 June	50 breaststroke	Martina Carraro
Gold	25 June	50 breaststroke	Fabio Scozzoli
Gold	24 June	4×200 freestyle	Matteo Ciampi; Stefano Di Cola; Filippo Megli; Mattia Zuin
Gold	24 June	4×100 freestyle	Paola Biagioli; Erika Ferraioli; Giada Galizi; Laura Letrari
Silver	24 June	1500 freestyle	Domenico Acerenza
Silver	24 June	100 backstroke	Simone Sabbioni
Silver	24 June	50 butterfly	Elena Di Liddo
Bronze	24 June	50 butterfly	Piero Codia
Bronze	24 June	100 breaststroke	Arianna Castiglioni
Gold	24 June	100 breaststroke	Fabio Scozzoli
Bronze	24 June	200 freestyle	Linda Caponi
Silver	24 June	100 freestyle	Alessandro Miressi
Bronze	24 June	100 freestyle	Luca Dotto
Bronze	24 June	200 medley	Anna Pirovano
Gold	24 June	400 medley	Federico Turrini
Bronze	23 June	400 medley	Carlotta Toni
Gold	23 June	200 breaststroke	Luca Pizzini
Gold	23 June	100 butterfly	Elena Di Liddo
Silver	23 June	100 butterfly	Matteo Rivolta
Gold	23 June	100 butterfly	Piero Codia
Gold	23 June	50 backstroke	Silvia Scalia
Silver	23 June	50 backstroke	Nicolò Bonacchi
Gold	23 June	50 backstroke	Simone Sabbioni
Gold	23 June	100 freestyle	Erika Ferraioli
Silver	23 June	200 freestyle	Filippo Megli

=== Triathlon ===
Medal	Date	Event	Athlete
Bronze	23 June	Women race	Federica Parodi

=== Volleyball ===
Medal	Date	Event	Athlete
Gold	1 July	Men's tournament	Fabio Balaso, Oreste Cavuto; Enrico Diamantini, Sebastiano Milan; Marco Pierotti, Giulio Pinali; Alberto Polo, Giacomo Raffaelli; Roberto Russo, Riccardo Sbertoli; Luca Spirito, Nicola Tiozzo

=== Waterski ===
Medal	Date	Event	Athlete
Gold	24 June	Slalom	Brando Caruso
Silver	24 June	Slalom	Carlo Allais

=== Weightlifting ===
Medal	Date	Event	Athlete
Gold	26 June	Men's 85 kg Snatch	Cristiano Ficco
Silver	26 June	Women's 69 kg Clean and jerk	Giorgia Bordignon
Silver	26 June	Women's 69 kg Snatch	Giorgia Bordignon
Bronze	26 June	Men's 69 kg Snatch	Milena Gianelli
Gold	24 June	Women's 53 kg Snatch	Jennifer Lombardo
Gold	24 June	Women's 53 kg Clean and jerk	Jennifer Lombardo
Silver	24 June	Women's 53 kg Clean and jerk	Giorgia Russo
Silver	24 June	Men's 69 kg Snatch	Mirko Zanni
Bronze	23 June	Men's 48 kg Snatch	Alessandra Pagliaro
Bronze	23 June	Men's 62 kg Clean and jerk	Michael Di Giusto

=== Wrestling ===
Medal	Date	Event	Athlete
Silver	27 June	Freestyle 68 kg	Dalma Caneva
Silver	27 June	Freestyle 57 kg	Carola Rainero
Bronze	27 June	Freestyle 62 kg	Sara Da Col
Gold	26 June	Freestyle 74 kg	Frank Chamizo
Silver	26 June	Freestyle 97 kg	Simone Iannattoni

== See also ==
- Italy at the Mediterranean Games
