= 2013 World Taekwondo Championships – Women's lightweight =

Women's lightweight at the 2013 World Championships
- Venue: Exhibition Center of Puebla
- Dates: 18 July 2013
- Competitors: 42 from 41 nations

Medalists
gold medal	Carmen Marton	Australia
silver medal	Kim Hwi-lang	South Korea
bronze medal	Rabia Gülec	Germany
bronze medal	Nina Kläy	Switzerland

The women's lightweight is a competition featured at the 2013 World Taekwondo Championships, and was held at the Exhibition Center of Puebla in Puebla, Mexico on July 18. Llightweights were limited to a maximum of 62 kilograms in body mass.

== Results ==
=== Finals ===
Semifinals		Final
Carmen Marton (AUS)	7
Rabia Gülec (GER)	2	Carmen Marton (AUS)	7
Nina Kläy (SUI)	4	Kim Hwi-lang (KOR)	3
Kim Hwi-lang (KOR)	8

=== Top half ===
==== Section 1 ====
Round of 64
Carmen Marton (AUS)	6
Rekha Ranee Gogoi (WTF)	0
Federica Perugini (ITA)	5
Ruth Gbagbi (CIV)	4
Viktoryia Belanouskaya (BLR)	2
Nidia Muñoz (CUB)	3

Round of 32
Zhang Hua (CHN)	3
Carmen Marton (AUS)	9
Gradi Kamuanya (COD)	3
Lia Karina Mansur (INA)	16
Dürdane Altunel (TUR)	12
Federica Perugini (ITA)	4
Nidia Muñoz (CUB)	1
Elin Johansson (SWE)	2

Round of 16
Carmen Marton (AUS)	7
Lia Karina Mansur (INA)	1
Dürdane Altunel (TUR)	2
Elin Johansson (SWE)	9

Quarterfinals
Carmen Marton (AUS)	3
Elin Johansson (SWE)	2

==== Section 2 ====
Round of 64
Júlia Vasconcelos (BRA)	5
Daria Gorbacheva (AZE)	2
Marta Calvo (ESP)	11
Phạm Thị Thu Hiền (VIE)	3

Round of 32
Joyce van Baaren (NED)	6
Júlia Vasconcelos (BRA)	7
Luciana Angiolillo (ARG)	10
Feng Xiao (MAC)	2
Rabia Gülec (GER)	8
Iris Carvallo (ECU)	4
Marta Calvo (ESP)	3
Rangsiya Nisaisom (THA)	4

Round of 16
Júlia Vasconcelos (BRA)	7
Luciana Angiolillo (ARG)	3
Rabia Gülec (GER)	7
Rangsiya Nisaisom (THA)	1

Quarterfinals
Júlia Vasconcelos (BRA)	4
Rabia Gülec (GER)	5

=== Bottom half ===
==== Section 3 ====
Round of 64
Chang Man-ting (TPE)	5
Vasiliki Grammatikopoulou (GRE)	7
Aleksandra Uścińska (POL)	3
Diana López (USA)	4

Round of 32
Aline Dossou-Gbete (FRA)	5
Vasiliki Grammatikopoulou (GRE)	1
Yudy Pérez (COL)	4
Darya Yakovleva (UKR)	3
Melissa Oviedo (MEX)	4
Wafa Bellar (TUN)	3
Diana López (USA)	2
Nina Kläy (SUI)	10

Round of 16
Aline Dossou-Gbete (FRA)	5
Yudy Pérez (COL)	3
Melissa Oviedo (MEX)	1
Nina Kläy (SUI)	5

Quarterfinals
Aline Dossou-Gbete (FRA)	3
Nina Kläy (SUI)	8

==== Section 4 ====
Round of 64
María Jara (CHI)	1
Adanys Cordero (VEN)	9
Hedaya Malak (EGY)	22
Aleksandra Radmilović (SRB)	2
Feruza Yergeshova (KAZ)	3
Kim Hwi-lang (KOR)	11

Round of 32
Marina Cheshuina (RUS)	8
Adanys Cordero (VEN)	1
Hedaya Malak (EGY)	9
Ashley Kraayeveld (CAN)	8
Aurora Román (PUR)	5
Julyana Al-Sadeq (JOR)	6
Kim Hwi-lang (KOR)	12
Marina Sumić (CRO)	5

Round of 16
Marina Cheshuina (RUS)	4
Hedaya Malak (EGY)	5
Julyana Al-Sadeq (JOR)	1
Kim Hwi-lang (KOR)	15

Quarterfinals
Hedaya Malak (EGY)	8
Kim Hwi-lang (KOR)	11
