= Turkey at the 2018 Mediterranean Games =

- IOC code: TUR
- NOC: Turkish Olympic Committee

in Tarragona 22 June – 1 July
- Competitors: 349 in 31 sports
- Medals Ranked 3rd: Gold 31 Silver 25 Bronze 39 Total 95

Mediterranean Games appearances (overview)
- 1951; 1955; 1959; 1963; 1967; 1971; 1975; 1979; 1983; 1987; 1991; 1993; 1997; 2001; 2005; 2009; 2013; 2018; 2022

Turkey participated in the 2018 Mediterranean Games held in Tarragona, Spain from 22 June to 1 July 2018. 349 Turkish athletes, including 205 males and 144 females, were registered to compete in 31 sports at the Games.

== Medals ==
Medal	Athlete(s)	Sport	Event
Gold	Başak Eraydın	Tennis	Women's singles
Gold	Başak Eraydın; İpek Öz	Tennis	Women's doubles
Gold	Bediha Gün	Wrestling	Women's freestyle 57 kg
Gold	Buse Tosun	Wrestling	Women's freestyle 68 kg
Gold	Daniyar İsmayilov	Weightlifting	Men's 69 kg – Snatch
Gold	Daniyar İsmayilov	Weightlifting	Men's 69 kg – Clean & jerk
Gold	Elif Jale Yeşilırmak	Wrestling	Women's freestyle 62 kg
Gold	Erman Eltemur	Karate	Men's 75 kg
Gold	Evin Demirhan	Wrestling	Women's freestyle 50 kg
Gold	İbrahim Çolak	Gymnastics	Men's rings
Gold	İnci Ece Öztürk	Boules	Women's volo progressive
Gold	İrem Yaman	Taekwondo	Women's 57 kg
Gold	Jak Ali Harvey	Athletics	Men's 100 m
Gold	Kayra Sayit	Judo	Women's +78 kg
Gold	Mete Gazoz	Archery	Men's individual
Gold	Metehan Başar	Wrestling	Greco-Roman 87 kg
Gold	Neslihan Yiğit	Badminton	Women's singles
Gold	Nuray Levent	Weightlifting	Women's 63 kg – Clean & jerk
Gold	Ramil Guliyev	Athletics	Men's 200 m
Gold	Rukiye Yıldırım	Taekwondo	Women's 49 kg
Gold	Selahattin Kılıçsallayan	Wrestling	Freestyle 65 kg
Gold	Şaziye Erdoğan	Weightlifting	Women's 48 kg – Snatch
Gold	Şaziye Erdoğan	Weightlifting	Women's 48 kg – Clean & jerk
Gold	Tuba Yakan	Karate	Women's 55 kg
Gold	Tuğrulhan Erdemir	Boxing	Men's 64 kg
Gold	Volkan Göğtepe; Murat Giginoğlu	Beach volleyball	Men's tournament
Gold	Yunus Emre Başar	Wrestling	Greco-Roman 77 kg
Gold	Zübeyde Süpürgeci	Athletics	Women's 800 m T54
Silver	Ahmet Önder	Gymnastics	Parallel bars
Silver	Ahmet Önder	Gymnastics	Floor
Silver	Ahmet Önder	Gymnastics	Vault
Silver	Aysun Erge	Wrestling	Women's freestyle 53 kg
Silver	Bayram Malkan	Boxing	Men's 81 kg
Silver	Bengisu Erçetin; Nazlıcan İnci	Badminton	Women's doubles
Silver	Bilal Çiloğlu	Judo	Men's 73 kg
Silver	Burak Uygur	Karate	Men's 67 kg
Silver	Eda Eltemur	Karate	Women's 68 kg
Silver	Elchin Aliyev	Wrestling	Greco-Roman 60 kg
Silver	Emre Zafer Barnes	Athletics	Men's 100 m
Silver	Emre Zafer Barnes; Jak Ali Harvey; Ramil Guliyev; Yiğitcan Hekimoğlu	Athletics	Men's 4 × 100 m relay
Silver	Erol Bilgin	Weightlifting	Men's 62 kg – Snatch
Silver	Erol Bilgin	Weightlifting	Men's 62 kg – Clean & jerk
Silver	Ferhat Arıcan; İbrahim Çolak; Ahmet Önder; Sercan Demir; Ümit Şamiloğlu	Gymnastics	Men's team all-around
Silver	Gül Pembe Özkaya; Özge Yılmaz; Sibel Altınkaya	Table tennis	Women's team
Silver	Gülçin Çelik	Boules	Women's petanque precision shooting
Silver	Hakan Doğan	Boxing	Men's 60 kg
Silver	Kıvılcım Kaya Salman	Athletics	Women's hammer throw
Silver	Nuray Levent	Weightlifting	Women's 63 kg – Snatch
Silver	Resul Elvan	Weightlifting	Men's 105 kg – Clean & jerk
Silver	Serdar Koca; Serhat Salim	Badminton	Men's doubles
Silver	Ümit Şamiloğlu	Gymnastics	Horizontal bar
Silver	Viktoriya Zeynep Güneş	Swimming	Women's 200 m individual medley
Silver	Turkey women's national volleyball team	Volleyball	Women's tournament
Bronze	Ali İhsan Alağaş	Boxing	Men's 56 kg
Bronze	Aliye Demirbağ	Badminton	Women's singles
Bronze	Aybüke Aktuna	Archery	Women's individual
Bronze	Aybüke Aktuna; Gülnaz Büşranur Coşkun; Yasemin Ecem Anagöz	Archery	Women's team
Bronze	Ayşegül Çakın	Weightlifting	Women's 58 kg – Snatch
Bronze	Bekir Özlü	Judo	Men's 60 kg
Bronze	Berkay Ömer Öğretir	Swimming	Men's 50 m breaststroke
Bronze	Burak Aksın	Boxing	Men's 91 kg
Bronze	Büşra Katipoğlu	Judo	Women's 63 kg
Bronze	Celil Erdoğdu	Weightlifting	Men's 77 kg – Snatch
Bronze	Celil Erdoğdu	Weightlifting	Men's 77 kg – Clean & jerk
Bronze	Ege Başer; Hüseyin Emre Sakçı; Kemal Arda Gürdal; Ümit Can Güreş	Swimming	Men's 4 × 100 m medley relay
Bronze	Emre Kutalmış Ateşli	Taekwondo	Men's +80 kg
Bronze	Eray Şamdan	Karate	Men's 60 kg
Bronze	Ferhat Arıcan	Gymnastics	Vault
Bronze	Gizem Bozkurt; Burcu Dolunay; Esra Kübra Kaçmaz; Halime Zülal Zeren	Swimming	Women's 4 × 100 m freestyle relay
Bronze	Gülçin Çelik	Boules	Women's petanque precision shooting
Bronze	Hakan Reçber	Taekwondo	Men's 68 kg
Bronze	Hasan Mermer; Sefa Urlu	Beach volleyball	Men's tournament
Bronze	Hüseyin Emre Sakçı; İskender Başlakov; Kemal Arda Gürdal; Yalım Acımış	Swimming	Men's 4 × 100 m freestyle relay
Bronze	İbrahim Gündüz	Table tennis	Men's singles
Bronze	İlhan Sarp Ağabigün; Anıl Yüksel	Tennis	Men's doubles
Bronze	İrem Korkmaz	Judo	Women's 52 kg
Bronze	Kaan Kigen Özbilen	Athletics	Men's half marathon
Bronze	Meltem Hocaoğlu	Karate	Women's +68 kg
Bronze	Muhammet Demir	Wrestling	Freestyle 74 kg
Bronze	Murat Fırat	Wrestling	Greco-Roman 67 kg
Bronze	Nafia Kuş	Taekwondo	Women's +67 kg
Bronze	Nurcan Yılmaz	Judo	Women's 70 kg
Bronze	Onur Şipal	Boxing	Men's 69 kg
Bronze	Rabia Kaya	Weightlifting	Women's 75 kg – Snatch
Bronze	Resul Elvan	Weightlifting	Men's 105 kg – Snatch
Bronze	Serap Özçelik	Karate	Women's 50 kg
Bronze	Sibel Altınkaya; Özge Yılmaz; Gül Pembe Özkaya	Table tennis	Women's team
Bronze	Ümit Can Güreş	Swimming	Men's 100 m butterfly
Bronze	Viktoriya Zeynep Güneş	Swimming	Women's 200 m breaststroke
Bronze	Yunus Sarı	Taekwondo	Men's 80 kg
Bronze	Turkey women's national volleyball team	Volleyball	Women's tournament
Bronze	Turkey women's national handball team	Handball	Women's tournament
Bronze	Turkey men's national volleyball team	Volleyball	Men's tournament
Bronze	Aysel Taş	Athletics	Women's javelin throw
Bronze	Nesrin Özgün	Swimming	Women's 400 m freestyle
Bronze	Kemal Arda Gürdal; Güven Duvan; Demir Atasoy; Kaan Türker Ayar	Swimming	Men's 4 × 100 m medley relay
Bronze	Kemal Arda Gürdal; Nezir Karap; Furkan Deniz Maraşlı; Doğa Çelik	Swimming	Men's 4 × 200 m freestyle relay
Bronze	Çağla Büyükakçay; Pemra Özgen	Tennis	Women's doubles
Bronze	Burcu Dolunay; Halime Zülal Zeren; Gizem Bozkurt; Esra Kübra Kaçmaz	Swimming	Women's 4 × 100 m freestyle relay
Bronze	Neslihan Yiğit; Özge Bayrak	Badminton	Women's doubles
Bronze	Çağrıbey Yıldırım; Serhat Kadir Yılmaz	Canoeing	Men's K2 200 m
Bronze	İsmail Aslan; Ferhat Altunkalem; İzzet Safer; Umutcan Emektaş	Athletics	Men's 4 × 100 m relay
Bronze	Kemal Arda Gürdal; Güven Duvan; Demir Atasoy; Kaan Türker Ayar	Swimming	Men's 4 × 100 m medley relay
Bronze	Deniz Demir; Benay Gündüz	Boules	Women's raffa doubles

== Medal table ==
Sport	Gold	Silver	Bronze	Total
Archery	1	0	2	3
Athletics	3	4	1	8
Badminton	1	2	1	4
Beach volleyball	1	0	1	2
Bowls	1	1	0	2
Boxing	1	2	3	6
Gymnastics, artistic	2	5	2	9
Judo	1	1	4	6
Karate	2	2	3	7
Swimming	0	1	7	8
Table tennis	0	1	1	2
Taekwondo	2	0	4	6
Tennis	2	0	1	3
Volleyball	0	0	1	1
Weightlifting	6	4	5	15
Wrestling	8	2	3	13
Total	31	25	39	95

== Archery ==
=== Men ===
Athlete	Event	1/24 Elimination	1/16 Elimination	1/8 Elimination	Quarterfinal	Semifinal	Final/Bronze medal	Rank
Fatih Bozlar	Individual 70m	BYE	(Cyprus) Andreas Onoufriou; W 6–4	(Turkey) Mete Gazoz; L 0–6	Did not advance			–
İbrahim Ethem Gülaçar	Individual 70m	BYE	(Spain) Antonio Fernández Fernández; W 6–2	(Greece) Christos Aerikos; W 7–3	(Italy) Amedeo Tonelli; W 6–4	(Turkey) Mete Gazoz; L 2–6	(Spain) Pablo Acha Gonzalez; L 3–7	4th
Mete Gazoz	Individual 70m	BYE	(Cyprus) Konstantinos Loizou; W 6–0	(Turkey) Fatih Bozlar; W 6–0	(Croatia) Alen Remar; W 7–3	(Turkey) İbrahim Ethem Gülaçar; W 6–2	(Slovenia) Gasper Strajkar; W 6–2	1st place, gold medalist(s)
Fatih Bozlar; İbrahim Ethem Gülaçar |Mete Gazoz	Team 70m	—N/a	—N/a	BYE	(France); L 1–5	Did not advance		–

=== Women ===
Athlete	Event	1/16 Elimination	1/8 Elimination	Quarterfinal	Semifinal	Final/Bronze medal	Rank
Aybüke Aktuna	Individual 70m	BYE	(Italy) Tatiana Andreoli; W 6–2	(Turkey) Yasemin Ecem Anagöz; W 6–5	(Spain) Monica alisteo Cruz; L 5–6	(Spain) Alicia MAarin Martinez; W 6–4	3rd place, bronze medalist(s)
Gülnaz Büşranur Coşkun	Individual 70m	BYE	(Spain) Nerea Lopez Sanchis; L 0–6	Did not advance			–
Yasemin Ecem Anagöz	Individual 70m	BYE	(Greece) Evangelia Psarra; W 6–0	(Turkey) Aybüke Aktuna; L 5–6	Did not advance		–
Aybüke Aktuna; Gülnaz Büşranur Coşkun; Yasemin Ecem Anagöz	Team 70m	—N/a	—N/a	BYE	(France); L 1–5	(Italy); W 6–0	3rd place, bronze medalist(s)

== Athletics ==
=== Men ===
Athlete	Event	Heats /Semifinal		Final	
Athlete	Event	Time	Rank	Time	Rank
Emre Zafer Barnes	100 m	10.56	1st	10.32	2nd place, silver medalist(s)
Jak Ali Harvey	100 m	10.34	1st	10.10	1st place, gold medalist(s)
Ramil Guliyev	200 m	20.50	1st	20.15	1st place, gold medalist(s)
Yiğitcan Hekimoğlu	200 m	21.15	5th	DNA	–
Abdullah Tütüncü	400 m	47.65	4th	DNA	–
Yavuz Can	400 m	46.75	3rd	46.37	5th
Levent Ateş	800 m	DNF	–	DNA	–
Levent Ateş	1500 m	3:47.17	6th	3:43.09 SB	9th
Ilham Tanui Özbilen	1500 m	3:44.32	4th	3:48.27	11th
Polat Kemboi Arıkan	5000 m	—N/a		14:03.33	10th
Ramazan Özdemir	5000 m	—N/a		14:18.14	12th
Sinan Ören	400 m hurdles	51.59	6th	DNQ	–
Yasmani Copello Escobar	400 m hurdles	50.07	1st	48.76	2nd place, silver medalist(s)
Aras Kaya	3000 m steeplechase	—N/a		8:59.48	10th
Tarık Langat Akdağ	3000 m steeplechase	—N/a		DNF	–
Aykut Ay/ Yiğitcan Hekimoğlu/ Abdullah Tütüncü/ Ahmet Kasap	4 × 100 m relay	—N/a		38.50	2nd place, silver medalist(s)
Abdullah Tütüncü/ Yavuz Can/ Sinan Ören/ Yasmani Copello Escobar	4 × 400 m relay	—N/a		3:05.28	4th
Bekir Karayel	Half marathon	—N/a		DNF	–
Kaan Kigen Özbilen	Half marathon	—N/a		1:04:19.00	3rd place, bronze medalist(s)
Saffet Elkatmış	Half marathon	—N/a		1:09:00.00	12th

Athlete	Event	#1	#2	#3	#4	#5	#6	Result	Rank
Alper Kulaksız	Long jump	7.61	7.67	7.52	7.54	7.79	7.73	7.79 SB	5th
Alperen Acet	High jump							DNS	–
Osman Can Özdeveci	Shot put	19.12	19.47	19.44	19.58	19.27	19.56	19.58	5th
Emin Öncel	Javelin throw	70.06	70.90	70.64	71.85	X	71.38	71.85	4th
Fatih Avan	Javelin throw	69.94	70.29	71.59	71.71	X	66.45	71.71	5th

=== Women ===
Athlete	Event	Heat		Final	
Athlete	Event	Time	Rank	Time	Rank
Meryem Akdağ	800 m			DNS	–
Meryem Akdağ	1500 m	—N/a		4:19.04	5th
Elif Gören	400 m hurdles	58.76	3rd	57.66	4th
Özlem Kaya	3000 m steeplechase	—N/a		9:39.43 SB	5th
Büşra Nur Koku	Half marathon	—N/a		DNF	–
Elvan Abeylegesse	Half marathon	—N/a		1:18:47.00	4th
Tubay Erdal	Half marathon	—N/a		1:20:58.00	7th

Athlete	Event	#1	#2	#3	#4	#5	#6	#7	Result	Rank
Kerin Melis Mey	Long jump	6.26	6.44	6.33	6.40	6.08	6.23		6.44	7th
Buse Arıkazan	Pole vault	3.71 –	3.91 –	4.01; XO	4.11 –	4.21; XXO	4.31 –	4.36; XXX	4.21	5th
Demet Parlak	Pole vault	3.71 –	3.91 –	4.01; O	4.11 –	4.21; XXX			4.01	9th
Kıvılcım Kaya Salman	Hammer throw	70.83	71.07	70.12	69.68				71.07	2nd place, silver medalist(s)
Tuğçe Şahutoğluan	Hammer throw	61.18	X	X	63.58	X			63.58	6th

=== Paralympic Athletics ===
Athlete	Event	Heat		Final	
Athlete	Event	Time	Rank	Time	Rank
Zübeyde Süpürgeci	Women's 100 m T54	—N/a		2:15.48	1st place, gold medalist(s)

== Badminton ==
=== Men ===
Group stage

Athlete	Event	Round of 32	Round of 16	Quarterfinals	Semifinals	Final	Rank
Emre Lale	Singles	BYE	(Italy) Giovanni Greco; W 2–1 (22–20, 11–21, 21–9)	(France) Toma Junior Popov; L 1–2 (21–18, 14–21, 15–21)	Did not advance		–
Muhammed Ali Kurt	Singles	(Algeria) Madjed Yacine Balahouane; W 2–0 (21–14, 21–9)	(Greece) Ilias Xanthou; W 2–0 (21–6, 21–14)	(Italy) Rosario Maddaloni; W 2–0 (21–18, 21–19)	(France) Lucas Corvée; L 1–2 (13–21, 21–19, 13–21)	(France) Toma Junior Popov; L 0–20 (17–21,16–21)	4th
Serdar Koca/ Serhat Salim	Doubles	—N/a	BYE	(Serbia) Andrija Doder / Luka Milic; W 2–0 (21–13, 21–10)	(Portugal) Bernardo Atilano / Duarte Nuno Anjo; W 2–1 (12–21, 21–14, 21–14)	(France) Bastian Kersaudy / Thom Gicquel; L 0–2 (9–21, 19–21)	2nd place, silver medalist(s)

=== Women ===
Group stage

Athlete	Event	Round of 16	Quarterfinals	Semifinals	Final	Rank
Aliye Demirbağ	Singles	(Portugal) Sónia Gonçalves; W 2–1 (21–14, 14–21, 21–13)	(Greece) Grammatoula Sotiriou; W 2–0 (21–11, 21–6)	(Spain) Beatriz Corrales; L 0–2 (19–21, 14–21)	(France) Yaëlle Hoyaux; W 2–0 (21–17, 21–19)	3rd place, bronze medalist(s)
Neslihan Yiğit	Singles	(Italy) Katharina Fink; W 2–0 (21–6, 21–14)	(Spain) Sara Peñalver Pereira; W 2–1 (15–21, 21–14, 21–17)	(France) Yaëlle Hoyaux; W 2–0 (21–13, 21–19)	(Spain) Beatriz Corrales; W 2–0 (21–19, 23–21)	1st place, gold medalist(s)
Bengisu Erçetin/ Nazlıcan İnci	Doubles	BYE	(Italy) Lisa Iversen / Silvia Garino; W 2–0 (21–12, 21–6)	(Spain) Elena Fernandez Arboleya / Lorena Usle; W 2–0 (21–17, 21–11)	(France) Lea Palermo / Delphine Delrue; L 0–2 (17–121, 16–21)	2nd place, silver medalist(s)

== Basketball 3x3 ==
=== Men's tournament ===
Team

- Mehmet Fırat Alemdaroğlu
- Mert Başdan
- Tanalp Şengün
- Utku Saraloğlu

Group D

Pos	Team	Pld	W	L	PF	PA	PD	Qualification
1	France	3	3	0	60	29	+31	Quarterfinals
2	Cyprus	3	2	1	48	45	+3	Quarterfinals
3	Portugal	3	1	2	45	56	−11	
4	Turkey	3	0	3	40	63	−23	

Source: Tarragona 2018
Rules for classification: 1) Wins; 2) Head-to-head record; 3) Points scored.

28 June
11:00

Report

France	22–4	Turkey

Camp de Mart Auditorium, Tarragona

28 June
12:00

Report

Turkey	19–21 (OT)	Portugal

Camp de Mart Auditorium, Tarragona

29 June
11:20

Report

Turkey	17–20	Cyprus

Camp de Mart Auditorium, Tarragona

Turkey men's team did not advance to the quarterfinals, ranked 13th.

=== Women's tournament ===
Team

- Betül Erkoyuncu
- Büşra Akbaş
- Derin Yaya
- Ezgi Manlacı

Pos	Team	Pld	W	L	PF	PA	PD	Qualification
1	France	3	3	0	61	24	+37	Semifinals
2	Serbia	3	1	2	47	55	−8	Semifinals
3	Turkey	3	1	2	43	57	−14	
4	Italy	3	1	2	38	53	−15	

Source: Tarragona 2018
Rules for classification: 1) Wins; 2) Head-to-head record; 3) Points scored.

28 June
19:40

Report

Serbia	22–13	Turkey

Camp de Mart Auditorium, Tarragona

28 June
21:00

Report

Italy	15–19	Turkey

Camp de Mart Auditorium, Tarragona

29 June
10:40

Report

Turkey	11–20	France

Camp de Mart Auditorium, Tarragona

Turkey women's team did not advance to the quarterfinals, ranked 6th.

== Beach volleyball ==
=== Men's tournament ===
(Turkey) Hasan Hüseyin Mermer / Sefa Urlu (bronze)

Stage	Date	Tme	Teams	Score	Set 1	Set 2	Set 3	Total
Group E	28 Jun 2018	18:30	(Libya) Tarek Ashor Abosaud / Sultan Elhoush	W 2–0	21–5	21–14	–	42–19
Group E	29 Jun 2018	10:00	(Serbia) Lazar Kolaric / Stefan Basta	L 1–2	21–19	17–21	20–22	58–62
1/8 Final	29 Jun 2018	16:30	(Cyprus) Demetris Apostolou / Vladimir Knezevic	W 2–0	21–10	21–19	–	42-29
Quarterfinal	29 Jun 2018	19:30	(Spain) Christian Garcia / Raul Mesa	W 2–1	16–21	21–15	21–14	58–50
Semifinal	30 Jun 3018	13:00	(Italy) Enrico Rossi / Marco Caminati	L 0–2	20–22	19–21	–	39–43
Bronze medal	30 Jun 3018	17:30	(France) Quincy remi Aye / Youssef Krou	W 2–1	22–24	21–18	15–10	58–52

(Turkey) Murat Giginoğlu / Volkan Göğteper (gold)

Stage	Date	Tme	Teams	Score	Set 1	Set 2	Set 3	Total
Group F	28 Jun 2018	12:00	(Monaco) Vincent Ferry / Pascal Ferry	W 2–0	21–17	21–15	–	42–32
Group F	28 Jun 2018	18:30	(Algeria) Laid Boussaid / Mohamed Souadi	W 2–0	22–20	21–18	–	43–38
Group F	29 Jun 2018	11:00	(Spain) Alejandro Huera / Javier Huerta	W 2–0	21–12	21–15	–	42–37
1/8 Final	29 Jun 2018	15:00	(Egypt) Ahmed Farag / Abdelrahman Fayed	W 2–0	21–12	21–14	–	42–26
Quarterfinal	29 Jun 2018	19:30	(France) Arnaud Gauthier / Maxime Steğhane Thiercy	W 2–0	21–14	21–14	–	42–28
Semifinal	30 Jun 2018	12:00	(France) Quincy remi Aye / Youssef Krou	W 2–0	21–19	22–20	–	43–39
Gold medal	30 Jun 2018	19:30	(Italy) Enrico Rossi / Marco Caminati	W 2–0	21–18	21–12	–	42–30

=== Women's tournament ===
(Turkey) Selin Yurtsever / Neriman Özsoy Gençyürek Did not advance to the quarterfinals.

Stage	Date	Tme	Teams	Score	Set 1	Set 2	Set 3	Total
Group G	28 Jun 2018	13:00	(Italy) Claudia Pucinelli / Alice Gradini	L 0–2	14–21	12–21	–	26–42
Group G	28 Jun 2018	19:30	(Spain) Amaranta Fernandez / AAngela Lobato	L 0–2	9–21	7–21	–	16–42

(Turkey) Aleyna Vence / Merve Nezir Did not advance to the semifinal.

Stage	Date	Tme	Teams	Score	Set 1	Set 2	Set 3	Total
Group J	28 Jun 2018	11:00	(Morocco) Imane Zeroual / Mahassine Stad<	W 2-1	18-21	21-11	15-11	54-43
Group J	28 Jun 2018	17:30	(Kosovo) Vildane Jashari / Valmira Ramadani	W 2-0	22-20	21-9	-	43-29
Group J	29 Jun 2018	10:00	(France) Aline Chamereau / Alexandra Johanna Jupiter	L 0–2	17–21	20–22	–	37–43
Group J	29 Jun 2018	11:00	(Algeria) Sonia Bounser / Kawther Mehani	W 2–0	21–6	21–8	–	42–14
Quarterfinal	29 Jun 2018	18:30	(Spain) Maria Belen Carro / Paula Soria	L 0–2	9–21	19–21	–	28–42

== Bowls ==
=== Men ===
(Turkey) Faik Dursun Öztürk – Lyonnaise – Precision throw Did not qualify

Stage	Date	Time	Opponent	Result
Heat 1	29 Jun 2018	19:30		11th
Heat 2	30 Jun 2018	9:30		9th

(Turkey) Burak Altay – Lyonnaise – Progressive throw Did not qualify

Stage	Date	Time	Opponent	Result
Heat 1	29 Jun 2018	9:00		7th
Heat 2	30 Jun 2018	18:30		7th

(Turkey) İbrahim Arslantaş Petanque – Precision throw Did not advance to the semifinal

Stage	Date	Time	Opponent	Result
28 Jun 2018	9:00		10th	
28 Jun 2018	Preliminary Round Match #2	15:00		4th
28 Jun 2018	Quarterfinal	17:00	(Italy) Diego Rizzi	L 24–44

(Turkey) Mustafa Yılmaz – Petanque – Precision throw Did not qualify

Stage	Date	Time	Opponent	Result
Preliminary Round Match #1	28 Jun 2018	9:00		8th
Preliminary Round Match #2	28 Jun 2018	15:00		7th

(Turkey) İbrahim Arslantaş / Mustafa Yılmaz – Petanque – Doubles Did not advance to the quarterfinal

Stage	Date	Time	Opponent	Result
Pool 1	29 Jun 2018	17:00	(France) Damien Roger Hureaui / Bruno Louis Bursicaud	L 9–13
Pool 1	29 Jun 2018	18:30	(Portugal) Riccardo Sousa / Hugo Dores	L 11–13
Pool 1	30 Jun 2018	9:00	(Algeria) Fahd Hammoudi / Mohamed Faycal Ouaghlissi	W 10–8
Pool 1	30 Jun 2018	15:00	(Tunisia) Majdi Hammamii / Mohamed Khaled Bougribalissi	L 9–13

(Turkey) Cem Şimşek – Raffa – Individual Did not advance to the quarterfinal

Stage	Date	Time	Opponent	Result
Pool 1	28 Jun 2018	9:00	(Italy) Alfonso Nanni	L 9–12
Pool 1	28 Jun 2018	15:00	(Malta) Stefan Farrugia	L 6–12
Pool 1	28 Jun 2018	19:30	(France) Eddy Marcel Pierre, Marie Rouault	L 10–11
Pool 1	29 Jun 2018	10:30	(Algeria) Mohamed Sif El Islam Belhouchet	W 12–5
Pool 1	29 Jun 2018	16:15	(Montenegro) Dejan Stepcevic	W 12–4
Pool 1	29 Jun 2018	18:45	(Libya) Rashed Mohamed Alswesi	L 6–12
Pool 1	30 Jun 2018	9:00	(San Marino) Enrico Dall'Olmo	L 9–11

=== Women ===
(Turkey) İnci Ece Öztürk – Lyonnaise – Progressive throw (gold)

Stage	Date	Time	Opponent	Result
Heat 1	29 Jun 2018	10:00		4th
Heat 2	29 Jun 2018	19:30		4th Q
Semifinal	29 Jun 2018	10:30	(Slovenia) Nina Volcina	D 32–32
Gold medal	29 Jun 2018	19:30	(France) Barbara Barthet	W 41–40

(Turkey) Seda Şenol – Lyonnaise – Precision throw Did not qualify

Stage	Date	Time	Opponent	Result
Heat 1	29 Jun 2018	10:00		11th
Heat 2	30 Jun 2018	10:00		8th

(Turkey) Gülçin Çelik – Petanque – Precision throw (silver)

Stage	Date	Time	Opponent	Result
Preliminary round Match #1	28 Jun 2018	11:00		3rd
Quarterfinal	28 Jun 2018	16:00	(Spain) Maria Jose Munoz Torregrosa	W 29–22
Semifinal	29 Jun 2018	11:00	(Tunisia) Asma belli	W 23–16
Gold match	29 Jun 2018	16:00	(Tunisia) Mouna Beji	L 9–26

(Turkey) Gamze Özgün Çağlar / Gülçin Çelik – Petanque – Doubles

Stage	Date	Time	Opponent	Result
Pool 2	29 Jun 2018	17:00	(Portugal) Silvia Ramos / Filipa Antunes	L 11–12
Pool 2	30 Jun 2018	10:00	(Portugal) Silvia Ramos / Filipa Antunes	W 9–8
Semifinal	30 Jun 2018	16:00	(France) Ludivine Edwige D'Isıdoro / Angelique Sandrine Colombet	L 0–13
Bronze medal	30 Jun 2018	19:00	(Spain) Maria Jose Munoz Torregrosa / Maria Jose Perez Adelino	L 5–12

== Boxing ==
Athlete	Event	Round of 16	Quarterfinal	Semifinal	Final	Rank
Batuhan Çiftçi	Flyweight −52 kg	BYE	(Spain) Gabriel Escobar Mascunano; L 0–5	Did not advance		–
Ali İhsan Alağaş	Bantamweight −56 kg	BYE	(Morocco) Taoufik Kashfi; W 4–0	(Albania) Krenar Zeneli; L 1–4	Did not advance	3rd place, bronze medalist(s)
Hakan Doğan	Lightweight −60 kg	BYE	(Morocco) Driss Khallouk; W 4–1	(Algeria) Reda Benbaziz; W 4–1	(France) Sofian Oumiha; L 1–4	2nd place, silver medalist(s)
Tuğrulhan Erdemir	Lightweight −64 kg	(Syria) Mohamed Kherim Musatat; W 4–1	(Algeria) Chemseddine Kramou; W 5–0	(Spain) Johann Eduardo Orozco Ojeda; W 5–0	(Morocco) Abdelhaq Nadir; W 5–0	1st place, gold medalist(s)
Onur Şipal	Welterweight −69 kg	BYE	(Syria) Abdul Mouen Azziz; W 4–1	(Spain) Youba Sissokho; L WO	Did not advance	3rd place, bronze medalist(s)
Erol Özkal	Middleweight −75 kg	(Greece) Pavlos Poulikos Tsagktakos; W 3–2	(Italy) Salvatore Cavallaro; L 1–4	Did not advance		–
Bayram Malkan	Heavyweight −81 kg	(Albania) Bekim Vjerdha; W 5–0	(Italy) Velentino Manfredoni; W 5–0	(Algeria) Mohamed Houmri; W 4–1	(Egypt) Abdelrahman Abdelgawwad; L 2–3	2nd place, silver medalist(s)
Burak Aksın	Heavyweight −91 kg	BYE	(Bosnia and Herzegovina) Elvir Sendro; W 3–2	(Italy) Aziz Abbes Mouhidine; L 0–5	Did not advance	3rd place, bronze medalist(s)
Eren Uzun	Soper heavyweight +91 kg	BYE	(Egypt) Yousry Hafez; L 0–5	Did not advance		–

== Canoeing ==
=== Men ===
Athlete	Event	Heat			Semifinal			Final		
Athlete	Event	Time	Time Diff	Rank	Time	Time Diff	Rank	Time	Time Diff	Rank
Serkan Kakkaç	K-1 – 200m	00:37.071	+00:02.375	6th	00:36.422	+00:00.460	3rd	00:37.227	+00:03.079	9th
Engin Erkan	K-1 – 500m	01:43.342	+00:04.530	5th	01:41.343	+00:00.522	2nd	01:44.595	+00:05.714	8th
Mustafa Özmen; Yavuz Selim Balcı	K-2 – 500m	01:35.441	+00:03.883	4th	01:32.044	–	1st	01:33.703	+00:05.796	6th

=== Women ===
Athlete	Event	Heat			Semifinal			Final		
Athlete	Event	Time	Time Diff	Rank	Time	Time Diff	Rank	Time	Time Diff	Rank
Lasma Liepa	K-1 – 200m	00:42.433	+00:01.566	3rd				00:41.869	+00:01.729	7th
Hilal Avcı	K-1 – 500m	01:56.414	+00:03.416	4th	01:57.847	+00:01.701	2nd	01:58.874	+00:05.237	7th

== Cycling ==
=== Men ===
Athlete	Event	Time	Difference	Rank
Ferit Can Şanlı	Individual time trial	33:30.28	+2:59	17th
Ahmet Örken	Individual time trial	31:14.47	+0:43	5th
Ahmet Örken	Road race	4:03:16	+19:26	40th
Batuhan Özgür	Road race	3:57:36	+13:46	31st
Muhammed Atalay	Road race	3:51:22	+7:32	22nd
Mustafa Köklü	Road race	DNF		–
Oğuzhan Tiryaki	Road race	4:08:53	+25:03	48th
Onur Balkan	Road race	3:51:23	+7:33	23rd
Yunus Emre Yılmaz	Road race	4:03:16	+19:26	44th
Ferit Can Şanlı	Road race	DNF		–

=== Women ===
Athlete	Event	Time	Difference	Rank
Beyza Kahveci	Individual time trial	30:57.16	+6:42	9th
Beyza Kahveci	Road race	DNF		–
Kübra Bektaş	Individual time trial	30:00.56	+5:45	8th
Kübra Bektaş	Road race	3:14:21	+38:52	24th
Ayşe Çakır	Road race	3:23:53	+48:24	26th
Cansu Çelebi	Road race	3:14:21	+38:52	25th
Esin Yılmaz	Road race	3:11:54	+36:25	23rd
Fatma Sezer	Road race	3:02:33	+27:04	20th

== Equestrian ==
Rider	Horse	Event	Round 1		Round 2		Total penalties	Rank
Rider	Horse	Event	Penalties	Time	Penalties	Time	Total penalties	Rank
Çağrı Başel	Godfried van den Aard	Individual jumping	1	77.71	14	80.59	15	36th
Derin Demirsoy	Harry K	Individual jumping	8	71.26	0	71.5	8	24th
Efe Siyahi	Call Me Princess	Individual jumping	4	74.27	4	73.4	8	24th
Ömer Faruk Karaevli	Roso Au Crosnier	Individual jumping	1	75.19	9	75.79	10	29th
Çağrı Başel	Godfried van den Aard	Team jumping	1	77.71	~~14~~	~~80.59~~	15	6th
Derin Demirsoy	Harry K	Team jumping	~~8~~	~~71.26~~	0	71.5	8	6th
Efe Siyahi	Call Me Princess	Team jumping	4	74.27	4	73.4	8	6th
Ömer Faruk Karaevli	Roso Au Crosnier	Team jumping	1	75.19	9	75.79	10	6th
Team total		Team jumping	6	27.17	13	220.69	19	6th

== Fencing ==
=== Women ===
İrem Karamete – Individual foil Did not advance to the quarterfinals

Stage	Date	Time	Opponent	Result
Pool 1	24 Jun 2018	13:12	(Spain) Maria Teresa Diaz Escolona	L 2–5
Pool 1	24 Jun 2018	13:30	(Italy) Erica Cipressa	W 5–0
Pool 1	24 Jun 2018	13:48	(Egypt) Noura Mohamed	W 5–4
Pool 1	24 Jun 2018	14:06	(Tunisia) Ines Boubakr	W 5–1
Pool 1	24 Jun 2018	14:24	(France) Jeromine Mpah Njanga	L 0–5
Pool 1	24 Jun 2018	14:42	(Portugal) Débora Nogueira	W 5–2
Round of 16	24 Jun 2018	15:45	(Egypt) Yara ElSharkawy	W 15–12
Round of 16	24 Jun 2018	16:30	(Tunisia) Ines Boubakr	L 6–15

Firuze Aysen Güneş – Individual foil Did not advance to the quarterfinals

Stage	Date	Time	Opponent	Result
Pool 2	24 Jun 2018	13:12	(France) Julie Mienville	L 0–5
Pool 2	24 Jun 2018	13:36	(Lebanon) Mona Shaito	L 2–5
Pool 2	24 Jun 2018	13:54	(Egypt) Yara Elsharkawy	L 2–5
Pool 2	24 Jun 2018	14:30	(Italy) Valentina De Costanzo	L 1–5
Pool 2	24 Jun 2018	14:48	(Greece) Aikaterini Maria Kontochristopoulou	L 0–5
Pool 2	24 Jun 2018	15:00	(Spain) Maria Jesus Marino Blanco	L 0–5
Round of 16	24 Jun 2018	15:50	(Tunisia) Ines Boubakr	L 4–15

Iryna Shchukla Çiçek – Individual sable Did not advance to the quarterfinals

Stage	Date	Time	Opponent	Result
Pool 1	25 Jun 2018	13:00	(Greece) Despoina Metaxia Geogiadou	L 2–5
Pool 1	25 Jun 2018	13:00	(Italy) Chiara Mormile	L 2–5
Pool 1	25 Jun 2018	13:00	(France) Margaux Rifkiss	W 5–4
Pool 1	25 Jun 2018	13:00	(Spain) Araceli Navarro Laso	W 5–1
Pool 1	25 Jun 2018	13:00	(Tunisia) Azza Besbes	L 3–5
Round of 16	25 Jun 2018	14:20	(Greece) Theodora Gkountoura	L 9–15

Nisanur Erbil – Individual sable Did not advance to the quarterfinals

Stage	Date	Time	Opponent	Result
Pool 2	25 Jun 2018	13:00	(Spain) Lucia MartinPortogues Barbero	L 3–5
Pool 2	25 Jun 2018	13:00	(Italy) Sofia Ciaraglia	W 5–3
Pool 2	25 Jun 2018	13:00	(Greece) Theodora Gkountoura	W 5–0
Pool 2	25 Jun 2018	13:00	(France) Sara Balzer	L 1–5
Round of 16	25 Jun 2018	14:30	(Spain) Araceli Navarro Laso	L 15–10

== Football ==
=== Men's tournament ===
Team

Goalkeepers

- Doğukan Özkan

Defenders

- Berkehan Biçer
- Muhammet Ömer Çakı
- Onur Taha Takır
- Ozan Muhammed Kabak
- Ramazan Emirhan Civelek
- Şahan Akyüz

Midfielders

- Abdussamed Karnuçu
- Atalay Babacan
- Behlül Aydın
- Hasan Ali Adıgüzel
- Okan Mete Yılmaz
- Recep Gül
- Sefa Akgün

Forwards

- Ali Yavuz Kol
- Berkay Görmez
- Fatih Bektaş
Coach: (Turkey) Şenol Ustaömer

=== Group C ===
Pos	Team	Pld	W	D	L	GF	GA	GD	Pts	Qualification
1	Greece	2	2	0	0	4	1	+3	6	Semifinals
2	France	2	1	0	1	2	3	−1	3	
3	Turkey	2	0	0	2	0	2	−2	0	

Source: Tarragona 2018

Preliminary round

22 June 2018
13:00

France	1–0	Turkey
Soumaré 88'	Report

Estadi Municipal de La Pobla de Mafumet, La Pobla de Mafumet
Referee: Srđan Jovanović (Serbia)

24 June 2018
20:00

Turkey	0–1	Greece

Estadi Municipal de Calafell, Calafell
Referee: Xavier Estrada Fernández (Spain)

== Golf ==
=== Men ===
Athlete	Event	Round 1	Round 2	Round 3	Round 4	Total		
Athlete	Event	Score Par / Rank				Score	Par	Rank
Ahmet Telli	Individual	80 +8; 28th	75 +11; 29th	73 +12; 29th	76 +16; 30th	304	+47	30th
Leon Kerem Açıkalın	Individual	72 0; 7th	79 +7; 21st	77 +12; 29th	75 +15; 28th	303	+34	28th
Taner Yamaç	Individual	71 -1; 1st	73 0; 8th	75 +3; 14th	73 +4; 13th	292	+6	13th
Ahmet Telli; Leon Kerem Açıkalın; Taner Yamaç	Team	143 -1; 2nd	291 +3; 6th	439 +7; 7th	587 +11; 27th	587	+11	27th

=== Women ===
Athlete	Event	Round 1	Round 2	Round 3	Round 4	Total		
Athlete	Event	Score	Score	Score	Score	Score	Par	Rank
Damla Bilgiç	Individual	80 +8; 19th						
Selin Timur	Individual	79 +7; 18th						
Sena Ersoy	Individual	74 +2; 9th						
Damla Bilgiç; Selin Timur; Sena Ersoy	Team							

== Gymnastics, artistic ==
=== Men ===
Athlete	Event	Floor (gymnastics)	Pommel horse	Rings (gymnastics)	Vault (gymnastics)	Uneven bars	Horizontal bar	Total	Rank
Ahmet Önder	Individual all-around	14.150	13.050	14.400	14.600	12.600	14.100	82.900	3rd place, bronze medalist(s)
Ferhat Arıcan	Individual all-around	13.300	13.750	13.300	14.300	14.600	13.300	82.550	4th
Ahmet Önder/ Ferhat Arıcan/ İbrahim Çolak/ Sercan Demir/ Ümit Şamiloğlu	Team all-around	41.000	38.350	42.700	43.150	43.550	41.250	250.000	2nd place, silver medalist(s)

Athlete	Event	Difficulty	Execution	Penalty	Total	Rank
Ahmet Önder	Floor	6.000	8.366		14.366	2nd place, silver medalist(s)
Ahmet Önder	Rings	6.000	8.366		14.366	4th
Ahmet Önder	Vault	5.200; 5.200	9.300; 9.466		14.583	2nd place, silver medalist(s)
Ahmet Önder	Parallel bars	6.200	8.833		15.033	1st place, gold medalist(s)
Ferhat Arıcan	Floor	5.000	7.433		12.433	8th
Ferhat Arıcan	Vault	5.200; 5.200	9.233; 9.033		14.333	3rd place, bronze medalist(s)
Ferhat Arıcan	Parallel bars	6.400	8.100		14.500	4th
İbrahim Çolak	Rings	6.200	9.033		15.233	1st place, gold medalist(s)
Ümit Şamiloğlu	Horizontal bar	5.900	8.166		14.066	2nd place, silver medalist(s)

=== Women ===
Athlete	Event	Balance beam	Floor (gymnastics)	Uneven bars	Vault (gymnastics)	Total	Rank
Göksu Üçtaş Şanlı	Individual all-around	10.600	12.900	10.000	14.050	47.550	12th
Tutya Yılmaz	Individual all-around	11.200	12.250	12.350	13.600	49.400	10th
Demet Mutlu/ Göksu Üçtaş Şanlı/ İlayda Şahin/ Seher Atalay/ Tutya Yılmaz	Team all-around	35.050	36.450	34.900	40.250	146.650	5th

Athlete	Event	Difficulty	Execution	Penalty	Total	Rank
Göksu Üçtaş Şanlı	Floor	4.800	8.033	−0.300	12.533	2nd place, silver medalist(s)
Göksu Üçtaş Şanlı	Vault	5.000; 4.100	8.866; 8.833		13.399	4th
Tutya Yılmaz	Parallel bars	4.600	7.433		12.033	6th

== Gymnastics, rhythmic ==
Qualification

Gymnast	Ball (rhythmic gymnastics)	Hoop (rhythmic gymnastics)	Clubs (rhythmic gymnastics)	Ribbon (rhythmic gymnastics)	Total	Position
Derya Demörs						
Kamelya Tuncel						
Zeynep Kırlı						

Final

== Handball ==
=== Men's tournament ===
Turkey men's team ranked 4th.

Team
- Yunus Özmusul
- Baran Nalbantoğlu
- Coşkun Göktepe
- Özgür Sarak
- Görkem Biçer
- Taner Günay
- Onur Ersin
- Mehmet Demirezen
- Alp Eren Pektaş
- Çağlayan Öztürk
- Halil İbrahim Öztürk
- Doruk Pehlivan
- Enes Gümüşok
- Uğur Erceylan
- Durmuş Ali Tınkır
- Ozan Arifoğlu
Coach:

Preliminary round
Group D

Pos	Team	Pld	W	D	L	GF	GA	GD	Pts	Qualification
1	Turkey	3	2	1	0	84	74	+10	5	Quarterfinals
2	Serbia	3	1	1	1	95	88	+7	3	Quarterfinals
3	Egypt	3	1	0	2	91	102	−11	2 (Note: Egypt 34–29 Macedonia)	
4	North Macedonia	3	1	0	2	86	92	−6	2	

Source: Tarragona 2018
Rules for classification: 1) Points; 2) Head-to-head points; 3) Head-to-head goal difference; 4) Head-to-head goals scored; 5) Goal difference; 6) Goals scored; 7) Draw.
Notes:

23 June 2018; 16:30	North Macedonia	26–29	Turkey	Campolara
23 June 2018; 16:30		(13–15, 13–14)		Campolara

24 June 2018; 18:30	Serbia	24–24	Turkey	Campolara
24 June 2018; 18:30		(13–14, 11–10)		Campolara

25 June 2018; 16:30	Egypt	24–31	Turkey	Campolara
25 June 2018; 16:30		(13–15, 11–16)		Campolara

Quarterfinal

27 June 2018; 20:00	Turkey	31–29	Portugal	Campolara
27 June 2018; 20:00		(17–12, 14–17)		Campolara

Semifinal

29 June 2018; 10:30	Tunisia	28–21	Turkey	Campolara
29 June 2018; 10:30		(15–8, 13–13)		Campolara

=== Women's tournament ===
Turkey women's team ranked 5th.

Team
- Halime Beykurt
- Yaren Berfe Göker
- Merve Durdu
- Fatma Gül Sakızcan
- Yasemin Şahin
- Kübra Sarıkaya
- Sibel Karameke
- Betül Yılmaz
- Döne Gül Bozdoğan
- Keziban Kabak
- Beyza Karaçam
- Gülsüm Güleçyüz
- Yasemin Güler
- Ceren Coşkun
- Nurceren Akgün Göktepe
- Cansu Akalın
- Neslihan Çalışkan
- Aslı İskit
Coach: (Turkey) Birol Ünsal

Preliminary round
Group B

Pos	Team	Pld	W	D	L	GF	GA	GD	Pts	Qualification
1	Montenegro	4	4	0	0	132	85	+47	8	Semifinals
2	North Macedonia	4	3	0	1	108	96	+12	6	Semifinals
3	Turkey	4	2	0	2	121	127	−6	4	5th place game
4	Serbia	4	1	0	3	108	118	−10	2	7th place game
5	Egypt	4	0	0	4	91	134	−43	0	

Source: Tarragona 2018
Rules for classification: 1) Points; 2) Head-to-head points; 3) Head-to-head goal difference; 4) Head-to-head goals scored; 5) Goal difference; 6) Goals scored; 7) Draw.

23 June 2018; 12:00	Turkey	26–31	North Macedonia	Club d'Esports Vendrell Pavilion
23 June 2018; 12:00		(11–15, 15–16)		Club d'Esports Vendrell Pavilion

24 June 2018; 12:00	Montenegro	34–21	Turkey	Club d'Esports Vendrell Pavilion
24 June 2018; 12:00		(17–12, 17–9)		Club d'Esports Vendrell Pavilion

27 June 2018; 10:00	Turkey	41–30	Egypt	Club d'Esports Vendrell Pavilion
27 June 2018; 10:00		(22–12, 19–18)		Club d'Esports Vendrell Pavilion

28 June 2018; 10:00	Serbia	32–33	Turkey	Club d'Esports Vendrell Pavilion
28 June 2018; 10:00		(15–15, 17–18)		Club d'Esports Vendrell Pavilion

Rank for 5–6

29 June 2018; 20:00	Italy	22–27	Turkey	Club d'Esports Vendrell Pavilion
29 June 2018; 20:00		(10–12, 12–15)		Club d'Esports Vendrell Pavilion

== Judo ==
=== Men ===
Athlete	Event	Round of 16	Quarterfinal	Semifinal	Repechage 1	Repechage 2	Final / BM	Rank
Bekir Özlü	Extra-lightweight −60 kg	BYE	(Slovenia) David Štarkel; W 1–0, 0–0, 0–0	(Tunisia) Fredj Dhouibi; L 0–1, 1–0, 0–0	—N/a		(France) Jolan Florimont; W 0–1, 1–0, 0–0	3rd place, bronze medalist(s)
Sinan Sandal	Half-lightweight −66 kg	BYE	(Egypt) Mohamed Abdelmawgoud; L 0–1, 0–0, 0–0	—N/a	(Cyprus) Christos Trikomitis; W 1–0, 0–0, 0–0	(Bosnia and Herzegovina) Petar Zadro; W 1–0, 0–0, 0–0	(Morocco) Imad Bassou; L 0–1, 0–1, 0–0	4th
Bilal Çiloğlu	Lightweight −73 kg	(Montenegro) Nikola Gardašević; W 1–0, 0–0, 0–0	(Slovenia) Martin Hojak; W 1–0, 0–0, 0–0	(Italy) Fabio Basile; W 1–0, 0–0, 0–0	—N/a		(Kosovo) Akil Gjakova; L 0–1, 0–0, 0–0	2nd place, silver medalist(s)
Vedat Albayrak	Half-middleweight −81 kg	BYE	(Spain) Alfonso Urqyiza Solano; L 0–0, 0–1, 0–0	—N/a	(France) Alpha Oumar Djalo; L 1–0, 0–0, 0–0	—N/a	Did not advance	–
Batuhan Eremgil	Middleweight −90 kg	(Slovenia) David Kukovica; W 1–0, 0–0, 0–0	(Spain) Nikoloz Sherazadishvili Sakvarelidze; L 0–1, 1–0, 0–0	—N/a		(Tunisia) Oussama Mahmoud Snoussi; L 0–1, 0–0, 0–0	Did not advance	–
Feyyaz Yazıcı	Half-heavyweight −100 kg	(France) Hamze Ouchani; W 0–0, 1–0, 0–0	(Italy) Vincenzo D'Arco; L 0–1, 0–0, 0–0	—N/a	(Algeria) Mohamed El Amine Tayeb; L 0–1, 0–0, 0–0	—N/a	Did not advance	–
Ali Erdoğan	Heavyweight +100 kg	(Bosnia and Herzegovina) Milos Mandic; L 0–0, 0–1, 0–0	Did not advance					–

=== Women ===
Athlete	Event	Round of 16	Quarterfinal	Semifinal	Repechage 1	Repechage 2	Final / BM	Rank
Dilara Lokmanhekim	Extra-lightweight −48 kg	(Tunisia) Olfa Saoudi; W 1–0, 1–0, 0–0	(Portugal) Joana Diogo; W 1–0, 0–1, 0–0	(Serbia) Milica Nikolić; L 0–1, 0–0, 0–0	—N/a		(Slovenia) Marusa Stangar; L 0–1, 0–0, 0–0	4th
İrem Korkmaz	Half-lightweight −52 kg	BYE	(Algeria) Meriem Moussa; W 0–0, 1–0, 0–0	(Kosovo) Distria Krasniqi; L 0–1, 0–0, 0–0	—N/a		(Slovenia) Anja Stangar; W 1–0, 0–0, 0–0	3rd place, bronze medalist(s)
Nazlıcan Özerler	Lightweight −57 kg	(Algeria) Yamina Halata; L 0 -1, 0–0, 0–0	Did not advance					–
Büşra Katipoğlu	Half-middleweight −63 kg	BYE	(Spain) Maria Isabel Puche Palao; W 0 -0, 1–0, 0–0	(Italy) Edwige Gwend Jeanne; L 0 -0, 0–1, 0–0	—N/a		(Kosovo) Fazliu Laura; W 1 -0, 0–0, 0–0	3rd place, bronze medalist(s)
Nurcan Yılmaz	Middleweight −70 kg	(France) Margaux Florence Pinot; L 0–1, 0–1, 0–0	—N/a		(Morocco) Assmaa Niang; W 1–0, 0–0, 0–0	(Slovenia) Anka Pogacnik; W 0–0, 1–0, 0–0	(Bosnia and Herzegovina) Aleksanfra Samardzic; W 1–0, 0–0, 0–0	3rd place, bronze medalist(s)
Kayra Almira Sayit	Heavyweight +78 kg	BYE	(Italy) Analisa Calagreti; W 1–0, 0–0, 0–0	(Spain) Sara Alvarez Folguera; W 1–0, 0–0, 0–0	—N/a		(Tunisia) Nihel Cheikhrouhoui; W 1–0, 1–0, 0–0	1st place, gold medalist(s)

== Karate ==
=== Men ===
Athlete	Event	Round of 16	Quarterfinal	Semifinal	Repechage	Final / BM	Rank
Eray Şamdan	-60 kg	(Syria) Mohammad Darwish; W 8–0	(Morocco) Abdessalam Ameknassi; D 0–0	—N/a	(North Macedonia) Emil Pavlov; W 3–1	—N/a	3rd place, bronze medalist(s)
Burak Uygur	-67 kg	BYE	(North Macedonia) Nenad Kelebikj; W 4–3	(Portugal) Joaquim Mendes; W 2–0	—N/a	(France) Marvin Cedric Garin; L 0–5	2nd place, silver medalist(s)
Erman Eltemur	-75 kg	(Egypt) Karim Younise; D 0–0	(Spain) Rodrigo Ibanrz Saenz Torre; W 4–0	(Algeria) Oualid Bouabaoub; W 3–0	—N/a	(Croatia) Enes Garibović; D 0–0	
Uğur Aktaş	-84 kg	(Egypt) Ahmed Elmasry; L 0–5	Did not advance				
Rıdvan Kaptan	+84 kg	(Spain) Babacar Seck Sakho; D 3–3	(France) Ilyes Klouz; L 2–3	Did not advance			

=== Women ===
Athlete	Event	Round of 16	Quartelfinal	Semifinal	Repechage	Final / BM	Rank
Serap Özçelik Arapoğlu	-50 kg	BYE	(Spain) Rocio Sanchez Estepa; D 0–0	(Morocco) Aicha Sayah; L 1–2	(Tunisia) Eya Jemai; W 7–2	—N/a	3rd place, bronze medalist(s)
Tuba Yakan	55 kg	(North Macedonia) Simona Zaborska; W 2–1	(Italy) Sara Cardin; W 1–0	(Spain) Carlota Fernandez Osorio; W 2–0	—N/a	(Montenegro) Ana Draskovic; W 2–0	1st place, gold medalist(s)
Merve Çoban	-61 kg	(France) Leïla Heurtault; D 0–0	did not advance				
Eda Eltemur	-68 kg	(Morocco) Fatima-Zahra Errabi; W 1–0	(Serbia) Sanja Cvrkota; W 4–0	(Slovenia) Lina Pusnik; L 1–7	(Italy) Silvia Semeraro; L 0–2	—N/a	4th
Meltem Hocaoğlu	+68 kg	(Tunisia) Chahnez Jami; D 0–0	(Egypt) Aisha Mohamed; W 5–0	(Greece) Eleni Chatziliadou; L 2–3	(Croatia) Ana-Marija Bujas Celan; W 3–0	—N/a	3rd place, bronze medalist(s)

== Rowing ==
Athlete	Event	Heat	Repechage	Semifinal	Final	Rank
Fatih Ünsal	Lightweight Men's Single Sculls (LM1x)	03:19.672 +00:02.764; 3rd	03:24.268; 1st	03:27.005 +00:05.049; 4th	03:33.911 +00:01.330; 2nd	7th
Enes Yenipazarlı; Bayram Sönmez	Lightweight Men's Double Sculls (LM2x)	—N/a	03:15.691 +00:05.233; 4th	—N/a	03:15.213 +00:00.683; 2nd	–
Selahattin Gürsoy; Fuad Rafail	Men's Double Sculls (M2x)	03:17.198 +00:21.464; 4th	03:16.246 +00:04.812; 3rd	—N/a	03:12.962 +00:02.216; 2nd	–

== Sailing ==
=== Men ===
Athlete	Event	Race											Net points	Final rank
Athlete	Event	1	2	3	4	5	6	7	8	9	10	M*	Net points	Final rank
Alp Rodopman	Laser Standard	13	10	21 DNF	17	15	17	12	21 DNE	11	3	5	140	15th
Berkay Abay	Laser Standard	12	15	15	16	11	15	14	15	17	16	18	146	17th
Onur Cavit Biriz	RS:X	9	10	11	10	11	12	10	10	8	9	11	100	10th

=== Women ===
Athlete	Event	Race											Net points	Final rank
Athlete	Event	1	2	3	4	5	6	7	8	9	10	M*	Net points	Final rank
Nazlı Çağla Dönertaş	Laser Radial	3	2	6	8	2	3	4	8	11	10	4	57	5th
Ecem Güzel	Laser Radial	6	8	10	16 DSQ	9	5	1	2	5	6	8	68	8th
Dilara Uralp	RS:X	7	4	5	6	5	8	5	13 OCS	8	8	2	69	7th

Coaches
(Croatia) Joško Lalić, (Poland) Jaroslaw Mierczyński, (Poland) Jonasz Stelmaszyk.

== Shooting ==
=== Men ===
Athlete	Event	Total	Rank
Yusuf Dikec	10 m air pistol		
İsmail Keleş	10 m air pistol		
Ömer Akgün	10 m air rifle		
Oğuzhan Tüzün	Trap		
Nedim Tolga Tuncer	Trap		

=== Women ===
Athlete	Event	Total	Rank
Canan Türkoğlu Yavuz	10 m air pistol		
Şeymanur Koca	10 m air rifle		
Safiye Sarıtürk	Trap		

== Swimming ==
=== Men ===
Athlete	Event	Heats		Final	
Athlete	Event	Time	Rank	Time	Rank
Berkay Ömer Öğretir	50 m breaststroke	29.08 SB	5th	DNQ	13th
Berkay Ömer Öğretir	100 m breaststroke	1:01.68	3rd	1:00.95	3rd place, bronze medalist(s)
Berkay Ömer Öğretir	200 m breaststroke	2:17.92	4th	DNQ	9th
Efe Turan	400 m freestyle	3:56.64	6th	DNQ	11th
Ege Başer	50 m backstroke	27.51	6th	DNQ	17th
Ege Başer	100 m backstroke	57.32	3rd	DNQ	10th
Ege Başer	200 m backstroke	2:06.12	4th	DNQ	14th
Erge Can Gezmiş	200 m butterfly	2:11.48	5th	DNQ	16th
Erge Can Gezmiş	200 m freestyle	1:50.73	3rd	1:50.80	7th
Erge Can Gezmiş	400 m freestyle	DNS			–
Ümit Can Güreş	50 m butterfly	23.70	1st	23.75	4th
Ümit Can Güreş	100 m butterfly	52.85	1st	52.53	3rd place, bronze medalist(s)
Samet Alkan	200 m butterfly	2:02.34	3rd	DNQ	9th
Samet Alkan	200 m medley	2:04.42	3rd	DNQ	9th
Samet Alkan	400 m medley	4:28.54	4th	4:26.86	6th
Alpkan Örnek	200 m medley	2:04.89	4th	DNQ	11th
Alpkan Örnek	400 m medley	4:29.78	4th	4:26.86	9th
Doğa Çelik	200 m freestyle	1:52.26	4th	DNQ	14th
Kemal Arda Gürdal	100 m freestyle	50.30	3rd	DNQ	9th
Hüseyin Emre Sakçı	50 m breaststroke	27.92	1st	27.48	4th
Hüseyin Emre Sakçı	50 m freestyle	22.97	3rd	DNQ	9th
Hüseyin Emre Sakçı	100 m breaststroke	1:02.32	10th	DNQ	10th
Berk Özkul	50 m butterfly	24.79	4th	DNQ	11th
Berk Özkul	100 m butterfly	54.19	5th	53.83	7th
Berk Özkul	200 m backstroke	2:05.09	5th	SNQ	10th
Yalım Acımış	50 m freestyle	23.21	4th	DNQ	13th
Yalım Acımış	100 m freestyle	50.71	4th	DNQ	11th
Nezir Karap	1500 m freestyle	—N/a		15:56.04	8th
İskender Başlakov	50 m backstroke	26.62	5th	DNQ	12th
İskender Başlakov; Kemal Arda Gürdal; Yalım Acımış; Hüseyin Emre Sakçı	4 × 100 m freestyle relay	—N/a		3:20.72	3rd place, bronze medalist(s)
Ege Başer; Ümit Can Güreş; Kemal Arda Gürdal; Hüseyin Emre Sakçı	4 × 100 m medley relay	—N/a		3:39.38	3rd place, bronze medalist(s)
Efe Turan; Erge Can Gezmiş; Alpkan Örnek; Doğa Çelik	4 × 200 m freestyle relay	—N/a		7:34.24	6th

=== Women ===
Athlete	Event	Heat		Final	
Athlete	Event	Time	Rank	Time	Rank
Viktoriya Zeynep Güneş	50 m breaststroke	32.42	6th	DNQ	9th
Viktoriya Zeynep Güneş	100 m butterfly	DNS			–
Viktoriya Zeynep Güneş	100 m breaststroke	1:10.76	4th	1:09.68	5th
Viktoriya Zeynep Güneş	200 m breaststroke	2:28.80	3rd	2:26.92	3rd place, bronze medalist(s)
Viktoriya Zeynep Güneş	200 m medley	2:15.60	3rd	2:13.19	2nd place, silver medalist(s)
Viktoriya Zeynep Güneş	400 m medley	4:44.43	3rd	4:42.54	5th
Ekaterina Ivanova Avramova	50 m backstroke	29.04	2nd	28.74	4th
Ekaterina Ivanova Avramova	100 m backstroke	1:01.66	1st	1:01.16	3rd place, bronze medalist(s)
Ekaterina Ivanova Avramova	200 m backstroke	—N/a		2:13.43	3rd place, bronze medalist(s)
Nida Eliz Üstündağ	200 m butterfly	2:12.82	1st	2:12.07	6th
Gülşen Beste Samancı	50 m breaststroke	31.92	4th	31.73	6th
Gülşen Beste Samancı	100 m breaststroke	1:09.92	3rd	1:10.92	8th
Aleyna Özkan	50 m butterfly	26.84	3rd	26.91	6th
Aleyna Özkan	100 m butterfly	1:00.27	2nd	1:00.71	8th
Selen Özbilen	50 m freestyle	26.09	4th	DNQ	12th
Selen Özbilen	100 m freestyle	56.29	2nd	56.16	6th
Selen Özbilen	200 m freestyle	DNS			–
Gizem Bozkurt	200 m medley	DNS			–
Beril Böcekler	200 m freestyle	2:06.56	3rd	DNQ	13th
Beril Böcekler	400 m freestyle	4:20.44	6th	DNQ	11th
Beril Böcekler	800 m freestyle	8:52.97	3rd	DNQ	11th
Sezin Eligün	50 m backstroke	30.17	6th	DNQ	9th
Sezin Eligün	50 m butterfly	27.53	5th	DNQ	10th
Sezin Eligün	50 m freestyle	26.75	5th	DNQ	14th
Sezin Eligün	100 m freestyle	57.33	5th	DNQ	13th
Viktoriya Zeynep Güneş; Ekaterina Ivanova Avramova; Sezin Eligün; Selen Özbilen	4 × 100 m freestyle relay	—N/a		3:44.94	5th
Viktoriya Zeynep Güneş; Ekaterina Ivanova Avramova; Aleyna Özkan; Selen Özbilen	4 × 100 m medley relay	—N/a		4:08.27	4th
Gizem Bozkurt; Nida Eliz Üstündağ; Selen Özbilen; Beril Böcekler	4 × 200 m freestyle relay	—N/a		8:21.60	6th

=== Paralympic Swimming ===
Athlete	Event	Heat		Final	
Athlete	Event	Time	Rank	Time	Rank
Uğurcan Özer	Men's 100 metres freestyle S10	1:00.32	5th	1:00.01	7th

== Table tennis ==
=== Men ===
Round robin

Athlete	Event	Stage	Match #1	Match #2	Match #3	Qualification
Ahmet Li	Singles	Group C	(Italy) Mihai Razvan Bobocica; L 0–4	(Algeria) Larbi Bouriah; W 4–0	—N/a	D 1–1
Ahmet Li	Singles	Group J	(Slovenia) Darko Jorgic; L 0–4	(Algeria) Sami Kherouf; L WO-4	(France) Alexandre François Robinot; L WO-4	L 0–3; Did not advance
İbrahim Gündüz	Singles	Group H	(Greece) Panagiotis Konstantinopoulos; W 4–0	(Spain) Jesus Cantero Juncal; W 4–3	(Kosovo) Fatih Karabaxhak; W 4-WO	W 3–0
İbrahim Gündüz	Singles	Group I	(Cyprus) Marios Yiangou; W 4–2	(Egypt) Omar Assar; L 3–4	(Portugal) Diago Carvalho; L 1–4	L 1–2; Did not advance

Athlete	Event	Stage	Match #1	Match #2	Match #3	Match #4	Match #5	Qualification
Abdullah Talha Yiğenler/ İbrahim Gündüz	Team	Group C	İbrahim Gündüz; L 1–3 (Italy) Niagol Ivanov Stoyanov	Abdullah Talha Yiğenler; L 0–3 (Italy) Mihai Razvan Bobocica	Gündüz/ Yiğenler; L 1–3 (Italy) Rech Daldosso/ Stoyanov	—N/a		L 0–3
Abdullah Talha Yiğenler/ İbrahim Gündüz	Team	Group C	İbrahim Gündüz; W 3–0 (Cyprus) Hristo Angelov Hristonov	Abdullah Talha Yiğenler; L 1–3 (Cyprus) Marios Yiangou	Gündüz/ Yiğenler; W 3–1 (Cyprus) Hristonov/ Yiangou	İbrahim Gündüz; W 3–2 (Cyprus) Marios Yiangou	—N/a	W 3–1; Advanced

Knockout

Athlete	Event	Quarterfinal	Semifinal	Final/BM	Rank
İbrahim Gündüz	Singles	(Italy) Mihai Razvan Bobocica; W 4–3	(Slovenia) Darko Jorgic; L 1–4	(France) Alexandre François Robinot; W 4-DSQ	3rd place, bronze medalist(s)

Athlete	Event	Stage	Match #1	Match #2	Match #3	Match #4	Match #5	Qualification
Abdullah Talha Yiğenler/ İbrahim Gündüz	Team	Quarterfinal	Abdullah Talha Yiğenler; L 2–3 (Slovenia) Bojan Tokic	İbrahim Gündüz; L 0–3 (Slovenia) Darko Jorgic	Gündüz/ Yiğenler; L 0–3 (Slovenia) Jorgic/ Tokic	—N/a		>L 0–3; Did not advance

=== Women ===
Round robin

Athlete	Event	Stage	Match #1	Match #2	Match #3	Qualification
Özge Yılmaz	Singles	Group B	(Spain) Maria Xiao; L 0–4	(Algeria) Lynda Loghraibi; W 4–0	—N/a	D 1–1
Özge Yılmaz	Singles	Group I	(Monaco) Xiaoxin Yang; L 0–4	(Italy) Chiara Colantoni; L 2–4	(Egypt) Dina Meshref; L 0–4	L 0–3; Did not advance
Sibel Altınkaya	Singles	Group G	(Albania) Kamela Katillari; W 4–0	(Slovenia) Alex Galic; L 0–4	(Serbia) Aneta Maksuti; W 4–1	W 2–1
Sibel Altınkaya	Singles	Group J	(Spain) Maria Xiao; L 2–4	(Serbia) Izabela Lupulesku; L 1–4	(France) Stephanie Nathalie Loeuillette; L 0–4	L 0–3; Did not advance

Athlete	Event	Stage	Match #1	Match #2	Match #3	Match #4	Match #5	Qualification
Gülpembe Özkaya/ Özge Yılmaz/ Sibel Altınkaya	Team	Group D	Özge Yılmaz; L 1–3 (Italy) Chiara Colantoni	Sibel Altınkaya; L 1–3 (Italy) Jamila Laurenti	Yılmaz/ Altınkaya; W 3–2 (Italy) Piccolin/ Colantoni	Sibel Altınkaya; W 3–0 (Italy) Chiara Colantoni	Özge Yılmaz; W 3–0 (Italy) Jamila Laurenti	W 3–2
Gülpembe Özkaya/ Özge Yılmaz/ Sibel Altınkaya	Team	Group D	Sibel Altınkaya; W 3–0 (Tunisia) Fadwa Garci	Özge Yılmaz; W 3–1 (Tunisia) Abir Haj Salah	Özkaya/ Yılmaz; W 3–0 (Tunisia) Haj Salah/ Saidani	—N/a		W 3–0; Advanced

Knockout

Athlete	Event	Stage	Match #1	Match #2	Match #3	Match #4	Match #5	Qualification
Gülpembe Özkaya/ Özge Yılmaz/ Sibel Altınkaya	Team	Quarterfinal	Sibel Altınkaya; W 3–1 (Slovenia) Ana Tofant	Özge Yılmaz; L 2–3 (Slovenia) Alex Galic	Altınkaya/ Yılmaz; L 2–3 (Slovenia) Galic/ Tofant	Sibel Altınkaya; W 3–0 (Slovenia) Alex Galic	Özge Yılmaz; W 2–3 (Slovenia) Ana Tofant	W 3–2; Advanced
Gülpembe Özkaya/ Özge Yılmaz/ Sibel Altınkaya	Team	Semifinal	Özge Yılmaz; L 0–3 (Greece) Aikaterini Toliou	Sibel Altınkaya; W 3–2 (Greece) Giorgia Zavitsanou	Altınkaya/ Yılmaz; W 3–0 (Greece) Toliou/ Zavitsanou	Sibel Altınkaya; W 3–1 (Greece) Aikaterini Toliou	—N/a	W 3–1; Advanced
Gülpembe Özkaya/ Özge Yılmaz/ Sibel Altınkaya	Team	Final	Özge Yılmaz; L 0–3 (Spain) Maria Xiao	Sibel Altınkaya; L 2–3 (Spain) Galia Dvorak	Özkaya/ Yılmaz; L 0–3 (Spain) Dvorak/ Xiao	—N/a		L 0–3 (silver)

== Taekwondo ==
Legend

- OT — Won on over time (Golden Point)
- PTG — Won by Points Gap
- SUP — Won by superiority

=== Men ===
Athlete	Event	Round of 16	Quarterfinals	Semifinals	Final / BM	Rank
Deniz Dağdelen	Flyweight −58 kg	(Morocco) Amine Elhamrazi; W 21 (OT)-18	(Portugal) Rui Bragança; L 17-26	Did not advance		-
Hakan Reçber	Lightweight −68 kg	(Kosovo) Qendrim Sejfijaj; W 29 (PTG)-6	(France) Dylan Chellamootooj; W 22-21	(Greece) Konstantinos Chamalidis; L 9-12	—N/a	3rd place, bronze medalist(s)
Yunus Sarı	Middleweight −80 kg	(Bosnia and Herzegovina) Karlo Galić; W 6-0	(Italy) Roberto Botta; W 10-7	(Egypt) Seif Eissa; L 6-16	—N/a	3rd place, bronze medalist(s)
Emre Kutalmış Ateşli	Heavyweight +80 kg	BYE	(Egypt) Mohamed Abdelmawgood; W 13-10	(Spain) Daniel Ros Gomez; L 13-19	—N/a	3rd place, bronze medalist(s)

=== Women ===
Athlete	Event	Round of 16	Quarterfinals	Semifinals	Final / BM	Rank
Rukiye Yıldırım	Flyweight −49 kg	BYE	(Tunisia) Ikram Dhahri; W 24-9	(Morocco) Oumaima El Souchti; W 33-15	(Croatia) Kristina Tomic; W 12-11	1st place, gold medalist(s)
İrem Yaman	Lightweight −57 kg	BYE	(France) Laurygan Celin; W 16-4	(Spain) Marta Calvo; W 7-3	(Egypt) Radwa Elsayed Nada; W 8-0	1st place, gold medalist(s)
Nafia Kuş	Heavyweight +67 kg	BYE	(Algeria) Linda Azzeddine; W 12-1	(Serbia) Ana Bajić; L 1-1 (SUP)	—N/a	3rd place, bronze medalist(s)

== Tennis ==
=== Men ===
Athlete	Event	Qualification	Quarterfinal	Semifinal	Final / BM	Rank
Altuğ Çelikbilek	Singles	(Cyprus) Menelaos Efstathiou; L 6-7, 1-6	Did not advance			-
Anıl Yüksel	Singles	(Portugal) Bernardo Saraiva; L 7-6, 2-6, 4-6	Did not advance			-
Sarp Ağabigün/ Anıl Yüksel	Doubles	BYE	(Lebanon) Hady Habib/ Giovani Samaha; W 6-3, 6-4	(Tunisia) Aziz Dougaz/ Anis Ghorbel; L 5-7, 6-1, 8-10	(Portugal) Gonçalo Falcão/ Bernardo Saraiva; W 6-2, 3-6, 11-9	3rd place, bronze medalist(s)

=== Women ===
Athlete	Event	Qualification	Quarterfinal	Semifinal	Final / BM	Rank
Başak Eraydın	Singles	BYE		(Italy) Lucia Bronzetti; W 6-3, 7-3	(France) Fiona Ferroi; W 6-7, 6-3, 6-3	1st place, gold medalist(s)
Berfu Cengiz	Singles	(Tunisia) Chiraz Bechri; L 4-6, 2-6	Did not advance			-
Başak Eraydın/ İpek Öz	Doubles	BYE	(Italy) Lucia Bronzetti/ Lucrezia Stefanini; W 6-1, 6-0	(Spain) Marina Bassols Ribera/ Eva Guerrero Álvarez; W 6-2, 6-1	(Bosnia and Herzegovina) Nefisa Berberović/ Dea Herdželaš; W 0-6, 6-3, 12-10	1st place, gold medalist(s)

== Triathlon ==
=== Men ===
Individual sprint

Triathlete	Swim	Bike	Run	Total time	Difference	Rank
Emirhan Altıntaş	00:10:47.748 16th	00:08:54.619 15th 00:09:16.727 17th 00:09:22.950 18th 00:09:17.081 17th	00:09:12.375 18th 00:09:49.341 18th	01:07:34.863	00:10:06.991	18th
Gültigin Er	00:10:16.636 13th	00:09:01.422 14th 00:08:50.137 13th 00:08:47.719 15th 00:08:59.686 15th	00:08:39.856 15th 00:09:42.133 16th	01:05:13.044	00:07:45.172	16th

=== Women ===
Individual sprint

Triathlete	Swim	Bike	Run	Total time	Difference	Rank
Esra Nur Gökçek	00:10:26.138 6th	00:09:30.971 7th 00:09:34.991 7th 00:09:49.698 7th 00:10:09.998 7th	00:09:41.421 7th 00:10:32.554 7th	01:10:48.048	00:05:56.217	7th
İpek Öztosun	00:11:33.901 8th	00:10:09.558 8th 00:10:17.410 8th 00:10:30.438 8th 00:10:26.651 8th	00:09:29.683 8th 00:10:40.883 8th	01:14:08.783	00:09:16.952	8th

== Volleyball ==
=== Men's tournament ===
Turkey men's national volleyball team ranked 7th.

Team
- Abdullah Çam
- Adis Lagumdzija
- Baturalp Burak Güngör
- Burak Mert
- Gökhan Gökgöz
- İlkin Aydın
- Mert Matic
- Metin Toy
- Murat Yenipazar
- Mustafa Koç
- Muzaffer Yönet
- Vahit Emre Savaş
- Yasin Aydın
Coach:

Preliminary round
Group D

Pos	Team	Pld	W	L	Pts	SW	SL	SR	SPW	SPL	SPR	Qualification
1	Turkey	2	2	0	5	6	2	3.000	189	147	1.286	Quarterfinals
2	Tunisia	2	1	1	4	5	3	1.667	179	169	1.059	Quarterfinals
3	Albania	2	0	2	0	0	6	0.000	98	150	0.653	

Date	Time		Score		Set 1	Set 2	Set 3	Set 4	Set 5	Total	Report
23 Jun	16:00	Albania	0–3	Turkey	22–25	4–25	17–25			43–75	P2
24 Jun	19:00	Turkey	3–2	Tunisia	25–19	21–25	25–18	28–30	15–12	114–104	P2

Classification 5–8

Date	Time		Score		Set 1	Set 2	Set 3	Set 4	Set 5	Total	Report
29 Jun	10:00	Croatia	3–2	Turkey	23–25	25–20	23–25	25–21	15–10	111–101	P2

7th place game

Date	Time		Score		Set 1	Set 2	Set 3	Set 4	Set 5	Total	Report
30 Jun	13:00	Turkey	3–2	France	19–25	25–20	26–28	25–18	15–10	110–101	P2

=== Women's tournament ===
Turkey women's national volleyball team - (bronze)

Team
- Aslı Kalaç
- Aslıhan Kılıç
- Buse Ünal
- Melis Durul
- Melisa Memiş
- Mislina Yağmur Kılıç
- Özge Nur Yurdagülen
- Saliha Şahin
- Tuğba Şenoğlu
- Yasemin Güveli
Coach:

Preliminary round
Group B

Pos	Team	Pld	W	L	Pts	SW	SL	SR	SPW	SPL	SPR	Qualification
1	Turkey	2	2	0	6	6	2	3.000	196	172	1.140	Quarterfinals
2	Spain	2	1	1	3	4	3	1.333	167	161	1.037	Quarterfinals
3	Bosnia and Herzegovina	2	0	2	0	1	6	0.167	139	169	0.822	

Date	Time		Score		Set 1	Set 2	Set 3	Set 4	Set 5	Total	Report
22 Jun	10:00	Turkey	3–1	Bosnia and Herzegovina	25–22	25–15	19–25	25–18		94–80	P2
24 Jun	19:00	Turkey	3–1	Spain	26–24	26–28	25–19	25–21		102–92	P2

Quarterfinals

Date	Time		Score		Set 1	Set 2	Set 3	Set 4	Set 5	Total	Report
28 Jun	16:00	Turkey	3–1	Italy	22–25	25–16	25–16	25–23		97–80	P2

Semifinals

Date	Time		Score		Set 1	Set 2	Set 3	Set 4	Set 5	Total	Report
29 Jun	19:00	Turkey	2–3	Croatia	25–22	15–25	25–20	21–25	12–15	98–107	P2

Third place game

Date	Time		Score		Set 1	Set 2	Set 3	Set 4	Set 5	Total	Report
30 Jun	16:00	France	1–3	Turkey	26–24	25–27	14–25	19–25		84–101	P2

== Water polo ==
=== Men's tournament ===
Turkey men's national water polo team ranked 8th.

Team
- Ali Can Yılmaz
- Berk Bıyık
- Ege Kahraman
- Emirhan Özdemir
- Eray Turan
- Hüseyin Kağan Kil
- Nadir Sönmez
- Oğuz Berke Seneoğlu
- Osman Selim Gülenç
- Selçuk Can Caner
- Tugay Ergin
Coach:

Preliminary round

Group B

Pos	Team	Pld	W	W+	L+	L	GF	GA	GD	Pts	Qualification
1	Greece	3	2	0	1	0	35	16	+19	7	Final
2	Spain (H)	3	2	0	0	1	30	15	+15	6	3rd place game
3	Italy	3	1	1	0	1	40	20	+20	5	5th place game
4	Turkey	3	0	0	0	3	10	64	−54	0	7th place game

Source: Tarragona 2018
(H) Host

27 June 2018; 20:50	Report	Spain	20–5	Turkey	Campclar Aquatic Center, Tarragona
27 June 2018; 20:50	Report	Score by quarters: 3–0, 5–2, 7–3, 5–0			Campclar Aquatic Center, Tarragona
27 June 2018; 20:50	Report	Tahull 4	Goals	Bıyık 2	Campclar Aquatic Center, Tarragona

28 June 2018; 18:40	Report	Italy	23–3	Turkey	Campclar Aquatic Center, Tarragona
28 June 2018; 18:40	Report	Score by quarters: 7–0, 5–1, 4–1, 7–1			Campclar Aquatic Center, Tarragona
28 June 2018; 18:40	Report	Gallo, Echenique 4	Goals	three players 1	Campclar Aquatic Center, Tarragona

29 June 2018; 18:40	Report	Greece	21–2	Turkey	Campclar Aquatic Center, Tarragona
29 June 2018; 18:40	Report	Score by quarters: 8–0, 3–1, 7–1, 3–0			Campclar Aquatic Center, Tarragona
29 June 2018; 18:40	Report	Gounas 5	Goals	Kahraman, Sönmez 1	Campclar Aquatic Center, Tarragona

7th place game

30 June 2018; 12:20	Report	Turkey	4–6	Portugal	Campclar Aquatic Center, Tarragona
30 June 2018; 12:20	Report	Score by quarters: 0–1, 2–1, 0–0, 2–4			Campclar Aquatic Center, Tarragona
30 June 2018; 12:20	Report	Bıyık 2	Goals	Moreira 3	Campclar Aquatic Center, Tarragona

=== Women's tournament ===
Turkey women's national water polo team ranked 6th.

Team
- Aylin Söylemez
- Damla Deniz Düz
- Doğa Rabia Cengiz
- Elif Dilara Aydınlık
- Karya Köse
- Kübra Kuş
- Melek Cavlak
- Yağmur Arzu Elma
- Zeynep Visha
Coach:

Preliminary round
Group B

Pos	Team	Pld	W	W+	L+	L	GF	GA	GD	Pts	Qualification
1	Italy	2	2	0	0	0	41	6	+35	6	Final
2	France	2	1	0	0	1	16	17	−1	3	3rd place game
3	Turkey	2	0	0	0	2	9	43	−34	0	5th place game

Source: Tarragona 2018

28 June 2018; 09:30	Report	Italy	30–3	Turkey	Campclar Aquatic Center, Tarragona
28 June 2018; 09:30	Report	Score by quarters: 6–1, 8–1, 8–0, 8–1			Campclar Aquatic Center, Tarragona
28 June 2018; 09:30	Report	five players 4	Goals	Kuş 3	Campclar Aquatic Center, Tarragona

29 June 2018; 11:40	Report	France	13–6	Turkey	Campclar Aquatic Center, Tarragona
29 June 2018; 11:40	Report	Score by quarters: 3–2, 6–0, 1–2, 3–2			Campclar Aquatic Center, Tarragona
29 June 2018; 11:40	Report	Paillat 4	Goals	Kuş 4	Campclar Aquatic Center, Tarragona

5th place game

30 June 2018; 09:30	Report	Portugal	16–8	Turkey	Campclar Aquatic Center, Tarragona
30 June 2018; 09:30	Report	Score by quarters: 4–3, 3–1, 4–2, 5–2			Campclar Aquatic Center, Tarragona
30 June 2018; 09:30	Report	Braga 4	Goals	Kuş 4	Campclar Aquatic Center, Tarragona

== Water skiing ==
=== Men ===
Athlete	Event	Score	Rank
Athlete	Event	Heat 1	
Osman Mehmet Tekinel	Slalom		

=== Women ===
Athlete	Event	Score	Rank
Athlete	Event	Heat 1	
Ayşe Şermin Kumbaracılar	Slalom		
Yasemin Burcu Demirok	Slalom		

== Weightlifting ==
=== Men ===
Athlete	Event	Snatch		Clean & Jerk	
Athlete	Event	Result	Rank	Result	Rank
Erol Bilgin	-62 kg	126 kg	2nd place, silver medalist(s)	156 kg	2nd place, silver medalist(s)
Ahmet Turan Okyay	-69 kg				
Danıyar İsmailov	-69 kg	152 kg	1st place, gold medalist(s)	179 kg	1st place, gold medalist(s)
Celil Erdoğdu	-77 kg	146 kg	3rd place, bronze medalist(s)	188 kg	3rd place, bronze medalist(s)
Resul Elvan	105 kg	160 kg	3rd place, bronze medalist(s)	203 kg	2nd place, silver medalist(s)

=== Women ===
Athlete	Event	Snatch		Clean & Jerk	
Athlete	Event	Result	Rank	Result	Rank
Şaziye Erdoğan	-48 kg	78 kg	1st place, gold medalist(s)	96 kg	1st place, gold medalist(s)
Ayşegül Çakın	-58 kg	86 kg	3rd place, bronze medalist(s)	114 kg	1st place, gold medalist(s)
Nuray Levent	-63 kg	95 kg	2nd place, silver medalist(s)	116 kg	1st place, gold medalist(s)
Duygu Aynacı	-69 kg				
Rabia Kaya	75 kg	98 kg	3rd place, bronze medalist(s)		

== Wrestling ==
=== Men ===
Freestyle

Athlete	Event	Round of 16	Quarterfinal	Semifinal	Repechage	Final / BM	Rank
Selahattin Kılıçsallayan	−65 kg	BYE	(Egypt) Ibrahim Aly; W 12–2	(Serbia) Stevan Andria Micic; W 8–4	—N/a	(Slovenia) Stevan Andria Micic; W	1st place, gold medalist(s)
Muhammet Demir	−74 kg	BYE	(Spain) Augisti Lopez Torresi; W 10–0	(Italy) Frank Chamizo Marquez; L 10–19	(North Macedonia) Dejan Mitrov; W	—N/a	3rd place, bronze medalist(s)
Ahmet Bilici	−86 kg	(North Macedonia) Besmir Veselovski; W 10–0	(Spain) Taimuraz Friev Naskidaeva; W 13–10	(Italy) Aron Canevaa; W 14–3	—N/a	(France) Akhmed Aibuev; W	1st place, gold medalist(s)
Yunus Emre Dede	−97 kg	(Greece) Timofei Xenidis; W 7–6	(Algeria) Mohammed Fardj; W 7–3	(North Macedonia) Magomedgadji Nurov; L 5–8	(Egypt) Hosam Merghany; W	—N/a	3rd place, bronze medalist(s)

Greco-Roman

Athlete	Event	Round of 16	Quarterfinal	Semifinal	Repechage 1	Final / BM	Rank
Elçin Ali	−60 kg	BYE	(France) Leo Tudezca; W 7–4	(Algeria) Abdennour Laouni; W 9–0	—N/a	(Egypt) Haitham Mahmoud; L 7–9	2nd place, silver medalist(s)
Murat Fırat	−67 kg	(Morocco) Ayoub Hanine; D 0–0	(Serbia) Kristian Fris; W 7–1	(France) Yasin Ozay; L 2–11	(Italy) Ignazio Sanfilippo; W 10–0	—N/a	3rd place, bronze medalist(s)
Yunus Emre Başar	−77 kg	BYE	(Morocco) Zied Ait Ouagram; D 0–0	(Croatia) Bozo Starcevic; W 6–1	—N/a	(Serbia) Davor Stefanek; W 5–0	1st place, gold medalist(s)
Metehan Başar	−87 kg	BYE	(Serbia) Vladimir Stankic; W 5–0	(Spain) Pedro Jacinto Garcia Perez; W 8–0	—N/a	(Algeria) Bashir Sidazara; W 2–1	1st place, gold medalist(s)
Süleyman Demirci	−97 kg	(Italy) El Mahdi Roccaro; W 8–0					

=== Women ===
Freestyle

Athlete	Event	Quarterfinal	Semifinal	Repechage	Final / BM	Rank
Evin Demirhan	−50 kg			—N/a	(France) Julie Sabatié; W	1st place, gold medalist(s)
Aysun Erge	−53 kg			—N/a	(Greece) Maria Prevolaraki; L	2nd place, silver medalist(s)
Bediha Gün	−57 kg			—N/a	(Italy) Carola Rainero; W	1st place, gold medalist(s)
Elif Jale Yeşilırmak	−62 kg			—N/a	(Tunisia) Marwa Amri; W	1st place, gold medalist(s)
Buse Tosun	−68 kg			—N/a	(Italy) Dalma Caneva; W	1st place, gold medalist(s)
