= 2015 World Taekwondo Championships – Women's lightweight =

Taekwondo competition

Women's lightweight at the 2015 World Championships
- Venue: Traktor Ice Arena
- Dates: 18 May 2015
- Competitors: 45 from 45 nations

Medalists
| gold medal | İrem Yaman | Turkey |
| silver medal | Marta Calvo | Spain |
| bronze medal | Viktoryia Belanouskaya | Belarus |
| bronze medal | Rachelle Booth | Great Britain |

The women's lightweight is a competition featured at the 2015 World Taekwondo Championships, and was held at the Traktor Ice Arena in Chelyabinsk, Russia on May 18. Lightweights were limited to a maximum of 62 kilograms in body mass.

== Results ==
Legend

- DQ — Won by disqualification

=== Finals ===
| Semifinals | | Final |
| Viktoryia Belanouskaya (BLR) | 0 |
| İrem Yaman (TUR) | 9 | İrem Yaman (TUR) | 14 |
| Marta Calvo (ESP) | 6 | Marta Calvo (ESP) | 4 |
| Rachelle Booth (GBR) | 4 |

=== Top half ===
==== Section 1 ====
Round of 64
~~Jade Zafra (PHI)~~
Roosa Närhi (FIN) | DQ
Farzana Frotan (AFG) | 1
Daria Shkurko (AZE) | 13
Hà Thị Nguyên (VIE) | 6
Viktoryia Belanouskaya (BLR) | 11

Round of 32
Nina Kläy (SUI) | 10
Roosa Närhi (FIN) | 2
Rewan Refaei (EGY) | DQ
~~Yudy Pérez (COL)~~
Rabia Gülec (GER) | 9
Daria Shkurko (AZE) | 1
Viktoryia Belanouskaya (BLR) | 11
Carmen Marton (AUS) | 5

Round of 16
Nina Kläy (SUI) | 1
Rewan Refaei (EGY) | 7
Rabia Gülec (GER) | 6
Viktoryia Belanouskaya (BLR) | 9

Quarterfinals
Rewan Refaei (EGY) | 7
Viktoryia Belanouskaya (BLR) | 8

==== Section 2 ====
Round of 64
Gerda Gaižauskaitė (LTU) | 5
Ioanna Sotiriou (CYP) | 4
Adanys Cordero (VEN) | 8
Lin Yi-ching (TPE) | 16
Tímea Braun (HUN) | 0
Shokraneh Izadi (IRI) | 14
Constanza Schober (CHI) | 8
Gulim Bibalayeva (KAZ) | 14

Round of 32
Zhang Hua (CHN) | 11
Gerda Gaižauskaitė (LTU) | 0
Lin Yi-ching (TPE) | 8
Anel Félix (MEX) | 2
İrem Yaman (TUR) | 3
Shokraneh Izadi (IRI) | 2
Gulim Bibalayeva (KAZ) | 11
Daria Adamiak (RUS) | 12

Round of 16
Zhang Hua (CHN) | 8
Lin Yi-ching (TPE) | 9
İrem Yaman (TUR) | 19
Daria Adamiak (RUS) | 7

Quarterfinals
Lin Yi-ching (TPE) | 2
İrem Yaman (TUR) | 3

=== Bottom half ===
==== Section 3 ====
Round of 64
~~Eslah Edrees (SUD)~~
Seo Ji-eun (KOR) | DQ
Dunja Lemajić (SLO) | 12
Iris Carvallo (ECU) | 0
Sofia Reis (CPV) | DQ
~~Rahaf Ismail (JOR)~~

Round of 32
Marina Sumić (CRO) | 6
Seo Ji-eun (KOR) | 5
Urgence Mouega (GAB) | 2
Joyce van Baaren (NED) | 3
Marta Calvo (ESP) | 7
Dunja Lemajić (SLO) | 5
Sofia Reis (CPV) | 3
Magda Wiet-Hénin (FRA) | 15

Round of 16
Marina Sumić (CRO) | 7
Joyce van Baaren (NED) | 1
Marta Calvo (ESP) | 6
Magda Wiet-Hénin (FRA) | 5

Quarterfinals
Marina Sumić (CRO) | 6
Marta Calvo (ESP) | 8

==== Section 4 ====
Round of 64
Adriana Šimánková (CZE) | 1
Daniela Rotolo (ITA) | 8
Kyra Potter (USA) | 7
Caroline Persson (SWE) | 4
Paschalia Mitou (GRE) | 8
Feng Xiao (MAC) | 11

Round of 32
Ruth Gbagbi (CIV) | 3
Daniela Rotolo (ITA) | 4
Kyra Potter (USA) | 3
Júlia Vasconcelos (BRA) | 8
Rachelle Booth (GBR) | 10
Darya Yakovleva (UKR) | 4
Feng Xiao (MAC) | 10
Ashley Kraayeveld (CAN) | 4

Round of 16
Daniela Rotolo (ITA) | 9
Júlia Vasconcelos (BRA) | 13
Rachelle Booth (GBR) | 11
Feng Xiao (MAC) | 3

Quarterfinals
Júlia Vasconcelos (BRA) | 5
Rachelle Booth (GBR) | 9
