= 2011 World Taekwondo Championships – Women's lightweight =

Taekwondo competition

Women's lightweight at the 2011 World Championships
- Venue: Gyeongju Indoor Stadium
- Dates: 3–4 May 2011
- Competitors: 53 from 53 nations

Medalists
gold medal	Rangsiya Nisaisom	Thailand
silver medal	Marina Sumić	Croatia
bronze medal	Karine Sergerie	Canada
bronze medal	Dürdane Altunel	Turkey

The Women's lightweight is a competition featured at the 2011 World Taekwondo Championships, and was held at the Gyeongju Gymnasium in Gyeongju, South Korea on May 3 and May 4. Lightweights were limited to a maximum of 62 kilograms in body mass.

== Results ==
Legend

- DQ — Won by disqualification
- W — Won by withdrawal

=== Finals ===
Semifinals		Final
Karine Sergerie (CAN)
Marina Sumić (CRO)	W	Marina Sumić (CRO)	1
Dürdane Altunel (TUR)	1	Rangsiya Nisaisom (THA)	3
Rangsiya Nisaisom (THA)	4

=== Top half ===
==== Section 1 ====
Round of 64
Veronica Tajes (ARG)	0
Michela Grandino (ITA)	12
Sanaz Shahbazi (USA)	DQ
~~Shahanaz Khatun (BAN)~~
Nguyễn Thị Đường (VIE)	DQ
~~Katherine Dumar (COL)~~
Sabina Mikayilova (AZE)	3
Urgence Mouegha (GAB)	5
Maria Camille Manalo (PHI)	3
Elzana Karahodžić (BIH)	1

Round of 32
Karine Sergerie (CAN)	4
Michela Grandino (ITA)	0
Sanaz Shahbazi (USA)	3
Nguyễn Thị Đường (VIE)	4
Joyce van Baaren (NED)	5
Urgence Mouegha (GAB)	0
Maria Camille Manalo (PHI)	DQ
~~Adanys Cordero (VEN)~~

Round of 16
Karine Sergerie (CAN)	8
Nguyễn Thị Đường (VIE)	8
Joyce van Baaren (NED)	1
Maria Camille Manalo (PHI)	0

Quarterfinals
Karine Sergerie (CAN)	4
Joyce van Baaren (NED)	3

==== Section 2 ====
Round of 64
~~Alimatou Diallo (SEN)~~
Marina Cheshuina (RUS)	DQ
Verina Wihongi (NZL)	DQ
~~Sarah Njuguna (KEN)~~
Marina Sumić (CRO)	5
Carolina Acosta (MEX)	2
Carmen Marton (AUS)	4
Darya Yakovleva (UKR)	2
Yojaira Díaz (DOM)	0
Eleni Karathanasi (GRE)	4
Ana Naiene (MOZ)	0
Elin Johansson (SWE)	12

Round of 32
Samera Megahed (EGY)	2
Marina Cheshuina (RUS)	12
Verina Wihongi (NZL)	0
Marina Sumić (CRO)	5
Carmen Marton (AUS)	7
Eleni Karathanasi (GRE)	1
Elin Johansson (SWE)	3
Haby Niaré (FRA)	3

Round of 16
Marina Cheshuina (RUS)	1
Marina Sumić (CRO)	12
Carmen Marton (AUS)	6
Elin Johansson (SWE)	3

Quarterfinals
Marina Sumić (CRO)	15
Carmen Marton (AUS)	3

=== Bottom half ===
==== Section 3 ====
Round of 64
Timothea Diola (CYP)	2
Rabia Gülec (GER)	11
Mária Gál (HUN)	12
Sneha Bhat (IND)	1
Liu Jing (CHN)	3
Kim Hwi-lang (KOR)	5
Dürdane Altunel (TUR)	4
Vony Dian Permatasari (INA)	0
Aparecida Santana (BRA)	DQ
~~Viktorija Spasovska (MKD)~~

Round of 32
Raheleh Asemani (IRI)	1
Rabia Gülec (GER)	0
Mária Gál (HUN)	0
Kim Hwi-lang (KOR)	12
~~Tahra Siad (SUD)~~
Dürdane Altunel (TUR)	DQ
Aparecida Santana (BRA)	1
Naima Bakkal (MAR)	3

Round of 16
Raheleh Asemani (IRI)	3
Kim Hwi-lang (KOR)	5
Dürdane Altunel (TUR)	6
Naima Bakkal (MAR)	0

Quarterfinals
Kim Hwi-lang (KOR)	6
Dürdane Altunel (TUR)	7

==== Section 4 ====
Round of 64
Rangsiya Nisaisom (THA)	DQ
~~Gradi Kamuanya (COD)~~
Nina Kläy (SUI)	DQ
~~Marie Ngo Ebem (CMR)~~
Ingibjörg Grétarsdóttir (ISL)	2
Aurora Román (PUR)	6
Mariama Dalanda Barry (GUI)	2
Lin Jo-wei (TPE)	5
Zhadyra Kospagarova (KAZ)	8
Ng Ka Man (HKG)	3

Round of 32
Shaden Thweib (JOR)	4
Rangsiya Nisaisom (THA)	6
Nina Kläy (SUI)	16
Coralia Abadía (GUA)	1
Aurora Román (PUR)	2
Lin Jo-wei (TPE)	6
Zhadyra Kospagarova (KAZ)	4
Estefanía Hernández (ESP)	5

Round of 16
Rangsiya Nisaisom (THA)	6
Nina Kläy (SUI)	1
Lin Jo-wei (TPE)	9
Estefanía Hernández (ESP)	3

Quarterfinals
Rangsiya Nisaisom (THA)	4
Lin Jo-wei (TPE)	1
