= Beach volleyball at the 2018 Mediterranean Games =

- Venue: Arrabassada Beach Stadium
- Dates: 28–30 June
- Competitors: 70 from 15 nations

The beach volleyball tournament at the 2018 Mediterranean Games in Tarragona took place between 28 and 30 June at the Arrabassada Beach Stadium.

== Medal table ==
* Host nation (Spain)

| Rank | Nation | Gold | Silver | Bronze | Total |
|---|---|---|---|---|---|
| 1 | Spain* | 1 | 0 | 1 | 2 |
| 1 | Turkey | 1 | 0 | 1 | 2 |
| 3 | France | 0 | 1 | 0 | 1 |
| 3 | Italy | 0 | 1 | 0 | 1 |
| Totals (4 entries) | | 2 | 2 | 2 | 6 |

== Medalists ==
| Event | Gold | Silver | Bronze |
|---|---|---|---|
| Men | Turkey; Murat Giginoğlu; Volkan Göğtepe | Italy; Marco Caminati; Enrico Rossi | Turkey; Hasan Hüseyin Mermer; Sefa Urlu |
| Women | Spain; María Carro; Paula Soria | France; Aline Chamereau; Alexandra Jupiter | Spain; Amaranta Fernández; Ángela Lobato |
