= Archery at the 2018 Mediterranean Games =

- Venue: Campclar Athletics Stadium
- Dates: 22–24 June
- Competitors: 63 from 17 nations

The archery competitions at the 2018 Mediterranean Games in Tarragona took place between 22 and 24 June at the Campclar Athletics Stadium.

Athletes competed in four recurve archery events.

== Medal summary ==
=== Medalists ===
Event	Gold	Silver	Bronze
Men's individual	Mete Gazoz; Turkey	Gašper Štrajhar; Slovenia	Pablo Acha; Spain
Men's team	Romain Fichet; Mathieu Jimenez; Thomas Koenig; France	Rok Bizjak; Den Habjan Malavašič; Gašper Štrajhar; Slovenia	Pablo Acha; Miguel Alvariño; Antonio Fernández; Spain
Women's individual	Lucilla Boari; Italy	Mónica Galisteo; Spain	Aybüke Aktuna; Turkey
Women's team	Marion Bardary; Angéline Cohendet; Bérangère Rogazy; France	Mónica Galisteo; Nerea López; Alicia Marín; Spain	Aybüke Aktuna; Yasemin Anagöz; Gülnaz Büşranur Coşkun; Turkey

=== Medal table ===
Rank	Nation	Gold	Silver	Bronze	Total
1	France (FRA)	2	0	0	2
2	Turkey (TUR)	1	0	2	3
3	Italy (ITA)	1	0	0	1
4	Spain (ESP)*	0	2	2	4
5	Slovenia (SLO)	0	2	0	2
Totals (5 entries)		4	4	4	12
