= Table tennis at the 2018 Mediterranean Games =

- Venue: Valls Joana Ballart Pavilion
- Dates: 26–30 June

The table tennis competitions at the 2018 Mediterranean Games took place between 26 and 30 June at the Valls Joana Ballart Pavilion in Valls.

Athletes competed in two individual and two team events.

== Medal summary ==
=== Medalists ===
Event	Gold	Silver	Bronze
Men's singles	Darko Jorgić; Slovenia	Jesús Cantero; Spain	İbrahim Gündüz; Turkey
Men's team	Slovenia (SLO); Darko Jorgić; Deni Kožul; Bojan Tokič	France (FRA); Léo De Nodrest; Alexandre Robinot; Joé Seyfried	Portugal (POR); André Silva; Diogo Carvalho; Diogo Chen
Women's singles	Dina Meshref; Egypt	Yang Xiaoxin; Monaco	Galia Dvorak; Spain
Women's team	Spain (ESP); Galia Dvorak; María Xiao; Sofía Xuan Zhang	Turkey (TUR); Sibel Altınkaya; Gülpembe Özkaya; Özge Yılmaz	France (FRA); Laura Gasnier; Stéphanie Loeuillette; Audrey Zarif

=== Medal table ===
Rank	Nation	Gold	Silver	Bronze	Total
1	Slovenia	2	0	0	2
2	Spain*	1	1	1	3
3	Egypt	1	0	0	1
4	France	0	1	1	2
4	Turkey	0	1	1	2
6	Monaco	0	1	0	1
7	Portugal	0	0	1	1
Totals (7 entries)		4	4	4	12
