= Rachelle Booth =

English taekwondo practitioner

Personal information
- Nationality: British
- Born: 31 August 1995 (age 30) Wigan

Sport
- Country: United Kingdom
- Sport: Taekwondo
- Event(s): -57 kg, -62 kg, -67 kg
Medal record
Representing United Kingdom
Women's taekwondo
World Championships
Bronze medal – third place	2015 Chelyabinsk	Lightweight

Rachelle Booth (born 31 August 1995) is an English taekwondo athlete.

In May 2015, Booth competed in the -62kg category in the 2015 World Taekwondo Championships. She made the semi-finals, winning a bronze medal after losing to Mexican, Marta Calvo Gomez. The games were her debut World Championships and came only 18 months after joining the GB taekwondo team.
