= Swimming at the 2018 Mediterranean Games – Women's 50 metre breaststroke =

Women's 50 metre breaststroke at the 2018 Mediterranean Games
- Venue: Campclar Aquatic Center
- Location: Tarragona, Spain
- Dates: 25 June
- Competitors: 13 from 9 nations
- Winning time: 31.07

Medalists
gold medal	Arianna Castiglioni	Italy
silver medal	Martina Carraro	Italy
bronze medal	Jessica Vall	Spain

The women's 50 metre breaststroke competition at the 2018 Mediterranean Games was held on 25 June 2018 at the Campclar Aquatic Center.

== Records ==
Prior to this competition, the existing world and Mediterranean Games records were as follows:

World record	Lilly King (USA)	29.40	Budapest, Hungary	30 July 2017
Mediterranean Games record	Anastasia Christoforou (CYP)	31.12	Pescara, Italy	1 July 2009

The following records were established during the competition:

Date	Event	Name	Nationality	Time	Record
25 June	Final	Arianna Castiglioni	Italy	31.07	GR

== Results ==
=== Heats ===
The heats were held at 09:39.

Rank	Heat	Lane	Name	Nationality	Time	Notes
1	2	4	Arianna Castiglioni	Italy	31.13	Q
2	1	4	Martina Carraro	Italy	31.58	Q
3	2	2	Maria Drasidou	Greece	31.86	Q
4	2	5	Jessica Vall	Spain	31.88	Q
5	2	3	Gülşen Beste Samancı	Turkey	31.92	Q
6	1	6	Marina García Urzainqui	Spain	32.02	Q
7	2	7	Solène Gallego	France	32.13	Q
8	1	3	Tina Čelik	Slovenia	32.21	Q
9	2	7	Viktoriya Zeynep Güneş	Turkey	32.42	
10	1	5	Tjaša Vozel	Slovenia	33.01	
11	1	2	Emina Pašukan	Bosnia and Herzegovina	33.10	
12	1	7	Raquel Gomes Pereira	Portugal	33.36	
13	2	1	Rania Nefsi	Algeria	34.87	

=== Final ===
The final was held at 17:39.

Rank	Lane	Name	Nationality	Time	Notes
1st place, gold medalist(s)	4	Arianna Castiglioni	Italy	31.07	GR
2nd place, silver medalist(s)	5	Martina Carraro	Italy	31.33	
3rd place, bronze medalist(s)	6	Jessica Vall	Spain	31.49	
4	7	Marina García Urzainqui	Spain	31.69	
4	3	Maria Drasidou	Greece	31.69	
6	2	Gülşen Beste Samancı	Turkey	31.73	
7	8	Tina Čelik	Slovenia	31.95	
8	1	Solène Gallego	France	32.20	
