= Swimming at the 2018 Mediterranean Games – Women's 100 metre breaststroke =

Women's 100 metre breaststroke at the 2018 Mediterranean Games
- Venue: Campclar Aquatic Center
- Location: Tarragona, Spain
- Dates: 24 June
- Competitors: 12 from 8 nations
- Winning time: 1:07.19

Medalists
gold medal	Jessica Vall	Spain
silver medal	Marina García Urzainqui	Spain
bronze medal	Arianna Castiglioni	Italy

The women's 100 metre breaststroke competition at the 2018 Mediterranean Games was held on 24 June 2018 at the Campclar Aquatic Center.

== Records ==
Prior to this competition, the existing world and Mediterranean Games records were as follows:

World record	Lilly King (USA)	1:04.13	Budapest, Hungary	25 July 2017
Mediterranean Games record	Roberta Panara (ITA)	1:08.47	Pescara, Italy	27 June 2009

The following records were established during the competition:

Date	Event	Name	Nationality	Time	Record
24 June	Heats	Marina García Urzainqui	Spain	1:07.83	GR
24 June	Final	Jessica Vall	Spain	1:07.19	GR

== Results ==
=== Heats ===
The heats were held at 10:24.

Rank	Heat	Lane	Name	Nationality	Time	Notes
1	2	3	Marina García Urzainqui	Spain	1:07.83	Q, GR
2	2	4	Jessica Vall	Spain	1:07.90	Q
3	2	5	Martina Carraro	Italy	1:08.12	Q
4	1	4	Arianna Castiglioni	Italy	1:08.45	Q
5	1	5	Tjaša Vozel	Slovenia	1:09.73	Q
6	1	2	Gülşen Beste Samancı	Turkey	1:09.92	Q
7	1	3	Tina Čelik	Slovenia	1:10.06	Q
8	2	6	Viktoriya Zeynep Güneş	Turkey	1:10.76	Q
9	1	6	Solène Gallego	France	1:11.07	
10	2	2	Raquel Gomes Pereira	Portugal	1:11.10	
11	1	7	Maria Drasidou	Greece	1:11.93	
12	2	7	Emina Pašukan	Bosnia and Herzegovina	1:12.33	

=== Final ===
The final was held at 18:03.

Rank	Lane	Name	Nationality	Time	Notes
1st place, gold medalist(s)	5	Jessica Vall	Spain	1:07.19	GR
2nd place, silver medalist(s)	4	Marina García Urzainqui	Spain	1:07.58	
3rd place, bronze medalist(s)	6	Arianna Castiglioni	Italy	1:07.85	
4	3	Martina Carraro	Italy	1:08.20	
5	8	Viktoriya Zeynep Güneş	Turkey	1:09.68	
6	2	Tjaša Vozel	Slovenia	1:09.72	
7	1	Tina Čelik	Slovenia	1:10.41	
8	7	Gülşen Beste Samancı	Turkey	1:10.92	
