= Júlia Vasconcelos =

Brazilian taekwondo practitioner

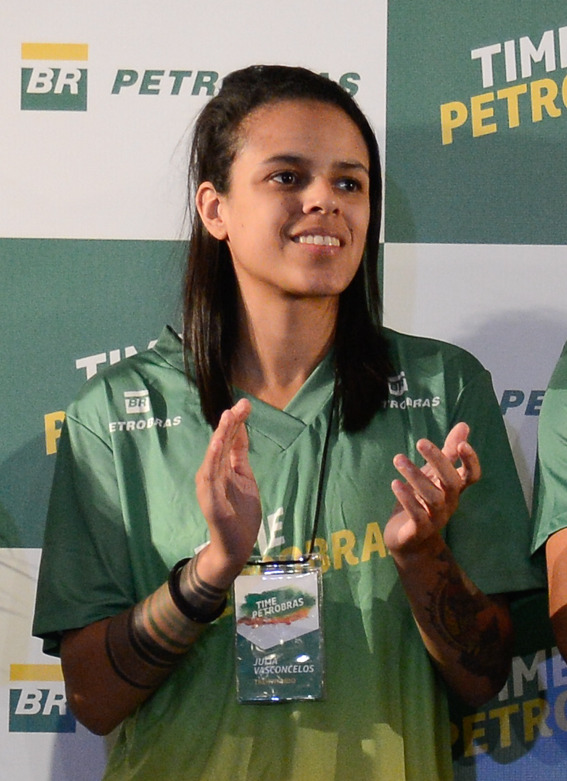
- Júlia Vasconcelos in 2016

Personal information
- Born: 15 June 1992 (age 34) São José dos Campos, Brazil
- Height: 173 cm (5 ft 8 in)
- Weight: 57 kg (126 lb)

Sport
- Sport: Taekwondo
- Club: Liga Vale
- Coached by: Daniel Melo

Júlia Vasconcelos (born 15 June 1992) is a taekwondo competitor from Brazil. She participated in the 2013 and 2015 world championships and qualified for the 2016 Summer Olympics in the 57 kg division.
