= Volleyball at the 2018 Mediterranean Games – Men's tournament =

Men's Volleyball at the 2018 Mediterranean Games
- Venue: Tarraco Arena Plaza; Pabellón Municipal del Serrallo
- Location: (Spain) Tarragona
- Dates: 22 June – 1 July
- Nations: 12

Medalists
gold medal	Italy (7th title)
silver medal	Spain
bronze medal	Greece

The men's volleyball tournament at the 2018 Mediterranean Games was held from 22 June to 1 July at the Tarraco Arena Plaza and the Pabellón Municipal del Serrallo in Tarragona.

== Participating teams ==
- Albania
- Algeria
- Croatia
- Egypt
- Greece
- France
- Italy
- Macedonia
- Portugal
- Spain (host)
- Tunisia
- Turkey

== Preliminary round ==
All times are local (UTC+2).

=== Group A ===
Pos	Team	Pld	W	L	Pts	SW	SL	SR	SPW	SPL	SPR	Qualification
1	Italy	2	2	0	6	6	0	MAX	150	109	1.376	Quarterfinals
2	Greece	2	1	1	3	3	3	1.000	137	133	1.030	Quarterfinals
3	Portugal	2	0	2	0	0	6	0.000	105	150	0.700	

Date	Time		Score		Set 1	Set 2	Set 3	Set 4	Set 5	Total	Report
23 Jun	13:00	Italy	3–0	Greece	25–20	25–19	25–23			75–62	P1 P2
24 Jun	16:00	Greece	3–0	Portugal	25–20	25–18	25–20			75–58	P2
25 Jun	16:00	Portugal	0–3	Italy	21–25	18–25	8–25			47–75	P2

=== Group B ===
Pos	Team	Pld	W	L	Pts	SW	SL	SR	SPW	SPL	SPR	Qualification
1	France	2	2	0	6	6	1	6.000	179	152	1.178	Quarterfinals
2	Croatia	2	1	1	2	3	5	0.600	171	173	0.988	Quarterfinals
3	Algeria	2	0	2	1	3	6	0.500	189	214	0.883	

Date	Time		Score		Set 1	Set 2	Set 3	Set 4	Set 5	Total	Report
23 Jun	10:00	France	3–0	Croatia	25–19	25–22	25–20			75–61	P2
24 Jun	11:00	Croatia	3–2	Algeria	25–19	25–17	22–25	23–25	15–12	110–98	P2
25 Jun	11:00	Algeria	1–3	France	31–29	16–25	21–25	23–25		91–104	P2

=== Group C ===
Pos	Team	Pld	W	L	Pts	SW	SL	SR	SPW	SPL	SPR	Qualification
1	Spain	2	2	0	6	6	1	6.000	170	136	1.250	Quarterfinals
2	Egypt	2	1	1	2	4	5	0.800	197	204	0.966	Quarterfinals
3	Macedonia	2	0	2	1	2	6	0.333	161	188	0.856	

Date	Time		Score		Set 1	Set 2	Set 3	Set 4	Set 5	Total	Report
22 Jun	13:30	Egypt	3–2	Macedonia	26–24	24–26	25–23	23–25	15–11	113–109	P2
23 Jun	19:00	Macedonia	0–3	Spain	16–25	14–25	22–25			52–75	P2
25 Jun	19:00	Spain	3–1	Egypt	19–25	25–17	26–24	25–18		95–84	P2

=== Group D ===
Pos	Team	Pld	W	L	Pts	SW	SL	SR	SPW	SPL	SPR	Qualification
1	Turkey	2	2	0	5	6	2	3.000	189	147	1.286	Quarterfinals
2	Tunisia	2	1	1	4	5	3	1.667	179	169	1.059	Quarterfinals
3	Albania	2	0	2	0	0	6	0.000	98	150	0.653	

Date	Time		Score		Set 1	Set 2	Set 3	Set 4	Set 5	Total	Report
22 Jun	10:30	Tunisia	3–0	Albania	25–17	25–19	25–19			75–55	P2
23 Jun	16:00	Albania	0–3	Turkey	22–25	4–25	17–25			43–75	P2
24 Jun	19:00	Turkey	3–2	Tunisia	25–19	21–25	25–18	28–30	15–12	114–104	P2

== Final round ==
=== Classification bracket ===
Classification 5–8
29 June
Croatia	3
Turkey	2
29 June
France	1
Tunisia	3

Fifth place
30 June
Croatia	3
Tunisia	1
Seventh place
30 June
Turkey	3
France	2

==== Classification 5–8 ====
Date	Time		Score		Set 1	Set 2	Set 3	Set 4	Set 5	Total	Report
29 Jun	10:00	Croatia	3–2	Turkey	23–25	25–20	23–25	25–21	15–10	111–101	P2
29 Jun	13:00	France	1–3	Tunisia	21–25	20–25	25–23	23–25		89–98	P2

==== Seventh place game ====
Date	Time		Score		Set 1	Set 2	Set 3	Set 4	Set 5	Total	Report
30 Jun	13:00	Turkey	3–2	France	19–25	25–20	26–28	25–18	15–10	110–101	P2

==== Fifth place game ====
Date	Time		Score		Set 1	Set 2	Set 3	Set 4	Set 5	Total	Report
30 Jun	13:00	Croatia	3–1	Tunisia	28–26	21–25	25–22	25–23		99–96	P2

=== Championship bracket ===
Quarter-finals
27 June
Italy	3
Croatia	0
27 June
Turkey	0
Egypt	3
27 June
France	0
Greece	3
27 June
Spain	3
Tunisia	0

Semi-finals
29 June
Italy	3
Egypt	0
29 June
Greece	0
Spain	3

Final
1 July
Italy	3
Spain	1
Third place
30 June
Egypt	2
Greece	3

==== Quarterfinals ====
Date	Time		Score		Set 1	Set 2	Set 3	Set 4	Set 5	Total	Report
27 Jun	10:00	Italy	3–0	Croatia	25–18	25–18	25–23			75–59	P2
27 Jun	13:00	France	0–3	Greece	24–26	18–25	15–25			57–76	P2
27 Jun	16:00	Turkey	0–3	Egypt	21–25	25–27	19–25			65–77	P2
27 Jun	19:00	Spain	3–0	Tunisia	25–22	25–23	25–18			75–63	P2

==== Semifinals ====
Date	Time		Score		Set 1	Set 2	Set 3	Set 4	Set 5	Total	Report
29 Jun	10:00	Italy	3–0	Egypt	25–14	25–20	25–19			75–53	P2
29 Jun	13:00	Greece	0–3	Spain	23–25	15–25	16–25			54–75	P2

==== Third place game ====
Date	Time		Score		Set 1	Set 2	Set 3	Set 4	Set 5	Total	Report
30 Jun	19:00	Egypt	2–3	Greece	23–25	22–25	25–19	25–17	10–15	105–101	P2

==== Final ====
Date	Time		Score		Set 1	Set 2	Set 3	Set 4	Set 5	Total	Report
1 Jul	12:30	Italy	3–1	Spain	25–22	25–17	33–35	25–23		108–97	P2

== Final standings ==
Rank	Team
1st place, gold medalist(s)	Italy
2nd place, silver medalist(s)	Spain
3rd place, bronze medalist(s)	Greece
4	Egypt
5	Croatia
6	Tunisia
7	Turkey
8	France
9	Albania
9	Algeria
9	Macedonia
9	Portugal
