= Boules at the 2018 Mediterranean Games =

Bowls at the 2018 Mediterranean Games
- Venue: Campclar Velodrome
- Dates: 28–30 June

The boules competitions at the 2018 Mediterranean Games in Tarragona, in Catalonia (Spain), took place between 28 and 30 June at the Campclar Velodrome.

Athletes competed in 9 events across 3 disciplines: lyonnaise, pétanque and raffa.

== Medal summary ==
=== Lyonnaise ===
Event	Gold	Silver	Bronze
Men's precision throw	Pero Ćubela; Croatia	Jure Kozjek; Slovenia	Simone Mana; Italy
Men's progressive throw	Aleš Borčnik; Slovenia	Stefano Pegoraro; Italy	Frédéric Marsens; France
Women's precision throw	Nives Jelovica; Croatia	Sésilia Mailehako; France	Caterina Venturini; Italy
Women's progressive throw	İnci Ece Öztür; Turkey	Barbara Barthet; France	Serena Traversa; Italy

=== Pétanque ===
Event	Gold	Silver	Bronze
Men's precision throw	Diego Rizzi; Italy	Bruno Le Boursicaud; France	Abdessamad El Mankari; Morocco
Men's doubles	France; Damien Hureau; Bruno Le Boursicaud	Italy; Alessio Cocciolo; Diego Rizzi	Tunisia; Mohamed Khaled Bougriba; Majdi Hammami
Women's precision throw	Mouna Béji; Tunisia	Gülçin Çelik; Turkey	Asma Belli; Tunisia
Women's doubles	Tunisia; Mouna Béji; Asma Belli	France; Angélique Colombet; Ludivine D'Isidoro	Spain; María José Muñoz; María José Pérez

=== Raffa ===
Event	Gold	Silver	Bronze
Men's individual	Enrico Dall'Olmo; San Marino	Alfonso Nanni; Italy	Stefan Farrugia; Malta

== Medal table ==
Rank	Nation	Gold	Silver	Bronze	Total
1	Tunisia (TUN)	2	0	2	4
2	Croatia (CRO)	2	0	0	2
3	France (FRA)	1	4	1	6
4	Italy (ITA)	1	3	3	7
5	Slovenia (SLO)	1	1	0	2
5	Turkey (TUR)	1	1	0	2
7	San Marino (SMR)	1	0	0	1
8	Malta (MLT)	0	0	1	1
8	Morocco (MAR)	0	0	1	1
8	Spain (ESP)*	0	0	1	1
Totals (10 entries)		9	9	9	27
