= Swimming at the 2018 Mediterranean Games – Men's 200 metre breaststroke =

Men's 200 metre breaststroke at the 2018 Mediterranean Games
- Venue: Campclar Aquatic Center
- Location: Tarragona, Spain
- Dates: 23 June
- Competitors: 12 from 9 nations
- Winning time: 2:09.91

Medalists
gold medal	Luca Pizzini	Italy
silver medal	Joan Ballester	Spain
bronze medal	Alex Castejón	Spain

The men's 200 metre breaststroke competition at the 2018 Mediterranean Games was held on 23 June 2018 at the Campclar Aquatic Center.

== Records ==
Prior to this competition, the existing world and Mediterranean Games records were as follows:

World record	Ippei Watanabe (JPN)	2:06.67	Tokyo, Japan	29 January 2017
Mediterranean Games record	Melquíades Álvarez (ESP)	2:09.69	Pescara, Italy	29 June 2009

== Results ==
=== Heats ===
The heats were held at 10:12.

Rank	Heat	Lane	Name	Nationality	Time	Notes
1	1	4	Luca Pizzini	Italy	2:12.75	Q
2	2	3	Alex Castejón	Spain	2:13.96	Q
3	1	5	Joan Ballester	Spain	2:15.06	Q
4	1	2	Wassim Elloumi	Tunisia	2:15.81	Q
5	2	4	Edoardo Giorgetti	Italy	2:15.99	Q
6	2	6	Aljaž Kerč	Slovenia	2:16.52	Q
7	1	3	Youssef Elkamash	Egypt	2:16.69	Q
8	1	7	Ioannis Karpouzlis	Greece	2:17.24	Q
9	2	2	Berkay Öğretir	Turkey	2:17.92	
10	2	5	Romanos Alyfantis	Greece	2:18.22	
11	2	7	Moncef Balamane	Algeria	2:23.24	
	1	6	Tomás Veloso	Portugal	DSQ	

=== Final ===
The heats was held at 18:23.

Rank	Lane	Name	Nationality	Time	Notes
1st place, gold medalist(s)	4	Luca Pizzini	Italy	2:09.91	
2nd place, silver medalist(s)	3	Joan Ballester	Spain	2:13.48	
3rd place, bronze medalist(s)	5	Alex Castejón	Spain	2:13.91	
4	2	Edoardo Giorgetti	Italy	2:13.93	
5	6	Wassim Elloumi	Tunisia	2:14.88	
6	7	Aljaž Kerč	Slovenia	2:16.36	
7	1	Youssef Elkamash	Egypt	2:17.57	
8	8	Ioannis Karpouzlis	Greece	2:17.72	
