= Judo at the 2018 Mediterranean Games – Women's +78 kg =

Judo competitions

Women's +78 kg at the 2018 Mediterranean Games
- Venue: Cambrils Pavilion
- Date: 29 June
- Competitors: 8 from 8 nations

Medalists
gold medal	Kayra Sayit	Turkey
silver medal	Nihel Cheikh Rouhou	Tunisia
bronze medal	Sonia Asselah	Algeria
bronze medal	Julia Tolofua	France

The women's +78 kg competition in judo at the 2018 Mediterranean Games was held on 29 June at the Cambrils Pavilion in Cambrils.

== Schedule ==
All times are Central European Summer Time (UTC+2).

Date	Time	Round
June 29, 2018	10:24	Quarterfinals
June 29, 2018	11:28	Semifinals
June 29, 2018	13:04	Repechage
June 29, 2018	17:32	Bronze medal
June 29, 2018	17:40	Final

== Results ==
=== Main Round ===
Quarterfinals
Nihel Cheikh Rouhou (TUN)	10
Yahima Ramirez (POR)	00
Sonia Asselah (ALG)	00
Julia Tolofua (FRA)	10
Kayra Sayit (TUR)	10
Annalisa Calagreti (ITA)	10
Ivana Šutalo (CRO)	01
Sara Álvarez (ESP)	11

Semifinals
Nihel Cheikh Rouhou (TUN)	11
Julia Tolofua (FRA)	00
Kayra Sayit (TUR)	10
Sara Álvarez (ESP)	00

Finals
Nihel Cheikh Rouhou (TUN)	00
Kayra Sayit (TUR)	11

=== Repechage ===
Repechage 2		Bronze medal
Yahima Ramirez (POR)	00
Sonia Asselah (ALG)	10	Sonia Asselah (ALG)	10
		Sara Álvarez (ESP)	00

Repechage 2		Bronze medal
Annalisa Calagreti (ITA)	00
Ivana Šutalo (CRO)	01	Ivana Šutalo (CRO)	00
		Julia Tolofua (FRA)	01
