= Sibel Altınkaya =

Turkish table tennis player (born 1993)

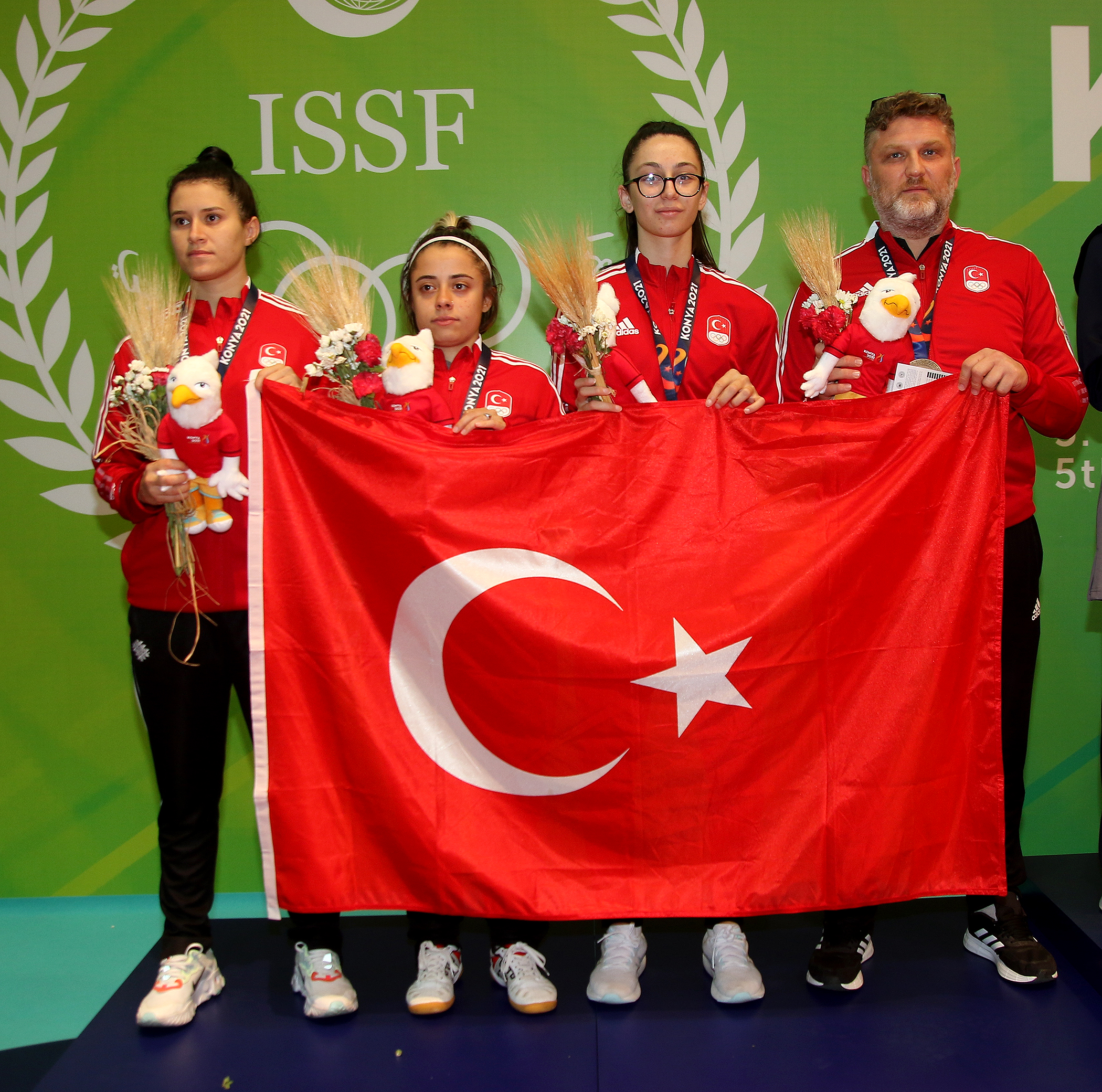

Personal information
- Born: 1 February 1993 (age 33) Ruse, Bulgaria

Sport
- Sport: Table tennis
- Club: Fenerbahçe Table Tennis
- Playing style: Right-handed, shakehand attacking
- Highest ranking: 70 (February 2026)
Medal record
Women's table tennis
Representing Turkey
Mediterranean Games
Silver medal – second place	2018 Tarragona	Team
Islamic Solidarity Games
Gold medal – first place	2025 Riyadh	Mixed doubles
Silver medal – second place	2021 Konya	Team
Silver medal – second place	2025 Riyadh	Team
Bronze medal – third place	2021 Konya	Singles
Bronze medal – third place	2025 Riyadh	Singles

Sibel Altınkaya (born 1 February 1993) is a Turkish table tennis player. She qualified to participate at the 2024 Olympics in Paris, France.

== Sport career ==
Altınkaya is Turkish National table tennis player.She started her table tennis career in 2000. She won many domestic championships. In 2008, she debuted internationally. She has Balkan Championships and seven consecutive European Championships titles. She is coached by Ufuk Altınkaya.

As of 25 June 2024, she ranks 91st in the world list. 2023 Her highest rank was 71st in April .February 2026 her best ranking is 70.8th times single senior Turkish Champion.2017 first time she transferred to German Bundesliga team SV DJK Kolbermoor.2021 she transferred to Pro A France-CP Lys Lille Metropole.2022-2024 transferred to Bayard Argentan.End of June 2024, she transferred again to Fenerbahçe Table Tennis. She is right-handed, and attacks shakehand.

She took the silver medal in the team event at the 2018 Mediterranean Games in Tarragona, Spain.

She competed in the team event of the European Championships in 2019 in Nantes, France and 2021 in Cluj-Napoca, Romania.

She and her teammates failed to advance to the second round in the doubles event and to the third round in the mixed doubles event at the 2021 World Championships in Houston, United States.

She participated at the 2022 WTT Singapore Grand Smash, where she was not able to qualify for the main tour.

At the 2022 Mediterranean Games in Oran, Algeria, she ranked fifth in the singles and seventh in the team event. She so improved her rank in the world list to 89th.

She won the bronze medal in the singles event, and the silver medal in the team event at the 2021 Islamic Solidarity Games in Konya, Turkey.

In the doubles and mixed doubles events at the 2023 World Championships in Durban, KwaZulu-Natal, South Africa, she and her teammates lost the first round.

She lost the first round in the singles event at the 2023 European Games in Kraków, Poland.

After gathering points at the 2024 WTT Star Contender Ljubljana, Altınkaya qualified to represent her country at the 2024 Olympics in Paris, France after her achievement at the WTT Star Contender Ljubljana 2024. She lost the Round of 64 match against Chinese Ni Xialian from Luxembourg by 2–4, and was eliminated.

== Personal life ==
Sibel Altınkaya was born in Ruse Bulgaria], on 1 February 1993. Bachelor's degree-National Sports Academy ‘’Vasil Levski’’

She married Ufuk Altınkaya, a table tennis coach whom she met at the Turkish Championships in Marmaris in 2014.[3]
