= Dürdane Altunel =

Turkish taekwondo practitioner

Personal information
- Nationality: Turkish
- Born: 1995 (age 30–31) Konya, Turkey

Sport
- Country: Turkey
- Sport: Taekwondo
- Event: Lightweight
Medal record
World Championships
Bronze medal – third place	2011 Gyeongju	Lightweight
Islamic Solidarity Games
Gold medal – first place	2013 Palembang	-62 kg

Dürdane Altunel (born 1995 in Konya) is a Turkish taekwondo practitioner competing in the lightweight division.

== Career ==
She began taekwondo in 2007 at the age of 12 in Selçuklu, Konya by invitation of her brother's taekwondo trainer.

Dürdane Altunel won a bronze medal at the 2011 World Taekwondo Championships held in Gyeongju, South Korea. At the 2013 Islamic Solidarity Games held in Palembang, Indonesia, she won the gold medal in the -62 kg division.

== See also ==
- Turkish women in sports
