= Nina Kläy =

Swiss taekwondo practitioner (born 1989)

Personal information
- Nationality: Swiss
- Born: 19 June 1989 (age 37)

Sport
- Sport: Taekwondo

Achievements and titles
- World finals: 5 (2007, 2009, 2011, 2013, 2015)
Medal record
Representing Switzerland
Women's taekwondo
World Championships
Bronze medal – third place	2013 Puebla	Lightweight
European Championships
Gold medal – first place	2014 Baku	-62 kg
Silver medal – second place	2006 Bonn	-59 kg

Nina Kläy (born 19 June 1989) is a Swiss taekwondo practitioner.

She won a bronze medal in lightweight at the 2013 World Taekwondo Championships, after being defeated by Kim Hwi-lang in the semifinal. She participated at the World Taekwondo Championships five times (2007, 2009, 2011, 2013, 2015). Her achievements at the European Taekwondo Championships include a gold medal in 2014, and a bronze medal in 2006.
