= Marina Sumić =

Croatian taekwondo practitioner

Personal information
- Nationality: Croatian
- Born: 18 August 1991 (age 34)

Sport
- Sport: Taekwondo
Medal record
Representing Croatia
Women's taekwondo
World Championships
Silver medal – second place	2011 Gyeongju	Lightweight
European Championships
Silver medal – second place	2012 Manchester	-62 kg
Silver medal – second place	2014 Baku	-62 kg

Marina Sumić (born 18 August 1991) is a Croatian taekwondo practitioner.

She won a silver medal in lightweight at the 2011 World Taekwondo Championships, after being defeated by Rangsiya Nisaisom in the final. Her achievements at the European Taekwondo Championships include silver medals in 2012 and 2014.
