= Volleyball at the 2018 Mediterranean Games =

- Venue: Tarraco Arena Plaza; Pabellón Municipal del Serrallo
- Dates: 22 June – 1 July
- Nations: 15
- Teams: 12 (men); 12 (women)

Champions
- Men: Italy
- Women: Croatia

The volleyball tournaments at the 2018 Mediterranean Games in Tarragona took place between 22 June and 1 July 2018.

== Medal summary ==
=== Events ===
Event	Gold	Silver	Bronze
Men	Italy (ITA)	Spain (ESP)	Greece (GRE)
Women	Croatia (CRO)	Greece (GRE)	Turkey (TUR)

=== Medal table ===
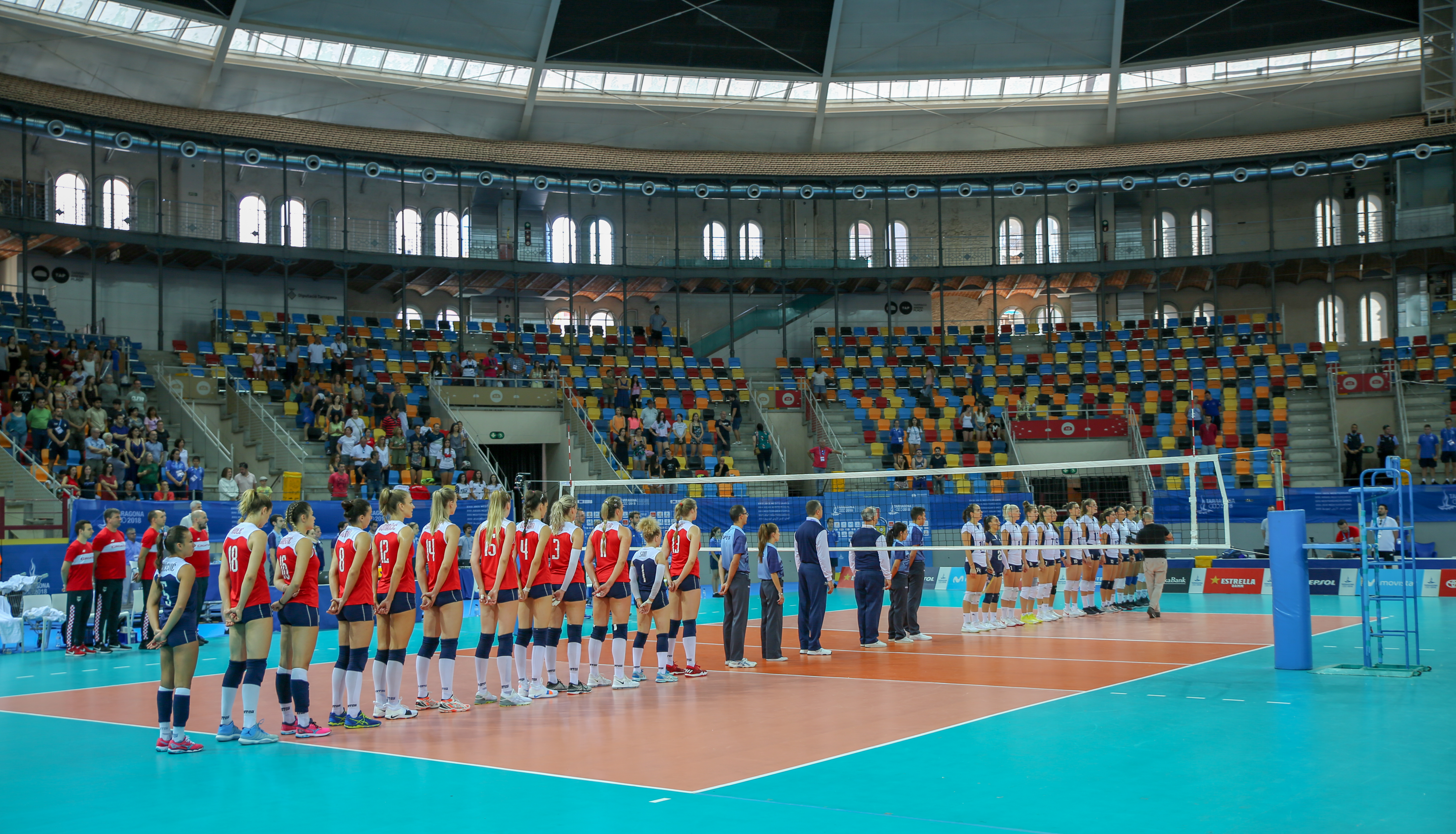
Volleyball Women´s Final at the 2018 Mediterranean Games

Rank	Nation	Gold	Silver	Bronze	Total
1	Croatia (CRO)	1	0	0	1
1	Italy (ITA)	1	0	0	1
3	Greece (GRE)	0	1	1	2
4	Spain (ESP)*	0	1	0	1
5	Turkey (TUR)	0	0	1	1
Totals (5 entries)		2	2	2	6

== Participating nations ==
Men

Federation	Nation
CAVB Africa	Algeria; Egypt; Tunisia
CEV Europe	Albania; Croatia; Greece; France; Italy; Macedonia; Portugal; Spain; Turkey

Women

Federation	Nation
CAVB Africa	Algeria
CEV Europe	Albania; Bosnia and Herzegovina; Croatia; Cyprus; Greece; France; Italy; Portugal; Spain; Slovenia; Turkey
