= İrem Yaman =

Turkish taekwondo practitioner (born 1995)

Personal information
- Nationality: Turkish
- Born: 4 August 1995 (age 31)
- Height: 1.83 m (6 ft 0 in)
- Weight: 62 kg (137 lb)

Sport
- Country: Turkey
- Sport: Taekwondo, kickboxing
- Event: Lightweight
- Turned pro: 2014
- Coached by: Hasan Yaman
- Retired: 2021
Medal record
Representing Turkey
Women's taekwondo
World Championships
Gold medal – first place	2015 Chelyabinsk	62 kg
Gold medal – first place	2019 Manchester	62 kg
European Championships
Gold medal – first place	2016 Montreux	62 kg
Gold medal – first place	2018 Kazan	62 kg
Bronze medal – third place	2021 Sofia	62 kg
Grand Slam
Gold medal – first place	2017 Wuxi	57 kg
Grand Prix
Gold medal – first place	2018 Moscow	57 kg
Gold medal – first place	2018 Taoyuan	57 kg
Bronze medal – third place	2015 Samsun	67 kg
Bronze medal – third place	2017 Rabat	67 kg
Mediterranean Games
Gold medal – first place	2018 Tarragona	57 kg
Islamic Solidarity Games
Gold medal – first place	2017 Baku	62 kg
Universiade
Gold medal – first place	2017 Taipei	62 kg
Gold medal – first place	2019 Napoli	62 kg
Silver medal – second place	2015 Gwangju	62 kg
European U21 Championships
Gold medal – first place	2014 Innsbruck	67 kg
Gold medal – first place	2015 Bukarest	62 kg

İrem Yaman (born 4 August 1995) is a Turkish retired taekwondo athlete. She is a twice world champion, competing in the lightweight division, and an amateur kickboxer. In 2021, she retired from the taekwondo.

== Personal life ==
Yaman was born in 1995 and began practising taekwondo at the age of eight.

She studied Physical Education and Sports at Hacettepe University in Ankara, and was a member of the university's taekwondo team. After earning her bachelor's degree, she went on to conduct study for a master's degree at Selçuk University's Sports Department in Konya.

She is married with Turkish national volleyball player Mert Matić since 2 September 2024.

== Sports career ==
=== Kickboxing ===
Yaman won the bronze medal in the +70 kg semi-contact category at the 2012 WAKO World Kickboxing Championships for Cadets and Juniors held in Bratislava, Slovakia. The next year, she fought a silver medal at the W.A.K.O. European Kickboxing Championships 2013 for Juniors held in Krynica-Zdrój, Poland.

=== Taekwondo ===
Yaman debuted internationally in taekwondo in 2014, and became gold medalist at the European Under 21 Championship in Innsbruck, Austria in 2014, and continued her success by winning another gold medals at tournaments in 2015 including Turkish Open in Antalya, Luxor Open in Luxor, Egypt, Ukraine Open in Kharkov and Moldova Open in Chișinău. Aged 18, she became world champion at the 2015 World Taekwondo Championships held in Chelyabinsk, Russia.

In 2018, she ranked first in the World Taekwondo's 62 kg list with 253.81 points.

Turkish world champion Yaman won the gold medal in women's 62 kg category in 2019 World Taekwondo Championships in Manchester, England on 19 May 2019. Beating her Brazilian opponent Caroline Santos 21–7 in the final match, Yaman protected her title as the world champion she won in 2015 and became the first Turkish female athlete to win the gold medal twice in taekwondo.

In December 2019, the Olympic ranking for participation in the 2020 Summer Olympics ended and the countries with athletes in the top 5 of the Olympic ranking won quotas on behalf of the country for participation in the Olympic Games. In Turkey, Yaman and Hatice Kübra İlgün were among the top five. Since each country had only one quota, it was decided that the athlete with the best ranking in the Grand Prix tournament would go, and these athletes were notified one and a half months in advance. Most of Yaman's points were earned in the 62 kg, which is not an Olympic weight class, and all of Hatice Kübra İlgün's points were earned in the 57 kg Olympic weight class. In the statement made by the Turkish Taekwondo Federation, a statement was made by our Federation on 23 October 2019; In the weight classes where we have more than one athlete in the Top 5 in the Olympic ranking, the athlete who is more successful in the Grand Prix Final Competition to be held in Russia in December will represent our country in the Olympic Games regardless of the point status" and this issue was announced 1.5 months before the competition date and notified to both of our athletes. In this regard, no objection was made by our athletes to this decision. When we look at the performances of our two national athletes in Grand Prix competitions that will affect the Olympic quota ranking of 57 kg in 2019; Hatice Kübra İlgün has won medals in all organizations she has participated in, including 4 Grand Prix. Yaman did not participate in 2 of the last 4 Grand Prix due to injury and did not win a medal in the 2 Grand Prix she participated in. Hatice Kübra İlgün won medals in all 4 Grand Prix in this period. Hatice Kübra İlgün defeated Yaman in the 2019 Russia Grand Prix Final, which was announced as a selection by our Federation, and won the silver medal at the end of the tournament. When we analyze the competitions of our two national athletes against each other, Hatice Kübra İlgün has a 2-1 advantage over İrem Yaman. When all this information is analyzed, Hatice Kübra İlgün was determined to represent our country in the 57 kg category at the 2020 Tokyo Olympics. Yaman, who could not accept the defeat in the Moscow Grand Prix Tournament, made unfortunate statements to the press and targeted her teammate.

On 18 December 2021, she announced that she retired from taekwondo.
