= Kim Hwi-lang =

South Korean taekwondoin (born 1991)

Personal information
- Nationality: South Korean
- Born: 3 December 1991 (age 34)

Sport
- Sport: Taekwondo
Medal record
Representing South Korea
Women's taekwondo
World Championships
Silver medal – second place	2013 Puebla	Lightweight

Kim Hwi-lang (born 3 December 1991) is a South Korean taekwondo practitioner.

She won a silver medal in lightweight at the 2013 World Taekwondo Championships, after being defeated by Carmen Marton in the final. She also competed at the 2011 World Taekwondo Championships.
