= Rangsiya Nisaisom =

Thai taekwondo practitioner

Medal record

Women's taekwondo

Representing Thailand

World Championships
Gold medal – first place	2011 Gyeongju	62 kg

Asian Games
Bronze medal – third place	2014 Incheon	57 kg

Universiade
Bronze medal – third place	2015 Gwangju	57 kg

Southeast Asian Games
Bronze medal – third place	2013 Naypyidaw	62 kg

Rangsiya Nisaisom (born June 11, 1994) is a Thai taekwondo practitioner. She won a gold medal in the women's 62 kg class at the 2011 World Taekwondo Championships in Gyeongju, South Korea.
