= Marta Calvo =

Spanish taekwondo practitioner

Personal information
- Full name: Marta Calvo Gómez
- Nationality: Spanish
- Born: 29 August 1996 (age 29) Leganés, Spain

Sport
- Country: Spain
- Sport: Taekwondo
- Event: 62 kg (lightweight)
Medal record
World Championships
Silver medal – second place	2015 Chelyabinsk	62 kg
Grand Prix
Silver medal – second place	2017 Abidjan	57 kg
Silver medal – second place	2018 Rome	57 kg
European Championships
Silver medal – second place	2018 Kazan	62 kg
Mediterranean Games
Bronze medal – third place	2018 Tarragona	57 kg
Universiade
Bronze medal – third place	2015 Gwangju	62 kg
European U21 Championships
Gold medal – first place	2014 Innsbruck	62 kg
European Junior Championships
Silver medal – second place	2013 Porto	59 kg
Bronze medal – third place	2011 Pafos	55 kg

Marta Calvo Gómez (born 29 August 1996) is a Spanish taekwondo practitioner who competes in the 62 kg division. She won the silver medal at the 2015 World Taekwondo Championships on the women's lightweight category and later became the vice champion of Europe after she won the silver medal at the 2018 European Taekwondo Championships also in the 62 kg (lightweight) category. Her sister, Eva Calvo, is also a taekwondo competitor who won a silver medal at the 2016 Summer Olympics.
