= Serbia at the 2018 Mediterranean Games =

- IOC code: SRB
- NOC: Olympic Committee of Serbia
- Competitors: 138 in 27 sports
- Flag bearer: Davor Štefanek
- Medals Ranked 7th: Gold 12 Silver 11 Bronze 9 Total 32

Mediterranean Games appearances (overview)
- 2009; 2013; 2018; 2022

Other related appearances
- Yugoslavia (1951–1991); Serbia and Montenegro (1997–2005); Kosovo (2018–pres.)

Serbia competed at the 2018 Mediterranean Games in Tarragona, Catalonia, Spain over 10 days from 22 June to 1 July 2018.

== Medals by sport ==
Sport	Gold	Silver	Bronze	Total
Swimming	3	5	0	8
Shooting	3	1	0	4
Judo	1	2	0	3
Canoeing	1	1	1	3
Taekwondo	1	0	2	3
Karate	1	0	1	2
Athletics	1	0	0	1
Water polo	1	0	0	1
Wrestling	0	1	3	4
Rowing	0	1	0	1
Boxing	0	0	2	2
Totals (11 entries)	12	11	9	32

== Medalists ==
Medal	Name	Sport	Event	Date
Gold	Jelena Milivojčević	Karate	−50 kg	23 June
Gold	Damir Mikec	Shooting	10 m air pistol	23 June
Gold	Velimir Stjepanović	Swimming	200 m freestyle	23 June
Gold	Andrej Barna; Ivan Lenđer; Uroš Nikolić; Velimir Stjepanović	Swimming	4 × 100 m freestyle relay	23 June
Gold	Milica Starović	Canoeing	K-1 500 m	24 June
Gold	Andrea Arsović	Shooting	10 m air rifle	24 June
Gold	Milutin Stefanović	Shooting	10 m air rifle	24 June
Gold	Velimir Stjepanović	Swimming	200 m butterfly	25 June
Gold	Ivana Španović	Athletics	Long jump	27 June
Gold	Žarko Ćulum	Judo	+100 kg	29 June
Gold	Ana Bajić	Taekwondo	+67 kg	30 June
Gold	Serbia men's national water polo team: Milan Aleksić; Miloš Ćuk; Filip Filipović; Nikola Jakšić; Dušan Mandić; Branislav Mitrović; Stefan Mitrović; Duško Pijetlović; Gojko Pijetlović; Sava Ranđelović; Strahinja Rašović; Viktor Rašović; Nemanja Ubović	Water polo	Men's tournament	July 1
Silver	Zorana Arunović	Shooting	10 m air pistol	23 June
Silver	Anja Crevar	Swimming	400 m individual medley	23 June
Silver	Marko Dragosavljević	Canoeing	K-1 200 m	24 June
Silver	Čaba Silađi	Swimming	100 m breaststroke	24 June
Silver	Andrej Barna; Aleksa Bobar; Uroš Nikolić; Velimir Stjepanović	Swimming	4 × 200 m freestyle relay	24 June
Silver	Čaba Silađi	Swimming	50 m breaststroke	25 June
Silver	Aleksa Bobar; Ivan Lenđer; Čaba Silađi; Velimir Stjepanović	Swimming	4 × 100 m medley relay	25 June
Silver	Davor Štefanek	Wrestling	Greco-Roman 77 kg	25 June
Silver	Milica Nikolić	Judo	48 kg	27 June
Silver	Nemanja Majdov	Judo	90 kg	28 June
Silver	Marko Marjanović	Rowing	Single sculls	30 June
Bronze	Vladimir Torubarov; Ervin Holpert	Canoeing	K-2 500 m	24 June
Bronze	Slobodan Bitević	Karate	+84 kg	24 June
Bronze	Vladimir Stankić	Wrestling	Greco-Roman 87 kg	25 June
Bronze	Mikheil Kajaia	Wrestling	Greco-Roman 97 kg	25 June
Bronze	Stevan Mićić	Wrestling	Freestyle 65 kg	26 June
Bronze	Vanja Stanković	Taekwondo	49 kg	28 June
Bronze	Miloš Gladović	Taekwondo	58 kg	29 June
Bronze	Trifun Dašić	Boxing	Middleweight	29 June
Bronze	Dušan Janjić	Boxing	Flyweight	29 June

== Archery ==
Men

Athlete	Event	Ranking round		Round of 64	Round of 32	Round of 16	Quarterfinals	Semifinals	Final / BM	
Athlete	Event	Score	Seed	Opposition Score	Opposition Score	Opposition Score	Opposition Score	Opposition Score	Opposition Score	Rank
Aleksandar Beatović	Individual	304	29	Bouakaz (ALG); W 6-2	Alvariño Garcia (ESP); L 2-6	Did not advance				
Nikola Stefanović	Individual	315	22	Bye	Koenig (FRA); L 3-7	Did not advance				

== Athletics ==
Key

- Note – Ranks given for track events are within the athlete's heat only
- Q = Qualified for the next round
- q = Qualified for the next round as a fastest loser or, in field events, by position without achieving the qualifying target
- NR = National record
- N/A = Round not applicable for the event
- Bye = Athlete not required to compete in round

Men
Track & road events

Athlete	Event	Semifinal		Final	
Athlete	Event	Result	Rank	Result	Rank
Elzan Bibić	1500 m	Did not finish			
Elzan Bibić	5000 m	—N/a		14:32.05	13

Women
Track & road events

Athlete	Event	Semifinal		Final	
Athlete	Event	Result	Rank	Result	Rank
Zorana Barjaktarović	100 m	12.06	5	Did not advance	
Zorana Barjaktarović	200 m	24.04	5	Did not advance	
Amela Terzić	800 m	2:08.38 SB	5	Did not advance	
Amela Terzić	1500 m	—N/a		4:19.13	7

Field events

Athlete	Event	Final	
Athlete	Event	Distance	Position
Ivana Španović	Long jump	7.04	1st place, gold medalist(s)

== Badminton ==
Men

Athlete	Event	Round of 32	Round of 16	Quarterfinal	Semifinal	Final / BM	
Athlete	Event	Opposition Score	Opposition Score	Opposition Score	Opposition Score	Opposition Score	Rank
Andrija Doder	Men's singles	Bye	Popov (FRA); L (11-21, 9-21)	Did not advance			
Luka Milić	Men's singles	Bye	Maddaloni (ITA); L (13-21, 19–21)	Did not advance			
Andrija Doder; Luka Milić	Men's doubles	—N/a	Galvas / Skarlatos (GRE); W (19-21, 21–19, 21–15)	Koca / Salim (TUR); L (13-21, 10–21)	Did not advance		

== Basketball 3x3 ==
Athlete	Event	Group matches				Quarterfinals	Semifinals	Final / BM	
Athlete	Event	Opposition Score	Opposition Score	Opposition Score	Rank	Opposition Score	Opposition Score	Opposition Score	Rank
Marko Milaković; Stefan Simić; Luka Stefanović; Nikola Šućov	Men's Tournament	(Andorra) Andorra; W 22-10	(North Macedonia) Macedonia; W 21-10	—N/a	1 Q	(Greece) Greece; L 13-19	Did not advance		
Ines Ćorda; Anja Spasojević; Bojana Stevanović; Julijana Vojinović	Women's Tournament	(Turkey) Turkey; W 22-13	(Italy) Italy; L 11-21	(France) France; L 14-21	2 Q	—N/a	(Spain) Spain; L 4-22	(Portugal) Portugal; L 20-21	4

== Beach volleyball ==
Athlete	Event	Preliminary round			Standing	1/8 Finals	Quarterfinals	Semifinals	Final / BM	
Athlete	Event	Opposition Score	Opposition Score	Opposition Score	Standing	Opposition Score	Opposition Score	Opposition Score	Opposition Score	Rank
Stefan Basta; Lazar Kolarić	Men's	Abosaud / Elhoush (LBA); W 2-0 (21-14, 21–10)	Mermer / Urlu (TUR); W 2-1 (19-21, 21–17, 22–20)	—N/a	1 Q	El Graoui / Farabi (MAR); W 2-0 (21-14, 21–11)	Rossi / Caminati (ITA); L 0-2 (19-21, 21–23)	Did not advance		
Katarina Raičević; Nataša Savović	Women's	Placette / Richard (FRA); L 1-2 (21-17, 16–21, 15–5)	Carro / Soria (ESP); L 0-2 (17-21, 14–21)	Coelho / Paquete (POR); W 2-1 (21-15, 12–21, 15–13)	3	—N/a	Did not advance			

== Bowls ==
Lyonnaise

Athlete	Event	Elimination		Quarterfinal		Semifinal		Final / BM	
Athlete	Event	Score	Rank	Score	Rank	Score	Rank	Score	Rank
Nataša Antonjak	Women's precision throw	16	=8	Did not advance					

== Boxing ==
Men

Athlete	Event	Round of 16	Quarterfinals	Semifinals	Final	
Athlete	Event	Opposition Result	Opposition Result	Opposition Result	Opposition Result	Rank
Dušan Janjić	Flyweight	Bye	Abdelrahman (EGY); W 3-1	Mascunano (ESP); L 0-5	Did not advance	3rd place, bronze medalist(s)
Damjan Grmuša	Light welterweight	Kramou (ALG); L 1-4	Did not advance			
Trifun Dašić	Middleweight	Abdelmoneim (EGY); W 3-0	Kokkinos (CYP); W 4-1	Ghosoun (SYR); L 0-5	Did not advance	3rd place, bronze medalist(s)
Marko Docić	Heavyweight	—N/a	Filipi (CRO); L RSC	Did not advance		

== Canoeing ==
Men

Athlete	Event	Heats		Semifinals		Final	
Athlete	Event	Time	Rank	Time	Rank	Time	Rank
Marko Dragosavljević	K-1 200 m	34.696	1 Q	Bye		34.603	2nd place, silver medalist(s)
Stefan Vekić	K-1 500 m	1:39.961	2 Q	Bye		1:41.256	6
Vladimir Torubarov; Ervin Holpert	K-2 500 m	1:31.558	1 Q	Bye		1:30.168	3rd place, bronze medalist(s)

Women

Athlete	Event	Heats		Semifinals		Final	
Athlete	Event	Time	Rank	Time	Rank	Time	Rank
Milica Starović	K-1 200 m	41.638	2 Q	Bye		40.912	4
Milica Starović	K-1 500 m	1:53.133	2 Q	Bye		1:53.637	1st place, gold medalist(s)

Legend: FA = Qualify to final (medal); FB = Qualify to final B (non-medal)

== Cycling ==
Men

Athlete	Event	Time	Rank
Dušan Kalaba	Road race	Did not finish	
Dušan Rajović	Road race	Did not finish	
Dušan Rajović	Time trial	32:09.63	11
Veljko Stojnić	Road race	3:44:56	20
Veljko Stojnić	Time trial	31:16.69	6

Women

Athlete	Event	Time	Rank
Jelena Erić	Road race	2:43:22	12

== Fencing ==
Women

Athlete	Event	Group stage							Round of 16	Quarterfinal	Semifinal	Final / BM	
Athlete	Event	Opposition Score	Opposition Score	Opposition Score	Opposition Score	Opposition Score	Opposition Score	Rank	Opposition Score	Opposition Score	Opposition Score	Opposition Score	Rank
Ana Sel	Individual épée	Cisneros Gavin (Spain); L 4-5	Tannous (Lebanon); L 4-5	Foietta (Italy); L 3-4	Rembi (France); L 2-5	Mavrikiou (Cyprus); W 5-3	Sidiropoulou (Greece); L 2-5	6 Q	Kiskapusi Frank (Spain); L 7-15	Did not advance			

== Golf ==
Athlete	Event	Round 1	Round 2	Round 3	Round 4	Total		
Athlete	Event	Score	Score	Score	Score	Score	Par	Rank
Branimir Ante Gudelj	Men's individual	81	74	71	73	299	+11	=25
Mihailo Dimitrijević	Men's individual	80	74	70	70	294	+6	=16
Branimir Ante Gudelj; Mihailo Dimitrijević	Men's team	161	148	141	143	593	+17	9

== Gymnastics ==
=== Artistic gymnastics ===
Men

Athlete	Event	Qualification								Final							
Athlete	Event	Apparatus						Total	Rank	Apparatus						Total	Rank
Athlete	Event	F	PH	R	V	PB	HB	Total	Rank	F	PH	R	V	PB	HB	Total	Rank
Bojan Dejanović	All-around	13.150	12.700	11.200	13.450	11.850	11.650	74.000	24 Q	13.050	10.800	11.850	13.900	11.650	12.600	73.850	18

Women

Athlete	Event	Qualification						Final					
Athlete	Event	Apparatus				Total	Rank	Apparatus				Total	Rank
Athlete	Event	V	UB	BB	F	Total	Rank	V	UB	BB	F	Total	Rank
Tamara Mrđenović	All-around	13.000	11.900	11.550	12.250 Q	48.700	11 Q	Did not start					

Apparatus

Athlete	Event	Final	
Athlete	Event	Total	Rank
Tamara Mrđenović	Balance beam	Did not start	

=== Rhythmic gymnastics ===
Athlete	Event	Qualification						Final					
Athlete	Event	Hoop	Ball	Clubs	Ribbon	Total	Rank	Hoop	Ball	Clubs	Ribbon	Total	Rank
Nastasija Gvozdić	All-around	12.450	11.900	12.100	10.250	46.700	15	Did not advance					

== Handball ==
=== Men's tournament ===
Roster

- Aleksandar Milenković
- Dejan Milosavljev
- Viktor Matičić
- Stevan Sretenović
- Darko Stevanović
- Milan Vučković
- Aleksandar Babić
- Nemanja Gojković
- Borivoje Đukić
- Milan Milić
- Predrag Vejin
- Nemanja Živković
- Mladen Šotić
- Vukašin Vorkapić
- Vladimir Jevtić
- Nemanja Ratković

Group stage

Pos	Team	Pld	W	D	L	GF	GA	GD	Pts	Qualification
1	Turkey	3	2	1	0	84	74	+10	5	Quarterfinals
2	Serbia	3	1	1	1	95	88	+7	3	Quarterfinals
3	Egypt	3	1	0	2	91	102	−11	2 (Note: Egypt 34–29 Macedonia)	
4	North Macedonia	3	1	0	2	86	92	−6	2	

Source: Tarragona 2018
Rules for classification: 1) Points; 2) Head-to-head points; 3) Head-to-head goal difference; 4) Head-to-head goals scored; 5) Goal difference; 6) Goals scored; 7) Draw.
Notes:

23 June 2018; 18:30	Egypt	33–42	Serbia	Campclar Sports Palace, Tarragona; Referees: Deche, Ghouarda (ALG)
23 June 2018; 18:30	Mahmoud 13	(11–18)	Sretenović, Vorkapić 7	Campclar Sports Palace, Tarragona; Referees: Deche, Ghouarda (ALG)
23 June 2018; 18:30	2× (yellow card) 4× (suspension)	Report	3× (yellow card) 7× (suspension)	Campclar Sports Palace, Tarragona; Referees: Deche, Ghouarda (ALG)

24 June 2018; 18:30	Serbia	24–24	Turkey	Campclar Sports Palace, Tarragona; Referees: Alperan, Scevola (ITA)
24 June 2018; 18:30	Sretenović 8	(13–14)	Sarak 8	Campclar Sports Palace, Tarragona; Referees: Alperan, Scevola (ITA)
24 June 2018; 18:30	3× (yellow card) 3× (suspension)	Report	3× (yellow card) 5× (suspension)	Campclar Sports Palace, Tarragona; Referees: Alperan, Scevola (ITA)

25 June 2018; 18:30	Serbia	29–31	North Macedonia	Campclar Sports Palace, Tarragona; Referees: Macías, Ruiz (ESP)
25 June 2018; 18:30	Milić 6	(15–16)	Popovski 6	Campclar Sports Palace, Tarragona; Referees: Macías, Ruiz (ESP)
25 June 2018; 18:30	2× (yellow card) 4× (suspension)	Report	2× (yellow card) 3× (suspension) 1× (red card)	Campclar Sports Palace, Tarragona; Referees: Macías, Ruiz (ESP)

Quarterfinals

27 June 2018; 17:30	Spain	35–25	Serbia	Campclar Sports Palace, Tarragona; Referees: Deche, Ghouarda (ALG)
27 June 2018; 17:30	Odriozola 6	(20–11)	Milić 5	Campclar Sports Palace, Tarragona; Referees: Deche, Ghouarda (ALG)
27 June 2018; 17:30	3× (yellow card) 4× (suspension)	Report	3× (yellow card) 4× (suspension)	Campclar Sports Palace, Tarragona; Referees: Deche, Ghouarda (ALG)

5–8th place semifinals

28 June 2018; 20:00	Slovenia	33–26	Serbia	Campclar Sports Palace, Tarragona; Referees: Pinto, Santos (POR)
28 June 2018; 20:00	Grzentič 6	(15–14)	Živković 7	Campclar Sports Palace, Tarragona; Referees: Pinto, Santos (POR)
28 June 2018; 20:00	2× (yellow card) 3× (suspension) 1× (red card)	Report	1× (yellow card) 4× (suspension)	Campclar Sports Palace, Tarragona; Referees: Pinto, Santos (POR)

Seventh place game

30 June 2018; 10:00	Algeria	30–28	Serbia	Campclar Sports Palace, Tarragona; Referees: Hoz, Riloba (ESP)
30 June 2018; 10:00	Abdi 10	(16–14)	Matičić 7	Campclar Sports Palace, Tarragona; Referees: Hoz, Riloba (ESP)
30 June 2018; 10:00	2× (yellow card) 5× (suspension) 1× (red card)	Report	2× (yellow card) 5× (suspension)	Campclar Sports Palace, Tarragona; Referees: Hoz, Riloba (ESP)

=== Women's tournament ===
Roster

- Marijana Ilić
- Katarina Kosanović
- Dijana Radojević
- Milica Rančić
- Marija Obradović
- Katarina Stošić
- Gordana Mitrović
- Tamara Radojević
- Aleksandra Vukajlović
- Lidija Cvijić
- Anđela Janjušević
- Jelena Terzić
- Nataša Atanasković
- Jovana Bogojević
- Jelena Agbaba
- Jovana Milojević

Group stage

Pos	Team	Pld	W	D	L	GF	GA	GD	Pts	Qualification
1	Montenegro	4	4	0	0	132	85	+47	8	Semifinals
2	North Macedonia	4	3	0	1	108	96	+12	6	Semifinals
3	Turkey	4	2	0	2	121	127	−6	4	5th place game
4	Serbia	4	1	0	3	108	118	−10	2	7th place game
5	Egypt	4	0	0	4	91	134	−43	0	

Rules for classification: 1) Points; 2) Head-to-head points; 3) Head-to-head goal difference; 4) Head-to-head goals scored; 5) Goal difference; 6) Goals scored; 7) Draw.

23 June 2018; 10:00	Montenegro	36–22	Serbia	Pabellón CE Vendrell, El Vendrell
23 June 2018; 10:00	Grbić 7	(16–6)	Terzić 5	Pabellón CE Vendrell, El Vendrell
23 June 2018; 10:00	3× (yellow card) 3× (suspension)		1× (yellow card) 1× (suspension)	Pabellón CE Vendrell, El Vendrell

24 June 2018; 10:00	Serbia	33–21	Egypt	Pabellón CE Vendrell, El Vendrell; Referees: Pinto, Santos (POR)
24 June 2018; 10:00	Janjušević, Rančić 5	(16–10)	Attiatalla 8	Pabellón CE Vendrell, El Vendrell; Referees: Pinto, Santos (POR)
24 June 2018; 10:00	2× (yellow card) 2× (suspension)	Report	2× (yellow card) 1× (suspension)	Pabellón CE Vendrell, El Vendrell; Referees: Pinto, Santos (POR)

25 June 2018; 12:00	Serbia	21–28	North Macedonia	Pabellón CE Vendrell, El Vendrell; Referees: García, Rodríguez (ESP)
25 June 2018; 12:00	Obradović 6	(13–16)	three players 6	Pabellón CE Vendrell, El Vendrell; Referees: García, Rodríguez (ESP)
25 June 2018; 12:00	1× (yellow card) 4× (suspension)	Report	1× (yellow card) 7× (suspension)	Pabellón CE Vendrell, El Vendrell; Referees: García, Rodríguez (ESP)

28 June 2018; 10:00	Serbia	32–33	Turkey	Pabellón CE Vendrell, El Vendrell; Referees: Ivanović, Vujisić (MNE)
28 June 2018; 10:00	Obradović 8	(17–15)	İskit 8	Pabellón CE Vendrell, El Vendrell; Referees: Ivanović, Vujisić (MNE)
28 June 2018; 10:00	2× (yellow card) 3× (suspension)	Report	3× (yellow card) 2× (suspension)	Pabellón CE Vendrell, El Vendrell; Referees: Ivanović, Vujisić (MNE)

Seventh place game

29 June 2018
17:30
Portugal
31–30 (ET)
Serbia
Pabellón CE Vendrell, El Vendrell
Referees: Alperan, Scevola (ITA)
Correia 9
(16–15)
Vukajlović 7
2× (yellow card) 6× (suspension) 1× (red card)
Report
3× (yellow card) 4× (suspension)

FT: 27–27 ET: 4–3

== Judo ==
Men

Athlete	Event	Round of 16	Quarterfinals	Semifinals	Repechage 1	Repechage 2	Final / BM	
Athlete	Event	Opposition Result	Opposition Result	Opposition Result	Opposition Result	Opposition Result	Opposition Result	Rank
Nemanja Majdov	−90 kg	Bye	Elias (LIB); W 100-0	Tselidis (GRE); W 10-0	Bye		Sherazadishvili (ESP); L 10-110	2nd place, silver medalist(s)
Žarko Ćulum	+100 kg	Bye	Dragič (SLO); W 100-0	Sadiković (BIH); W 10-0	Bye		D'Arco (ITA); W 100-0	1st place, gold medalist(s)

Women

Athlete	Event	Round of 16	Quarterfinals	Semifinals	Repechage 1	Repechage 2	Final / BM	
Athlete	Event	Opposition Result	Opposition Result	Opposition Result	Opposition Result	Opposition Result	Opposition Result	Rank
Milica Nikolić	−48 kg	Bye	Mecerem (ALG); W 100-0	Lokmanhekim (TUR); W 100-0	Bye		Figueroa Peña (ESP); L 0-100	2nd place, silver medalist(s)
Andrea Stojadinov	−52 kg	El Qorachi (MAR); W 100-0	Gneto (FRA); L 0-100	Did not advance				
Marica Perišić	−57 kg	Boi (ITA); L 0-100	Did not advance		Iraoui (MAR); L 0-10	Did not advance		
Jovana Obradović	−63 kg	Fazliu (KOS); W 10-0	Belattar (MAR); W 100-10	Bjaoui (TUN); L 0-110	Bye		Dekete (FRA); L 0-110	5

== Karate ==
Men

Athlete	Event	Round of 16	Quarterfinals	Semifinals	Repechage	Final / BM	
Athlete	Event	Opposition Result	Opposition Result	Opposition Result	Opposition Result	Opposition Result	Rank
Marko Antić	−60 kg	Bye	Azzoauzi (TUN); L 0-2	Did not advance	Salama (EGY); L 0-0	Did not advance	7
Dejan Cvrkota	−84 kg	Arenas Zapata (ESP); W 1-0	Hernandez (POR); W 1-0	Jakupi (MKD); L 1-2	Bye	Martina (ITA); L 0-0	5
Slobodan Bitević	+84 kg	Elasfar (EGY); L 0-2	Did not advance		Nishevci (KOS); W 2-0	Klouz (FRA); W 0-0	3rd place, bronze medalist(s)

Women

Athlete	Event	Round of 16	Quarterfinals	Semifinals	Repechage	Final / BM	
Athlete	Event	Opposition Result	Opposition Result	Opposition Result	Opposition Result	Opposition Result	Rank
Jelena Milivojčević	−50 kg	Bye	Rashed (EGY); W 1-1	Kavakopoulou (GRE); W 0-0	Bye	Sayah (MAR); W 0-0	1st place, gold medalist(s)
Dina Durmiš	−55 kg	Ouhammad (MAR); W 1-0	Drašković (MNE); L 0-5	Did not advance	Bye	Ouihaddadene (FRA); L 0-4	5
Sanja Cvrkota	−68 kg	Bye	Eltemur (TUR); L 0-4	Did not advance	Errabi (MAR); L 2-3	Did not advance	7

== Rowing ==
Men

Athlete	Event	Heats		Repechage		Final	
Athlete	Event	Time	Rank	Time	Rank	Time	Rank
Marko Marjanović	Single sculls	3:13.434	1 FA	Bye		3:16.628	2nd place, silver medalist(s)
Aleksandar Beđik; Igor Đerić	Double sculls	2:58.701	1 FA	Bye		03:06.649	5

== Sailing ==
Women

Athlete	Event	Race											Net points	Final rank
Athlete	Event	1	2	3	4	5	6	7	8	9	10	M*	Net points	Final rank
Ksenija Joksimović	Laser Radial	13	12	13	11	13	11	11	10	10	13	13	117	13

== Shooting ==
Men

Athlete	Event	Qualification		Final	
Athlete	Event	Points	Rank	Points	Rank
Dimitrije Grgić	10 m air pistol	577	4 Q	156.1	6
Damir Mikec	10 m air pistol	578	3 Q	240.9 MGR	1st place, gold medalist(s)
Lazar Kovačević	10 m air rifle	617.7	7	205.0	4
Milutin Stefanović	10 m air rifle	622.3	1	247.5 MGR	1st place, gold medalist(s)
Dušan Nikolić	Trap	116	12	Did not advance	
Borko Vasiljević	Trap	118	7	Did not advance	

Women

Athlete	Event	Qualification		Final	
Athlete	Event	Points	Rank	Points	Rank
Zorana Arunović	10 m air pistol	568	3	239.9	2nd place, silver medalist(s)
Bobana Momčilović Veličković	10 m air pistol	572	2	194.5	4
Andrea Arsović	10 m air rifle	624.4	2	246.9 MGR	1st place, gold medalist(s)
Milica Babić	10 m air rifle	621.8	8	183.7	5

== Swimming ==
Men

Athlete	Event	Heat		Final	
Athlete	Event	Time	Rank	Time	Rank
Andrej Barna	50 m freestyle	22.57	5 Q	22.60	7
Andrej Barna	100 m freestyle	49.96	7 Q	49.69	6
Aleksa Bobar	200 m freestyle	1:51.24	12	Did not advance	
Aleksa Bobar	200 m butterfly	2:06.12	14	Did not advance	
Ivan Lenđer	50 m butterfly	24.32	6	24.12	6
Ivan Lenđer	100 m butterfly	53.94	6 Q	54.08	8
Uroš Nikolić	50 m freestyle	23.12	11	Did not advance	
Čaba Silađi	50 m breaststroke	27.58	2 Q	27.31	2nd place, silver medalist(s)
Čaba Silađi	100 m breaststroke	1:00.67	1 Q	1:00.46	2nd place, silver medalist(s)
Velimir Stjepanović	100 m freestyle	49.40	4 Q	49.47	4
Velimir Stjepanović	200 m freestyle	1:49.91	3 Q	1:47.13	1st place, gold medalist(s)
Velimir Stjepanović	200 m butterfly	1:59.43	2 Q	1:56.93	1st place, gold medalist(s)
Andrej Barna; Ivan Lenđer; Uroš Nikolić; Velimir Stjepanović	4 × 100 m freestyle relay	—N/a		3:15.76	1st place, gold medalist(s)
Andrej Barna; Aleksa Bobar; Uroš Nikolić; Velimir Stjepanović	4 × 200 m freestyle relay	—N/a		7:18.57	2nd place, silver medalist(s)
Aleksa Bobar; Ivan Lenđer; Čaba Silađi; Velimir Stjepanović	4 × 100 m medley relay	—N/a		3:38.44 NR	2nd place, silver medalist(s)

Women

Athlete	Event	Heat		Final	
Athlete	Event	Time	Rank	Time	Rank
Anja Crevar	400 m freestyle	4:14.24	4 Q	4:12.88	5
Anja Crevar	200 m individual medley	2:15.40	2 Q	2:15.58	5
Anja Crevar	400 m individual medley	4:43.9	3 Q	4:40.62 NR	2nd place, silver medalist(s)

== Table tennis ==
Women

Athlete	Event	Round Robin 1				Round Robin 2				Quarterfinal	Semifinal	Final / BM	
Athlete	Event	Opposition Score	Opposition Score	Opposition Score	Rank	Opposition Score	Opposition Score	Opposition Score	Rank	Opposition Score	Opposition Score	Opposition Score	Rank
Izabela Lupulesku	Singles	Morri (SMR); W 4–0	Zarif (FRA); L 3–4	Khoury (LBN); W 4–0	2 Q	Loeuillette (FRA); W 4–2	Altinkaya (TUR); W 4–1	Xiao (ESP); W 4–2	1 Q	Hadžiahmetović (BIH); W 4–2	Meshref (EGY); L 1–4	Dvorak (ESP); L 3–4	4
Aneta Maksuti	Singles	Galic (SLO); L 2–4	Katillari (ALB); W 4–0	Altinkaya (TUR); L 1–4	3	Did not advance							
Tijana Jokić; Izabela Lupulesku; Aneta Maksuti	Team	Egypt (EGY); L 1–3	Bosnia and Herzegovina (BIH); W 3–0	—N/a	2 Q	—N/a				France (FRA); L 0–3	Did not advance		

== Taekwondo ==
Men

Athlete	Event	Round of 16	Quarterfinals	Semifinals	Final	
Athlete	Event	Opposition Result	Opposition Result	Opposition Result	Opposition Result	Rank
Miloš Gladović	−58 kg	Bonnet (FRA); W 27-12	Dell'Aquila (ITA); W 25-23	Bragança (POR); L 8-10	Did not advance	3rd place, bronze medalist(s)
Nikola Vučković	−68 kg	Spinosa (ITA); L 4-5	Did not advance			
Damir Fejzić	−80 kg	Maiani (SMR); W 12-4	Martinez Garcia (ESP); L 2-14	Did not advance		
Draško Jovanov	+80 kg	Bye	Miangue (FRA); L 5-6	Did not advance		

Women

Athlete	Event	Round of 16	Quarterfinals	Semifinals	Final	
Athlete	Event	Opposition Result	Opposition Result	Opposition Result	Opposition Result	Rank
Vanja Stanković	−49 kg	Bye	Abdelsalam (EGY); W 13-0	Tomić (CRO); L 8-20	Did not advance	3rd place, bronze medalist(s)
Aleksandra Radmilović	−57 kg	Laaraj (MAR); W 12-10	Glasnović (CRO); L 8-19	Did not advance		
Nađa Savković	−67 kg	Layouni (TUN); W 5-4	Wahba (EGY); L 0-3	Did not advance		
Ana Bajić	+67 kg	Bye	Giacomini (ITA); W 4-0	Kuş (TUR); W 1-1	Blé (FRA); W 5-1	1st place, gold medalist(s)

== Triathlon ==
Men

Athlete	Event	Swim	Trans 1	Bike	Trans 2	Run	Total Time	Rank
Ognjen Stojanović	Individual sprint	10:12	0:32	31:10	0:24	16:23	58:39	4

== Water polo ==
=== Men's tournament ===
Roster

- Milan Aleksić
- Miloš Ćuk
- Filip Filipović
- Nikola Jakšić
- Dušan Mandić
- Branislav Mitrović
- Stefan Mitrović
- Duško Pijetlović
- Gojko Pijetlović
- Sava Ranđelović
- Strahinja Rašović
- Viktor Rašović
- Nemanja Ubović

Group stage

Pos	Team	Pld	W	W+	L+	L	GF	GA	GD	Pts	Qualification
1	Serbia	3	3	0	0	0	41	10	+31	9	Final
2	Montenegro	3	2	0	0	1	41	12	+29	6	3rd place game
3	France	3	1	0	0	2	23	33	−10	3	5th place game
4	Portugal	3	0	0	0	3	9	59	−50	0	7th place game

Source: Tarragona 2018

27 June 2018; 18:40	Report	Serbia	6–5	Montenegro	Campclar Aquatic Center, Tarragona
27 June 2018; 18:40	Report	Score by quarters: 1–1, 0–1, 3–1, 2–2			Campclar Aquatic Center, Tarragona
27 June 2018; 18:40	Report	Mandić, Rašović 2	Goals	Radović 2	Campclar Aquatic Center, Tarragona

28 June 2018; 14:20	Report	Serbia	14–4	France	Campclar Aquatic Center, Tarragona
28 June 2018; 14:20	Report	Score by quarters: 4–0, 2–3, 4–0, 4–1			Campclar Aquatic Center, Tarragona
28 June 2018; 14:20	Report	Aleksić, Pijetlović 3	Goals	four players 1	Campclar Aquatic Center, Tarragona

29 June 2018; 14:20	Report	Serbia	21–1	Portugal	Campclar Aquatic Center, Tarragona
29 June 2018; 14:20	Report	Score by quarters: 4–0, 7–0, 3–1, 7–0			Campclar Aquatic Center, Tarragona
29 June 2018; 14:20	Report	Ubović 4	Goals	Secrieru 1	Campclar Aquatic Center, Tarragona

Final

1 July 2018; 12:10	Report	(silver) Greece	10–12 (PSO)	Serbia (gold)	Campclar Aquatic Center, Tarragona
1 July 2018; 12:10	Report	Score by quarters: 1–1, 2–0, 3–4, 2–3 PSO: 2–4			Campclar Aquatic Center, Tarragona
1 July 2018; 12:10	Report	Fountoulis 3	Goals	Filipović, Mandić 3	Campclar Aquatic Center, Tarragona

== Water skiing ==
Men

Athlete	Event	Round 1		Round 2		Final	
Athlete	Event	Points/Time	Rank	Points/Time	Rank	Points/Time	Rank
Srđan Dragić	Slalom	5.00/40	14	0.50/52	7	Did not advance	
Marko Jovičić	Slalom	0.50/52	12	4.00/40	12	Did not advance	

== Weightlifting ==
Men

Athlete	Event	Snatch		Clean & jerk	
Athlete	Event	Result	Rank	Result	Rank
Stevan Vladisavljev	−62 kg	110	6	135	6

== Wrestling ==
Freestyle wrestling

Athlete	Event	Round of 16	Quarterfinal	Semifinal	Repechage	Final / BM	
Athlete	Event	Opposition Result	Opposition Result	Opposition Result	Opposition Result	Opposition Result	Rank
Stevan Mićić	−65 kg	Bye	Ansari (MAR); W 10-0	Kilicsallayan (TUR); L 4-8	Bye	Aly (EGY); W 8-7	3rd place, bronze medalist(s)

Greco-Roman wrestling

Athlete	Event	Round of 16	Quarterfinal	Semifinal	Repechage	Final / BM	
Athlete	Event	Opposition Result	Opposition Result	Opposition Result	Opposition Result	Opposition Result	Rank
Kristijan Fris	−67 kg	Ghaiou (ALG); W 2-1	Firat (TUR); L 1-7	Did not advance			
Davor Štefanek	−77 kg	Bye	Prevolarakis (GRE); W ?	Margaryan (FRA); W 5-1	Bye	Başar (TUR); L 0-5	2nd place, silver medalist(s)
Vladimir Stankić	−87 kg	Bye	Başar (TUR); L 0-5	Did not advance	Bye	Garcia Perez (ESP); W 4-1	3rd place, bronze medalist(s)
Mikheil Kajaia	−97 kg	Bye	Kesidis (GRE); W 9-1	Noumonvi (FRA); L 2-5	Bye	Demirci (TUR); W 2-2	3rd place, bronze medalist(s)
