= Canoeing at the 2018 Mediterranean Games – Men's K-1 200 metres =

Men's canoe sprint K-1 200 metres at the 2018 Mediterranean Games
- Venue: Canal Olímpic de Catalunya
- Date: 23–24 June 2018
- Competitors: 13 from 13 nations
- Winning time: 34.148

Medalists
| gold medal | Carlos Garrote | Spain |
| silver medal | Marko Dragosavljević | Serbia |
| bronze medal | Maxime Beaumont | France |

The men's canoe sprint K-1 200 metres at the 2018 Mediterranean Games in Tarragona took place between 23 and 24 June at the Canal Olímpic de Catalunya.

== Schedule ==
All times are Spain time (UTC+02:00)

| Date | Time | Round |
|---|---|---|
| Saturday, 23 June 2018 | 10:10; 12:40 | Heats; Semifinal |
| Sunday, 24 June 2018 | 11:00 | Final |

== Results ==
=== Heats ===
==== Heat 1 ====
| Rank | Canoer | Country | Time | Notes |
|---|---|---|---|---|
| 1 | Carlos Garrote | Spain | 35.530 | QF |
| 2 | Messias Baptista | Portugal | 36.293 | QF |
| 3 | Rok Šmit | Slovenia | 36.336 | QF |
| 4 | Antun Novaković | Croatia | 36.874 | QS |
| 5 | Yassine Mekki | Tunisia | 39.361 | QS |
| 6 | Nacer Eddin Baghdadi | Algeria | 40.046 | QS |
| 7 | Ali Ahmed | Egypt | 40.487 | QS |

==== Heat 2 ====
| Rank | Canoer | Country | Time | Notes |
|---|---|---|---|---|
| 1 | Marko Dragosavljević | Serbia | 34.696 | QF |
| 2 | Maxime Beaumont | France | 35.131 | QF |
| 3 | Manfredi Rizza | Italy | 35.394 | QF |
| 4 | Ioannis Odysseos | Cyprus | 36.116 | QS |
| 5 | Dimitrios Antoniou | Greece | 36.811 | QS |
| 6 | Serkan Kakkaç | Turkey | 37.071 | QS |

=== Semifinal ===
| Rank | Canoer | Country | Time | Notes |
|---|---|---|---|---|
| 1 | Antun Novaković | Croatia | 35.962 | QF |
| 2 | Ioannis Odysseos | Cyprus | 36.198 | QF |
| 3 | Serkan Kakkaç | Turkey | 36.422 | QF |
| 4 | Dimitrios Antoniou | Greece | 36.502 | |
| 5 | Yassine Mekki | Tunisia | 38.083 | |
| 6 | Nacer Eddin Baghdadi | Algeria | 39.868 | |
| 7 | Ali Ahmed | Egypt | 39.878 | |

=== Final ===
| Rank | Canoer | Country | Time |
|---|---|---|---|
| 1st place, gold medalist(s) | Carlos Garrote | Spain (ESP) | 34.148 |
| 2nd place, silver medalist(s) | Marko Dragosavljević | Serbia (SRB) | 34.603 |
| 3rd place, bronze medalist(s) | Maxime Beaumont | France (FRA) | 34.774 |
| 4 | Manfredi Rizza | Italy (ITA) | 34.912 |
| 5 | Rok Šmit | Slovenia (SLO) | 35.919 |
| 6 | Messias Baptista | Portugal (POR) | 36.130 |
| 7 | Ioannis Odysseos | Cyprus (CYP) | 36.746 |
| 8 | Antun Novaković | Croatia (CRO) | 36.822 |
| 9 | Serkan Kakkaç | Turkey (TUR) | 37.227 |

QF=Qualified for final, QS=Qualified for semifinal
