= Canoeing at the 2018 Mediterranean Games – Men's K-2 500 metres =

Event at The 2018 Mediterranean Games

Men's canoe sprint K-2 500 metres at the 2018 Mediterranean Games
- Venue: Canal Olímpic de Catalunya
- Date: 23–24 June
- Competitors: 22 from 11 nations
- Winning time: 1:27.907

Medalists
gold medal	Marcus Walz; Rodrigo Germade	Spain
silver medal	Franck Le Moël; Guillaume Le Floch Decorchemont	France
bronze medal	Ervin Holpert; Vladimir Torubarov	Serbia

The men's canoe sprint K-2 500 metres at the 2018 Mediterranean Games in Tarragona took place between 23 and 24 June at the Canal Olímpic de Catalunya.

== Schedule ==
All times are Spain time (UTC+02:00)

Date	Time	Round
Saturday, 23 June 2018	10:40; 12:50	Heats; Semifinal
Sunday, 24 June 2018	11:20	Final

== Results ==
=== Heats ===
==== Heat 1 ====
Rank	Canoer	Country	Time	Notes
1	Ervin Holpert; Vladimir Torubarov	Serbia	1:31.558	QF
2	Nicola Ripamonti; Giulio Dressino	Italy	1:32.999	QF
3	Fernando Pimenta; João Ribeiro	Portugal	1:34.367	QF
4	Mustafa Özmen; Yavuz Selim Balcı	Turkey	1:35.441	QS
5	Simon Blažević; Rok Šmit	Slovenia	1:43.309	QS
6	Ioa Koutsopodiotis; Konstant Efthymiadis	Greece	1:43.481	QS

==== Heat 2 ====
Rank	Canoer	Country	Time	Notes
1	Marcus Walz; Rodrigo Germade	Spain	1:31.178	QF
2	Franck Le Moël; Guillaume Le Floch Decorchemont	France	1:31.403	QF
3	Mohamed Ali Mrabet; Yassine Mekki	Tunisia	1:37.566	QF
4	Marios Ioannou; Stefan Kleanthous	Cyprus	1:41.618	QS
5	Nacer Eddine Baghdadi; Abdelkader Akrame Keddi	Algeria	1:43.447	QS
6	Ali Ahmed; Alaaeldin Abousamra	Egypt	Signed off	

=== Semifinal ===
Rank	Canoer	Country	Time	Notes
1	Mustafa Özmen; Yavuz Selim Balcı	Turkey	1:32.044	QF
2	Simon Blažević; Rok Šmit	Slovenia	1:36.301	QF
3	Marios Ioannou; Stefan Kleanthous	Cyprus	1:37.423	QF
4	Ioa Koutsopodiotis; Konstant Efthymiadis	Greece	1:38.503	
5	Nacer Eddine Baghdadi; Abdelkader Akrame Keddi	Algeria	1:48.531	

=== Final ===
Rank	Canoer	Country	Time
1st place, gold medalist(s)	Marcus Walz; Rodrigo Germade	Spain (ESP)	1:27.907
2nd place, silver medalist(s)	Franck Le Moël; Guillaume Le Floch Decorchemont	France (FRA)	1:28.819
3rd place, bronze medalist(s)	Ervin Holpert; Vladimir Torubarov	Serbia (SRB)	1:30.168
4	Fernando Pimenta; João Ribeiro	Portugal (POR)	1:30.418
5	Nicola Ripamonti; Giulio Dressino	Italy (ITA)	1:33.014
6	Mustafa Özmen; Yavuz Selim Balcı	Turkey (TUR)	1:33.703
7	Simon Blažević; Rok Šmit	Slovenia (SLO)	1:34.208
8	Mohamed Ali Mrabet; Yassine Mekki	Tunisia (TUN)	1:39.932
9	Marios Ioannou; Stefan Kleanthous	Cyprus (CYP)	1:46.420

QF=Qualified for final, QS=Qualified for semifinal
