= Taekwondo at the 2018 Mediterranean Games – Women's 67 kg =

Taekwondo competition

Taekwondo – Women's 67 kg at the 2018 Mediterranean Games
- Venue: Salou Pavilion
- Date: 29 June
- Competitors: 11 from 11 nations

Medalists
gold medal	Matea Jelić	Croatia
silver medal	Althéa Laurin	France
bronze medal	Dunja Lemajić	Slovenia
bronze medal	Hedaya Malak	Egypt

The women's 67 kg competition of the taekwondo events at the 2018 Mediterranean Games took place on the 29 of June at the Salou Pavilion.

== Schedule ==
All times are Central European Summer Time (UTC+2).

Date	Time	Round
June 29, 2018	10:00	Preliminaries
June 29, 2018	16:30	Finals

== Results ==
Legend

- PTG — Won by Points Gap
- SUP — Won by superiority
- OT — Won on over time (Golden Point)
- DQ — Won by disqualification
- PUN — Won by punitive declaration
- WD — Won by withdrawal

=== Main bracket ===
Preliminary round
8	Eva Calvo (ESP)	7
9	Chaimae Kriem (MAR)	2
6	Nađa Savković (SRB)	5 (OT)
Amani Layouni (TUN)	4
7	Althéa Laurin (FRA)	11
10	Sofia Cruz (POR)	10

Quarter-finals
1	Matea Jelić (CRO)	10
8	Eva Calvo (ESP)	7
4	Dunja Lemajić (SLO)	19
5	Athanasia Mitsopoulou (GRE)	4
3	Hedaya Malak (EGY)	SUP
6	Nađa Savković (SRB)
7	Althéa Laurin (FRA)	14
2	Daniela Rotolo (ITA)	7

Semi-finals
1	Matea Jelić (CRO)	8
4	Dunja Lemajić (SLO)	2
3	Hedaya Malak (EGY)	2
7	Althéa Laurin (FRA)	16

Gold medal match
1	Matea Jelić (CRO)	9
7	Althéa Laurin (FRA)	7
