= Taekwondo at the 2018 Mediterranean Games – Women's +67 kg =

Taekwondo competition

Taekwondo – Women's +67 kg at the 2018 Mediterranean Games
- Venue: Salou Pavilion
- Date: 30 June
- Competitors: 9 from 9 nations

Medalists
gold medal	Ana Bajić	Serbia
silver medal	Marie-Paule Blé	France
bronze medal	Nafia Kuş	Turkey
bronze medal	Wiam Dislam	Morocco

The women's +67 kg competition of the taekwondo events at the 2018 Mediterranean Games took place on the 30 of June at the Salou Pavilion.

== Schedule ==
All times are Central European Summer Time (UTC+2).

Date	Time	Round
June 30, 2018	10:00	Preliminaries
June 30, 2018	16:00	Finals

== Results ==
Legend

- PTG — Won by Points Gap
- SUP — Won by superiority
- OT — Won on over time (Golden Point)
- DQ — Won by disqualification
- PUN — Won by punitive declaration
- WD — Won by withdrawal

=== Main bracket ===
Preliminary round
9	Linda Azzeddine (ALG)	31
8	Evgenia Sarri (GRE)	19

Quarter-finals
1	Nafia Kuş (TUR)	12
9	Linda Azzeddine (ALG)	1
5	Laura Giacomini (ITA)	0
4	Ana Bajić (SRB)	4
3	Wiam Dislam (MAR)	5
6	Cecilia Castro Burgos (ESP)	4
7	Marie-Paule Blé (FRA)	3
2	Iva Radoš (CRO)	2

Semi-finals
1	Nafia Kuş (TUR)	1
4	Ana Bajić (SRB)	1 (SUP)
3	Wiam Dislam (MAR)	4
7	Marie-Paule Blé (FRA)	6 (OT)

Gold medal match
4	Ana Bajić (SRB)	5
7	Marie-Paule Blé (FRA)	1
