= Judo at the 2018 Mediterranean Games – Women's 48 kg =

Judo competition

Women's 48 kg at the 2018 Mediterranean Games
- Venue: Cambrils Pavilion
- Date: 27 June
- Competitors: 12 from 12 nations

Medalists
gold medal	Julia Figueroa	Spain
silver medal	Milica Nikolić	Serbia
bronze medal	Francesca Milani	Italy
bronze medal	Maruša Štangar	Slovenia

The women's 48 kg competition in judo at the 2018 Mediterranean Games was held on 27 June at the Cambrils Pavilion in Cambrils.

== Schedule ==
All times are Central European Summer Time (UTC+2).

Date	Time	Round
June 27, 2018	10:16	Round of 16
June 27, 2018	11:36	Quarterfinals
June 27, 2018	12:40	Semifinals
June 27, 2018	13:44	Repechage
June 27, 2018	17:00	Bronze medal
June 27, 2018	17:08	Final

== Results ==
=== Main Round ===
Round of 16
Mallaurie Mercadier (FRA)	01
Hadjer Mecerem (ALG)	10
Olfa Saoudi (TUN)	00
Dilara Lokmanhekim (TUR)	11
Francesca Milani (ITA)	10
Vasiliki Kourri (CYP)	00
Aziza Chakir (MAR)	10
Aikaterini Theodorakopoulou (GRE)	00

Quarterfinals
Milica Nikolić (SRB)	10
Hadjer Mecerem (ALG)	00
Joana Diogo (POR)	01
Dilara Lokmanhekim (TUR)	10
Maruša Štangar (SLO)	00
Francesca Milani (ITA)	10
Julia Figueroa (ESP)	10
Aziza Chakir (MAR)	00

Semifinals
Milica Nikolić (SRB)	10
Dilara Lokmanhekim (TUR)	00
Francesca Milani (ITA)	00
Julia Figueroa (ESP)	10

Final
Milica Nikolić (SRB)	00
Julia Figueroa (ESP)	10

=== Repechage ===
Repechage 1		Repechage 2		Bronze medal
		Hadjer Mecerem (ALG)	00
Olfa Saoudi (TUN)	00	Joana Diogo (POR)	10
Joana Diogo (POR)	10			Joana Diogo (POR)	00
				Francesca Milani (ITA)	10

Repechage 1		Repechage 2		Bronze medal
Vasiliki Kourri (CYP)	00
Maruša Štangar (SLO)	10	Maruša Štangar (SLO)	10
		Aziza Chakir (MAR)	00
				Maruša Štangar (SLO)	10
				Dilara Lokmanhekim (TUR)	00
