= Swimming at the 2018 Mediterranean Games =

- Venue: Campclar Aquatic Center
- Dates: 23–25 June

The swimming competitions at the 2018 Mediterranean Games in Tarragona took place between 23 and 25 June at the Campclar Aquatic Center.

Athletes competed in 38 events and 2 paralympic events.

== Schedule ==
| H | Heats | F | Final |

M = Morning session (starting at 09:30), E = Evening session (starting at 17:30)

Men
| Date → | Sat 23 | | Sun 24 | | Mon 25 | |
| Event ↓ | M | E | M | E | M | E |
|---|---|---|---|---|---|---|
| 50 m freestyle | | | | | H | F |
| 100 m freestyle | | | H | F | | |
| 200 m freestyle | H | F | | | | |
| 400 m freestyle | | | | | H | F |
| 1500 m freestyle | | | H | H | | |
| 50 m backstroke | H | F | | | | |
| 100 m backstroke | | | H | F | | |
| 200 m backstroke | | | | | H | F |
| 50 m breaststroke | | | | | H | F |
| 100 m breaststroke | | | H | F | | |
| 200 m breaststroke | H | F | | | | |
| 50 m butterfly | | | H | F | | |
| 100 m butterfly | H | F | | | | |
| 200 m butterfly | | | | | H | F |
| 200 m individual medley | H | F | | | | |
| 400 m individual medley | | | H | F | | |
| 4 × 100 m freestyle relay | | F | | | | |
| 4 × 200 m freestyle relay | | | | F | | |
| 4 × 100 m medley relay | | | | | | F |
| 100 m freestyle S10 | | | | | H | F |

Women
| Date → | Sat 23 | | Sun 24 | | Mon 25 | |
| Event ↓ | M | E | M | E | M | E |
|---|---|---|---|---|---|---|
| 50 m freestyle | | | | | H | F |
| 100 m freestyle | H | F | | | | |
| 200 m freestyle | | | H | F | | |
| 400 m freestyle | | | | | H | F |
| 800 m freestyle | H | H | | | | |
| 50 m backstroke | H | F | | | | |
| 100 m backstroke | | | H | F | | |
| 200 m backstroke | | | | | H | F |
| 50 m breaststroke | | | | | H | F |
| 100 m breaststroke | | | H | F | | |
| 200 m breaststroke | H | F | | | | |
| 50 m butterfly | | | H | F | | |
| 100 m butterfly | H | F | | | | |
| 200 m butterfly | | | | | H | F |
| 200 m individual medley | | | H | F | | |
| 400 m individual medley | H | F | | | | |
| 4 × 100 m freestyle relay | | | | F | | |
| 4 × 200 m freestyle relay | | F | | | | |
| 4 × 100 m medley relay | | | | | | F |
| 100 m freestyle S10 | | | | | | F |

== Medal summary ==
=== Men's events ===
| Event | Gold | | Silver | | Bronze | |
|---|---|---|---|---|---|---|
| 50 m freestyle | Kristian Golomeev; Greece | 21.66; NR | Oussama Sahnoune; Algeria | 21.96; NR | Ali Khalafalla; Egypt | 21.97; NR |
| 100 m freestyle | Oussama Sahnoune; Algeria | 48.00; NR | Alessandro Miressi; Italy | 48.56 | Luca Dotto; Italy | 49.20 |
| 200 m freestyle | Velimir Stjepanović; Serbia | 1:47.13 | Filippo Megli; Italy | 1:48.02 | Marwan Elkamash; Egypt | 1:48.12 |
| 400 m freestyle | Gregorio Paltrinieri; Italy | 3:46.29 | Domenico Acerenza; Italy | 3:47.50 | Marwan Elkamash; Egypt | 3:47.51 |
| 1500 m freestyle | Gregorio Paltrinieri; Italy | 14:46.25 | Domenico Acerenza; Italy | 14:55.44 | Joris Bouchaut; France | 15:08.70 |
| 50 m backstroke | Simone Sabbioni; Italy | 25.11 | Niccolò Bonacchi; Italy | 25.21 | Apostolos Christou; Greece | 25.35 |
| 100 m backstroke | Apostolos Christou; Greece | 54.68 | Simone Sabbioni; Italy | 54.77 | Not awarded | |
| 100 m backstroke | Apostolos Christou; Greece | 54.68 | Christopher Ciccarese; Italy | 54.77 | Not awarded | |
| 200 m backstroke | Christopher Ciccarese; Italy | 1:58.79 | Hugo González; Spain | 1:58.94 | Apostolos Christou; Greece | 2:00.37 |
| 50 m breaststroke | Fabio Scozzoli; Italy | 27.25 | Čaba Silađi; Serbia | 27.31 | Peter John Stevens; Slovenia | 27.32 |
| 100 m breaststroke | Fabio Scozzoli; Italy | 1:00.36; GR | Čaba Silađi; Serbia | 1:00.46 | Berkay Ömer Öğretir; Turkey | 1:00.95 |
| 200 m breaststroke | Luca Pizzini; Italy | 2:09.91 | Joan Ballester; Spain | 2:13.48 | Alex Castejón; Spain | 2:13.91 |
| 50 m butterfly | Kristian Golomeev; Greece | 23.53; NR | Abdelrahman Elaraby; Egypt | 23.69; NR | Piero Codia; Italy | 23.74 |
| 100 m butterfly | Piero Codia; Italy | 52.25 | Matteo Rivolta; Italy | 52.34 | Ümit Can Güreş; Turkey | 52.53 |
| 200 m butterfly | Velimir Stjepanović; Serbia | 1:56.93 | Filippo Berlincioni; Italy | 1:58.01 | Stefanos Dimitriadis; Greece Andreas Vazaios; Greece | 1:58.16 |
| 200 m individual medley | Andreas Vazaios; Greece | 1:59.40 | Hugo González; Spain | 2:00.53 | Alexis Santos; Portugal | 2:00.83 |
| 400 m individual medley | Federico Turrini; Italy | 4:16.37 | Joan Lluís Pons; Spain | 4:17.97 | João Vital; Portugal | 4:18.76 |
| 4 × 100 m freestyle | Serbia (SRB); Velimir Stjepanović (49.04); Uroš Nikolić (48.73); Andrej Barna (48.90); Ivan Lenđer (49.09) | 3:15.76 | Greece (GRE); Apostolos Christou (50.69); Andreas Vazaios (49.37); Fotios Koliopoulos (49.51); Kristian Golomeev (48.68) | 3:18.25 | Turkey (TUR); Hüseyin Emre Sakçı (50.47); İskender Baslakov (50.13); Yalım Acımış (50.26); Kemal Arda Gürdal (49.86) | 3:20.72 |
| 4 × 200 m freestyle | Italy (ITA); Matteo Ciampi (1:48.70); Stefano Di Cola (1:48.08); Filippo Megli (1:46.80); Mattia Zuin (1:48.08) | 7:11.66 | Serbia (SRB); Velimir Stjepanović (1:46.81); Aleksa Bobar (1:50.79); Andrej Barna (1:50.16); Uroš Nikolić (1:50.81) | 7:18.57 | Spain (ESP); Marc Sánchez (1:50.26); Moritz Berg (1:49.10); Hugo González (1:49.92); Miguel Durán (1:51.13) | 7:20.41 |
| 4 × 100 m medley | Greece (GRE); Apostolos Christou (54.56); Ioannis Karpouzlis (1:01.71); Stefanos Dimitriadis (52.34); Kristian Golomeev (48.03) | 3:36.64 | Serbia (SRB); Velimir Stjepanović (55.75); Čaba Silađi (59.92); Ivan Lenđer (52.68); Aleksa Bobar (50.09) | 3:38.44; NR | Turkey (TUR); Ege Başer (57.36); Berkay Öğretir (1:00.29); Ümit Can Güreş (51.94); Kemal Arda Gürdal (49.79) | 3:39.38; NR |

=== Women's events ===
| Event | Gold | | Silver | | Bronze | |
|---|---|---|---|---|---|---|
| 50 m freestyle | Farida Osman; Egypt | 24.83; GR | Lidón Muñoz; Spain | 25.20 =NR | Theodora Drakou; Greece | 25.31 |
| 100 m freestyle | Erika Ferraioli; Italy | 54.91 | Lidón Muñoz; Spain | 55.28 | Neža Klančar; Slovenia | 55.40 |
| 200 m freestyle | Marie Wattel; France | 1:59.12 | Melani Costa; Spain | 1:59.75 | Linda Caponi; Italy | 2:00.02 |
| 400 m freestyle | Simona Quadarella; Italy | 4:05.68 | Mireia Belmonte; Spain | 4:05.87 | Diana Durães; Portugal | 4:09.49; NR |
| 800 m freestyle | Simona Quadarella; Italy | 8:21.44 | Mireia Belmonte; Spain | 8:26.55 | Tjaša Oder; Slovenia | 8:28.91 |
| 50 m backstroke | Silvia Scalia; Italy | 28.33; GR | Duane Da Rocha; Spain | 28.57 | Theodora Drakou; Greece | 28.61 |
| 100 m backstroke | Margherita Panziera; Italy | 1:00.74 | Silvia Scalia; Italy | 1:00.99 | Ekaterina Avramova; Turkey | 1:01.16 |
| 200 m backstroke | Margherita Panziera; Italy | 2:08.08 | África Zamorano; Spain | 2:11.75 | Ekaterina Avramova; Turkey | 2:13.43 |
| 50 m breaststroke | Arianna Castiglioni; Italy | 31.07; GR | Martina Carraro; Italy | 31.33 | Jessica Vall; Spain | 31.49 |
| 100 m breaststroke | Jessica Vall; Spain | 1:07.19; GR | Marina García Urzainqui; Spain | 1:07.58 | Arianna Castiglioni; Italy | 1:07.85 |
| 200 m breaststroke | Jessica Vall; Spain | 2:25.22; GR | Marina García Urzainqui; Spain | 2:25.39 | Viktoriya Zeynep Güneş; Turkey | 2:26.92 |
| 50 m butterfly | Farida Osman; Egypt | 25.48; GR | Elena Di Liddo; Italy | 26.21 | Marie Wattel; France | 26.48 |
| 100 m butterfly | Elena Di Liddo; Italy | 57.59; GR | Farida Osman; Egypt | 58.51 | Anna Ntountounaki; Greece | 58.78 |
| 200 m butterfly | Mireia Belmonte; Spain | 2:07.80 | Ana Monteiro; Portugal | 2:08.06; NR | Alessia Polieri; Italy | 2:08.46 |
| 200 m individual medley | Mireia Belmonte; Spain | 2:11.66 | Viktoriya Zeynep Güneş; Turkey | 2:13.19 | Anna Pirovano; Italy | 2:13.21 |
| 400 m individual medley | Catalina Corró; Spain | 4:39.42; GR | Anja Crevar; Serbia | 4:40.62; NR | Carlotta Toni; Italy | 4:41.43 |
| 4 × 100 m freestyle | Italy (ITA); Giada Galizi (55.57); Laura Letrari (55.13); Paola Biagioli (55.04); Erika Ferraioli (54.21) | 3:39.95; GR | France (FRA); Marie Wattel (54.78); Léna Bousquin (55.63); Alizée Morel (55.76); Assia Touati (55.15) | 3:41.32 | Spain (ESP); Marta González (55.44); Lidón Muñoz (55.13); Marta Cano (56.07); Melani Costa (55.24) | 3:41.88 |
| 4 × 200 m freestyle | Italy (ITA); Margherita Panziera (2:01.02); Linda Caponi (2:00.14); Stefania Pirozzi (2:01.09); Laura Letrari (2:00.38) | 8:02.63 | France (FRA); Alizée Morel (2:02.16); Assia Touati (2:00.09); Camille Gheorghiu (2:01.06); Marie Wattel (1:59.74) | 8:03.05 | Spain (ESP); Melani Costa (2:00.23); África Zamorano (2:00.42); Lidón Muñoz (2:00.71); Marta Cano (2:03.17) | 8:04.53 |
| 4 × 100 m medley | Italy (ITA); Margherita Panziera (1:00.54) GR; Arianna Castiglioni (1:06.14); Elena Di Liddo (57.05); Erika Ferraioli (54.54) | 3:58.27; GR, NR | Spain (ESP); Duane Da Rocha (1:01.31); Jessica Vall (1:07.03); Lidón Muñoz (1:00.17); Marta González (55.82) | 4:04.33 | Greece (GRE); Theodora Drakou (1:01.31); Maria-Thaleia Drasidou (1:11.20); Anna Ntountounaki (57.75); Sofia Klikopoulou (56.82) | 4:08.22 |

=== Paralympic events ===
| Event | Gold | | Silver | | Bronze | |
|---|---|---|---|---|---|---|
| Men's 100 m freestyle S10 | Stefano Raimondi; Italy | 53.38 | David Levecq; Spain | 55.24 | Riccardo Menciotti; Italy | 55.94 |
| Women's 100 m freestyle S10 | Élodie Lorandi; France | 1:01.96 | Alessia Scortechini; Italy | 1:02.38 | Sarai Gascón Moreno; Spain | 1:03.09 |

=== Medal table ===
The host country is highlighted in lavender blue

| Rank | Nation | Gold | Silver | Bronze | Total |
|---|---|---|---|---|---|
| 1 | Italy | 22 | 13 | 8 | 43 |
| 2 | Spain* | 5 | 15 | 6 | 26 |
| 3 | Greece | 5 | 1 | 8 | 14 |
| 4 | Serbia | 3 | 5 | 0 | 8 |
| 5 | Egypt | 2 | 2 | 3 | 7 |
| 6 | France | 2 | 2 | 2 | 6 |
| 7 | Algeria | 1 | 1 | 0 | 2 |
| 8 | Turkey | 0 | 1 | 7 | 8 |
| 9 | Portugal | 0 | 1 | 3 | 4 |
| 10 | Slovenia | 0 | 0 | 3 | 3 |
| Totals (10 entries) | | 40 | 41 | 40 | 121 |
