= Taekwondo at the 2018 Mediterranean Games – Women's 57 kg =

Taekwondo competition

Taekwondo – Women's 57 kg at the 2018 Mediterranean Games
- Venue: Salou Pavilion
- Date: 28 June
- Competitors: 12 from 12 nations

Medalists
gold medal	İrem Yaman	Turkey
silver medal	Radwa Elsayed Nada	Egypt
bronze medal	Marta Calvo	Spain
bronze medal	Nikita Glasnović	Croatia

The women's 57 kg competition of the taekwondo events at the 2018 Mediterranean Games took place on the 28 of June at the Salou Pavilion.

== Schedule ==
All times are Central European Summer Time (UTC+2).

Date	Time	Round
June 28, 2018	10:45	Preliminaries
June 28, 2018	16:00	Finals

== Results ==
Legend

- PTG — Won by Points Gap
- SUP — Won by superiority
- OT — Won on over time (Golden Point)
- DQ — Won by disqualification
- PUN — Won by punitive declaration
- WD — Won by withdrawal

=== Main bracket ===
Preliminary round
9	Nada Laaraj (MAR)	10
8	Aleksandra Radmilović (SRB)	12 (OT)
5	Joana Cunha (POR)	12
12	Laetitia Aoun (LBN)	7
11	Konstantina Tzeli (GRE)	3
6	Rahma Ben Ali (TUN)	1
7	Despina Pilavaki (CYP)	0
10	Laurygan Celin (FRA)	16

Quarter-finals
1	Nikita Glasnović (CRO)	19
8	Aleksandra Radmilović (SRB)	8
5	Joana Cunha (POR)	5
4	Radwa Elsayed Nada (EGY)	6
3	Marta Calvo (ESP)	14
11	Konstantina Tzeli (GRE)	6
10	Laurygan Celin (FRA)	4
2	İrem Yaman (TUR)	16

Semi-finals
1	Nikita Glasnović (CRO)	13
4	Radwa Elsayed Nada (EGY)	16
3	Marta Calvo (ESP)	3
2	İrem Yaman (TUR)	7

Gold medal match
4	Radwa Elsayed Nada (EGY)	0
2	İrem Yaman (TUR)	8
