= Taekwondo at the 2018 Mediterranean Games – Men's 58 kg =

Taekwondo competition

Taekwondo – Men's 58 kg at the 2018 Mediterranean Games
- Venue: Salou Pavilion
- Date: 29 June
- Competitors: 12 from 12 nations

Medalists
gold medal	Jesús Tortosa	Spain
silver medal	Rui Bragança	Portugal
bronze medal	Hedi Neffati	Tunisia
bronze medal	Miloš Gladović	Serbia

The men's 58 kg competition of the taekwondo events at the 2018 Mediterranean Games took place on the 29 of June at the Salou Pavilion.

== Schedule ==
All times are Central European Summer Time (UTC+2).

Date	Time	Round
June 29, 2018	10:00	Preliminaries
June 29, 2018	16:00	Finals

== Results ==
Legend

- PTG — Won by Points Gap
- SUP — Won by superiority
- OT — Won on over time (Golden Point)
- DQ — Won by disqualification
- PUN — Won by punitive declaration
- WD — Won by withdrawal

=== Main bracket ===
Preliminary round
8	Mohamed Farag (EGY)	18
9	Yousef Shriha (LBA)	16
5	Eleftherios Fakinos (GRE)	24 (PTG)
12	Elord Gjana (ALB)	3
6	Miloš Gladović (SRB)	27
11	Kyliann Bonnet (FRA)	12
7	Deniz Dagdelen (TUR)	21 (OT)
10	Amine Elhamrazi (MAR)	18

Quarter-finals
1	Jesús Tortosa (ESP)	10 (DSQ)
8	Mohamed Farag (EGY)	1
5	Eleftherios Fakinos (GRE)	6
4	Hedi Neffati (TUN)	14
3	Vito Dell'Aquila (ITA)	23
6	Miloš Gladović (SRB)	25 (PUN)
7	Deniz Dagdelen (TUR)	17
2	Rui Bragança (POR)	26

Semi-finals
1	Jesús Tortosa (ESP)	18
4	Hedi Neffati (TUN)	16
6	Miloš Gladović (SRB)	8
2	Rui Bragança (POR)	10 (OT)

Gold medal match
1	Jesús Tortosa (ESP)	15
2	Rui Bragança (POR)	2
