= Taekwondo at the 2018 Mediterranean Games – Men's +80 kg =

Taekwondo competition

Taekwondo – Men's +80 kg at the 2018 Mediterranean Games
- Venue: Salou Pavilion
- Date: 28 June
- Competitors: 10 from 10 nations

Medalists
gold medal	Daniel Ros Gómez	Spain
silver medal	Dejan Georgievski	Macedonia
bronze medal	Emre Kutalmış Ateşli	Turkey
bronze medal	Yoann Miangue	France

The men's +80 kg competition of the taekwondo events at the 2018 Mediterranean Games took place on the 28 of June at the Salou Pavilion.

== Schedule ==
All times are Central European Summer Time (UTC+2).

Date	Time	Round
June 28, 2018	10:30	Preliminaries
June 28, 2018	16:30	Finals

== Results ==
Legend

- PTG — Won by Points Gap
- SUP — Won by superiority
- OT — Won on over time (Golden Point)
- DQ — Won by disqualification
- PUN — Won by punitive declaration
- WD — Won by withdrawal

=== Main bracket ===
Preliminary round
8	Matteo Milani (ITA)	13
7	Dejan Giorgievski (MKD)	24
6	Ayoub Bassel (MAR)	16
9	Athanasios Nikolaidis (GRE)	13

Quarter-finals
1	Ivan Trajkovič (SLO)	28
7	Dejan Giorgievski (MKD)	30 (OT)
5	Yoann Miangue (FRA)	6
4	Draško Jovanov (SRB)	5
3	Emre Kutalmış Ateşli (TUR)	13
6	Mohamed Abdelmawgood (EGY)	10
6	Ayoub Bassel (MAR)	11
2	Daniel Ros Gómez (ESP)	16

Semi-finals
7	Dejan Giorgievski (MKD)	19
5	Yoann Miangue (FRA)	18
3	Emre Kutalmış Ateşli (TUR)	13
2	Daniel Ros Gómez (ESP)	19

Gold medal match
7	Dejan Giorgievski (MKD)	9
2	Daniel Ros Gómez (ESP)	24
