= Boxing at the 2018 Mediterranean Games – Men's flyweight =

Boxing competitions

Men's flyweight boxing at the 2018 Mediterranean Games
- Venue: Torredembarra Pavilion
- Date: 25–30 June 2018
- Competitors: 10 from 10 nations

Medalists
gold medal	Gabriel Escobar	Spain
silver medal	Hussin Al Masri	Syria
bronze medal	Dušan Janjić	Serbia
bronze medal	Manuel Cappai	Italy

The men's flyweight competition of the boxing events at the 2018 Mediterranean Games in Tarragona, Spain, was held between June 25 and 30 at the Torredembarra Pavilion.

Like all Mediterranean Games boxing events, the competition was a straight single-elimination tournament. Both semifinal losers were awarded bronze medals, so no boxers competed again after their first loss.

== Schedule ==
All times are Central European Summer Time (UTC+2).

Date	Time	Round
June 25, 2018	16:23 & 16:39	Round of 16
June 27, 2018	16:00 & 16:45	Quarterfinals
June 29, 2018	18:30	Semifinals
June 30, 2018	16:00	Final

== Results ==
=== Bracket ===
Round of 16
Billal Bennama (FRA)	0
Yassine Bendadda (MAR)	3
Abdelrahman Aly (EGY)	5
Ardit Murja (ALB)	0

Quarterfinals
Hussin Al Masri (SYR)	3
Yassine Bendadda (MAR)	2
Oussama Mordjane (ALG)	1
Manuel Cappai (ITA)	4
Gabriel Escobar (ESP)	5
Batuhan Ciftci (TUR)	0
Abdelrahman Aly (EGY)	1
Dušan Janjić (SRB)	3

Semifinals
Hussin Al Masri (SYR)	4
Manuel Cappai (ITA)	1
Gabriel Escobar (ESP)	5
Dušan Janjić (SRB)	0

Final
Hussin Al Masri (SYR)	0
Gabriel Escobar (ESP)	5
