= Taekwondo at the 2018 Mediterranean Games =

Taekwondo competition

- Venue: Salou Pavilion
- Dates: 28–30 June
- Competitors: 107 from 22 nations

The taekwondo competitions at the 2018 Mediterranean Games took place between 28 June and 30 June at the Salou Pavilion in Salou.

Athletes competed in 8 weight categories.

== Medal summary ==
=== Men's events ===
Event	Gold	Silver	Bronze
Flyweight (58 kg)	Jesús Tortosa; Spain	Rui Bragança; Portugal	Hedi Neffati; Tunisia
Flyweight (58 kg)	Jesús Tortosa; Spain	Rui Bragança; Portugal	Miloš Gladović; Serbia
Lightweight (68 kg)	Javier Pérez Polo; Spain	Konstantinos Chamalidis; Greece	Davide Spinosa; Italy
Lightweight (68 kg)	Javier Pérez Polo; Spain	Konstantinos Chamalidis; Greece	Hakan Reçber; Turkey
Middleweight (80 kg)	Raúl Martínez García; Spain	Seif Eissa; Egypt	Júlio Ferreira; Portugal
Middleweight (80 kg)	Raúl Martínez García; Spain	Seif Eissa; Egypt	Yunus Sarı; Turkey
Heavyweight (+80 kg)	Daniel Ros; Spain	Dejan Georgievski; Macedonia	Yoann Miangue; France
Heavyweight (+80 kg)	Daniel Ros; Spain	Dejan Georgievski; Macedonia	Emre Kutalmış Ateşli; Turkey

=== Women's events ===
Event	Gold	Silver	Bronze
Flyweight (49 kg)	Rukiye Yıldırım; Turkey	Kristina Tomić; Croatia	Oumaima El Bouchti; Morocco
Flyweight (49 kg)	Rukiye Yıldırım; Turkey	Kristina Tomić; Croatia	Vanja Stanković; Serbia
Lightweight (57 kg)	İrem Yaman; Turkey	Radwa Elsayed Nada; Egypt	Marta Calvo; Spain
Lightweight (57 kg)	İrem Yaman; Turkey	Radwa Elsayed Nada; Egypt	Nikita Glasnović; Croatia
Middleweight (67 kg)	Matea Jelić; Croatia	Althéa Laurin; France	Dunja Lemajić; Slovenia
Middleweight (67 kg)	Matea Jelić; Croatia	Althéa Laurin; France	Hedaya Malak; Egypt
Heavyweight (+67 kg)	Ana Bajić; Serbia	Marie-Paule Blé; France	Nafia Kuş; Turkey
Heavyweight (+67 kg)	Ana Bajić; Serbia	Marie-Paule Blé; France	Wiam Dislam; Morocco

=== Medal table ===
* Host nation (Spain)

Rank	Nation	Gold	Silver	Bronze	Total
1	Spain*	4	0	1	5
2	Turkey	2	0	4	6
3	Croatia	1	1	1	3
4	Serbia	1	0	2	3
5	Egypt	0	2	1	3
5	France	0	2	1	3
7	Portugal	0	1	1	2
8	Greece	0	1	0	1
8	Macedonia	0	1	0	1
10	Morocco	0	0	2	2
11	Italy	0	0	1	1
11	Slovenia	0	0	1	1
11	Tunisia	0	0	1	1
Totals (13 entries)		8	8	16	32
