= Boxing at the 2018 Mediterranean Games =

Boxing competition

- Venue: Torredembarra Pavilion
- Dates: 25–30 June
- Competitors: 98

The boxing competitions at the 2018 Mediterranean Games took place between 25 and 30 June at the Torredembarra Pavilion in Torredembarra.

Athletes competed in 9 weight categories. Only men's boxing was held.

== Medal table ==
Rank	Nation	Gold	Silver	Bronze	Total
1	Egypt	3	0	0	3
2	Italy	2	1	1	4
3	Turkey	1	2	3	6
4	Spain*	1	1	1	3
4	Syria	1	1	1	3
6	France	1	0	3	4
7	Morocco	0	2	0	2
8	Albania	0	1	0	1
8	Croatia	0	1	0	1
10	Tunisia	0	0	3	3
11	Algeria	0	0	2	2
11	Greece	0	0	2	2
11	Serbia	0	0	2	2
Totals (13 entries)		9	9	18	36

== Medalists ==
Event	Gold	Silver	Bronze
Flyweight (52kg)	Gabriel Escobar; Spain	Hussin Al Masri; Syria	Manuel Cappai; Italy
Flyweight (52kg)	Gabriel Escobar; Spain	Hussin Al Masri; Syria	Dušan Janjić; Serbia
Bantamweight (56kg)	Raffaele Di Serio; Italy	Krenar Zeneli; Albania	Bilel Mhamdi; Tunisia
Bantamweight (56kg)	Raffaele Di Serio; Italy	Krenar Zeneli; Albania	Ali İhsan Alagaş; Turkey
Lightweight (60kg)	Sofiane Oumiha; France	Hakan Dogan; Turkey	Alaa Shili; Tunisia
Lightweight (60kg)	Sofiane Oumiha; France	Hakan Dogan; Turkey	Reda Benbaziz; Algeria
Light welterweight (64kg)	Tuğrulhan Erdemir; Turkey	Abdelhaq Nadir; Morocco	Johan Orozco; Spain
Light welterweight (64kg)	Tuğrulhan Erdemir; Turkey	Abdelhaq Nadir; Morocco	Alexandros Tsanikidis; Greece
Welterweight (69kg)	Walid Sedik Mohamed; Egypt	Youba Sissokho; Spain	Ahmed Tabai; Tunisia
Welterweight (69kg)	Walid Sedik Mohamed; Egypt	Youba Sissokho; Spain	Onur Şipal; Turkey
Middleweight (75kg)	Ahmad Ghosoun; Syria	Salvatore Cavallaro; Italy	Trifun Dašić; Serbia
Middleweight (75kg)	Ahmad Ghosoun; Syria	Salvatore Cavallaro; Italy	Bengoro Bamba; France
Light heavyweight (81kg)	Abdelrahman Abdelgawad; Egypt	Bayram Malkan; Turkey	Polyneikis Kalamaras; Greece
Light heavyweight (81kg)	Abdelrahman Abdelgawad; Egypt	Bayram Malkan; Turkey	Mohammed Houmri; Algeria
Heavyweight (91kg)	Aziz Abbes Mouhiidine; Italy	Toni Filipi; Croatia	Burak Aksın; Turkey
Heavyweight (91kg)	Aziz Abbes Mouhiidine; Italy	Toni Filipi; Croatia	Paul Omba-Biongolo; France
Super heavyweight (+91kg)	Yousry Hafez; Egypt	Mohamed Firisse; Morocco	Djamili-Dini Aboudou; France
Super heavyweight (+91kg)	Yousry Hafez; Egypt	Mohamed Firisse; Morocco	Mohamad Mulayes; Syria
