= Cycling at the 2018 Mediterranean Games – Men's road time trial =

Men's road time trial at the 2018 Mediterranean Games
- Venue: Vila-seca Urban Circuit; 25 km (15.5 mi)
- Date: 30 June
- Competitors: 21 from 12 nations
- Winning time: 30:31

Medalists
gold medal	Edoardo Affini	Italy
silver medal	Domingos Gonçalves	Portugal
bronze medal	Izidor Penko	Slovenia

The men's individual time trial was one of 4 cycling events of the 2018 Mediterranean Games. The event started and finished on 30 June at the Vila-seca Urban Circuit.

== Results ==
Pos.	No.	Rider	Country	Time	Diff
1st place, gold medalist(s)	12	Edoardo Affini	Italy	30:31.12	
2nd place, silver medalist(s)	16	Domingos Gonçalves	Portugal	30:37.02	+0:06
3rd place, bronze medalist(s)	21	Izidor Penko	Slovenia	30:53.66	+0:22
4	2	Paolo Baccio	Italy	30:59.80	+0:28
5	14	Ahmet Örken	Turkey	31:14.47	+0:43
6	22	Veljko Stojnić	Serbia	31:16.69	+0:45
7	13	Mario González	Spain	31:34.76	+0:45
8	11	Polychronis Tzortzakis	Greece	31:46.81	+1:03
9	3	Álvaro Trueba	Spain	31:50.67	+1:15
10	9	Jaka Primožič	Slovenia	32:03.50	+1:19
11	10	Dušan Rajović	Serbia	32:09.63	+1:32
12	15	Andreas Miltiadis	Cyprus	32:26.79	+1:38
13	17	Abderahmane Mansouri	Algeria	32:55.73	+2:24
14	18	David Jabuka	Croatia	33:08.37	+2:37
15	1	Charalampos Kastrantas	Greece	33:25.13	+2:54
16	20	Ahmad Badreddin Wais	Syria	33:26.44	+2:55
17	4	Feritcan Şamlı	Turkey	33:30.28	+2:59
18	5	Alexandros Agrotis	Cyprus	33:44.16	+3:13
19	19	Oscar Cabanas	Andorra	33:46.77	+3:15
20	7	Samuel Ponce	Andorra	35:04.19	+4:33
	8	Mohammed Nwiser	Syria	Did not finish	
	6	Islam Mansouri	Algeria	Did not start	
