= Boxing at the 2018 Mediterranean Games – Men's heavyweight =

Boxing competitions

Men's heavyweight boxing at the 2018 Mediterranean Games
- Venue: Torredembarra Pavilion
- Date: 27–30 June 2018
- Competitors: 8 from 8 nations

Medalists
gold medal	Aziz Abbes Mouhiidine	Italy
silver medal	Toni Filipi	Croatia
bronze medal	Burak Aksın	Turkey
bronze medal	Paul Omba-Biongolo	France

The men's heavyweight competition of the boxing events at the 2018 Mediterranean Games in Tarragona, Spain, was held between June 27 and 30 at the Torredembarra Pavilion.

Like all Mediterranean Games boxing events, the competition was a straight single-elimination tournament. Both semifinal losers were awarded bronze medals, so no boxers competed again after their first loss.

== Schedule ==
All times are Central European Summer Time (UTC+2).

Date	Time	Round
June 27, 2018	19:30	Quarterfinals
June 29, 2018	17:30	Semifinals
June 30, 2018	17:45	Final

== Results ==
=== Bracket ===
Quarterfinals
Toni Filipi (CRO)	RSC
Marko Docić (SRB)
Ahmed Ibrahim Ahmed (EGY)	0
Paul Omba-Biongolo (FRA)	5
Aziz Abbes Mouhiidine (ITA)	3
Alaa Eldin Ghossoun (SYR)	2
Elvir Sendro (BIH)	2
Burak Aksın (TUR)	3

Semifinals
Toni Filipi (CRO)
Paul Omba-Biongolo (FRA)	ABD
Aziz Abbes Mouhiidine (ITA)	5
Burak Aksın (TUR)	0

Finals
Toni Filipi (CRO)	0
Aziz Abbes Mouhiidine (ITA)	5
