= Judo at the 2018 Mediterranean Games =

Judo competition

- Venue: Cambrils Pavilion
- Dates: 27–29 June

The judo competitions at the 2018 Mediterranean Games took place between 27 and 29 June at the Cambrils Pavilion in Cambrils.

Athletes competed in 14 weight categories.

== Medal table ==
* Host nation (Spain)

Rank	Nation	Gold	Silver	Bronze	Total
1	Spain*	4	1	1	6
2	Italy	3	5	3	11
3	Kosovo	3	1	0	4
4	Tunisia	1	3	2	6
5	Serbia	1	2	0	3
6	Turkey	1	1	4	6
7	Egypt	1	1	1	3
8	France	0	0	6	6
9	Slovenia	0	0	4	4
10	Algeria	0	0	2	2
10	Greece	0	0	2	2
10	Portugal	0	0	2	2
13	Morocco	0	0	1	1
Totals (13 entries)		14	14	28	56

== Medalists ==
=== Men ===
Event	Gold	Silver	Bronze
Extra-lightweight; 60 kg	Francisco Garrigós; Spain	Fraj Dhouibi; Tunisia	Bekir Özlü; Turkey
Extra-lightweight; 60 kg	Francisco Garrigós; Spain	Fraj Dhouibi; Tunisia	David Štarkel; Slovenia
Half-lightweight; 66 kg	Manuel Lombardo; Italy	Alberto Gaitero; Spain	Andraž Jereb; Slovenia
Half-lightweight; 66 kg	Manuel Lombardo; Italy	Alberto Gaitero; Spain	Imad Bassou; Morocco
Lightweight; 73 kg	Akil Gjakova; Kosovo	Bilal Çiloğlu; Turkey	Mohamed Mohyeldin; Egypt
Lightweight; 73 kg	Akil Gjakova; Kosovo	Bilal Çiloğlu; Turkey	Fabio Basile; Italy
Half-middleweight; 81 kg	Abdelaziz Ben Ammar; Tunisia	Mohamed Abdelaal; Egypt	Alexios Ntanatsidis; Greece
Half-middleweight; 81 kg	Abdelaziz Ben Ammar; Tunisia	Mohamed Abdelaal; Egypt	Anri Egutidze; Portugal
Middleweight; 90 kg	Nikoloz Sherazadishvili; Spain	Nemanja Majdov; Serbia	Theodoros Tselidis; Greece
Middleweight; 90 kg	Nikoloz Sherazadishvili; Spain	Nemanja Majdov; Serbia	Nicholas Mungai; Italy
Half-heavyweight; 100 kg	Ramadan Darwish; Egypt	Giuliano Loporchio; Italy	Lyès Bouyacoub; Algeria
Half-heavyweight; 100 kg	Ramadan Darwish; Egypt	Giuliano Loporchio; Italy	Alexandre Iddir; France
Heavyweight +100 kg	Žarko Ćulum; Serbia	Vincenzo D'Arco; Italy	Ángel Parra; Spain
Heavyweight +100 kg	Žarko Ćulum; Serbia	Vincenzo D'Arco; Italy	Faicel Jaballah; Tunisia

=== Women ===
Event	Gold	Silver	Bronze
Extra-lightweight; 48 kg	Julia Figueroa; Spain	Milica Nikolić; Serbia	Francesca Milani; Italy
Extra-lightweight; 48 kg	Julia Figueroa; Spain	Milica Nikolić; Serbia	Maruša Štangar; Slovenia
Half-lightweight; 52 kg	Distria Krasniqi; Kosovo	Odette Giuffrida; Italy	Astride Gneto; France
Half-lightweight; 52 kg	Distria Krasniqi; Kosovo	Odette Giuffrida; Italy	İrem Korkmaz; Turkey
Lightweight; 57 kg	Nora Gjakova; Kosovo	Miriam Boi; Italy	Priscilla Gneto; France
Lightweight; 57 kg	Nora Gjakova; Kosovo	Miriam Boi; Italy	Ghofran Khelifi; Tunisia
Half-middleweight; 63 kg	Edwige Gwend; Italy	Meriem Bjaoui; Tunisia	Manon Deketer; France
Half-middleweight; 63 kg	Edwige Gwend; Italy	Meriem Bjaoui; Tunisia	Büşra Katipoğlu; Turkey
Middleweight; 70 kg	María Bernabéu; Spain	Carola Paissoni; Italy	Margaux Pinot; France
Middleweight; 70 kg	María Bernabéu; Spain	Carola Paissoni; Italy	Nurcan Yılmaz; Turkey
Half-heavyweight; 78 kg	Giorgia Stangherlin; Italy	Loriana Kuka; Kosovo	Patrícia Sampaio; Portugal
Half-heavyweight; 78 kg	Giorgia Stangherlin; Italy	Loriana Kuka; Kosovo	Patricija Brolih; Slovenia
Heavyweight +78 kg	Kayra Sayit; Turkey	Nihel Cheikh Rouhou; Tunisia	Sonia Asselah; Algeria
Heavyweight +78 kg	Kayra Sayit; Turkey	Nihel Cheikh Rouhou; Tunisia	Julia Tolofua; France
