= Gymnastics at the 2018 Mediterranean Games – Women's artistic individual all-around =

Women's artistic individual all-around at the 2018 Mediterranean Games
- Venue: Reus Olimpic Pavilion
- Date: 25 June 2018
- Competitors: 16
- Winning total: 53.200

Medalists
gold medal	(Italy) Lara Mori
silver medal	(France) Louise Vanhille
bronze medal	(Spain) Ana Pérez

The Women's artistic individual all-around competition at the 2018 Mediterranean Games was held on 25 June 2018 at the Reus Olimpic Pavilion.

== Final ==
Position	Gymnast	Vault (gymnastics)	Uneven bars	Balance beam	Floor (gymnastics)	Total
1st place, gold medalist(s)	Lara Mori (ITA)	13.550	12.800	13.800	13.050	53.200
2nd place, silver medalist(s)	Louise Vanhille (FRA)	13.750	13.000	12.500	12.800	52.050
3rd place, bronze medalist(s)	Ana Pérez (ESP)	13.600	12.700	13.300	11.850	51.450
4	Giada Grisetti (ITA)	13.600	12.200	13.050	12.500	51.350
5	Farah Hussein (EGY)	13.150	12.650	13.450	11.950	51.200
6	Sheyen Petit (FRA)	13.300	12.100	12.700	12.500	50.600
7	Lucija Hribar (SLO)	13.600	12.550	12.350	11.950	50.450
8	Farah Salem (EGY)	12.800	11.850	12.950	11.900	49.500
9	Helena Bonilla (ESP)	13.400	11.350	12.700	12.000	49.450
10	Tutya Yılmaz (TUR)	13.600	12.350	11.200	12.250	49.400
11	Ioanna Xoulogi (GRE)	12.100	11.000	12.600	11.950	47.650
12	Göksu Üçtaş Şanlı (TUR)	14.050	10.000	10.600	12.900	47.550
13	Beatriz Dias (POR)	13.350	11.000	11.550	11.650	47.550
14	Mariana Carvalho (POR)	12.950	10.450	11.750	11.450	46.600
15	(Cyprus) Gloria Philassides (CYP)	12.400	9.600	9.500	10.250	41.750
16	(Cyprus) Anastasia Theocharous (CYP)	12.400	6.400	9.550	11.800	40.150
