= Canoeing at the 2018 Mediterranean Games =

- Venue: Canal Olímpic de Catalunya
- Dates: 23–24 June

The canoeing competitions at the 2018 Mediterranean Games took place on 23 and 24 June at the Canal Olímpic de Catalunya in Castelldefels.

Athletes competed in 5 sprint kayak events.

== Medal summary ==
=== Men's events ===
Event	Gold	Silver	Bronze
K-1 200m	Carlos Garrote; Spain	Marko Dragosavljević; Serbia	Maxime Beaumont; France
K-1 500m	Roi Rodríguez; Spain	Fernando Pimenta; Portugal	Guillaume Burger; France
K-2 500m	Spain (ESP); Marcus Walz; Rodrigo Germade	France (FRA); Franck Le Moël; Guillaume Le Floch Decorchemont	Serbia (SRB); Ervin Holpert; Vladimir Torubarov

=== Women's events ===
Event	Gold	Silver	Bronze
K-1 200m	Teresa Portela; Spain	Sarah Guyot; France	Teresa Portela; Portugal
K-1 500m	Milica Starović; Serbia	Joana Vasconcelos; Portugal	Anja Osterman; Slovenia

=== Medal table ===
* Host nation (Spain)

Rank	Nation	Gold	Silver	Bronze	Total
1	Spain*	4	0	0	4
2	Serbia	1	1	1	3
3	France	0	2	2	4
4	Portugal	0	2	1	3
5	Slovenia	0	0	1	1
Totals (5 entries)		5	5	5	15
