= Swimming at the 2018 Mediterranean Games – Men's 200 metre freestyle =

200 metre freestyle Swimming Competition

Men's 200 metre freestyle at the 2018 Mediterranean Games
- Venue: Campclar Aquatic Center
- Location: Tarragona, Spain
- Dates: 23 June
- Competitors: 23 from 14 nations
- Winning time: 1:47.13

Medalists
gold medal	Velimir Stjepanović	Serbia
silver medal	Filippo Megli	Italy
bronze medal	Marwan Elkamash	Egypt

The men's 200 metre freestyle competition at the 2018 Mediterranean Games was held on 23 June 2018 at the Campclar Aquatic Center.

== Records ==
Prior to this competition, the existing world and Mediterranean Games records were as follows:

World record	Paul Biedermann (GER)	1:42.00	Rome, Italy	28 July 2009
Mediterranean Games record	Oussama Mellouli (TUN)	1:46.44	Pescara, Italy	30 June 2009

== Results ==
=== Heats ===
The heats were held at 09:41.

Rank	Heat	Lane	Name	Nationality	Time	Notes
1	2	4	Filippo Megli	Italy	1:49.38	Q
2	2	5	Mohamed Agili	Tunisia	1:49.67	Q
3	3	4	Velimir Stjepanović	Serbia	1:49.91	Q
4	1	4	Marwan Elkamash	Egypt	1:49.93	Q
5	1	3	Miguel Nascimento	Portugal	1:50.11	Q
6	1	5	Stefano Di Cola	Italy	1:50.40	Q
7	3	5	Jonathan Atsu	France	1:50.69	Q
8	3	2	Erge Can Gezmiş	Turkey	1:50.73	Q
9	2	3	Marc Sánchez	Spain	1:50.81	
10	1	2	Dimitrios Negris	Greece	1:50.89	
11	3	3	Dimitrios Dimitriou	Greece	1:50.91	
12	1	6	Aleksa Bobar	Serbia	1:51.24	
13	3	6	Martin Bau	Slovenia	1:51.28	
14	2	2	Doğa Çelik	Turkey	1:52.26	
15	2	6	Miguel Durán	Spain	1:52.67	
16	2	1	João Vital	Portugal	1:54.56	
17	1	7	Marko Kovačić	Bosnia and Herzegovina	1:54.80	
18	3	7	Omar Eltonbary	Egypt	1:55.59	
19	3	1	Sebastian Konnaris	Cyprus	1:56.67	
20	2	7	Constantinos Hadjittooulis	Cyprus	1:57.18	
21	3	8	Franci Aleksi	Albania	2:01.33	
22	2	8	Dion Kadriu	Kosovo	2:04.43	
23	1	1	Dren Ukimeraj	Kosovo	2:05.28	
	1	8	Audai Hassouna	Libya	DNS	

=== Final ===
The final was held at 17:41.

Rank	Lane	Name	Nationality	Time	Notes
1st place, gold medalist(s)	3	Velimir Stjepanović	Serbia	1:47.13	
2nd place, silver medalist(s)	4	Filippo Megli	Italy	1:48.02	
3rd place, bronze medalist(s)	6	Marwan Elkamash	Egypt	1:48.12	
4	5	Mohamed Agili	Tunisia	1:48.73	
5	7	Stefano Di Cola	Italy	1:49.53	
6	1	Jonathan Atsu	France	1:50.26	
7	8	Erge Can Gezmiş	Turkey	1:50.80	
8	2	Miguel Nascimento	Portugal	1:51.47	
