= Swimming at the 2018 Mediterranean Games – Men's 400 metre individual medley =

Men's 400 metre individual medley at the 2018 Mediterranean Games
- Venue: Campclar Aquatic Center
- Location: Tarragona, Spain
- Dates: 24 June
- Competitors: 12 from 7 nations
- Winning time: 4:16.37

Medalists
gold medal	Federico Turrini	Italy
silver medal	Joan Lluís Pons	Spain
bronze medal	João Vital	Portugal

The men's 400 metre individual medley competition at the 2018 Mediterranean Games was held on 24 June 2018 at the Campclar Aquatic Center.

== Records ==
Prior to this competition, the existing world and Mediterranean Games records were as follows:

World record	Michael Phelps (USA)	4:03.84	Beijing, China	10 August 2008
Mediterranean Games record	Oussama Mellouli (TUN)	4:10.53	Pescara, Italy	29 June 2009

== Results ==
=== Heats ===
The heats were held at 09:30.

Rank	Heat	Lane	Name	Nationality	Time	Notes
1	1	4	Joan Lluís Pons	Spain	4:21.32	Q
2	1	5	João Vital	Portugal	4:21.59	Q
3	2	4	Federico Turrini	Italy	4:23.83	Q
4	2	5	Pier Andrea Matteazzi	Italy	4:24.30	Q
5	2	3	Samy Helmbacher	France	4:27.92	Q
6	2	2	Samet Alkan	Turkey	4:28.54	Q
7	2	3	Tomás Veloso	Portugal	4:28.97	Q
8	1	6	Guillaume Laure	France	4:29.76	Q
9	1	2	Alpkan Örnek	Turkey	4:29.78	
10	2	7	Ramzi Chouchar	Algeria	4:31.02	
11	1	7	Mohamed Masmoudi	Tunisia	4:31.23	
	1	3	Francisco Javier Chacón	Spain	DSQ	

=== Final ===
The final was held at 17:30.

Rank	Lane	Name	Nationality	Time	Notes
1st place, gold medalist(s)	3	Federico Turrini	Italy	4:16.37	
2nd place, silver medalist(s)	4	Joan Lluís Pons	Spain	4:17.97	
3rd place, bronze medalist(s)	5	João Vital	Portugal	4:18.76	
4	6	Pier Andrea Matteazzi	Italy	4:20.01	
5	2	Samy Helmbacher	France	4:25.96	
6	7	Samet Alkan	Turkey	4:26.86	
7	8	Guillaume Laure	France	4:27.26	
8	1	Tomás Veloso	Portugal	4:30.85	
