= Water skiing at the 2018 Mediterranean Games =

- Venue: Marina Port Tarraco
- Dates: 23–24 June

The water skiing competition at the 2018 Mediterranean Games in Tarragona took place on 23 and 24 June at Marina Port Tarraco.

== Medal summary ==
=== Events ===
Event	Gold	Silver	Bronze
Men's slalom	Brando Caruso; Italy	Carlo Allais; Italy	Tanguy Dailland; France
Women's slalom	Camille Poulain-Ferarios; France	Manon Costard; France	Laura Martin; France

=== Medal table ===
Rank	Nation	Gold	Silver	Bronze	Total
1	France	1	1	2	4
2	Italy	1	1	0	2
Totals (2 entries)		2	2	2	6
