= Wrestling at the 2018 Mediterranean Games =

Wrestling competition

- Venue: Vila-seca Pavilion
- Dates: 24–27 June

The wrestling competition at the 2018 Mediterranean Games was held from 24 to 27 June at the Vila-seca Pavilion in Vila-seca.

== Medal table ==
* Host nation (Spain)

| Rank | Nation | Gold | Silver | Bronze | Total |
|---|---|---|---|---|---|
| 1 | Turkey | 8 | 2 | 3 | 13 |
| 2 | France | 2 | 2 | 4 | 8 |
| 3 | Italy | 1 | 3 | 1 | 5 |
| 4 | Egypt | 1 | 2 | 3 | 6 |
| 5 | Greece | 1 | 0 | 1 | 2 |
| 5 | Macedonia | 1 | 0 | 1 | 2 |
| 7 | Algeria | 0 | 2 | 0 | 2 |
| 8 | Serbia | 0 | 1 | 3 | 4 |
| 9 | Slovenia | 0 | 1 | 0 | 1 |
| 9 | Tunisia | 0 | 1 | 0 | 1 |
| 11 | Spain* | 0 | 0 | 3 | 3 |
| 12 | Croatia | 0 | 0 | 2 | 2 |
| 13 | Syria | 0 | 0 | 1 | 1 |
| Totals (13 entries) | | 14 | 14 | 22 | 50 |

== Medalists ==
=== Men's freestyle ===
| Event | Gold | Silver | Bronze |
|---|---|---|---|
| 65 kg | Selahattin Kılıçsallayan; Turkey | David Habat; Slovenia | Stevan Mićić; Serbia |
| 65 kg | Selahattin Kılıçsallayan; Turkey | David Habat; Slovenia | Ilman Mukhtarov; France |
| 74 kg | Frank Chamizo; Italy | Samy Moustafa; Egypt | Dejan Mitrov; Macedonia |
| 74 kg | Frank Chamizo; Italy | Samy Moustafa; Egypt | Muhammet Demir; Turkey |
| 86 kg | Ahmet Bilici; Turkey | Akhmed Aibuev; France | Taimuraz Friev; Spain |
| 97 kg | Magomedgadzhi Nurov; Macedonia | Simone Iannattoni; Italy | Hosam Merghany; Egypt |
| 97 kg | Magomedgadzhi Nurov; Macedonia | Simone Iannattoni; Italy | Yunus Emre Dede; Turkey |

=== Men's Greco-Roman ===
| Event | Gold | Silver | Bronze |
|---|---|---|---|
| 60 kg | Haithem Mahmoud; Egypt | Ali Elçin; Turkey | Ivan Lizatović; Croatia |
| 60 kg | Haithem Mahmoud; Egypt | Ali Elçin; Turkey | Léo Tudezca; France |
| 67 kg | Yasin Özay; France | Mohamed Ibrahim; Egypt | Murat Fırat; Turkey |
| 67 kg | Yasin Özay; France | Mohamed Ibrahim; Egypt | Abdulkarim Al-Hasan; Syria |
| 77 kg | Yunus Emre Başar; Turkey | Davor Štefanek; Serbia | Artak Margaryan; France |
| 77 kg | Yunus Emre Başar; Turkey | Davor Štefanek; Serbia | Božo Starčević; Croatia |
| 87 kg | Metehan Başar; Turkey | Bachir Sid Azara; Algeria | Vladimir Stankić; Serbia |
| 87 kg | Metehan Başar; Turkey | Bachir Sid Azara; Algeria | Dimitrios Tsekeridis; Greece |
| 97 kg | Mélonin Noumonvi; France | Adem Boudjemline; Algeria | Ahmed Hassan Aly; Egypt |
| 97 kg | Mélonin Noumonvi; France | Adem Boudjemline; Algeria | Mikheil Kajaia; Serbia |

=== Women's freestyle ===
| Event | Gold | Silver | Bronze |
|---|---|---|---|
| 50 kg | Evin Demirhan; Turkey | Julie Sabatié; France | Aintzane Gorría; Spain |
| 53 kg | Maria Prevolaraki; Greece | Aysun Erge; Turkey | Hilary Honorine; France |
| 57 kg | Bediha Gün; Turkey | Carola Rainero; Italy | Graciela Sánchez; Spain |
| 62 kg | Elif Jale Yeşilırmak; Turkey | Marwa Amri; Tunisia | Sara Da Col; Italy |
| 68 kg | Buse Tosun; Turkey | Dalma Caneva; Italy | Samar Amer; Egypt |
