= Jesús Tortosa =

Spanish taekwondo athlete

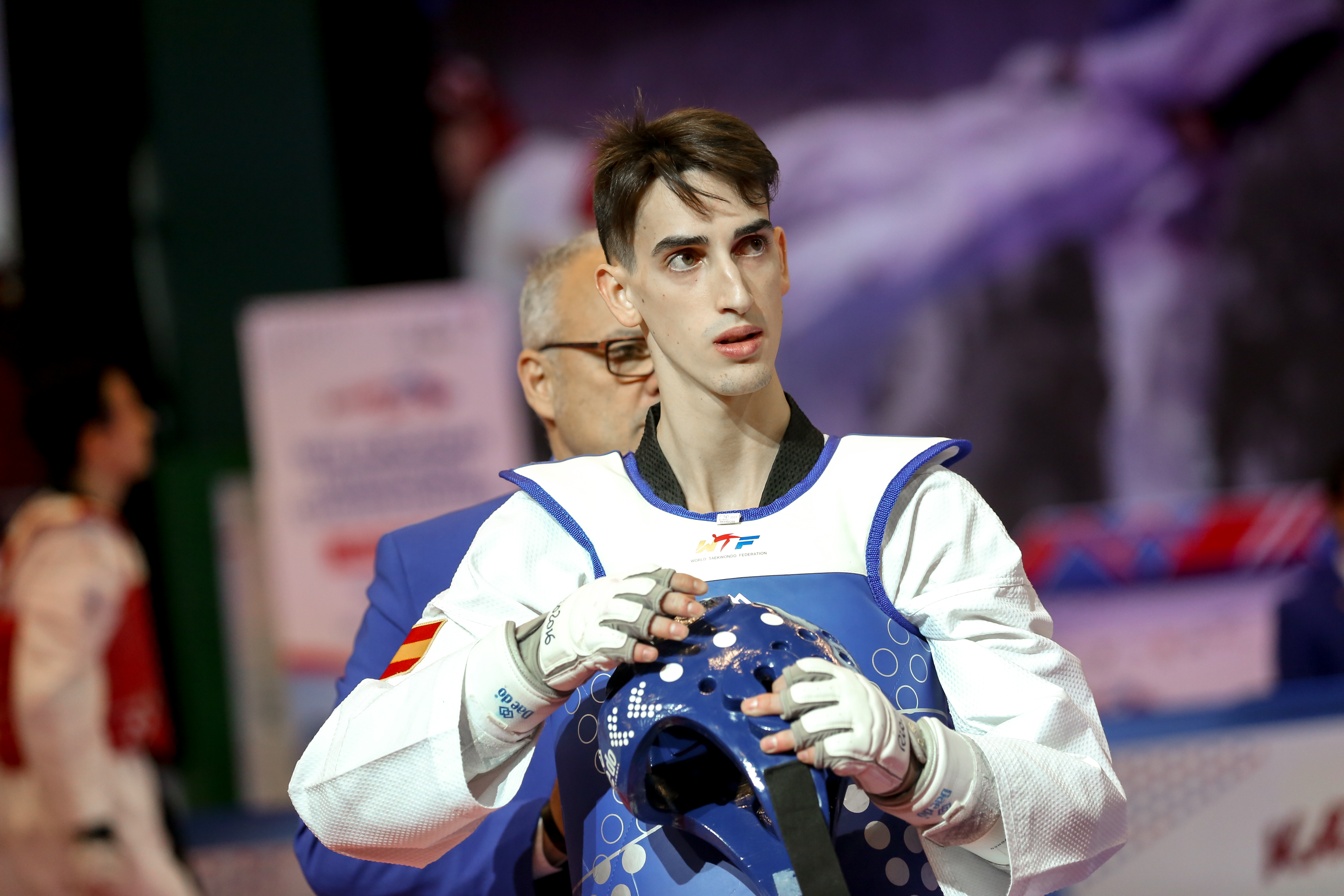
- 2018 European Taekwondo Championships

Personal information
- Full name: Jesús Tortosa Cabrera
- Born: 21 December 1997 (age 28) Madrid, Spain
- Height: 185 cm (6 ft 1 in)
- Weight: 58 kg (128 lb)

Sport
- Country: Spain
- Sport: Taekwondo
- Event: Finweight (54 kg)
- College team: IES Ortega y Gasset of Madrid (H.S.)
- Club: Club Tortosa Arata
- Coached by: Marco Carreira, Jesús Tortosa Alameda
Medal record
Men's taekwondo
Representing Spain
World Taekwondo Championships
Bronze medal – third place	2017 Muju	58 kg
European Games
Silver medal – second place	2015 Baku	58 kg
European Championships
Bronze medal – third place	2014 Baku	54 kg
Silver medal – second place	2016 Montreux	54 kg
Mediterranean Games
Gold medal – first place	2018 Tarragona	58 kg
Grand Prix
Silver medal – second place	2019 Rome	58 kg
Silver medal – second place	2015 Manchester	58 kg
Silver medal – second place	2018 Taoyuan	58 kg
Silver medal – second place	2018 Fujairah	58 kg
Bronze medal – third place	2016 Baku	58 kg
Bronze medal – third place	2017 Moscow	58 kg
Bronze medal – third place	2017 Rabat	58 kg
Bronze medal – third place	2017 London	58 kg
Bronze medal – third place	2017 Abidjan	58 kg
Bronze medal – third place	2018 Manchester	58 kg
Youth Olympic Games
Bronze medal – third place	2014 Nanjing	55 kg
World Junior Championships
Gold medal – first place	2014 Taipei	51 kg
European Under 21 Championships
Gold medal – first place	2014 Innsbruck	54 kg
Gold medal – first place	2015 Bukarest	54 kg
Gold medal – first place	2017 Sofia	58 kg

Jesús Tortosa Cabrera (Note: In this Spanish name, the first or paternal surname is Tortosa and the second or maternal family name is Cabrera.) (born 21 December 1997 in Madrid) is a Spanish taekwondo athlete.

Tortosa first drew attention in March 2014 when he won the gold medal in the under 51 kg division at the World Junior Taekwondo Championships held in Taipei City, Taiwan. In May 2014, Tortosa made his senior debut at the European Taekwondo Championships in Baku, Azerbaijan where he won bronze in the men's finweight (under 54 kg) division.

In June 2015, the 17-year-old boy competed in the inaugural European Games held in Baku, Azerbaijan. Originally a finweight, Tortosa captured the silver medal in the men's 58 kg division. Although he lost to Rui Bragança of Portugal 6-5 in the final, he dominated three-time European champion Levent Tuncat of Germany 17-5 in the semifinals.

In 2016, he won the silver medal in the 2016 European Taekwondo Olympic Qualification Tournament, in Istanbul, Turkey, losing to gold medalist Ron Atias of Israel in the final.
