= Equestrian at the 2018 Mediterranean Games =

- Venue: Royal Polo Club of Barcelona
- Dates: 27, 29 June

The equestrian competition at the 2018 Mediterranean Games was held on 27 and 29 June at the Royal Polo Club of Barcelona in Barcelona.

== Medal summary ==
Event	Gold	Silver	Bronze
Individual jumping	Félicie Bertrand on Sultane; France	Alexandra Paillot on Tonio La Goutelle; France	Abdel Saïd on Hope van Scherpen Donder; Egypt
Team jumping	Portugal (POR); Rodrigo Almeida on Isolde; António Almeida on Irene; Luís Gonçalves on Acheo; Duarte Seabra on Curra Quinn	France (FRA); Félicie Bertrand on Sultane; Alexandra Paillot on Tonio La Goutelle; Pierre-Alain Mortier on Just Do It; Titouan Schumacher on Atome	Italy (ITA); Giampiero Garofalo on Scara Mouche; Francesca Arioldi on Celtic; Filippo Bologni on Quidich; Matteo Leonardi on Marko Polo

== Medal table ==
Rank	Nation	Gold	Silver	Bronze	Total
1	France	1	2	0	3
2	Portugal	1	0	0	1
3	Egypt	0	0	1	1
3	Italy	0	0	1	1
Totals (4 entries)		2	2	2	6
