= Swimming at the 2018 Mediterranean Games – Men's 4 × 100 metre freestyle relay =

Men's 4 × 100 metre freestyle relay at the 2018 Mediterranean Games
- Venue: Campclar Aquatic Center
- Location: Tarragona, Spain
- Dates: 23 June
- Competitors: 32 from 8 nations
- Winning time: 3:15.76

Medalists
gold medal	Velimir Stjepanović; Uroš Nikolić; Andrej Barna; Ivan Lenđer	Serbia
silver medal	Apostolos Christou; Andreas Vazaios; Fotios Koliopoulos; Kristian Golomeev	Greece
bronze medal	Hüseyin Emre Sakçı; İskender Baslakov; Yalım Acımış; Kemal Arda Gürdal	Turkey

The men's 4 × 100 metre freestyle relay event at the 2018 Mediterranean Games was held on 23 June 2018 at the Campclar Aquatic Center.

== Records ==
Prior to this competition, the existing world and Mediterranean Games records were as follows:

World record	United States	3:08.24	Beijing, China	11 August 2008
Mediterranean Games record	France	3:12.03	Pescara, Italy	28 June 2009

== Results ==
The final was held at 18:58.

Rank	Lane	Nation	Swimmers	Time	Notes
1st place, gold medalist(s)	6	Serbia	Velimir Stjepanović (49.04); Uroš Nikolić (48.73); Andrej Barna (48.90); Ivan Lenđer (49.09)	3:15.76	
2nd place, silver medalist(s)	4	Greece	Apostolos Christou (50.69); Andreas Vazaios (49.37); Fotios Koliopoulos (49.51); Kristian Golomeev (48.68)	3:18.25	
3rd place, bronze medalist(s)	2	Turkey	Hüseyin Emre Sakçı (50.47); İskender Baslakov (50.13); Yalım Acımış (50.26); Kemal Arda Gürdal (49.86)	3:20.72	
4	5	Portugal	Miguel Nascimento (50.64); Gabriel Lópes (51.67); Francisco Santos (52.03); Alexis Santos (52.81)	3:27.15	
5	8	Cyprus	Omiros Zagkas (52.04); Vangelis Zorpis (52.08); Thomas Tsiopanis (51.69); Sebastian Konnaris (52.45)	3:28.26	
6	1	Algeria	Ramzi Chouchar (55.15); Moncef Balamane (54.18); Ryad Bouhamidi (57.83); Mohamed Djaballah (53.77)	3:40.93	
	7	Italy	Lorenzo Zazzeri (49.82); Andrea Vergani; Luca Dotto; Alessandro Miressi	DSQ	
	3	Spain	Juan Segura (50.17); Moritz Berg (49.19); Oskitz Aguilar (49.53); Alberto Lozano	DSQ	
