= Swimming at the 2018 Mediterranean Games – Women's 400 metre individual medley =

Women's 400 metre individual medley at the 2018 Mediterranean Games
- Venue: Campclar Aquatic Center
- Location: Tarragona, Spain
- Dates: 23 June
- Competitors: 9 from 7 nations
- Winning time: 4:39.42

Medalists
gold medal	Catalina Corró	Spain
silver medal	Anja Crevar	Serbia
bronze medal	Carlotta Toni	Italy

The women's 400 metre individual medley competition at the 2018 Mediterranean Games was held on 23 June 2018 at the Campclar Aquatic Center.

== Records ==
Prior to this competition, the existing world and Mediterranean Games records were as follows:

World record	Katinka Hosszú (HUN)	4:26.36	Rio de Janeiro, Brazil	6 August 2016
Mediterranean Games record	Anja Klinar (SLO)	4:39.48	Pescara, Italy	29 June 2009

The following records were established during the competition:

Date	Event	Name	Nationality	Time	Record
23 June	Final	Catalina Corró	Spain	4:39.42	GR

== Results ==
=== Heats ===
The heats were held at 10:31.

Rank	Heat	Lane	Name	Nationality	Time	Notes
1	2	4	Mireia Belmonte	Spain	4:40.53	Q
2	1	3	Catalina Corró	Spain	4:42.89	Q
3	2	3	Anja Crevar	Serbia	4:43.94	Q
4	2	6	Viktoriya Zeynep Güneş	Turkey	4:44.43	Q
5	2	5	Victoria Kaminskaya	Portugal	4:45.40	Q
6	1	4	Carlotta Toni	Italy	4:47.82	Q
7	1	5	Ilektra Lebl	Greece	4:50.07	Q
8	1	5	Alessia Polieri	Italy	4:50.18	Q
9	2	2	Rania Nefsi	Algeria	5:05.27	

=== Final ===
The final was held at 18:44.

Rank	Lane	Name	Nationality	Time	Notes
1st place, gold medalist(s)	5	Catalina Corró	Spain	4:39.42	GR
2nd place, silver medalist(s)	3	Anja Crevar	Serbia	4:40.62	NR
3rd place, bronze medalist(s)	7	Carlotta Toni	Italy	4:41.43	
4	2	Victoria Kaminskaya	Portugal	4:42.34	
5	6	Viktoriya Zeynep Güneş	Turkey	4:42.54	
6	8	Alessia Polieri	Italy	4:43.35	
7	4	Mireia Belmonte	Spain	4:43.98	
8	1	Ilektra Lebl	Greece	4:49.75	
