= Gabriel Escobar (boxer) =

Spanish boxer (born 1996)

Personal information
- Born: Gabriel Escobar Mascuñano; 22 July 1996 (age 29) Leganés, Community of Madrid, Spain
- Height: 168 cm (5 ft 6 in)
- Weight: 52 kg (115 lb)

Boxing career
- Weight class: Flyweight
- Stance: Southpaw
Medal record
Men's amateur boxing
Representing Spain
European Games
Gold medal – first place	2019 Minsk	Flyweight
EU Championships
Gold medal – first place	2018 Valladolid	Flyweight
Mediterranean Games
Gold medal – first place	2018 Tarragona	Flyweight
Strandzha Cup
Bronze medal – third place	2018 Sofia	Flyweight

Gabriel Escobar Mascuñano (Note: In this Spanish name, the first or paternal surname is Escobar and the second or maternal family name is Mascuñano.) (born 22 July 1996) is a Spanish amateur boxer who won gold medals at the 2018 EU Championships, 2018 Mediterranean Games, and 2019 European Games.
