= Kemal Arda Gürdal =

Turkish swimmer (born 1990)

Personal information
- Nationality: Turk
- Born: 2 July 1990 (age 36)
- Height: 1.80 m (5 ft 11 in)
- Weight: 77 kg (170 lb)

Sport
- Sport: Swimming
- Strokes: Freestyle
- Club: Galatasaray Swimming
Medal record
Representing Turkey
Mediterranean Games
Bronze medal – third place	2018 Tarragona	4x100m freestyle relay
Bronze medal – third place	2018 Tarragona	4x100m medley relay
Silver medal – second place	2013 Mersin	100 m freestyle
Silver medal – second place	2013 Mersin	4×100 m freestyle
Bronze medal – third place	2013 Mersin	4×200 m freestyle
Bronze medal – third place	2013 Mersin	4×100 m medley

Kemal Arda Gürdal (born 2 July 1990) is a Turkish freestyle swimmer. At the 2012 European Aquatics Championships held in Debrecen, Hungary, he set a new national record in 100 m freestyle with 49.64, and equaled the national record in 200 m freestyle of Aytekin Mindan from 2002.

Gürdal was invited for participation in the 100 m freestyle event at the 2012 Summer Olympics. At the 2013 Mediterranean Games held in Mersin, Turkey, he won two silver and two bronze medals.

== Achievements ==
Year	Competition	Venue	Position	Event	Notes	
2009	World Aquatics Championships	Rome, Italy	53	200 m freestyle	1:50.79	
2009	World Aquatics Championships	Rome, Italy	47	400 m freestyle	3:59.47	
2012	Swim Cup Eindhoven	Eindhoven, Netherlands	6	100 m freestyle	50.96	
2012	Swim Cup Eindhoven	Eindhoven, Netherlands	7	200 m freestyle	1:53.32	
2012	Swim Cup Eindhoven	Eindhoven, Netherlands	9	50 m backstroke	26.60	
2012	Swim Cup	Amsterdam, Netherlands	8	50 m freestyle	23.79	
2012	Swim Cup	Amsterdam, Netherlands	11	100 m freestyle	51.78	
2012	Swim Cup	Amsterdam, Netherlands	5	200 m freestyle	1:52.99	
2012	Summer Olympics	London, United Kingdom	27	100 m freestyle	49.71	
2012	European Championships	Debrecen, Hungary	14 (prelim)	100 m freestyle	49.64 NR	
2012	European Championships	Debrecen, Hungary	21 (prelim)	200 m freestyle	1:50.40=Equal to NR	
2012	World Championships (25 m)	Istanbul, Turkey	24	200 m freestyle	1:46.09	
2012	World Championships (25 m)	Istanbul, Turkey	8	4 × 100 m freestyle relay	3:13.73	*
2013	Mediterranean Games	Mersin, Turkey	2nd place, silver medalist(s)	100 m freestyle		
2013	Mediterranean Games	Mersin, Turkey	2nd place, silver medalist(s)	4 × 100 m freestyle relay		
2013	Mediterranean Games	Mersin, Turkey	3rd place, bronze medalist(s)	4 × 200 m freestyle relay		
2013	Mediterranean Games	Mersin, Turkey	3rd place, bronze medalist(s)	4 × 100 m medley relay		
