= Manuel Cappai =

Italian boxer (born 1992)

Medal record

Men's amateur boxing

Representing Italy

European Games
Bronze medal – third place	2019 Minsk	Flyweight

European Championships
Bronze medal – third place	2022 Yerevan	Bantamweight

Manuel Cappai (born 9 October 1992 in Cagliari) is an Italian boxer who competed at the 2012 Summer Olympics in the light flyweight division where he lost in the first round to Filipino boxer Mark Anthony Barriga. Cappai won a bronze medal in the flyweight division at the 2018 Mediterranean Games.

Cappai is an athlete of the Gruppo Sportivo Fiamme Oro.
