= Catalina Corró =

Spanish swimmer

Personal information
- Nationality: Spanish
- Born: 14 April 1995 (age 31)

Sport
- Sport: Swimming
Medal record
Women's swimming
Representing Spain
Mediterranean Games
Gold medal – first place	2018 Tarragona	400 m medley
Silver medal – second place	2013 Mersin	4×200 m freestyle
European Junior Championships
Bronze medal – third place	2011 Belgrade	4×200 m freestyle

Catalina Corró (born 14 April 1995) is a Spanish swimmer. She competed in the women's 400 metre freestyle event at the 2018 FINA World Swimming Championships (25 m), in Hangzhou, China.
