= Shooting at the 2018 Mediterranean Games =

- Venue: Sant Salvador Pavilion; Shooting Range Jordi Tarragó
- Dates: 23–24 June

The shooting competitions at the 2018 Mediterranean Games in Tarragona took place on 23 and 24 June at the Sant Salvador Pavilion and the Shooting Range Jordi Tarragó.

Athletes competed in 6 events.

== Medal summary ==
=== Men's events ===
| Event | Gold | Silver | Bronze |
|---|---|---|---|
| 10 metre air pistol | Damir Mikec; Serbia | Kevin Venta; Slovenia | João Costa; Portugal |
| 10 metre air rifle | Milutin Stefanović; Serbia | Jorge Díaz García; Spain | Simon Weithaler; Italy |
| Trap | Antonio Bailón; Spain | Ahmed Kamar; Egypt | Giovanni Pellielo; Italy |

=== Women's events ===
| Event | Gold | Silver | Bronze |
|---|---|---|---|
| 10 metre air pistol | Anna Korakaki; Greece | Zorana Arunović; Serbia | Afaf El-Hodhod; Egypt |
| 10 metre air rifle | Andrea Arsović; Serbia | Martina Ziviani; Italy | Živa Dvoršak; Slovenia |
| Trap | Alessandra Perilli; San Marino | Fátima Gálvez; Spain | Maria Lucia Palmitessa; Italy |

=== Medal table ===
| Rank | Nation | Gold | Silver | Bronze | Total |
|---|---|---|---|---|---|
| 1 | Serbia | 3 | 1 | 0 | 4 |
| 2 | Spain* | 1 | 2 | 0 | 3 |
| 3 | Greece | 1 | 0 | 0 | 1 |
| 3 | San Marino | 1 | 0 | 0 | 1 |
| 5 | Italy | 0 | 1 | 3 | 4 |
| 6 | Egypt | 0 | 1 | 1 | 2 |
| 6 | Slovenia | 0 | 1 | 1 | 2 |
| 8 | Portugal | 0 | 0 | 1 | 1 |
| Totals (8 entries) | | 6 | 6 | 6 | 18 |
