= Živa Dvoršak =

Slovenian sports shooter (born 1991)

Personal information
- Born: 9 July 1991 (age 34) Ljubljana, Slovenia
- Height: 1.68 m (5 ft 6 in)
- Weight: 70 kg (154 lb)

Sport
- Sport: Sports shooting
Medal record
Women's shooting
Representing Slovenia
Mediterranean Games
Bronze medal – third place	2018 Taragona	10 m air rifle
Bronze medal – third place	2022 Oran	10 m air rifle
Bronze medal – third place	2022 Oran	10 m air rifle mixed team

Živa Dvoršak (born 9 July 1991) is a Slovenian sports shooter. She competed in the Women's 10 metre air rifle and women's 50 metre rifle three positions events at the 2012 and 2016 Summer Olympics. She won a bronze at the 2013 European 10 metre events Championships in the 10 metre air rifle.

She studied at the University of Ljubljana from 2010 to 2013, and later studied mathematics at West Virginia University.
