= Elena Vukić =

Croatian volleyball player (born 1991)

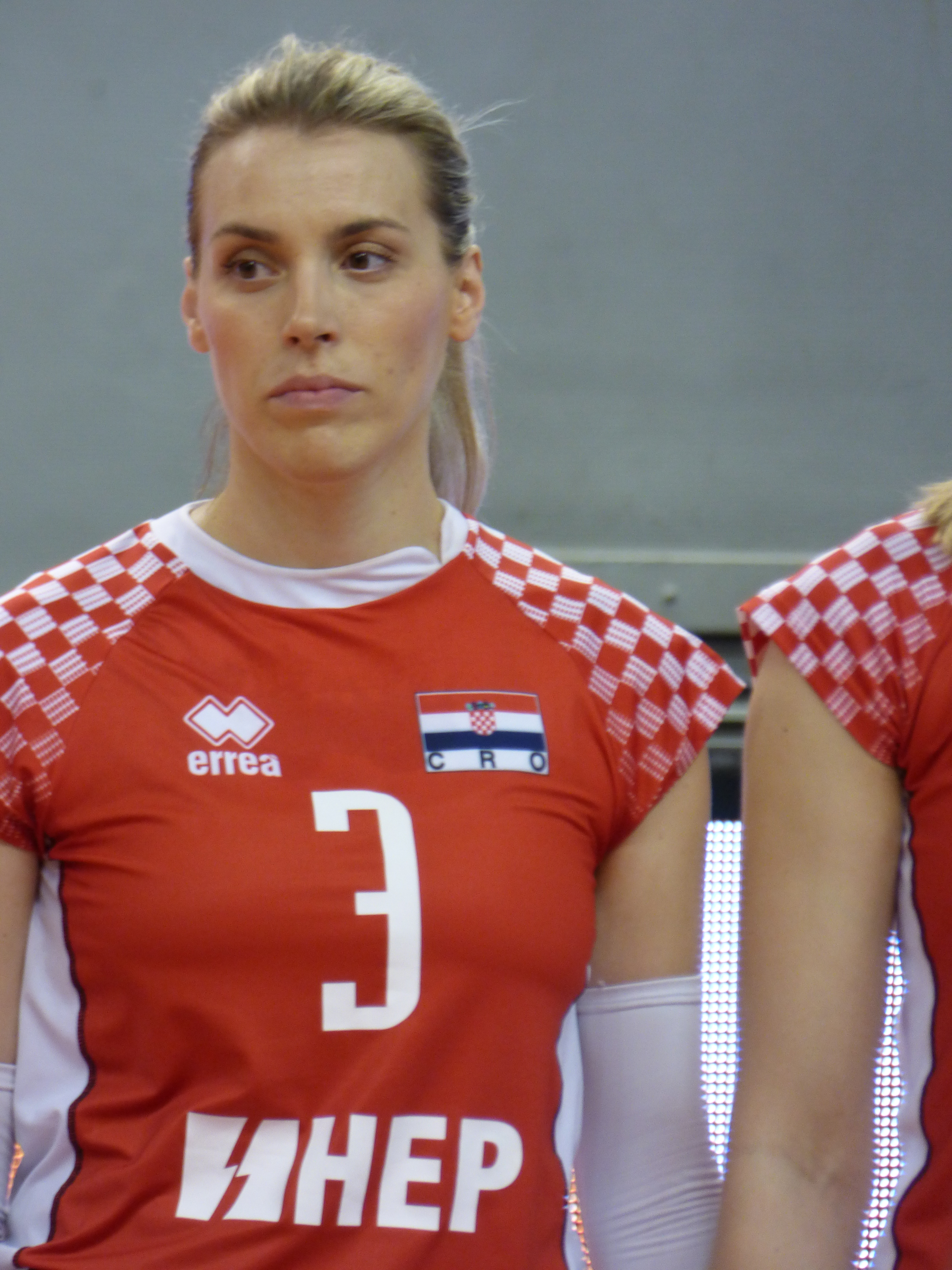

Personal information
- Born: 10 December 1991 (age 34); Split, Croatia
- Height: 1.89 m (6 ft 2 in)
- Weight: 75 kg (165 lb)
- Spike: 301 cm (119 in)
- Block: 293 cm (115 in)

Volleyball information
- Position: Outside hitter
- Current club: OK Brda

Career
Years	Teams
2012–2018; 2018–2019; 2019–2020; 2020–2023; 2023–	OK Marina Kaštela; OK Kamnik; OK Kaštela; OK Marina Kaštela; OK Brda

National team
Croatia
Honours
Women's volleyball
Representing Croatia
Mediterranean Games
Gold medal – first place	2018 Tarragona

Elena Vukić (born 10 December 1991) is a Croatian volleyball player. She plays as outside hitter for Croatian club OK Brda.
