= Marija Obradović (handballer) =

Serbian handball player (born 1992)

Personal information
- Nationality: Serbian
- Born: 6 August 1992 (age 34) Belgrade, Serbia
- Height: 1.82 m (6 ft 0 in)

Sport
- Sport: Handball
- Position: Left back
- Number: 51

Senior clubs
- Years: Team
- 2011-2012: RK Crvena Zvezda
- 2013-2014: ŽRK BMS Milenium
- 2014-2015: RK Zagorje
- 2015-2016: RK Krim
- 2016-2022: TuS Metzingen
- 2021-2022: HH Elite
National team
Years	Team	Apps	(Gls)
–	Serbia	64	(113)

Marija Obradović (born 6 August 1992) is a Serbian former female handball player for the Serbia national team.

She was part of the team at the 2016 European Women's Handball Championship.

She played for German club TuS Metzingen from 2016 to 2021, where she joined Danish side HH Elite. She retired after the 2021–22 season.
