= D. I. Antoniou =

Greek poet

Dimitrios Antoniou, better known by his pen name D. I. Antoniou (Greek: Δ.Ι. Αντωνίου, real name: Δημήτριος Αντωνίου, Dimitrios Antoniou; 1906–1994), was a Greek poet.

== Life ==
Antoniou hailed from a seafaring family that traced their origins to the island of Kasos, and he was born in 1906 whilst his family was based in Beira in Portuguese Mozambique. After spending his childhood in Suez and early education in Athens, he enrolled at the University of Athens, where he formally studied philosophy but also received informal training on a variety of subjects of interest, including music, which influenced his poetry in later years. Deciding to follow his family's traditions, he dropped out of university in 1928 and started a seafaring career, rising up the ranks in merchant ships. He served as a second officer on the ship Peleus during the 1930s and during the German invasion of Greece, he was a reserve officer at the destroyer Keios. After the war he returned to commercial seafaring and eventually became a captain. Other ships in which he served included the Achilleis and the Agamemnon. He retired from his seafaring career in 1968.

He died in Athens on 6 February 1994.

== Literary career ==
His first published poetry appeared in the journal Pnoi in 1929. He was influenced by the New Athenian School of Kostis Palamas to write in demotic Greek, what Kimon Friar calls "pure demotic style as though written in shorthand". He became one of the poets known as the Generation of the '30s, along with poets such as Giorgos Seferis and Odysseas Elytis. Friar, however, notes that Antoniou appeared to have "his own voice", without subscribing to any school of literature. His poems appeared in Ta Nea Grammata between 1936 and 1939. These were reprinted in the book Poems (Ποιήματα) in 1939, which was well received by figures such as Seferis, Andreas Karantonis and Konstantinos Tsatsos.

His writing generally consisted of short poems that appeared in press only sporadically. An exception to this was his long poem Indies (Ινδίες), which consisted of 1,040 verses. Antoniou started writing this in late 1933, whilst he was on the Peleus, visiting villages in the Bay of Bengal. He resorts to exotic imagery, telling about an encounter with a civilisation that he considered to be "primitive". He continued working on this poem through the years, and the last part is a homage to Peleus, which was sunk by the German navy in 1944. Friar notes that with his exploration of these incidents over time, Antoniou's act of remembrance itself lends itself to a distinction that is "impossible to translate adequately into English: that between hronos, time as a finite entity, and keros, the fluidity of time without past, present or future". His obituary in Nea Estia notes that Antoniou's exotic imagery contrasts with another seafaring Greek poet, Nikos Kavvadias, in that his verse includes more of a "contemplation, humanity and meaning" regarding the experience of being at sea or constantly travelling, thus adding a layer beyond the façade of the exotic imagery. The book Indies was published in 1967 and won the Second State Prize for Poetry.

Antoniou published more of his poetry in the periodical Angloelliniki Epitheorisi (Αγγλοελληνική Επιθεώρηση) in 1954. He published two more collections in 1972: Hai Kai (Χάι-Κάι) and Tanka (Τάνκα). The latter won the First State Prize for Poetry.
