= Ervin Holpert =

Serbian canoeist (born 1986)

Personal information
- Born: April 22, 1986 (age 40) Sombor, SR Serbia, Yugoslavia
Medal record
Men's canoe sprint
Representing Serbia
European Games
Bronze medal – third place	2023 Kraków-Małopolska	K-2 500 m
European Championships
Bronze medal – third place	2012 Zagreb	K-4 1000 m
Silver medal – second place	2017 Plovdiv	K-2 500 m
Mediterranean Games
Silver medal – second place	2013 Mersin	K-2 1000 m
Bronze medal – third place	2018 Tarragona	K-2 500 m

Ervin Holpert (Serbian Cyrillic: Ервин Холперт, April 22, 1986 in Sombor, SR Serbia, Yugoslavia) is a Serbian sprint canoer.

He won a bronze medal in the K-4 1000 m event at the 2012 Canoe Sprint European Championships in Zagreb.

Holpert also competing in the K-4 1000 m event at the 2012 Summer Olympics in London. He is an ethnic Hungarian.
