= Rui Bragança =

Portuguese taekwondo practitioner

Personal information
- Full name: Rui Pedro Rebelo Bragança
- Nationality: Portuguese
- Born: 26 December 1991 (age 34) Guimarães, Portugal
- Education: Medicine
- Height: 1.80 m (5 ft 11 in)
- Weight: 58 kg (128 lb)

Sport
- Sport: Taekwondo
- Event: 58 kg
- University team: University of Minho
- Club: Benfica
- Coached by: Hugo Serrão; Joaquim Peixoto (national); Pedro Campaniço (national)

Achievements and titles
- Highest world ranking: 1st (−58kg)
Medal record
Men's taekwondo
Representing Portugal
World Championships
Silver medal – second place	2011 Gyeongju	58 kg
Bronze medal – third place	2019 Manchester	58 kg
Grand Prix
Gold medal – first place	2015 Sansum	58 kg
Bronze medal – third place	2014 Manchester	58 kg
European Games
Gold medal – first place	2015 Baku	58 kg
European Championships
Gold medal – first place	2014 Baku	58 kg
Gold medal – first place	2016 Montreux	58 kg
Bronze medal – third place	2021 Sofia	58 kg
Mediterranean Games
Silver medal – second place	2018 Tarragona	58 kg
Universiade
Silver medal – second place	2017 Gwangju	58 kg
Silver medal – second place	2017 Taipei	58 kg
Lusophony Games
Gold medal – first place	2014 Goa	58 kg
European Junior Championships
Bronze medal – third place	2007 Baku	55 kg
- Updated on June 2018

Rui Pedro Rebelo Bragança (born 26 December 1991) is a Portuguese taekwondo practitioner who competes in the men's 58 kg (flyweight) category.

== Career ==
Born in Guimarães, Bragança started practising taekwondo with 13 years old, when he joined a class at Vitória de Guimarães gym. Two years later; he won the Portuguese National Junior Championships, which led to a spot at the European Junior Championships in Baku, where he won the bronze medal.

In 2014, Bragança led the world ranking in his weight category.

He graduated in Medicine at University of Minho.

In 2016 he signed with Benfica, along with his coach Hugo Serrão and his training partner Nuno Costa, all coming from Vitória de Guimarães. In 2019 he extended his contract for two more years with the main focus on the 2020 Summer Olympics.

He has qualified to the 2020 Summer Olympics through the 2021 European Taekwondo Olympic Qualification Tournament.
