= Croatia at the 2018 Mediterranean Games =

- IOC code: CRO

in Tarragona, Spain
- Medals Ranked 9th: Gold 9 Silver 5 Bronze 3 Total 17

Mediterranean Games appearances (overview)
- 1993; 1997; 2001; 2005; 2009; 2013; 2018; 2022

Other related appearances
- Yugoslavia (1951–1991)

Croatia competed at the 2018 Mediterranean Games in Tarragona, Spain from 22 June to 1 July 2018.

== Medals by sport ==
Sport	Gold	Silver	Bronze	Total
Athletics	2	1	0	3
Boules	2	0	0	2
Taekwondo	1	1	1	3
Handball	1	0	0	1
Rowing	1	0	0	1
Volleyball	1	0	0	1
Weightlifting	1	0	0	1
Artistic gymnastics	0	1	0	1
Boxing	0	1	0	1
Karate	0	1	0	1
Wrestling	0	0	2	2
Totals (11 entries)	9	5	3	17

== Medalists ==
Medal	Name	Sport	Event	Date
Gold	Sandra Perković	Athletics	Women's discus throw	28 June
Gold	Andrea Ivančević	Athletics	Women's 100 metres hurdles	29 June
Gold	Matea Jelić	Taekwondo	Women's 67 kg	29 June
Gold	Luka Radonić	Rowing	Men's lightweight single sculls	30 June
Gold	Pero Ćubela	Boules	Men's precision throw	30 June
Gold	Nives Jelovica	Boules	Women's precision throw	30 June
Gold	Amar Musić	Weightlifting	Men's 85 kg	30 June
Gold	Men's handball team: Matej Ašanin Josip Božić Pavletić Bruno Butorac Josip Ereš Tin Kontrec Halil Jaganjac Lovro Jotić David Mandić Petar Medić Ante Kaleb Valentino Ravnić Marin Šipić Ivan Sršen Mate Šunjić Leon Šušnja Jakov Vranković (Team coached by Lino Červar)	Handball	Men's tournament	1 July
Gold	Women's volleyball team: Nikolina Božičević Bernarda Brčić Božana Butigan Beta Dumančić Samanta Fabris Vedrana Jakšetić Dinka Kulić Sanja Popović Rene Sain Martina Šamadan Elena Vukić Antonia Volmut (Team coached by Frane Žanić)	Volleyball	Women's tournament	1 July
Silver	Enes Garibović	Karate	Men's 75 kg	24 June
Silver	Robert Seligman	Artistic gymnastics	Men's pommel horse	26 June
Silver	Stipe Žunić	Athletics	Men's shot put	27 June
Silver	Kristina Tomić	Taekwondo	Women's 49 kg	28 June
Silver	Toni Filipi	Boxing	Men's heavyweight	30 June
Bronze	Ivan Lizatović	Wrestling	Men's Greco-Roman 60 kg	24 June
Bronze	Božo Starčević	Wrestling	Men's Greco-Roman 77 kg	24 June
Bronze	Nikita Glasnović	Taekwondo	Women's 57 kg	28 June
