= Canal Olímpic de Catalunya =

Canal in Castelldefels, Catalonia, Spain

Coordinates: 41.2754°N 1.9924°E

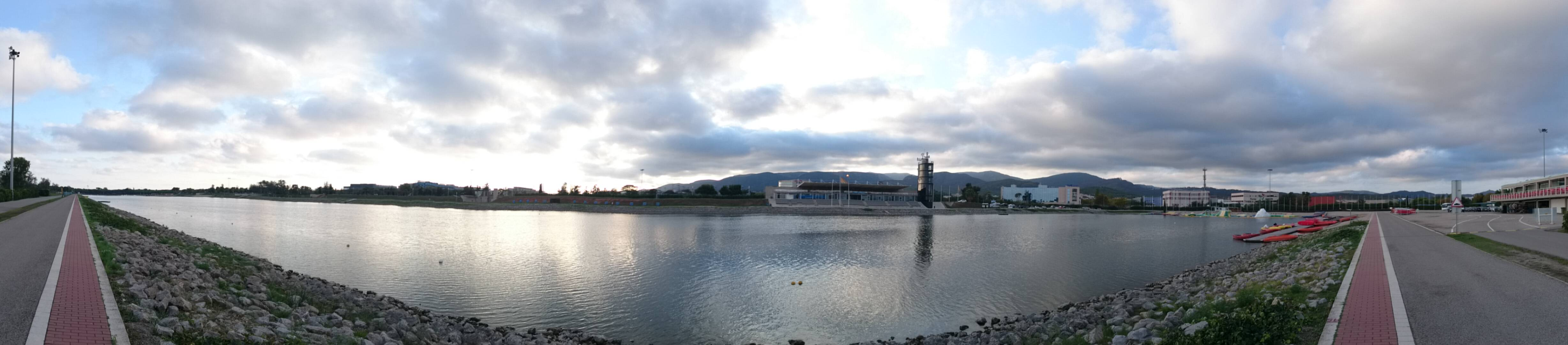
The Canal Olímpic de Catalunya is a canal located in Castelldefels, Catalonia, Spain. Constructed in 1991, it hosted the canoe sprint events for the 1992 Summer Olympics.
