= Morocco at the 2018 Mediterranean Games =

- IOC code: MAR

in Tarragona, Spain
- Medals Ranked 8th: Gold 10 Silver 7 Bronze 7 Total 24

Mediterranean Games appearances (overview)
- 1959; 1963; 1967; 1971; 1975; 1979; 1983; 1987; 1991; 1993; 1997; 2001; 2005; 2009; 2013; 2018; 2022; 2026

Morocco competed at the 2018 Mediterranean Games in Tarragona, Spain from 22 June to 1 July 2018.

== Medals ==
Medals by sport
Sport	1st place, gold medalist(s)	2nd place, silver medalist(s)	3rd place, bronze medalist(s)	Total	Rank
Karate	1	1	0	2	4

Morocco won 2 awards, as well as a rank of 4.

== Karate ==
Abdessalam Ameknassi won the gold medal in the men's kumite 60 kg event. Aicha Sayah won the silver medal in the women's kumite 50 kg event.
