= Portugal at the 2018 Mediterranean Games =

- IOC code: POR
- NOC: Olympic Committee of Portugal
- Competitors: 280 in 29 sports
- Medals Ranked 13th: Gold 3 Silver 8 Bronze 13 Total 24

Mediterranean Games appearances (overview)
- 1951; 1955; 1959; 1963; 1967; 1971; 1975; 1979; 1983; 1987; 1991; 1993; 1997; 2001; 2005; 2009; 2013; 2018; 2022

Portugal competes at the 2018 Mediterranean Games in Taragona, Spain from 22 June to 1 July 2018.

== Medal summary ==
=== Medal table ===
Medal	Name	Sport	Event	Date
Gold	João Pereira	Triathlon	Men's individual sprint	23 June
Gold	Melanie Santos	Triathlon	Women's individual sprint	23 June
Gold	Portugal	Equestrian	Team jumping	28 June
Silver	Fernando Pimenta	Canoeing	Men's K-1 - 500m	24 June
Silver	Joana Vasconcelos	Canoeing	Women's K-1 - 500m	24 June
Silver	Ana Catarina Monteiro	Swimming	Women's 200 m butterfly	25 June
Bronze	Alexis Santos	Swimming	Men's 200 m individual medley	23 June
Bronze	João Costa	Shooting	Men's 10 m air pistol	23 June
Bronze	João Vital	Swimming	Men's 400 m individual medley	24 June
Bronze	Teresa Portela	Canoeing	Women's K-1 - 200m	24 June
Bronze	Diana Durães	Swimming	Women's 400 m freestyle	24 June
Bronze	Rafael Silva	Cycling	Men's road race	27 June
Bronze	Anri Egutidze	Judo	Half-middleweight (81 kg)	28 June

Medals by sport
Sport	1st place, gold medalist(s)	2nd place, silver medalist(s)	3rd place, bronze medalist(s)	Total
Canoeing	0	2	1	3
Cycling	0	0	1	1
Equestrian	1	0	0	1
Judo	0	0	1	1
Shooting	0	0	1	1
Swimming	0	1	3	4
Triathlon	2	0	0	2
Total	3	3	7	13

Medals by date
Day	Date	1st place, gold medalist(s)	2nd place, silver medalist(s)	3rd place, bronze medalist(s)	Total
1	23 June	2	0	2	4
2	24 June	0	2	2	4
3	25 June	1	0	1	2
4	26 June	0	0	0	0
5	27 June	0	1	0	1
6	28 June	1	0	1	2
7	29 June	0	0	0	0
8	30 June	0	0	0	0
9	1 July	0	0	0	0
Total		3	3	7	13

Medals by gender
Gender	1st place, gold medalist(s)	2nd place, silver medalist(s)	3rd place, bronze medalist(s)	Total
Male	1	1	5	7
Female	1	2	2	5
Mixed	1	0	0	1
Total	3	3	7	13
