= 2018 Mediterranean Games =

18th edition of the Mediterranean Games

XVIII Mediterranean Games
- Emblem of the 2018 Mediterranean Games
- Host city: Tarragona
- Country: Spain
- Edition: 18th
- Nations: 26
- Debuting countries: Kosovo Portugal
- Athletes: 3,648
- Sport: 28
- Events: 244
- Opening: 22 June 2018
- Closing: 1 July 2018
- Opened by: Felipe VI of Spain
- Main venue: Nou Estadi

The 2018 Mediterranean Games (Catalan: Jocs Mediterranis de 2018, Spanish: Juegos Mediterráneos de 2018), officially known as the XVIII Mediterranean Games (Catalan: XVIII Jocs Mediterranis, Spanish: XVIII Juegos Mediterráneos) and commonly known as Tarragona 2018, was an international multi-sport event held from 22 June to 1 July 2018 in Tarragona, Catalonia, Spain. Tarragona was announced as the host city at the ICMG General Assembly in Mersin, Turkey, on 15 October 2011.

== Bidding process ==
The host city was announced during the ICMG General Assembly scheduled which took place in Mersin, Turkey (host of the 2013 Mediterranean Games) on 15 October 2011. The final candidates were Alexandria and Tarragona, where Tarragona won the vote 36–34.

- Alexandria, Egypt

Alexandria hosted the first Mediterranean Games and planned to build a new Olympic Village for the 2017 Mediterranean Games in the iconic South Mediterranean city.

- Tarragona, Spain

Under the motto "History making history", Tarragona planned to take the Games to Spain for the third time after the 1955 Mediterranean Games in Barcelona and the 2005 Mediterranean Games in Almería.

2018 Mediterranean Games bidding results
City	NOC	Round 1
Tarragona	Spain	36
Alexandria	Egypt	34

== Development and preparation ==
Tarracus

The International Committee of the Mediterranean Games (ICMG) announced in November 2016 that Tarragona was postponing its hosting of the Mediterranean Games from 2017 to 2018 due to funding problems caused by Spanish political and economical instability.

Some doubts were expressed in 2017 about the holding of the games due to the 2017 Spanish constitutional crisis after the Catalan government unilaterally declared independence on 27 October.

=== Marketing ===
Tarracus, a humanoid character wearing a Roman helmet, was unveiled as the mascot for 2018 Mediterranean Games in May 2016. The pattern on the helmet plume is based on the flag of Tarragona.

== The Games ==
=== Sports ===
The 2018 Mediterranean Games sports program featured 28 sports encompassing 244 events. The number of events in each discipline is noted in parentheses. Triathlon was the only new sport added to the Mediterranean Games program. Equestrian and Golf came back after being absent in Mersin. Disabled events were held in swimming and athletics. Basketball tournament was held in the 3x3 format. Boxing and football were only men's events, while Rhythmic Gymnastics was women's only. The number in paratheses next to the sport is the number of medal events per sport.

2018 Mediterranean Games sports programme

- Aquatics
  - Swimming (38)
  - Paralympic swimming (2)
  - Water polo (2)
- Archery (4)
- Athletics
  - Athletics (34)
  - Paralympic athletics (1)
- Badminton (4)
- Basketball (2)
- Bowls (9)
- Boxing (9)
- Canoeing (5)
- Cycling (4)
- Equestrian (2)
- Fencing (4)
- Football (1)
- Golf (4)
- Gymnastics
  - Artistic gymnastics (14)
  - Rhythmic gymnastics (1)
- Handball (2)
- Judo (14)
- Karate (10)
- Rowing (6)
- Sailing (4)
- Shooting (6)
- Table tennis (4)
- Taekwondo (8)
- Tennis (4)
- Triathlon (2)
- Volleyball
  - Beach volleyball (2)
  - Volleyball (2)
- Water skiing (2)
- Weightlifting (24)
- Wrestling (14)

=== Participating nations ===
The 2018 Mediterranean Games were the first Games in which Kosovo was eligible to participate.

Participating National Committees
- Albania (59)
- Algeria (233)
- Andorra (34)
- Bosnia and Herzegovina (70)
- Croatia (99)
- Cyprus (123)
- Egypt (177)
- France (310)
- Greece (299)
- Italy (419) (top)
- Kosovo (40)
- Lebanon (21)
- Libya (30)
- (North Macedonia) Macedonia (72)
- Malta (11)
- Monaco (22)
- Montenegro (57)
- Morocco (114)
- Portugal (233)
- San Marino (16)
- Serbia (140)
- Slovenia (174)
- Spain (396) (host)
- Syria (33)
- Tunisia (132)
- Turkey (349)

=== Calendar ===
●	Opening ceremony	●	Competitions	●	Event finals	●	Closing ceremony

	June / July									
Sport	22nd Fri	23rd Sat	24th Sun	25th Mon	26th Tue	27th Wed	28th Thu	29th Fri	30th Sat	1st Sun
Ceremonies	●									●
Archery	●	●	4							
Artistic gymnastics		●	2	2	10					
Athletics						5	7	11	12	
Badminton		●	●	2	2					
Basketball						●	●	2		
Beach volleyball							●	●	2	
Bowls							●	4	5	
Boxing				●	●	●	●	●	9	
Canoeing		●	5							
Cycling						2			2	
Equestrian						1		1		
Fencing			2	2						
Football	●		●		●		●	●	1	
Golf				●	●	●	4			
Handball		●	●	●	●	●	●	●	1	1
Judo						5	5	4		
Karate		7	3							
Rhythmic gymnastics								●	1	
Rowing							●	●	6	
Sailing		●	●	●	●	●	●	4		
Shooting		2	4							
Swimming		13	13	14						
Table tennis					●	●	2	●	2	
Taekwondo							3	3	2	
Tennis					●	●	●	2	2	
Triathlon		2								
Volleyball	●	●	●	●	●	●	●	●	●	2
Water polo						●	●	●	1	1
Water skiing		●	2							
Weightlifting		4	6	4	6	4				
Wrestling			●	5	4	5				
Total	0	28	41	29	22	22	21	31	46	4
Cumulative Total	0	28	69	98	120	142	163	194	240	244
	June / July									
Sport	22nd Fri	23rd Sat	24th Sun	25th Mon	26th Tue	27th Wed	28th Thu	29th Fri	30th Sat	1st Sun

=== Medal table ===
* Host nation (Spain)

Rank	Nation	Gold	Silver	Bronze	Total
1	Italy	56	56	44	156
2	Spain*	38	40	44	122
3	Turkey	31	25	39	95
4	France	28	31	40	99
5	Egypt	18	11	16	45
6	Greece	12	14	22	48
7	Serbia	12	11	9	32
8	Morocco	10	7	7	24
9	Croatia	9	5	3	17
10	Tunisia	6	13	13	32
11	Slovenia	4	9	23	36
12	Cyprus	4	2	2	8
13	Portugal	3	8	13	24
14	Kosovo	3	1	0	4
15	Algeria	2	4	7	13
16	Syria	2	2	3	7
17	Macedonia	2	1	3	6
18	San Marino	2	0	0	2
19	Bosnia and Herzegovina	1	1	3	5
20	Albania	1	1	0	2
21	Monaco	0	2	0	2
22	Montenegro	0	1	2	3
23	Lebanon	0	1	0	1
24	Malta	0	0	1	1
25	Andorra	0	0	0	0
25	Libya	0	0	0	0
Totals (26 entries)		244	246	294	784

Source: Medal Standings

== Broadcasting ==
Territory	Broadcaster	Ref
Albania	RTSH	
Algeria	EPTV	
Andorra and Spain	TV3; RTVE; Movistar+	
Bosnia and Herzegovina	BHRT; RTRS; FTV	
Croatia	HRT	
Cyprus	CyBC	
France	France Télévisions; Canal+	
Greece	ERT	
Italy	RAI	
Macedonia	MRT	
MENA	ASBU; beIN Sports	
Montenegro	RTCG	
Morocco	SNRT	
Portugal	RTP; Sport TV	
San Marino	RAI	
Serbia	RTS	
Slovenia	RTV Slovenija	
Tunisia	ERTT	
Turkey	TRT	

Preceded by Mersin	Mediterranean Games; Tarragona; 2018	Succeeded by Oran
