= France at the 2018 Mediterranean Games =

- IOC code: FRA

Mediterranean Games appearances (overview)
- 1951; 1955; 1959; 1963; 1967; 1971; 1975; 1979; 1983; 1987; 1991; 1993; 1997; 2001; 2005; 2009; 2013; 2018; 2022

France competed at the 2018 Mediterranean Games in Tarragona, Spain from 22 June to 1 July 2018.

== Medals ==
Medals by sport
Sport	1st place, gold medalist(s)	2nd place, silver medalist(s)	3rd place, bronze medalist(s)	Total	Rank
Karate	2	1	1	4	2
Swimming	2	2	2	6	6

== Karate ==
Marvin Garin won the gold medal in the men's kumite 67 kg event and Jessie Da Costa won the silver medal in the men's kumite 84 kg event.

Nancy Garcia won the gold medal in the women's kumite +68 kg event and Sabrina Ouihaddadene won the bronze medal women's kumite 55 kg event.
