= Spain at the 2018 Mediterranean Games =

- IOC code: ESP
- NOC: Spanish Olympic Committee
- Competitors: 396 in 30 sports
- Flag bearers: Mireia Belmonte (opening); Jorge Fernández Valcárcel (closing)
- Medals Ranked 2nd: Gold 38 Silver 40 Bronze 44 Total 122

Mediterranean Games appearances (overview)
- 1951; 1955; 1959; 1963; 1967; 1971; 1975; 1979; 1983; 1987; 1991; 1993; 1997; 2001; 2005; 2009; 2013; 2018; 2022

Spain competed at the 2018 Mediterranean Games in Tarragona, Spain over 10 days from 22 June to 1 July 2018.

== Medal summary ==
=== Medal table ===
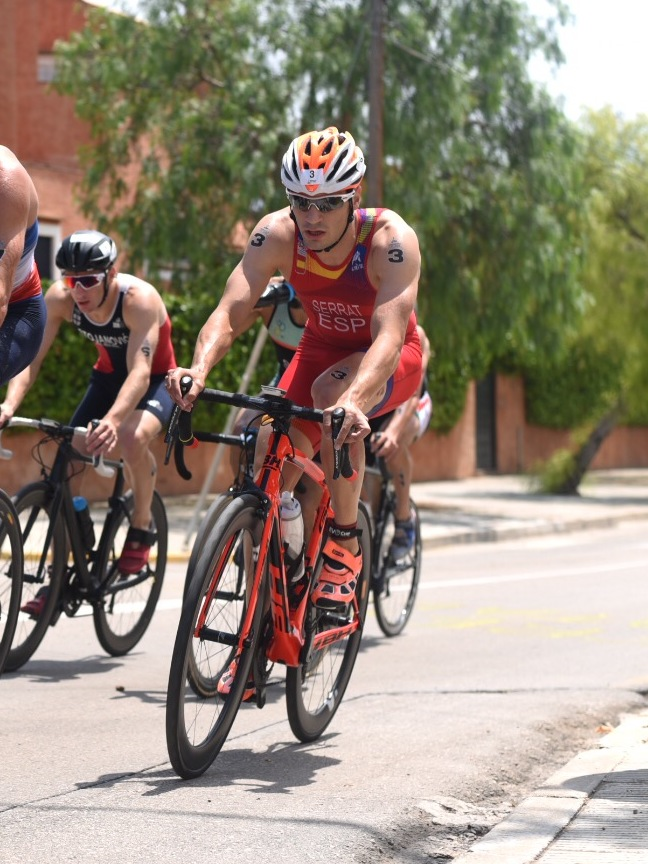
Antonio Serrat (Silver medal) in the triathlon competition.

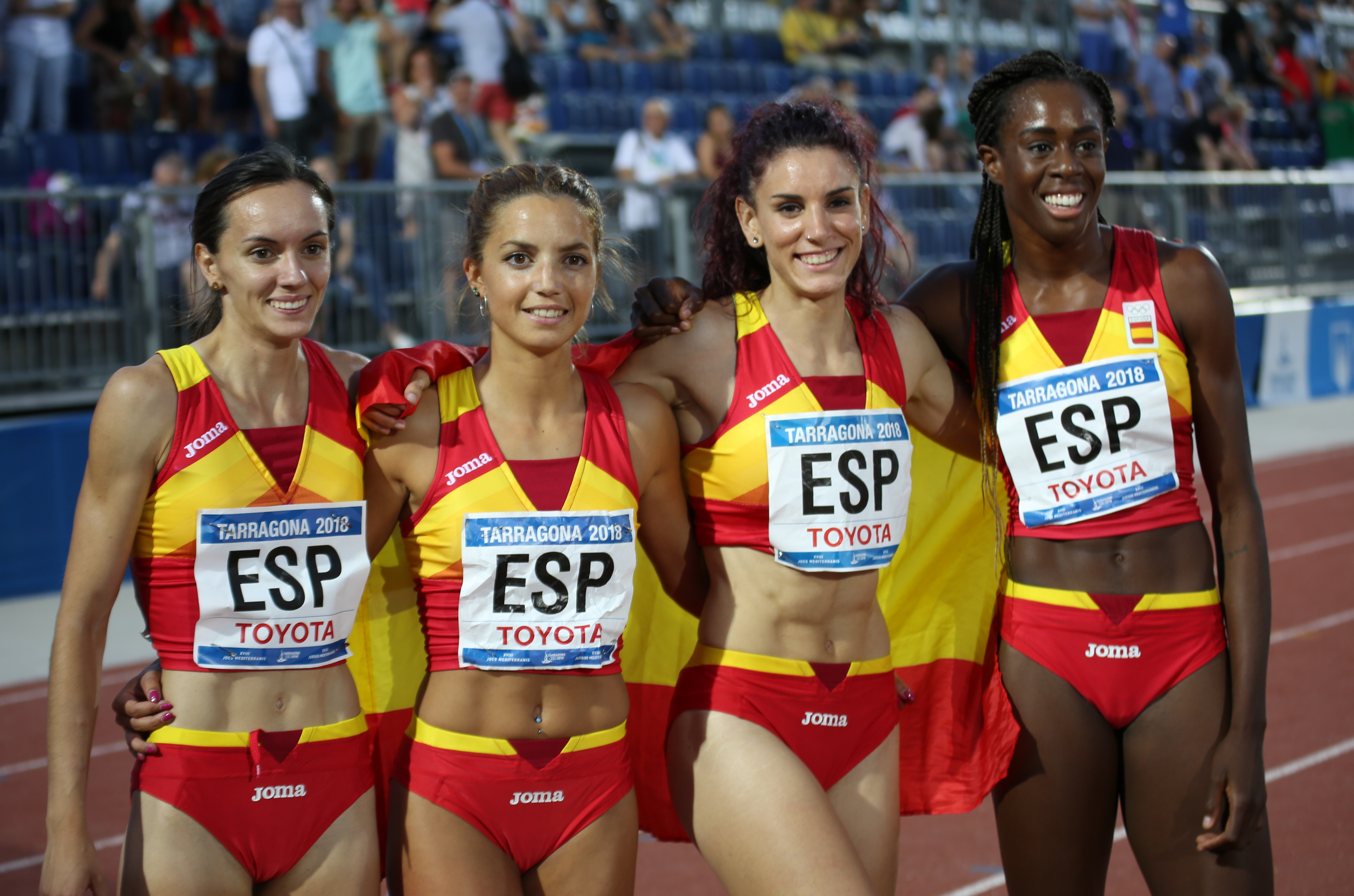
España en los relevos 4x400 femeninos de los Juegos del Mediterráneo 2018

Medal	Name	Sport	Event	Date
Gold	Jessica Vall	Swimming	Women's 200 metre breaststroke	June 23
Gold	Catalina Corró	Swimming	Women's 400 metre individual medley	June 23
Gold	Roi Rodríguez	Canoeing	Men's K1 500 metres	June 24
Gold	Teresa Portela	Canoeing	Women's K1 200 metres	June 24
Gold	Carlos Garrote	Canoeing	Men's K1 200 metres	June 24
Gold	Marcus Walz; Rodrigo Germade	Canoeing	Men's K2 500 metres	June 24
Gold	Antonio Bailón	Shooting	Men's trap	June 24
Gold	Mireia Belmonte	Swimming	Women's 200 metre individual medley	June 24
Gold	Jessica Vall	Swimming	Women's 100 metre breaststroke	June 24
Gold	Yulen Pereira	Fencing	Men's individual épée	June 24
Gold	Néstor Abad; Thierno Diallo; Nicolau Mir; Alberto Tallón; Rayderley Zapata	Artistic gymnastics	Men's team	June 24
Gold	Mireia Belmonte	Swimming	Women's 200 metre butterfly	June 25
Gold	Pablo Abián	Badminton	Men's individual	June 26
Gold	Rayderley Zapata	Artistic gymnastics	Men's floor	June 26
Gold	Lydia Valentín	Weightlifting	Women's −75 kg snatch	June 27
Gold	Lydia Valentín	Weightlifting	Women's −75 kg clean & jerk	June 27
Gold	Francisco Garrigós	Judo	Men's −60 kg	June 27
Gold	Julia Figueroa	Judo	Women's −48 kg	June 27
Gold	Mario Galiano	Golf	Men's individual	June 28
Gold	Iván Cantero; Mario Galiano; Álvaro Velasco	Golf	Men's team	June 28
Gold	Marta Sanz	Golf	Women's individual	June 28
Gold	Natalia Escuriola; Marta Sanz; Patricia Sanz	Golf	Women's team	June 28
Gold	Daniel Ros	Taekwondo	Men's +80 kg	June 28
Gold	María Bernabéu	Judo	Women's −70 kg	June 28
Gold	Nikoloz Sherazadishvili	Judo	Men's −90 kg	June 28
Gold	Joaquín Blanco	Sailing	Men's Laser Radial	June 29
Gold	Blanca Manchón	Sailing	Women's RS:X	June 29
Gold	Raúl Martínez	Taekwondo	Men's -80 kg	June 29
Gold	Jesús Tortosa	Taekwondo	Men's -58 kg	June 29
Gold	Spain national under-18 football team: Pascu; José Lara; Carlos Beitia; Nacho Díaz; Juan Cruz Díaz; Álvaro Fernández; Álvaro García; Hugo Guillamón; Sergio Gómez; Víctor Gómez; Roberto López; Juan Miranda; Mateu Morey; Aitor Paredes; Abel Ruiz; Mujaid Sadick; Oihan Sancet; Arnau Tenas	Football	Men's tournament	June 30
Gold	Gabriel Escobar	Boxing	Men's -52 kg	June 30
Gold	Javier Pérez	Taekwondo	Men's -68 kg	June 30
Gold	Belén Carro; Paula Soria	Beach volleyball	Women's tournament	June 30
Gold	Álvaro De Arriba	Athletics	Men's 800 metres	June 30
Gold	Spain women's national water polo team: Marta Bach; Anna Espar; Clara Espar; Laura Ester; Judith Forca; Maica García; Ana Gual; Paula Leiton; Helena Lloret; Beatriz Ortíz; Matilde Ortíz; Pili Peña; María Elena Sánchez	Waterpolo	Women's tournament	June 30
Gold	Nicolás Quijera	Athletics	Men's javelin throw	June 30
Gold	Galia Dvorak; María Xiao; Sofía Xuan Zhang	Table tennis	Women's team	June 30
Gold	Spain women's national handball team: Ainhoa Hernández; Alicia Fernández; Almudena Rodríguez; Amaia González de Garibay; Andrea De la Torre; Carmen Campos; Emma Boada; Ivet Musons; Jennifer Gutiérrez; Judith Sans; Lara González; Maitane Etxeberria; María Prieto O'Mullony; Mercedes Castellanos; Paula García; Paula Valdivia	Handball	Women's tournament	June 30
Silver	Anna Godoy	Triathlon	Women's sprint race	June 23
Silver	Antonio Serrat	Triathlon	Men's sprint race	June 23
Silver	Mireia Belmonte	Swimming	Women's 800 metre freestyle	June 23
Silver	Lidón Muñoz	Swimming	Women's 100 metre freestyle	June 23
Silver	Duane Da Rocha	Swimming	Women's 50 metre backstroke	June 23
Silver	Joan Ballester	Swimming	Men's 200 metre breaststroke	June 23
Silver	Marina García	Swimming	Women's 200 metre breaststroke	June 23
Silver	Hugo González	Swimming	Men's 200 metre individual medley	June 23
Silver	Alicia Marín; Mónica Galisteo; Nerea López	Archery	Women's team	June 24
Silver	Mónica Galisteo	Archery	Women's individual	June 24
Silver	Fátima Gálvez	Shooting	Women's trap	June 24
Silver	Jorge Díaz	Shooting	Men's 10 metre air rifle	June 24
Silver	Atenery Hernández	Weightlifting	Women's −53 kg snatch	June 24
Silver	Joan Lluis Pons	Swimming	Men's 400 metre individual medley	June 24
Silver	Melani Costa	Swimming	Women's 200 metre freestyle	June 24
Silver	Marina García	Swimming	Women's 100 metre breaststroke	June 24
Silver	Andrés Mata	Weightlifting	Men's −77 kg snatch	June 25
Silver	Andrés Mata	Weightlifting	Men's −77 kg clean & jerk	June 25
Silver	Lidón Muñoz	Swimming	Women's 50 metre freestyle	June 25
Silver	Hugo González	Swimming	Men's 200 metre backstroke	June 25
Silver	África Zamorano	Swimming	Women's 200 metre backstroke	June 25
Silver	David Levecq	Swimming	Men's 100 metre freestyle S10	June 25
Silver	Mireia Belmonte	Swimming	Women's 400 metre freestyle	June 25
Silver	Duane Da Rocha; Jessica Vall; Lidón Muñoz; Marta González	Swimming	Women's 4 × 100 metre medley relay	June 25
Silver	Beatriz Corrales	Badminton	Women's individual	June 26
Silver	Paula Raya	Artistic gymnastics	Women's uneven bars	June 26
Silver	Alberto Gaitero	Judo	Men's −66 kg	June 27
Silver	Ane Santesteban	Cycling	Women's road race	June 27
Silver	Juliet Itoya	Athletics	Women's long jump	June 27
Silver	Jesús Cantero	Table tennis	Men's individual	June 28
Silver	Lucas Búa	Athletics	Men's 400 metres	June 28
Silver	Marina Alabau	Sailing	Women's RS:X	June 29
Silver	Eva María Moral	Athletics	Women's 800 metres T54	June 29
Silver	Laia Flores; Marina Lizarazu; Nogaye Lo; Laura Quevedo	Basketball 3x3	Women's Tournament	June 29
Silver	Marta Galimany	Athletics	Women's half marathon	June 30
Silver	Youba Sissokho	Boxing	Men's -69 kg	June 30
Silver	Yidiel Contreras	Athletics	Men's 110 hurdles	June 30
Silver	Paula Sevilla; Estela García; María Isabel Pérez; Cristina Lara	Athletics	Women's 4 × 100 metre relay	June 30
Silver	Lucas Búa; Darwin Echeverry; David Jiménez; Mark Ujakpor	Athletics	Men's 4 × 400 metre relay	June 30
Silver	Spain men's national volleyball team: Augusto Renato Colito; Gabriel Del Carmén; Jorge Fernández; Miguel Ángel Fornes; Aharon Gámiz; Francisco Iribarne; Carlos Jiménez; Rubén Lorente; Víctor Rodríguez; Ángel Trinidad; Alejandro Vigil; Andrés Villena	Volleyball	Men's tournament	July 1
Bronze	Samy Ennkhaili	Karate	Men's -67 kg kumite	June 23
Bronze	Antonio Benito	Triathlon	Men's sprint race	June 23
Bronze	Josué Brachi	Weightlifting	Men's −62 kg snatch	June 23
Bronze	Cristina Ferrer	Karate	Women's -61 kg kumite	June 23
Bronze	Alex Castejón	Swimming	Men's 200 metre breaststroke	June 23
Bronze	Melani Costa; África Zamorano; Lidón Muñoz; Marta Cano	Swimming	Women's 4 × 200 metres freestyle relay	June 23
Bronze	Pablo Acha; Miguel Alvariño; Antonio Fernández	Archery	Men's team	June 24
Bronze	Pablo Acha	Archery	Men's individual	June 24
Bronze	Laura Palacio	Karate	Women's +68 kg kumite	June 24
Bronze	Marta González; Lidón Muñoz; Marta Cano; Melani Costa	Swimming	Women's 4 × 100 metres freestyle relay	June 24
Bronze	Alba Sánchez	Weightlifting	Women's −58 kg clean & jerk	June 24
Bronze	Marc Sánchez; Moritz Berg; Hugo González; Miguel Durán	Swimming	Men's 4 × 200 metres freestyle relay	June 24
Bronze	Helena Bonilla; Nora Fernández; Ana Pérez; Paula Raya; Cintia Rodríguez	Artistic gymnastics	Women's team	June 24
Bronze	Irene Martínez	Weightlifting	Women's −63 kg snatch	June 25
Bronze	Jessica Vall	Swimming	Women's 50 metre breaststroke	June 25
Bronze	Sarai Gascón	Swimming	Women's 100 metre freestyle S10	June 25
Bronze	Lucía Martín-Portugués	Fencing	Women's individual sabre	June 24
Bronze	Ana Pérez	Artistic gymnastics	Women's individual all-around	June 25
Bronze	Ilia Hernández	Weightlifting	Women's −69 kg clean & jerk	June 26
Bronze	Manuel Sánchez	Weightlifting	Men's −94 kg clean & jerk	June 26
Bronze	Taimuraz Friev	Wrestling	Men's −86 kg freestyle	June 26
Bronze	Cintia Rodríguez	Artistic gymnastics	Women's floor	June 26
Bronze	Néstor Abad	Artistic gymnastics	Men's horizontal bar	June 26
Bronze	Aintzane Gorría	Wrestling	Women's −50 kg freestyle	June 27
Bronze	Graciela Sánchez	Wrestling	Women's −57 kg freestyle	June 27
Bronze	Fátima Diame	Athletics	Women's long jump	June 27
Bronze	Marta Calvo	Taekwondo	Women's -57 kg	June 28
Bronze	Galia Dvorak	Table tennis	Women's individual	June 28
Bronze	Martina Reino	Sailing	Women's Laser Radial	June 29
Bronze	Joel Rodríguez	Sailing	Men's Laser Radial	June 29
Bronze	Johan Orozco	Boxing	Men's -64 kg	June 29
Bronze	Ángel Parra	Judo	Men's +100 kg	June 29
Bronze	Marina Bassols; Eva Guerrero	Tennis	Women's doubles	June 29
Bronze	Estela García	Athletics	Women's 200 m	June 29
Bronze	Fátima Diame	Athletics	Women's triple jump	June 29
Bronze	Ana Lozano	Athletics	Women's 5000 m	June 29
Bronze	Natalia De Miguel	Rowing	Women's lightweight single sculls	June 30
Bronze	Virginia Díaz	Rowing	Women's skiff	June 30
Bronze	Elena Loyo	Athletics	Women's half marathon	June 30
Bronze	Amaranta Fernández; Ángela Lobato	Beach volleyball	Women's tournament	June 30
Bronze	María José Muñóz; María José Pérez	Boules	Women's doubles	June 30
Bronze	Marta Pérez	Athletics	Women's 1500 m	June 30
Bronze	Laura Bueno; Herminia Parra; Carmen Sánchez; Aauri Bokesa	Athletics	Women's 4 × 400 metre relay	June 30
Bronze	Spain men's national handball team: Adria Figueras; Aitor Ariño; Aleix Gómez; Alejandro Costoya; Ángel Fernández; Ángel Montoro; Antonio Bazán; Arnau García; Daniel Dujshebaev; Ignacio Biosca; Imanol Garciandía; Iñaki Pecina; Iosu Goñi; Kauldi Odriozola; Marc Cañellas; Sergey Hernández	Handball	Men's tournament	July 1

== Archery ==
Men

Athlete	Event	Ranking round		Round of 64	Round of 32	Round of 16	Quarterfinals	Semifinals	Final / BM	
Athlete	Event	Score	Seed	Opposition Score	Opposition Score	Opposition Score	Opposition Score	Opposition Score	Opposition Score	Rank
Pablo Acha	Individual	667	3	Bye	Benahmed (ALG); W 6-0	Jimenez (FRA); W 7-1	Galiazzo (ITA); W 6-2	Strajhar (SLO); L 6-0	Gülaçar (TUR); W 7-3	3rd place, bronze medalist(s)
Miguel Alvariño	Individual	664	4	Bye	Beatovic (SRB); W 6-2	Tonelli (ITA); L 5-6	Did not advance			9
Antonio Fernández	Individual	645	12	Bye	Gülaçar (TUR); L 6-2	Did not advance				17
Miguel Alvariño; Antonio Fernández; Pablo Acha	Team	1976	1	—N/a		Bye	Cyprus (CYP); W 6-2	France (FRA); L 5-1	Italy (ITA); L 5-2	3rd place, bronze medalist(s)

Women

Athlete	Event	Ranking round		Round of 32	Round of 16	Quarterfinals	Semifinals	Final / BM	
Athlete	Event	Score	Seed	Opposition Score	Opposition Score	Opposition Score	Opposition Score	Opposition Score	Rank
Mónica Galisteo	Individual	650	4	Bye	Gkorila (GRE); W 6-2	Umer (SLO); W 6-2	Aktuna (TUR); W 6-5	Boari (ITA); L 7-1	2nd place, silver medalist(s)
Alicia Marín	Individual	657	3	Bye	Rogazy (FRA); W 7-1	López (ESP); W 6-0	Boari (ITA); L 7-1	Aktuna (TUR); L 6-4	4
Nerea López	Individual	622	11	Serraf (ALG); W 6-0	Coskun (TUR); W 6-0	Marín (ESP); L 6-0	Did not advance		8
Alicia Marín; Mónica Galisteo; Nerea López	Team	1929	3	—N/a		Cyprus (CYP); W 6-0	Italy (ITA); W 6-2	France (FRA); L 5-3	2nd place, silver medalist(s)

== Athletics ==
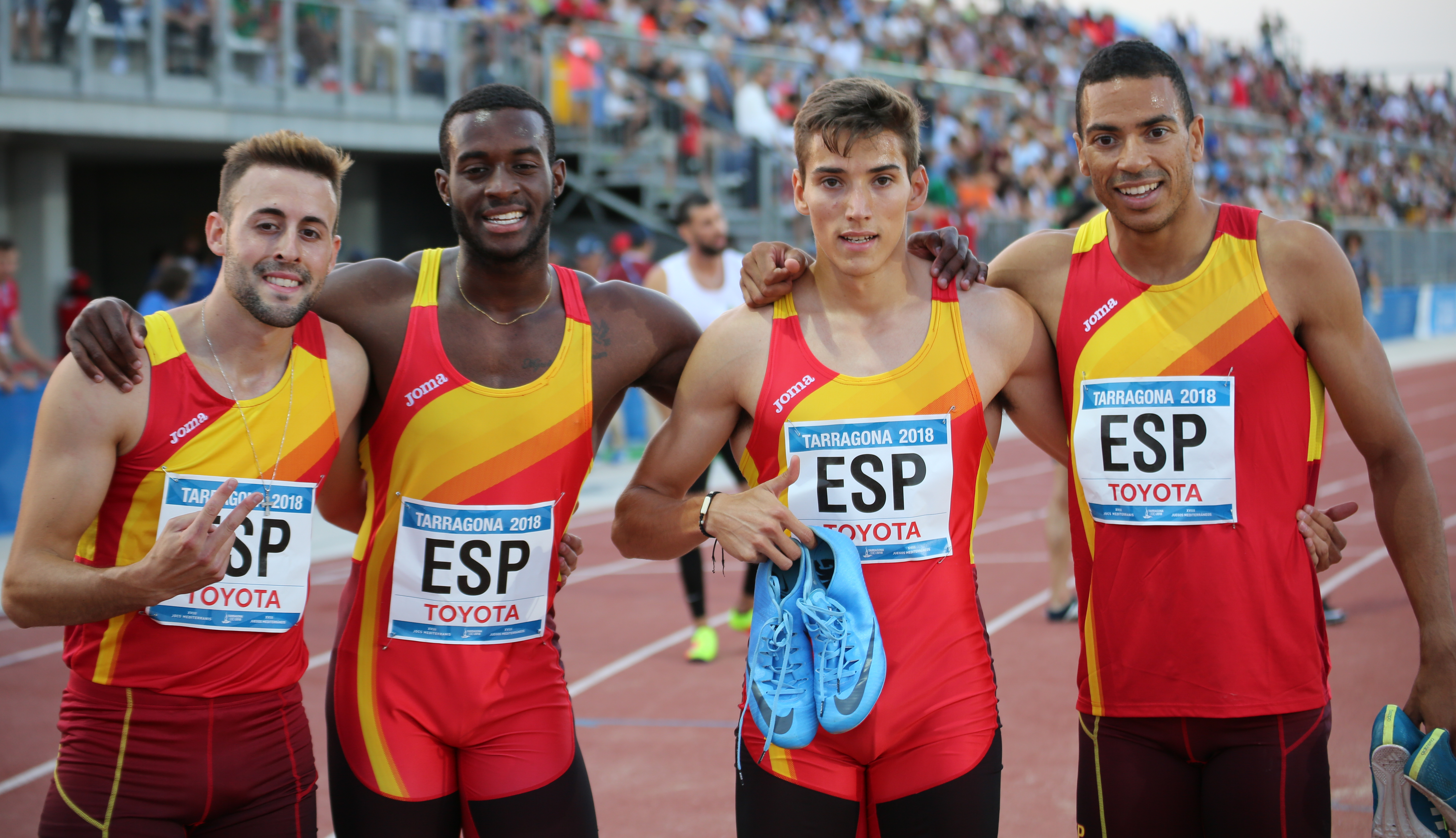
España en los relevos 4x400 en los Juegos del Mediterráneo 2018

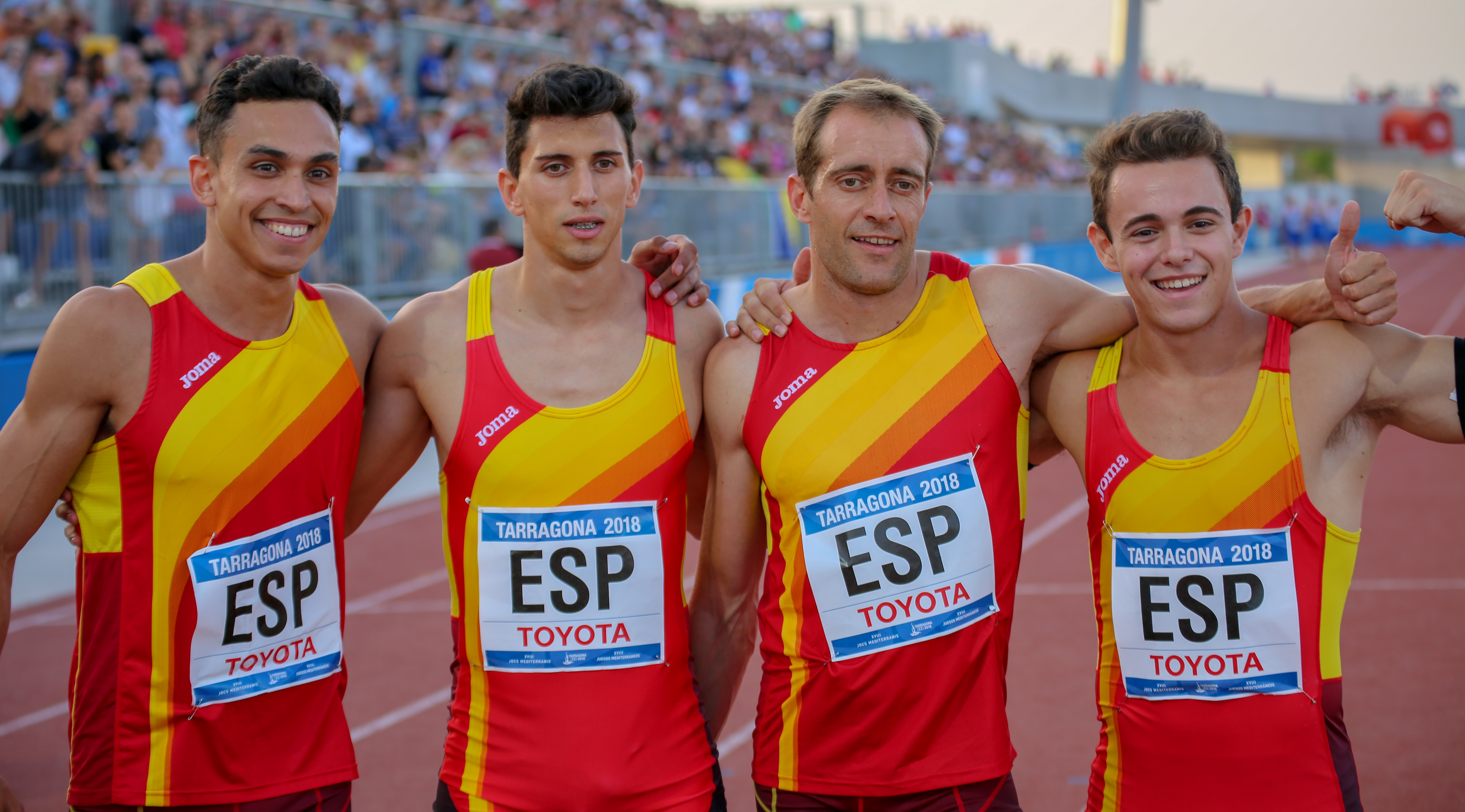
España en los relevos 4x100 en los Juegos del Mediterráneo 2018

Key

- Note – Ranks given for track events are within the athlete's heat only
- Q = Qualified for the next round
- q = Qualified for the next round as a fastest loser or, in field events, by position without achieving the qualifying target
- NR = National record
- N/A = Round not applicable for the event
- Bye = Athlete not required to compete in round

Men
Track & road events

Athlete	Event	Semifinal		Final	
Athlete	Event	Result	Rank	Result	Rank
Ángel David Rodríguez	100 m	10.64	4 Q	10.49	6
Arián Olmos Téllez	100 m	10.70	9	Did not advance	
Daniel Rodríguez	200 m	20.59	4 Q	20.79	4
Javier Troyano	200 m	21.21	12	Did not advance	
Lucas Búa	400 m	46.46	1 Q	45.91	2nd place, silver medalist(s)
Darwin Echeverry	400 m	46.88	7 q	46.89	8
Daniel Andújar	800 m	1:49.55	8 Q	1:48.72	5
Álvaro de Arriba	800 m	1:47.30	1 Q	1:47.43	1st place, gold medalist(s)
Marc Alcalá	1500 m	3:48.03	13	Did not advance	
Jesús Gómez	1500 m	3:45.75	9 Q	3:40.43	7
Antonio Abadía	5000 m	—N/a		13:56.74	4
Fernando Carro	5000 m	—N/a		13:57.26	5
Yidiel Contreras	110 m hurdles	—N/a		13.54	2nd place, silver medalist(s)
Javier Delgado	400 m hurdles	51.44	10	Did not advance	
Mark Ujakpor	400 m hurdles	50.84	8 q	51.23	8
Daniel Arce	3000 m steeplechase	—N/a		8:33.95	4
Eric Peñalver	3000 m steeplechase	—N/a		8:43.67	8
Javier Guerra	Half marathon	—N/a		1:05:19	8
Ayad Lamdassem	Half marathon	—N/a		DNF	-
Ángel David Rodríguez; Daniel Rodríguez; Arián Olmos Téllez; Javier Troyano; Daniel Cerdán^{Res}	4 × 100 m relay	—N/a		39.52	4
Lucas Búa; Darwin Echeverry; David Jiménez; Mark Ujakpor; Alberto Gavaldá^{Res}	4 × 400 m relay	—N/a		3:04.71	2nd place, silver medalist(s)

Field events

Athlete	Event	Qualification		Final	
Athlete	Event	Result	Rank	Result	Rank
Simón Siverio	High jump	—N/a		2.20	5
Jean Marie Okutu	Long jump	7.74	8 q	7.78	6
Hector Sántos	Long jump	7.80	4 q	7.48	10
Carlos Tobalina	Shot put	19.21	5 q	19.28	8
Borja Vivas	Shot put	17.98	13	Did not advance	
Frank Casañas	Discus throw	55.39	8 q	55.73	10
Lois Maikel Martínez	Discus throw	55.92	6 q	58.61	5
Odei Jainaga	Javelin throw	—N/a		63.51	8
Nicolás Quijera	Javelin throw	—N/a		75.13	1st place, gold medalist(s)

Women
Track & road events

Athlete	Event	Semifinal		Final	
Athlete	Event	Result	Rank	Result	Rank
Cristina Lara	100 m	11.72	6 Q	11.65	6
María Isabel Pérez	100 m	11.80	8 q	11.69	7
Estela García	200 m	23.22	3 Q	23.11	3rd place, bronze medalist(s)
Paula Sevilla	200 m	23.61	7 Q	23.34	5
Laura Bueno	400 m	53.15	9	Did not advance	
Herminia Parra	400 m	53.63	10	Did not advance	
Esther Guerrero	800 m	2:03.93	3 Q	2:03.35	4
Eva María Moral	800 m T54	—N/a			2nd place, silver medalist(s)
Solange Pereira	1500 m	—N/a		4:15.97	4
Marta Pérez	1500 m	—N/a		4:15.66	3rd place, bronze medalist(s)
Ana Lozano	5000 m	—N/a		16:00.17	3rd place, bronze medalist(s)
Teresa Errandonea	110 m hurdles	13.75	9	Did not advance	
Caridad Jerez	110 m hurdles	13.72	8 q	13.40	5
Irene Sánchez-Escribano	3000 m steeplechase	—N/a		9:37.86	4
Teresa Urbina	3000 m steeplechase	—N/a		10:06.26	11
Marta Galimany	Half marathon	—N/a		1:15:16	2nd place, silver medalist(s)
Elena Loyo	Half marathon	—N/a		1:16:20	3rd place, bronze medalist(s)
Estela García; Cristina Lara; María Isabel Pérez; Paula Sevilla; Nana Jacob^{Res}	4 × 100 m relay	—N/a		43.31	2nd place, silver medalist(s)
Aauri Lorena Bokesa; Laura Bueno; Herminia Parra; Carmen Sánchez; Ruth Peña^{Res}	4 × 400 m relay	—N/a		3:31.54	3rd place, bronze medalist(s)

Field events

Athlete	Event	Final	
Athlete	Event	Result	Rank
Maialen Axpe	Pole Vault	4.01	10
Mónica Clemente	Pole Vault	4.21	4
Juliet Itoya	Long jump	6.83	2nd place, silver medalist(s)
Fátima Diame	Long jump	6.68	3rd place, bronze medalist(s)
Fátima Diame	Triple jump	13.92	3rd place, bronze medalist(s)
Patricia Sarrapio	Triple jump	13.85	4
Sabina Asenjo	Discus throw	57.41	5
Berta Castells	Hammer throw	67.53	4
Laura Redondo	Hammer throw	63.89	5

== Badminton ==
Men

Athlete	Event	Round of 32	Round of 16	Quarterfinal	Semifinal	Final / BM	
Athlete	Event	Opposition Score	Opposition Score	Opposition Score	Opposition Score	Opposition Score	Rank
Pablo Abián	Men's singles	Bye	Nicolaou (CYP); W 11–21, 16-21	Atilano (POR); W 11–21, 14-21	Popov (FRA); W 18–21, 15-21	Corvée (FRA); W 21–23, 21–15, 21-17	1st place, gold medalist(s)
Luis Enrique Peñalver	Men's singles	Bye	Corvée (FRA); WO	Did not advance			
Javier Suárez; Alberto Zapico	Men's doubles	—N/a	Bye	Strobl/Osele (ITA); L 21–17, 15–21, 21-17	Did not advance		

Women

Athlete	Event	Round of 32	Round of 16	Quarterfinal	Semifinal	Final / BM	
Athlete	Event	Opposition Score	Opposition Score	Opposition Score	Opposition Score	Opposition Score	Rank
Beatriz Corrales	Women's singles	Bye	Batomene (FRA); W 21–11, 21-9	Salehar (SLO); W 21–6, 21-12	Demirbağ (TUR); W 21–19, 21-14	Yiğit (TUR); L 19–21, 21-23	2nd place, silver medalist(s)
Sara Peñalver	Women's singles	Gonçalves (POR); W 21–12, 21-10	Salehar (SLO); W 21–10, 21-18	Yiğit (TUR); L 21–15, 14–21, 17-21	Did not advance		
Elena Fernández; Lorena Uslé	Women's doubles	—N/a	Tzika/Sotirioue (GRE); W 21–12, 21-12	Christodoulou/Zintsidou (CYP); W 23–21, 21-19	Ercetin/İnci (TUR); L 17–21, 11-21	Salehar/Salehar (SLO); L 21–13, 15–21, 18-21	4

== Basketball 3X3 ==
=== Men's tournament ===
Athlete	Event	Group matches			Quarterfinals	Semifinals	Final / BM	
Athlete	Event	Opposition Score	Opposition Score	Rank	Opposition Score	Opposition Score	Opposition Score	Rank
Nil Brià; Daniel De la Rua; Adnan Omeragic; Xabier Oroz	Men's Tournament	Slovenia (SLO); L 19–17 (OT)	Greece (GRE); L 18–20	3	Did not advance			

=== Women's tournament ===
Athlete	Event	Group matches					Semifinals	Final / BM	
Athlete	Event	Opposition Score	Opposition Score	Opposition Score	Opposition Score	Rank	Opposition Score	Opposition Score	Rank
Laia Flores; Marina Lizarazu; Nogaye Lo; Laura Quevedo	Women's Tournament	Andorra (AND); W 22-5	Greece (GRE); W 21–14	Portugal (POR); W 7–8	Slovenia (SLO); W 19–11	1 Q	Serbia (SRB); W 22–4	France (FRA); L 8–10	2nd place, silver medalist(s)

== Beach volleyball ==
Athlete	Event	Preliminary round	Standing	1/8 Finals	Quarterfinals	Semifinals	Final / BM	
Athlete	Event	Opposition Score	Standing	Opposition Score	Opposition Score	Opposition Score	Opposition Score	Rank
Christian García; Raúl Mesa	Men's	Tizit/Hamadache (ALG) W 2-0; Bozenk/Pokeršnik (SLO) W 2-0	1 Q	Boussaid/Souadi (ALG); W 21–18, 21-11	Mermer/Urlu (TUR); L 21–16, 15–21, 14-16	Did not advance		
Alejandro Huerta; Javier Huerta	Men's	Boussaid/Souadi (ALG) W 2-0; Ferry/Ferry (MON) W 2-0; Giginoglu/Göğtepe (TUR) L 0-2	2 Q	Bozenk/Pokeršnik (SLO); W 21–16, 17–21, 15-10	Aye/Krou (FRA); L 21–17, 21-18	Did not advance		
Belén Carro; Paula Soria	Women's	Coelho/Paquette (POR) W 2-0; Raicevic/Savovic (SRB) W 2-0; Raicevic/Savovic (FRA) W 2-0	1 Q	—N/a	Vence/Nezir (TUR); W 21–9, 21-19	Fernández/Lobato (ESP); W 21–23, 21–15, 15-13	Chamereau/Jupiter (FRA); W 21–16, 18–21, 15-11	1st place, gold medalist(s)
Amaranta Fernández; Ángela Lobato	Women's	Bounser/Mehani (ALG) W 2-0; Yurtsever/Özsoy (TUR) W 2-0; Placette/Richard (ITA) W 2-1	1 Q	—N/a	Jančar/Kotnik (SLO); W 21–10, 21-15	Carro/Soria (ESP); L 23–21, 15–21, 13-15	Traballi/Zuccarelli (ITA); W WO	3rd place, bronze medalist(s)

== Boules ==
Lyonnaise

Athlete	Event	Heats				Semifinals	Final / BM	
Athlete	Event	Heat 1	Heat 2	Total	Rank	Opposition Score	Opposition Score	Rank
Daniel Guillen	Men's precision throw	14	14	28	5	Did not advance		
Cristina Soler	Women's precision throw	8	11	19	6	Did not advance		

Pétanque

Athlete	Event	Preliminary round				Quarterfinals	Semifinals	Final / BM	
Athlete	Event	Round 1	Rank	Round 2	Rank	Opposition Score	Opposition Score	Opposition Score	Rank
Marco Antonio Galindo	Men's precision throw	28	14	Did not advance					
Manuel Higinio Romero	Men's precision throw	50	2 Q	BYE		Le Boursicaud (FRA); L 48-50	Did not advance		
María José Muñóz	Women's precision throw	21	8 q	60	2 Q	Celik (TUR); L 29-22	Did not advance		
María José Pérez	Women's precision throw	19	7 q	51	4 Q	Beji (TUR); L 40-22	Did not advance		

Athlete	Event	Group stage					Semifinals	Final / BM	
Athlete	Event	Opposition Score	Opposition Score	Opposition Score	Opposition Score	Rank	Opposition Score	Opposition Score	Rank
Marco Antonio Galindo; Manuel Higinio Romero	Men's doubles	Andorra (AND); W 13–3	Morocco (MAR); L 7–13	Italy (ITA); L 5–13	Monaco (MON); W 13–7	3	Did not advance		
María José Muñóz; María José Pérez	Women's doubles	Turkey (TUR); L 12–11		Portugal (POR); W 9–8		2 Q	Tunisia (TUN); L 13–5	Turkey (TUR); W 5–12	3rd place, bronze medalist(s)

== Boxing ==
Athlete	Event	Round of 16	Quarterfinals	Semifinals	Final	
Athlete	Event	Opposition Result	Opposition Result	Opposition Result	Opposition Result	Rank
Gabriel Escobar	Flyweight	Bye	Ciftci (TUR); W 5-0	Janjić (SRB); W 5-0	Al Masri (SYR); W 5-0	1st place, gold medalist(s)
José Quiles	Bantamweight	Kachfi (MAR); L 2-3	Did not advance			
Salvador Jiménez	Lightweight	Bye	Shili (TUN); L 2-3	Did not advance		
Johan Orozco	Light welterweight	Mešanović (BIH); W 5-0	Mejri (TUN); W 5-0	Erdemir (TUR); L 0-5	Did not advance	3rd place, bronze medalist(s)
Youba Sissokho	Welterweight	Bensaid (ALG); W 3-2	Baković (SLO); W 5-0	Sipal (TUR); W WO	Mohamed (EGY); L 1-4	2nd place, silver medalist(s)
Miguel Cuadrado	Middleweight	Bye	Bamba (FRA); L 2-3	Did not advance		
Alejandro Camacho	Light heavyweight	Houmri (ALG); L 1-4	Did not advance			
Ayoub Ghadfa	Super heavyweight	Bye	Firisse (MAR); L KO	Did not advance		

== Canoeing ==
Men

Athlete	Event	Heats		Semifinals		Final	
Athlete	Event	Time	Rank	Time	Rank	Time	Rank
Carlos Garrote	K-1 200 m	35.530	1 FA	Bye		34.148	1st place, gold medalist(s)
Roi Rodríguez	K-1 500 m	1:39.053	1 FA	Bye		1:38.881	1st place, gold medalist(s)
Rodrigo Germade; Marcus Walz	K-2 500 m	1:31.178	1 FA	Bye		1:27.907	1st place, gold medalist(s)

Women

Athlete	Event	Heats		Semifinals		Final	
Athlete	Event	Time	Rank	Time	Rank	Time	Rank
Teresa Portela	K-1 200 m	40.941	1 FA	Bye		40.140	1st place, gold medalist(s)
Teresa Portela	K-1 500 m	1:52.998	1 FA	Bye		1:56.021	4

Legend: FA = Qualify to final (medal); FB = Qualify to final B (non-medal)

== Cycling ==
Men

Athlete	Event	Time	Rank
Iñigo Elosegui	Men's road race	3:43:54	12
Antonio Gómez	Men's road race	3:51:24	24
Óscar Hernández	Men's road race	3:57:36	30
Manuel Peñalver	Men's road race	DNF	–
Óscar Pelegrí	Men's road race	3:57:36	32
Juan Ignacio Pérez	Men's road race	3:57:33	28
Mario González	Men's road race	3:43:50	5
Mario González	Men's time trial	31:34	7
Álvaro Trueba	Men's road race	3:43:54	11
Álvaro Trueba	Men's time trial	31:50	9

Women

Athlete	Event	Time	Rank
Alicia González	Women's road race	2:40:00	5
Sheyla Gutiérrez	Women's road race	2:43:22	11
Eider Merino	Women's road race	2:40:18	8
Sofia Rodríguez	Women's road race	2:52:40	19
Ane Santesteban	Women's road race	2:38:47	2nd place, silver medalist(s)
Sara Martín	Women's road race	2:47:45	16
Sara Martín	Women's time trial	26:18	6

== Equestrian ==
=== Jumping ===
Athlete	Horse	Event	Qualification				Final				Total	
Athlete	Horse	Event	Round 1	Round 2	Total	Rank	Round A	Round B	Jump Off		Total	
Athlete	Horse	Event	Penalties	Penalties	Total	Rank	Penalties	Penalties	Penalties	Total	Penalties	Rank
Eduardo Álvarez Aznar	Fidux	Individual	0	4	4	10	AB		Did not advance		DNF	-
Paola Amilibia	Julieta	Individual	4	1	5	20	AB		Did not advance		DNF	-
Pilar Cordon	Grand Cru	Individual	0	0	0	1	0	1	Did not advance		1	6
Gerardo Menendez	Costello DC	Individual	0	4	4	10	0	4	Did not advance		8	11
Eduardo Álvarez Aznar; Paola Amilibia; Pilar Cordon; Gerardo Menendez	See above	Team	—N/a				0	5	Did not advance		5	4

== Fencing ==
Men

Athlete	Event	Group stage		Round of 16	Quarterfinal	Semifinal	Final / BM	
Athlete	Event	Pool Scores	Rank	Opposition Score	Opposition Score	Opposition Score	Opposition Score	Rank
Yulen Pereira	Individual épée	Pizzo (ITA) L 4-5; Mahmoud (EGY) W 4-3; Gally (FRA) W 5-3; Codeço (POR) L 2-5	3 Q	Ibáñez (ESP); W 15-9	Codeço (POR); W 15-9	Gally (FRA); W 10-15	Canonne (FRA); W 15-14	1st place, gold medalist(s)
Álvaro Ibáñez	Individual épée	Cuomo (ITA) W 5-1; Canonne (FRA) L 4-5; Kavvadias (GRE) W 5-2; Candeias (POR) L 3-4	3 Q	Pereira (ESP); L 15-9	Did not advance			

Women

Athlete	Event	Group stage		Round of 16	Quarterfinal	Semifinal	Final / BM	
Athlete	Event	Pool Scores	Rank	Opposition Score	Opposition Score	Opposition Score	Opposition Score	Rank
Dóra Kiskapusi	Individual épée	Ehab (EGY) W 4-3; Jacques-André-Coquin (FRA) W 5-3; Marzani (ITA) W 5-3; Jukić (CRO) L 2-3; Bonito (POR) L 4-5	1 Q	Sel (SRB); W 15-7	Marzani (ITA); L 8-15	Did not advance		
Alejandra Cisneros	Individual épée	Rembi (FRA) L 0-5; Foietta (ITA) L 5-2; Sidiropoulou (GRE) L 2-5; Mavrikiou (CYP) W 5-4; Sel (SRB) W 4-5; Tannous (LBN) W 5-0	4 Q	Jukić (CRO); W 15-13	Rembi (FRA); L 8-15	Did not advance		
Lucía Martín-Portugués	Individual sabre	Gkountoura (GRE) W 5-1; Erbil (TUR) W 5-3; Balzer (FRA) L 3-5; Ciaraglia (ITA) W 5-2	1 Q	Bye	Rifkiss (FRA); W 15-11	Besbes (TUN); L 7-15	Did not advance	3rd place, bronze medalist(s)
Araceli Navarro	Individual sabre	Besbes (TUN) L 2-5; Rifkiss (FRA) L 2-5; Georgiadou (GRE) L 1-5; Shchukla (TUR) L 5-1; Mormile (ITA) W 5-2	5 Q	Erbil (TUR); W 10-15	Besbes (TUN); L 10-15	Did not advance		
María Mariño	Individual foil	De Costanzo (ITA) L 0-5; Elsharkawy (EGY) W 5-2; Mienville (FRA) L 3-5; Kontochristopoulou (GRE) W 5-1; Güneş (TUR) W 5-0; Shaito (LBN) W 5-4	2 Q	Mohamed (EGY); W 15-10	Mienville (FRA); L 15-10	Did not advance		
María Teresa Díaz	Individual foil	Boubakri (TUN) L 1-5; Cipressa (ITA) L 4-5; Karamete (TUR) W 5-4; Mohamed (EGY) W 5-4; Mpah-Njanga (FRA) L 1-5; Nogueira (POR) W 5-2	4 Q	Cipressa (ITA); L 13-15	Did not advance			

== Football ==
Team

- Pascu
- José Lara
- Carlos Beitia
- Nacho Díaz
- Juan Cruz
- Álvaro Fernández Calvo
- Álvaro García Segovia
- Hugo Guillamón
- Sergio Gómez
- Víctor Gómez
- Roberto López
- Juan Miranda
- Mateu Morey
- Aitor Paredes
- Abel Ruiz
- Mujaid Sadick
- Oihan Sancet
- Arnau Tenas

Athlete	Event	Group matches			Semifinals	Final / BM	
Athlete	Event	Opposition Score	Opposition Score	Rank	Opposition Score	Opposition Score	Rank
Spain (ESP)	Men's tournament	Algeria (ALG); W 4–1	Bosnia and Herzegovina (BIH); W 18–20	1 Q	Morocco (MAR); W 2–1	Italy (ITA); W 3–2	1st place, gold medalist(s)

== Golf ==
Athlete	Event	Round 1	Round 2	Round 3	Round 4	Total		
Athlete	Event	Score	Score	Score	Score	Score	Par	Rank
Iván Cantero	Men's individual	71	72	72	74	289	+1	7
Mario Galiano	Men's individual	69	66	68	69	272	−16	1st place, gold medalist(s)
Álvaro Velasco	Men's individual	71	72	71	74	288	Par	5
Iván Cantero; Mario Galiano; Álvaro Velasco	Men's team	71; 69; ~~71~~	72; 66; ~~72~~	~~72~~; 68; 71	74; 69; ~~74~~	560	−16	1st place, gold medalist(s)
Natalia Escurriola	Women's individual	72	71	69	76	288	Par	4
Marta Sanz	Women's individual	69	75	72	68	284	−4	1st place, gold medalist(s)
Patricia Sanz	Women's individual	70	75	75	73	293	+5	8
Natalia Escurriola; Marta Sanz; Patricia Sanz	Women's team	~~72~~; 69; 70	71; 75; ~~75~~	69; 72; ~~75~~	~~76~~; 68; 73	567	−9	1st place, gold medalist(s)

== Gymnastics ==
=== Artistic ===
Men
Team

Athlete	Event	Final							
Athlete	Event	Apparatus						Total	Rank
Athlete	Event	F	PH	R	V	PB	HB	Total	Rank
Néstor Abad	Team	14.500 Q	13.750 Q	14.300 Q	14.250	14.450 Q	14.350 Q	85.600	1 Q
Thierno Diallo	Team	—N/a	12.600	—N/a		13.450	11.900	-	-
Nicolau Mir	Team	13.850	12.850	13.850	13.625 Q	14.300 Q	13.550	81.400	9 Q
Alberto Tallón	Team	14.150	10.550	14.300 Q	14.450	13.400	13.300	80.150	11
Rayderley Zapata	Team	14.300 Q	—N/a	13.900	—N/a	—N/a	—N/a	-	-
Total	Team	42.950	39.200	42.500	42.500	42.200	41.200	250.550	1st place, gold medalist(s)

Individual

Athlete	Event	Final							
Athlete	Event	Apparatus						Total	Rank
Athlete	Event	F	PH	R	V	PB	HB	Total	Rank
Néstor Abad	All-around	12.550	13.450	14.000	14.000	14.250	14.050	82.300	5
Nicolau Mir	All-around	13.050	9.700	13.750	14.650	13.700	13.350	78.200	11

Apparatus

Athlete	Event	Total	Rank
Néstor Abad	Floor	13.200	7
Rayderley Zapata	Floor	14.500	1st place, gold medalist(s)
Néstor Abad	Pommel horse	14.033	6
Néstor Abad	Rings	13.866	5
Alberto Tallón	Rings	13.766	6
Nicolau Mir	Vault	13.066	8
Néstor Abad	Parallel bars	14.366	5
Nicolau Mir	Parallel bars	14.066	6
Néstor Abad	Horizontal bar	14.033	3rd place, bronze medalist(s)

Women
Team

Athlete	Event	Qualification					
Athlete	Event	Apparatus				Total	Rank
Athlete	Event	V	UB	BB	F	Total	Rank
Helena Bonilla	Team	13.350	11.750	11.350	11.700	48.150	8 Q
Nora Fernández	Team	14.000	11.700	—N/a	—N/a	-	-
Ana Pérez	Team	13.400	13.500 Q	12.750 Q	12.000	51.650	3 Q
Paula Raya	Team	—N/a	12.800 Q	11.550	12.000	-	-
Cintia Rodríguez	Team	13.050	—N/a	12.050	12.400 Q	-	-
Total	Team	37.950	40.850	36.350	36.400	151.550	3rd place, bronze medalist(s)

Individual

Athlete	Event	Qualification					
Athlete	Event	Apparatus				Total	Rank
Athlete	Event	V	UB	BB	F	Total	Rank
Helena Bonilla	All-around						9
Ana Pérez	All-around						3rd place, bronze medalist(s)

Apparatus

Athlete	Event	Total	Rank
Ana Pérez	Uneven Bars	12.433	5
Paula Raya	Uneven Bars	12.700	2nd place, silver medalist(s)
Ana Pérez	Balance beam	12.666	4
Cintia Rodríguez	Floor	12.466	3rd place, bronze medalist(s)

=== Rhythmic ===
Athlete	Event	Qualification						Final					
Athlete	Event	Hoop	Ball	Clubs	Ribbon	Total	Rank	Hoop	Ball	Clubs	Ribbon	Total	Rank
Polina Berezina	All-around	14.350	15.350	15.700	13.400	58.800	5 Q	14.650	15.250	14.900	14.250	59.050	4
Sara Llana	All-around	13.850	12.950	15.250	13.850	55.900	6 Q	15.500	15.050	13.000	13.600	57.150	7

== Handball ==
Men's tournament

- Adriá Figueras
- Aitor Ariño
- Aleix Gómez
- Alejandro Costoya
- Ángel Fernández
- Ángel Montoro
- Antonio Bazán
- Arnau García
- Daniel Dujshebaev
- Ignacio Biosca
- Imanol Garciandía
- Iñaki Pecina
- Iosu Goñi
- Kauldi Odriozola
- Marc Cañellas
- Sergey Hernández

Athlete	Event	Group matches			Quarterfinals	Semifinals	Final / BM	
Athlete	Event	Opposition Score	Opposition Score	Rank	Opposition Score	Opposition Score	Opposition Score	Rank
Spain (ESP)	Men's tournament	Greece (GRE); W 46–17	Portugal (POR); W 34–22	1 Q	Serbia (SRB); W 35–25	Croatia (CRO); L 31(OT)–29	Turkey (TUR); W 30–19	3rd place, bronze medalist(s)

Women's tournament

- Ainhoa Hernández
- Alicia Fernández
- Almudena Rodríguez
- Amaia González de Garibay
- Andrea De la Torre
- Carmen Campos
- Emma Boada
- Ivet Musons
- Jennifer Gutiérrez
- Judith Sans
- Lara González
- Maitane Etxeberria
- María Prieto O'Mullony
- Mercedes Castellanos
- Paula García
- Paula Valdivia

Athlete	Event	Group matches					Semifinals	Final / BM	
Athlete	Event	Opposition Score	Opposition Score	Opposition Score	Opposition Score	Rank	Opposition Score	Opposition Score	Rank
Spain (ESP)	Women's tournament	Slovenia (SLO); W 29–17	Greece (GRE); W 27–12	Portugal (POR); W 32–15	Italy (ITA); W 28–21	1 Q	Macedonia (MKD); W 28–21	Montenegro (MNE); L 27–23	1st place, gold medalist(s)

== Judo ==
Men

Athlete	Event	Round of 16	Quarterfinals	Semifinals	Repechage 1	Repechage 2	Final / BM	
Athlete	Event	Opposition Result	Opposition Result	Opposition Result	Opposition Result	Opposition Result	Opposition Result	Rank
Francisco Garrigós	−60 kg	Bye	Florimont (FRA); W 100–0	Bassou (MAR); W 100-0	Bye		Dhouibi (TUN); W 100–0	1st place, gold medalist(s)
Alberto Gaitero	−66 kg	Bye	Zadro (BIH); W 100–0	Abdelmawgoud (EGY); W 10–0	Bye		Lombardo (ITA); L 0–10	2nd place, silver medalist(s)
Javier Ramírez	−73 kg	Fernandes (POR); W 10–0	Gjakova (KOS); L 0–100	Did not advance	Bye	Kourtides (CYP); W 100–10	Basile (ITA); L 0–10	5
Alfonso Urquiza	−81 kg	Djalo (FRA); W 110–10	Albayrak (TUR); W 10–0	Ben Ammar (TUN); L 0–100	Bye		Egutidze (POR); L 0–10	5
Nikoloz Sherazadishvili	−90 kg	Bye	Efemgil (TUR); W 100–10	Mungai (SRB); W 100–10	Bye		Majdov (SRB); W 110–10	1st place, gold medalist(s)
Pedro Jiménez	-100 kg	Pantić (MNE); L 0–10	Did not advance					
Ángel Parra	+100 kg	Gadeau (MON); W 100–0	Jaballah (TUN); W 100–0	D'Arco (ITA); L 0–10	Bye		Dragič (SLO); W 100–0	3rd place, bronze medalist(s)

Women

Athlete	Event	Round of 16	Quarterfinals	Semifinals	Repechage 1	Repechage 2	Final / BM	
Athlete	Event	Opposition Result	Opposition Result	Opposition Result	Opposition Result	Opposition Result	Opposition Result	Rank
Julia Figueroa	−48 kg	Bye	Chakir (MAR); W 100-0	Milani (ITA); W 100-0	Bye		Nikolić (SRB); W 100-0	1st place, gold medalist(s)
Ana Pérez Box	−52 kg	Rexhepi (MKD); W 100-0	Krasniqi (KOS); L 0-100	Did not advance	—N/a	Moussa (ALG); W 100-0	Gneto (SRB); L 0-10	5
Jaione Equiosain	−57 kg	Bye	Halata (ALG); W 100-10	Boi (ITA); L 0-110	Bye		Gneto (SRB); L 0-100	5
Isabel Puché	−63 kg	Bye	Katipoğlu (TUR); L 0-10	Did not advance	Bye	Deketer (FRA); L 0-10	Did not advance	7
María Bernabéu	−70 kg	Bye	Bellakehal (ALG); W 100-0	Samardžić (BIH); W 100-0	Bye		Paissoni (ITA); W 100-0	1st place, gold medalist(s)
Laia Talarn	−78 kg	—N/a	Kuka (KOS); L 0-100	Did not advance	Bye	Mzougui (TUN); W 100-0	Sampaio (POR); L 0-10	5
Sara Álvarez	+78 kg	—N/a	Šutalo (CRO); W 110-10	Sayit (TUR); L 0-100	Bye		Asselah (ALG); L 0-100	5

== Karate ==
Men

Athlete	Event	Round of 16	Quarterfinals	Semifinals	Repechage	Final / BM	
Athlete	Event	Opposition Result	Opposition Result	Opposition Result	Opposition Result	Opposition Result	Rank
Victor Cobles	−60 kg	Lopes (FRA); L 0-3	Did not advance				
Samy Ennkhaili	−67 kg	Railic (SLO); W 4-0	Garin (FRA); L 1-1	—N/a	Bouakel (ALG); W 3-1	Maresca (ITA); W 1-0	3rd place, bronze medalist(s)
Rodrigo Ibáñez	−75 kg	Eltemur (TUR); L 4-0	—N/a		Younis (EGY); W 8-0	Bouabaoub (ALG); L 2-0	5
Pablo Arenas	−84 kg	Cvrkota (SRB); L 1-0	Did not advance				
Babacar Seck	+84 kg	Kaptan (TUR); L 3-3	Did not advance				

Women

Athlete	Event	Round of 16	Quarterfinals	Semifinals	Repechage	Final / BM	
Athlete	Event	Opposition Result	Opposition Result	Opposition Result	Opposition Result	Opposition Result	Rank
Rocío Sánchez	−50 kg	Bye	Arapoglu (TUR); L 0-0	Did not advance			
Carlota Fernández	−55 kg	Bye	Djedra (ALG); W 5-2	Yakan (TUR); L 0-2	—N/a	Cardin (ITA); L 0-3	5
Cristina Ferrer	−61 kg	Sadini (MAR); W 1-1	Draou (ALG); W 5-1	Lofty (EGY); L 0-3	—N/a	Rama (KOS); W 1-0	3rd place, bronze medalist(s)
Cristina Vizcaino	−68 kg	Mohamed (EGY); L 0-4	Did not advance				
Laura Palacio	+68 kg	Bye	Stylianou (CYP); W 1-0	Garcia (FRA); L 1-3	—N/a	Bektas (BIH); W 3-1	3rd place, bronze medalist(s)

== Rowing ==
Men

Athlete	Event	Heats		Repechage		Semifinal		Final	
Athlete	Event	Time	Rank	Time	Rank	Time	Rank	Time	Rank
Alejandro Vera	Lightweight single sculls	3:27.933	3	3:32.976	1 Q	3:28.704	4 QFB	3:36.033	8
Rubén García	Single sculls	3:30.926	4	3:36.356	3 QFB	—N/a		3:34.340	6
Adrià Mitjavila; Patricio Rojas	Lightweight double sculls	3:01.634	2 QFA	Bye		—N/a		3:06.384	4
Rubén Padilla; David Prada	Double sculls	3:15.350	5	3:10.458	1 QFA	—N/a		3:05.744	4

Women

Athlete	Event	Heats		Repechage		Final	
Athlete	Event	Time	Rank	Time	Rank	Time	Rank
Natalia de Miguel	Lightweight single sculls	3:44.048	4	3:59.822	1 QFA	3:52.830	3rd place, bronze medalist(s)
Virginia Díaz	Single sculls	3:41.441	2 QFA	Bye		3:50.468	3rd place, bronze medalist(s)

== Sailing ==
Men

Athlete	Event	Race											Net points	Final rank
Athlete	Event	1	2	3	4	5	6	7	8	9	10	M*	Net points	Final rank
Juan Manuel Moreno	RS:X	6	6	6	5	6	5	3	7	(13); DNF	5	6	55	6
Iván Pastor	RS:X	5	4	2	4	5	4	6	3	4	3	(8)	40	5
Joaquín Blanco	Laser	2	2	3	2	7	2	4	4	3	4	(16)	22	1st place, gold medalist(s)
Joel Rodríguez	Laser	8	1	4	4	(10)	9	2	8	5	7	4	52	3rd place, bronze medalist(s)

Women

Athlete	Event	Race											Net points	Final rank
Athlete	Event	1	2	3	4	5	6	7	8	9	10	M*	Net points	Final rank
Marina Alabau	RS:X	3	5	4	4	4	2	4	5	1	3	(6)	33	2nd place, silver medalist(s)
Blanca Manchón	RS:X	1	2	3	1	3	(5)	1	4	3	2	1	21	1st place, gold medalist(s)
Martina Reino	Laser Radial	5	4	3	5	4	(16); RET	5	7	2	3	2	40	3rd place, bronze medalist(s)

== Shooting ==
Men

Athlete	Event	Qualification		Final	
Athlete	Event	Points	Rank	Points	Rank
Pablo Carrera	10 m air pistol	580	2 QF	112.7	8
Rafael Sánchez	10 m air pistol	569	10	Did not advance	
Jorge Díaz	10 m air rifle	618.9	5 QF	247.2	2nd place, silver medalist(s)
Javier López	10 m air rifle	609.4	13	Did not advance	
Antonio Bailón	Trap	121	1 QF	47	1st place, gold medalist(s)
Alberto Fernández	Trap	118	9	Did not advance	

Women

Athlete	Event	Qualification		Final	
Athlete	Event	Points	Rank	Points	Rank
Gloria Fernández	10 m air pistol	552	14	Did not advance	
Sonia Franquet	10 m air pistol	559	9	Did not advance	
Nuria Bonet	10 m air rifle	623.8	4 QF	119.9	8
Paula Grande	10 m air rifle	619.1	9	Did not advance	
Fátima Gálvez	Trap	114	2 QF	41	2nd place, silver medalist(s)
Beatriz Martínez	Trap	109	9	Did not advance	

== Swimming ==
Men

Athlete	Event	Heat		Final	
Athlete	Event	Time	Rank	Time	Rank
Oskitz Aguilar	100 m freestyle	50.18	8 q	50.21	8
Antonio Arroyo	1500 m freestyle	—N/a		15:32.11	7
Joan Ballester	50 m breaststroke	29.73	16	Did not advance	
Joan Ballester	100 m breaststroke	1:03.51	14	Did not advance	
Joan Ballester	200 m breaststroke	2:15.06	3 q	2:13.48	2nd place, silver medalist(s)
Moritz Berg	100 m freestyle	49.84	6 q	49.79	7
Sergio Campos	50 m backstroke	26.03	7 q	26.06	6
Alex Castejón	200 m breaststroke	2:13.96	2 q	2:13.91	3rd place, bronze medalist(s)
Francisco Javier Chacón	200 m butterfly	1:59.48	3 q	1:59.04	7
Francisco Javier Chacón	400 m individual medley	-	DQ	Did not advance	
Miguel Durán	200 m freestyle	1:52.67	15	Did not advance	
Miguel Durán	400 m freestyle	3:54.05	7 q	3:53.88	5
Miguel Durán	1500 m freestyle	—N/a		15:25.75	5
Marcos García Soto	50 m freestyle	23.74	17	Did not advance	
Marcos García Soto	50 m butterfly	24.71	9	Did not advance	
Luis García	100 m butterfly	54.21	9	Did not advance	
Jan Guiralt	200 m backstroke	2:02.80	6 q	2:03.03	8
Hugo González	50 m backstroke	25.59	4 q	25.50	5
Hugo González	200 m backstroke	2:00.42	1 q	1:58.94	2nd place, silver medalist(s)
Hugo González	200 m individual medley	2:02.26	2 q	2:00.53	2nd place, silver medalist(s)
David Levecq	100 m freestyle S10	56.25	2 q	55.24	2nd place, silver medalist(s)
Alberto Lozano	50 m butterfly	24.53	7 q	24.14	7
Alberto Lozano	100 m butterfly	53.70	4 q	53.75	6
José Antonio Mari-Alcaraz	100 m freestyle S10	57.34	3 q	56.62	4
Jorge Martín	100 m backstroke	56.26	5 q	55.88	6
Mario Navea	50 m breaststroke	28.54	10	Did not advance	
Mario Navea	100 m breaststroke	1:02.41	11	Did not advance	
Joan Lluis Pons	200 m butterfly	2:01.82	8 q	2:02.02	8
Joan Lluis Pons	400 m individual medley	4:21.32	1 q	4:17.97	2nd place, silver medalist(s)
Albert Puig	200 m individual medley	2:02.56	4 q	2:03.89	8
Marcos Rodríguez	400 m freestyle	3:53.55	5 q	3:54.51	6
Marc Sánchez	200 m freestyle	1:50.81	9	Did not advance	
Juan Francisco Segura	50 m freestyle	22.79	7 q	22.44	6
Juan Francisco Segura	100 m backstroke	57.37	11	Did not advance	
Juan Francisco Segura; Moritz Berg; Oskitz Aguilar; Alberto Lozano	4 × 100 m freestyle relay	—N/a		-	DQ
Marc Sánchez; Moritz Berg; Hugo González; Miguel Durán	4 × 200 m freestyle relay	—N/a		7:20.41	3rd place, bronze medalist(s)
Hugo González; Mario Navea; Alberto Lozano; Moritz Berg	4 × 100 m medley relay	—N/a		3:39:85	4

Women

Athlete	Event	Heat		Final	
Athlete	Event	Time	Rank	Time	Rank
Mireia Belmonte	400 m freestyle	4:12.11	1 q	4:05.87	2nd place, silver medalist(s)
Mireia Belmonte	800 m freestyle	—N/a		8:26.55	2nd place, silver medalist(s)
Mireia Belmonte	200 m butterfly	2:09.73	1 q	2:07.80	1st place, gold medalist(s)
Mireia Belmonte	200 m individual medley	2:14.29	1 q	2:11.66	1st place, gold medalist(s)
Mireia Belmonte	400 m individual medley	4:40.53	1 q	4:43.98	7
Marta Cano	100 m freestyle	57.24	12	Did not advance	
Catalina Corró	400 m individual medley	4:42.89	2 q	4:39.42	1st place, gold medalist(s)
Melani Costa	200 m freestyle	2:01.18	1 q	1:59.75	2nd place, silver medalist(s)
Melani Costa	400 m freestyle	4:15.89	5 q	4:15.13	6
Duane Da Rocha	50 m backstroke	28.94	3 q	28.57	2nd place, silver medalist(s)
Duane Da Rocha	100 m backstroke	1:02.27	4 q	1:01.40	4
Paloma De Bordons	50 m backstroke	29.17	5 q	28.87	5
Paloma De Bordons	100 m backstroke	1:02.01	3 q	1:02.70	6
Paloma De Bordons	200 m backstroke	—N/a		2:15.03	5
Marina García	50 m breaststroke	32.02	6 q	31.69	4
Marina García	100 m breaststroke	1:07.83	1 q	1:07.58	2nd place, silver medalist(s)
Marina García	200 m breaststroke	2:26.88	2 q	2:25.39	2nd place, silver medalist(s)
Sarai Gascón	100 m freestyle S10	—N/a		1:03.09	3rd place, bronze medalist(s)
Beatriz Gómez	200 m individual medley	2:15.74	4 q	2:14.91	4
Marta González	50 m freestyle	26.06	11	Did not advance	
Celeste Guerrero	100 m butterfly	1:03.36	13	Did not advance	
Carmen Herrero	50 m butterfly	28.10	12	Did not advance	
Aina Hierro	100 m butterfly	1:01.77	12	Did not advance	
Nuria Marqués	100 m freestyle S10	—N/a		1:04.47	5
Lidón Muñoz	50 m freestyle	25.29	2 q	25.20	2nd place, silver medalist(s)
Lidón Muñoz	100 m freestyle	56.14	6 q	55.28	2nd place, silver medalist(s)
Lidón Muñoz	200 m freestyle	2:01.63	2 q	2:00.25	4
Lidón Muñoz	50 m butterfly	27.73	11	Did not advance	
Jimena Pérez	800 m freestyle	—N/a		8:36.41	5
Jimena Pérez	200 m butterfly	2:14.39	9	Did not advance	
Jessica Vall	50 m breaststroke	31.88	4 q	31.49	3rd place, bronze medalist(s)
Jessica Vall	100 m breaststroke	1:07.90	2 q	1:07.19	1st place, gold medalist(s)
Jessica Vall	200 m breaststroke	2:26.69	1 q	2:25.22	1st place, gold medalist(s)
África Zamorano	200 m backstroke	—N/a		2:11.75	2nd place, silver medalist(s)
Marta González; Lidón Muñoz; Marta Cano; Melani Costa	4 × 100 m freestyle relay	—N/a		3:41.88	3rd place, bronze medalist(s)
Melani Costa; África Zamorano; Lidón Muñoz; Marta Cano	4 × 200 m freestyle relay	—N/a		8:04.53	3rd place, bronze medalist(s)
Duane Da Rocha; Jessica Vall; Lidón Muñoz; Marta González	4 × 100 m medley relay	—N/a		4:04.33	2nd place, silver medalist(s)

== Table tennis ==
Men

Athlete	Event	Round Robin 1		Round Robin 2		Quarterfinal	Semifinal	Final / BM	Rank
Athlete	Event	Opposition Score	Rank	Opposition Score	Rank	Opposition Score	Opposition Score	Opposition Score	Rank
Jesús Cantero	Singles	Karabaxhak (KOS) W 4-WO; Gündüz (TUR) L 3-4; Konstantinopoulos (GRE) W 4-1	2 Q	Elbeial (EGY) W 4-3; Seyfried (FRA) L 2-4; Stoyanov (ITA) W 4-3	1 Q	Kozul (SLO); W 4-3	Robinot (FRA); W 4-3	Jorgić (SLO); L 0-4	2nd place, silver medalist(s)
Carlos Franco	Singles	Elbeial (EGY) L 4-0; Yiangou (CYP) L 2-4	3	Did not advance					
Jesús Cantero; Carlos Franco; Carlos Machado	Team	—N/a		France (FRA) W 3-2; Kosovo (KOS) W 3-0	1 Q	Tunisia (TUN); W 3-0	Slovenia (SLO); L 0-3	Portugal (POR); L 2-3	4

Women

Athlete	Event	Round Robin 1		Round Robin 2		Quarterfinal	Semifinal	Final / BM	Rank
Athlete	Event	Opposition Score	Rank	Opposition Score	Rank	Opposition Score	Opposition Score	Opposition Score	Rank
Galia Dvorak	Singles	Markovic (BIH) W 4-0; Toliou (GRE) W 4-2	1 Q	Hassan (EGY) W 4-0; Zarif (FRA) W 4-0; Hadziahmetovic (FRA) L 4-2	1 Q	Toliou (GRE); W 4-3	Yang (MON); L 3-4	Lupulesku (SRB); W 3-4	3rd place, bronze medalist(s)
María Xiao	Singles	Loghraibi (ALG) W 4-0; Yilmaz (TUR) W 4-0	1 Q	Altinkaya (TUR) W 4-2; Loeuillette (FRA) W 4-2; Lupulesku (SRB) L 2-4	2 Q	Yang (MON); L 1-4	Did not advance		
Galia Dvorak; María Xiao; Sofia-Xuan Zhang	Team	—N/a		Greece (GRE) W 3-0; Algeria (ALG) W 3-0	1 Q	Italy (ITA); W 3-0	France (FRA); W 3-0	Turkey (TUR); W 3-1	1st place, gold medalist(s)

== Taekwondo ==
Men

Athlete	Event	Preliminary round	Quarterfinals	Semifinals	Final	
Athlete	Event	Opposition Score	Opposition Score	Opposition Score	Opposition Score	Rank
Jesús Tortosa	-58kg	BYE	Farag (EGY); W 10-1	Neffati (TUN); W 18-16	Bragança (POR); W 15-2	1st place, gold medalist(s)
Javier Pérez Polo	-68kg	Costa (POR); W 25-13	Abow (EGY); W 28-8	Spinosa (ITA); W 29-4	Chamalidis (GRE); W 19-7	1st place, gold medalist(s)
Raúl Martínez García	-80kg	Ejupi (KOS); W 26-0	Fejzić (SRB); W 14-2	Ferreira (POR); W 19-6	Eissa (EGY); W 19-14	1st place, gold medalist(s)
Daniel Ros	+80kg	BYE	Bassel (MAR); W 16-11	Ateşli (TUR); W 19-13	Giorgievski (MKD); W 24-9	1st place, gold medalist(s)

Women

Athlete	Event	Preliminary round	Quarterfinals	Semifinals	Final	
Athlete	Event	Opposition Score	Opposition Score	Opposition Score	Opposition Score	Rank
Blanca Palmer Soler	-49kg	Apoikou (GRE); W 25-7	Tomić (CRO); L 5-12	Did not advance		
Marta Calvo	-57kg	BYE	Tzeli (GRE); W 14-7	Yaman (TUR); L 5-7	Did not advance	3rd place, bronze medalist(s)
Eva Calvo	-67kg	Kriem (MAR); W 7-2	Jelić (CRO); L 10-7	Did not advance		
Cecilia Castro Burgos	+67kg	BYE	Dislam (MAR); L 4-5	Did not advance		

== Tennis ==
Men

Athlete	Event	Round of 32	Round of 16	Quarterfinals	Semifinals	Final / BM	
Athlete	Event	Opposition Score	Opposition Score	Opposition Score	Opposition Score	Opposition Score	Rank
Álvaro López	Singles	Habib (LBN); L 5–7, 6–2, 7-6	Did not advance				
Miguel Semmler	Singles	Berrettini (ITA); L 4–6, 3-6	Did not advance				
Álvaro López; Miguel Semmler	Doubles	—N/a	Hassen/Ikhlef (ALG); W 6–3, 6-2	Saraiva/Falcão (POR); L 6–4, 5–7, 10-5	Did not advance		

Women

Athlete	Event	Round of 32	Round of 16	Quarterfinals	Semifinals	Final / BM	
Athlete	Event	Opposition Score	Opposition Score	Opposition Score	Opposition Score	Opposition Score	Rank
Marina Bassols Ribera	Singles	Bye	Erjavec (SLO); L 4–6, 3-6	Did not advance			
Eva Guerrero	Singles	Bye	Siopacha (CYP); W 2–6, 6–0, 6-1	Eraydın (TUR); L 6–4, 6-2	Did not advance		
Marina Bassols Ribera; Eva Guerrero	Doubles	—N/a	Bye	Murta/Quitério (POR); W 6–4, 6-4	Eraydın/Öz (TUR); W 2–6, 1-6	Ferro/Tan (FRA); W 7–5, 7-5	3rd place, bronze medalist(s)

== Triathlon ==
Athlete	Event	Swim	Trans 1	Bike	Trans 2	Run	Total Time	Rank
Antonio Benito	Men's	10:13	00:31	31:11	00:22	15:43	57:57	3rd place, bronze medalist(s)
Antonio Serrat	Men's	10:11	00:32	31:11	00:23	15:30	57:45	2nd place, silver medalist(s)
Anna Godoy	Women's	10:21	00:31	37:10	00:26	18:08	1:06:34	2nd place, silver medalist(s)
Cecilia Santamaría	Women's	10:26	00:33	37:04	00:30	20:03	1:08:33	5

== Water skiing ==
Athlete	Event	Heat		Final	
Athlete	Event	Points	Rank	Points	Rank
Roger Ballus	Men's slalom	0.50/55/14.25	10 Q	2.50/55/16.00	9
Álvaro Noguera	Men's slalom	3.00/55/14.25	9 Q	2.50/55/14.25	7
Sandra Botas	Women's slalom	3.00/52/16.00	6 Q	3.00/52/16.00	6
Patricia Escolar	Women's slalom	3.00/40	17	Did not advance	

== Weightlifting ==
Men

Athlete	Event	Snatch		Clean & jerk	
Athlete	Event	Result	Rank	Result	Rank
Josué Brachi	−62 kg	121	3rd place, bronze medalist(s)	140	5
Acorán Hernández	−69 kg	137	7	160	7
David Sánchez	−69 kg	141	4	170	6
Andrés Mata	−77 kg	152	2nd place, silver medalist(s)	189	2nd place, silver medalist(s)
Manuel Sánchez	−94 kg	154	4	185	3rd place, bronze medalist(s)

Women

Athlete	Event	Snatch		Clean & jerk	
Athlete	Event	Result	Rank	Result	Rank
Atenery Hernández	−53 kg	80	2nd place, silver medalist(s)	98	4
Alba Sánchez	−58 kg	82	4	105	3rd place, bronze medalist(s)
Mouna Skandi	−58 kg	75	6	100	4
Irene Martínez	−63 kg	94	3rd place, bronze medalist(s)	108	5
Ilia Hernández	−69 kg	-	-	115	3rd place, bronze medalist(s)
Lydia Valentín	−75 kg	112	1st place, gold medalist(s)	137	1st place, gold medalist(s)

== Wrestling ==
Men's Freestyle

Athlete	Event	Round Robin	Round of 16	Quarterfinal	Semifinal	Repechage 1	Repechage 2	Final / BM	
Athlete	Event	Round Robin	Opposition Result	Opposition Result	Opposition Result	Opposition Result	Opposition Result	Opposition Result	Rank
Juan Pablo González	−65 kg	—N/a	Habat (SLO); L 6-2	Did not advance			Prizreni (ALB); W 2-0	Mukhtarov (FRA); L 2-3	5
Agustí López	−74 kg	—N/a	Bye	Demir (TUR); L 10-0	Did not advance				
Taimuraz Friev	−86 kg	Caneva (ITA) W 9-0; Bilici (TUR) L 13-10; Aibuev (FRA) L 2-2; Veselovski (MKD) W 10-0	—N/a						3rd place, bronze medalist(s)
Antonio Rodríguez	−97 kg	—N/a	Bye	Nurov (MKD); L 9-0	Did not advance			Dede (TUR); L 10-0	5

Men's Greco-Roman

Athlete	Event	Round of 16	Quarterfinal	Semifinal	Repechage 1	Repechage 2	Final / BM	
Athlete	Event	Opposition Result	Opposition Result	Opposition Result	Opposition Result	Opposition Result	Opposition Result	Rank
Albert Baghumyan	−60 kg	Bye	Laouni (ALG); L 0-5	Did not advance				
Óscar Parra	−67 kg	Ozain (FRA); L 0–9	Did not advance		Sanfilippo (ITA); L 1–3	Did not advance		
Ismael Navarro	−77 kg	Margaryan (FRA); L 0–10	Did not advance					
Pedro Jacinto García	−87 kg	Bye	Necaj (ALB); W 10-0	Basar (TUR); L 8-0	—N/a		Stankić (SRB); L 4-1	5
Jesús Gasca	−97 kg	Bye	Boudjemline (ALG); L 9-0	Did not advance	—N/a		Ahmed (EGY); L 10-0	5

Women's Freestyle

Athlete	Event	Round robin	Group stage	Place	Semifinal	Final / BM	
Athlete	Event	Round robin	Opposition Result	Place	Opposition Result	Opposition Result	Rank
Aintzane Gorría	−50 kg	—N/a	Yahiaoui (ALG) W 16-4; Gazy (EGY) L 6-2	2 Q	Savatie (FRA); L 10-0	Yahiaoui (ALG); W 8-0	3rd place, bronze medalist(s)
Marina Rueda	−53 kg	Erge (TUR) L 14-5; Honorine (FRA) L 8-2; Prevolaraki (GRE) L 10-0; Mori (ITA) L 12-6	—N/a				5
Graciela Sánchez	−57 kg	Rainero (ITA) L 8-0; Aouissi (ALG) W 6-2; Demirkan (GRE) W 6-2; Gün (TUR) L 2-0	—N/a				3rd place, bronze medalist(s)
Lydia Pérez	−62 kg	—N/a	Yeşilırmak (TUR) L 5-0; Baudin (FRA) W 11-0	2 Q	Amri (TUN); L 5-0	Da Col (ITA); L 5-4	4
Noelia Lalín	−68 kg	Lecarpentier (FRA) L 6-0; Caneva (ITA) L 6-0; Tosun (TUR) L 11-0; Hamza (EGY) L 10-0	—N/a				5
