= Swimming at the 2018 Mediterranean Games – Women's 400 metre freestyle =

Women's 400 metre freestyle at the 2018 Mediterranean Games
- Venue: Campclar Aquatic Center
- Location: Tarragona, Spain
- Dates: 25 June
- Competitors: 15 from 9 nations
- Winning time: 4:05.68

Medalists
gold medal	Simona Quadarella	Italy
silver medal	Mireia Belmonte	Spain
bronze medal	Diana Durães	Portugal

The women's 400 metre freestyle competition at the 2018 Mediterranean Games was held on 25 June 2018 at the Campclar Aquatic Center.

== Records ==
Prior to this competition, the existing world and Mediterranean Games records were as follows:

World record	Katie Ledecky (USA)	3:56.46	Rio de Janeiro, Brazil	7 August 2016
Mediterranean Games record	Federica Pellegrini (ITA)	4:00.41	Pescara, Italy	27 June 2009

== Results ==
=== Heats ===
The heats were held at 10:32.

Rank	Heat	Lane	Name	Nationality	Time	Notes
1	2	5	Mireia Belmonte	Spain	4:12.11	Q
2	1	4	Simona Quadarella	Italy	4:12.76	Q
3	2	3	Diana Durães	Portugal	4:13.36	Q
4	1	6	Anja Crevar	Serbia	4:14.24	Q
5	2	6	Melani Costa	Spain	4:15.89	Q
6	1	5	Linda Caponi	Italy	4:16.59	Q
7	1	3	Katja Fain	Slovenia	4:17.80	Q
8	2	4	Anja Klinar	Slovenia	4:18.78	Q, WD
9	1	2	Kalliopi Araouzou	Greece	4:18.81	Q
10	2	2	Tamila Holub	Portugal	4:19.18	
11	2	7	Beril Böcekler	Turkey	4:20.44	
12	1	1	Arianna Valloni	San Marino	4:24.25	
13	1	7	Afroditi Katsiara	Greece	4:24.70	
14	2	8	Sara Lettoli	San Marino	4:30.56	
15	1	8	Gabriella Doueihy	Lebanon	4:32.77	

=== Final ===
The final was held at 19:00.

Rank	Lane	Name	Nationality	Time	Notes
1st place, gold medalist(s)	5	Simona Quadarella	Italy	4:05.68	
2nd place, silver medalist(s)	4	Mireia Belmonte	Spain	4:05.87	
3rd place, bronze medalist(s)	3	Diana Durães	Portugal	4:09.49	NR
4	7	Linda Caponi	Italy	4:12.16	
5	6	Anja Crevar	Serbia	4:12.88	
6	2	Melani Costa	Spain	4:15.13	
7	1	Katja Fain	Slovenia	4:17.42	
8	8	Kalliopi Araouzou	Greece	4:22.11	
