= Triathlon at the 2018 Mediterranean Games =

- Venue: Altafulla
- Dates: 23 June

The triathlon tournament at the 2018 Mediterranean Games took place on 23 June at the Altafulla Urban Circuit. Men's and women's tournament were held.

== Medal summary ==
=== Events ===
Event	Gold	Silver	Bronze
Men	João Pereira; Portugal	Antonio Serrat; Spain	Antonio Benito; Spain
Women	Melanie Santos; Portugal	Anna Godoy; Spain	Federica Parodi; Italy
