= Melanie Santos =

Portuguese triathlete (born 1995)

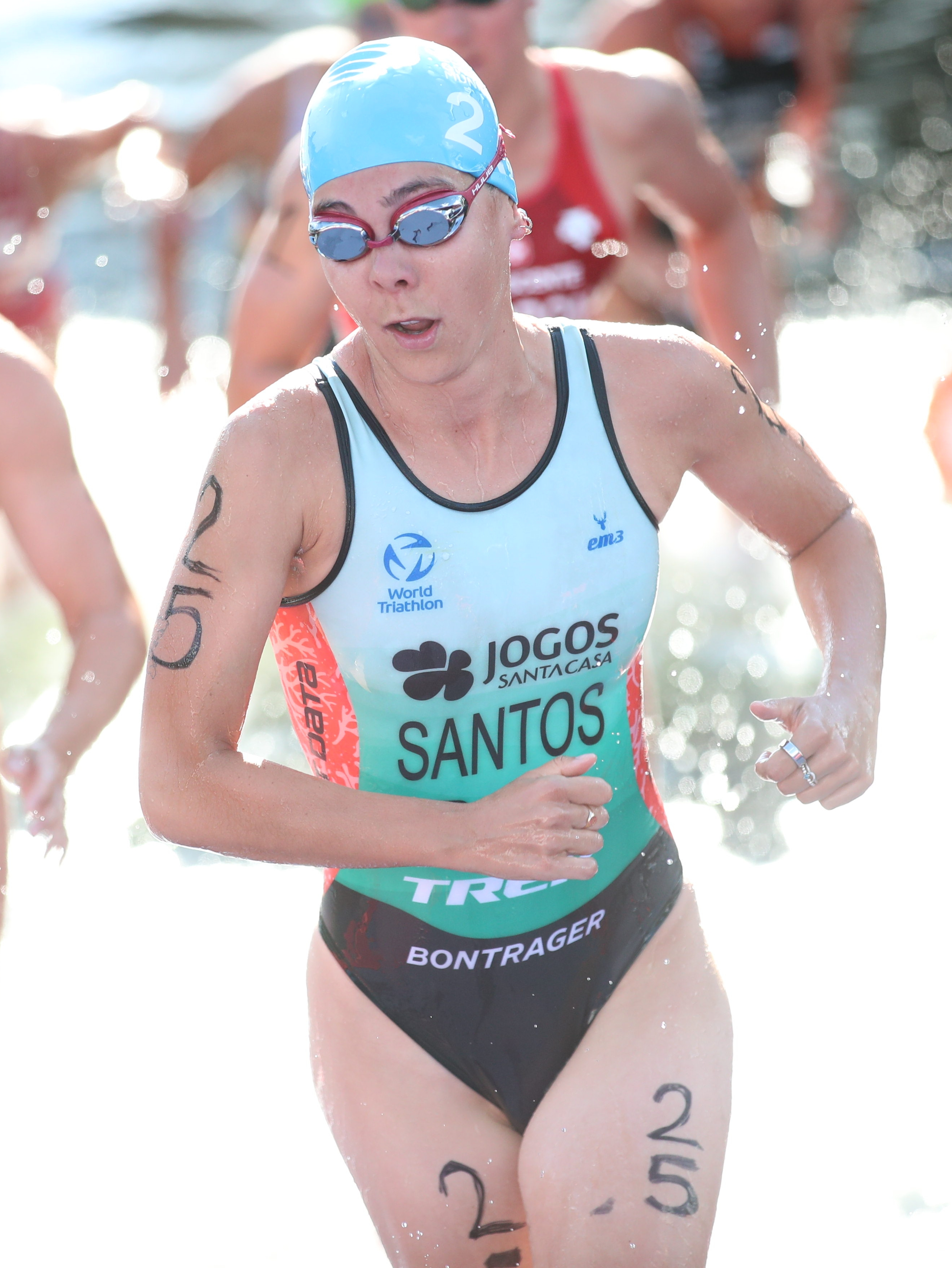

Personal information
- Full name: Melanie Bronze dos Santos
- Nationality: Portuguese
- Born: 12 July 1995 (age 30) Basel, Switzerland
- Height: 169 cm (5 ft 7 in)
- Weight: 52 kg (115 lb)

Sport
- Country: Portugal
- Sport: Triathlon
- Club: Benfica

Achievements and titles
- Olympic finals: 22nd (2020)
Medal record
Women's triathlon
Representing Portugal
Mediterranean Games
Gold medal – first place	2018 Tarragona	Sprint

Melanie Bronze dos Santos (born 12 July 1995) is a Portuguese triathlete. She won the gold medal at the 2018 Mediterranean Games in the women's individual sprint. In 2021, she competed in the women's event at the 2020 Summer Olympics in Tokyo, Japan. She competed in the women's triathlon at the 2024 Summer Olympics in Paris, France.

== Early life ==
She started practising triathlon at 15 years old.

== Personal life ==
She is now married to Portuguese triathlete João Pereira. They both represent Benfica and the Portuguese national team. In 2018, they both won the gold medal in the individual events of the 2018 Mediterranean Games.
