= Swimming at the 2018 Mediterranean Games – Women's 200 metre breaststroke =

Women's 200 metre breaststroke at the 2018 Mediterranean Games
- Venue: Campclar Aquatic Center
- Location: Tarragona, Spain
- Dates: 23 June
- Competitors: 9 from 6 nations
- Winning time: 2:25.22

Medalists
gold medal	Jessica Vall	Spain
silver medal	Marina García Urzainqui	Spain
bronze medal	Viktoriya Zeynep Güneş	Turkey

The women's 200 metre breaststroke competition at the 2018 Mediterranean Games was held on 23 June 2018 at the Campclar Aquatic Center.

== Records ==
Prior to this competition, the existing world and Mediterranean Games records were as follows:

World record	Rikke Møller Pedersen (DEN)	2:19.11	Barcelona, Spain	1 August 2013
Mediterranean Games record	Coralie Dobral (FRA)	2:26.41	Pescara, Italy	29 June 2009

The following records were established during the competition:

Date	Event	Name	Nationality	Time	Record
23 June	Final	Jessica Vall	Spain	2:25.22	GR

== Results ==
=== Heats ===
The heats were held at 10:18.

Rank	Heat	Lane	Name	Nationality	Time	Notes
1	2	4	Jessica Vall	Spain	2:26.69	Q
2	1	4	Marina García Urzainqui	Spain	2:26.88	Q
3	2	6	Viktoriya Zeynep Güneş	Turkey	2:28.80	Q
4	2	5	Francesca Fangio	Italy	2:30.29	Q
5	2	3	Tjaša Vozel	Slovenia	2:31.30	Q
6	1	3	Raquel Gomes Pereira	Portugal	2:31.58	Q
7	1	5	Martina Carraro	Italy	2:31.68	Q
8	2	2	Tina Čelik	Slovenia	2:35.48	Q
9	1	6	Emina Pašukan	Bosnia and Herzegovina	2:35.80	

=== Final ===
The final was held at 18:27.

Rank	Lane	Name	Nationality	Time	Notes
1st place, gold medalist(s)	4	Jessica Vall	Spain	2:25.22	GR
2nd place, silver medalist(s)	5	Marina García Urzainqui	Spain	2:25.39	
3rd place, bronze medalist(s)	3	Viktoriya Zeynep Güneş	Turkey	2:26.92	
4	6	Francesca Fangio	Italy	2:29.01	
5	7	Raquel Gomes Pereira	Portugal	2:29.57	
6	1	Martina Carraro	Italy	2:29.62	
7	2	Tjaša Vozel	Slovenia	2:29.88	
8	8	Tina Čelik	Slovenia	2:37.43	
