= Swimming at the 2018 Mediterranean Games – Men's 1500 metre freestyle =

Men's 1500 metre freestyle at the 2018 Mediterranean Games
- Venue: Campclar Aquatic Center
- Location: Tarragona, Spain
- Dates: 24 June
- Competitors: 9 from 7 nations
- Winning time: 14:46.25

Medalists
gold medal	Gregorio Paltrinieri	Italy
silver medal	Domenico Acerenza	Italy
bronze medal	Joris Bouchaut	France

The men's 1500 metre freestyle competition at the 2018 Mediterranean Games was held on 24 June 2018 at the Campclar Aquatic Center.

== Records ==
Prior to this competition, the existing world and Mediterranean Games records were as follows:

World record	Sun Yang (CHN)	14:31.02	London, United Kingdom	4 August 2012
Mediterranean Games record	Oussama Mellouli (TUN)	14:38.01	Pescara, Italy	1 July 2009

== Results ==
The heats were held at 10:28 and 18:38.

Rank	Heat	Lane	Name	Nationality	Time	Notes
1st place, gold medalist(s)	2	4	Gregorio Paltrinieri	Italy	14:46.25	
2nd place, silver medalist(s)	2	5	Domenico Acerenza	Italy	14:55.44	
3rd place, bronze medalist(s)	2	3	Joris Bouchaut	France	15:08.70	
4	2	1	Dimitrios Negris	Greece	15:13.13	
5	2	6	Miguel Durán	Spain	15:25.75	
6	2	2	Guilherme Pina	Portugal	15:29.37	
7	2	7	Antonio Arroyo	Spain	15:32.11	
8	1	4	Nezir Karap	Turkey	15:56.04	
9	1	5	Mohamed Djaballah	Algeria	16:05.76	
