= Swimming at the 2018 Mediterranean Games – Women's 200 metre backstroke =

Women's 200 metre backstroke at the 2018 Mediterranean Games
- Venue: Campclar Aquatic Center
- Location: Tarragona, Spain
- Dates: 25 June
- Competitors: 8 from 6 nations
- Winning time: 2:08.08

Medalists
gold medal	Margherita Panziera	Italy
silver medal	África Zamorano	Spain
bronze medal	Ekaterina Avramova	Turkey

The women's 200 metre backstroke competition at the 2018 Mediterranean Games was held on 25 June 2018 at the Campclar Aquatic Center.

== Records ==
Prior to this competition, the existing world and Mediterranean Games records were as follows:

World record	Missy Franklin (USA)	2:04.06	London, United Kingdom	3 August 2012
Mediterranean Games record	Alessia Filippi (ITA)	2:08.03	Pescara, Italy	28 June 2009

== Results ==
The final was held at 18:17.

Rank	Lane	Name	Nationality	Time	Notes
1st place, gold medalist(s)	4	Margherita Panziera	Italy	2:08.08	
2nd place, silver medalist(s)	5	África Zamorano	Spain	2:11.75	
3rd place, bronze medalist(s)	7	Ekaterina Avramova	Turkey	2:13.43	
4	3	Carlotta Toni	Italy	2:14.22	
5	2	Paloma de Bordóns	Spain	2:15.03	
6	6	Camille Gheorghiu	France	2:16.83	
7	1	Rita Frischknecht	Portugal	2:17.10	
8	8	Claudia Verdino	Monaco	2:28.59	
