= Golf at the 2018 Mediterranean Games =

- Venue: Costa Daurada Golf Club
- Dates: 25–28 June

The golf competitions at the 2018 Mediterranean Games in Tarragona took place between 25 and 28 June at the Costa Daurada Golf Club.

Athletes competed in four events.

== Medal summary ==
Event	Gold	Silver	Bronze
Men's individual	Mario Galiano; Spain	Aron Zemmer; Italy	Žan Luka Štirn (a); Slovenia
Men's team	Spain; Mario Galiano; Iván Cantero; Álvaro Velasco	Italy; Aron Zemmer; Jacopo Vecchi Fossa; Philip Geerts	France; Nicolas Platret (a); Paul Foulquié (a); Marin D'Harcourt (a)
Women's individual	Marta Sanz; Spain	Angelica Moresco (a); Italy	Ana Belac (a); Slovenia
Women's team	Spain; Marta Sanz; Natalia Escuriola; Patricia Sanz	Italy; Roberta Liti (a); Diana Luna; Angelica Moresco (a)	Slovenia; Pia Babnik (a); Vida Obersnel (a); Ana Belac (a)

(a) denotes an amateur golfer

== Medal table ==
Rank	Nation	Gold	Silver	Bronze	Total
1	Spain	4	0	0	4
2	Italy	0	4	0	4
3	Slovenia	0	0	3	3
4	France	0	0	1	1
Totals (4 entries)		4	4	4	12
