= Sailing at the 2018 Mediterranean Games =

International sporting competition

- Venue: Salou Yacht Club
- Dates: 23–29 June

The sailing competitions at the 2018 Mediterranean Games took place between 23 and 29 June in front of the Salou Yacht Club. Athletes competed in four events.

== Medal summary ==
=== Men's events ===
Event	Gold	Silver	Bronze
Laser	Joaquín Blanco Albalat; Spain	Pavlos Kontides; Cyprus	Joel Rodríguez; Spain
RS:X	Mattia Camboni; Italy	Louis Giard; France	Matteo Evangelisti; Italy

=== Women's events ===
Event	Gold	Silver	Bronze
Laser Radial	Athanasia Fakidi; Greece	Silvia Zennaro; Italy	Martina Reino; Spain
RS:X	Blanca Manchón; Spain	Marina Alabau; Spain	Flavia Tartaglini; Italy

=== Medal table ===
Rank	Nation	Gold	Silver	Bronze	Total
1	Spain*	2	1	2	5
2	Italy	1	1	2	4
3	Greece	1	0	0	1
4	Cyprus	0	1	0	1
4	France	0	1	0	1
Totals (5 entries)		4	4	4	12
