= João José Pereira =

Portuguese triathlete

João Pereira
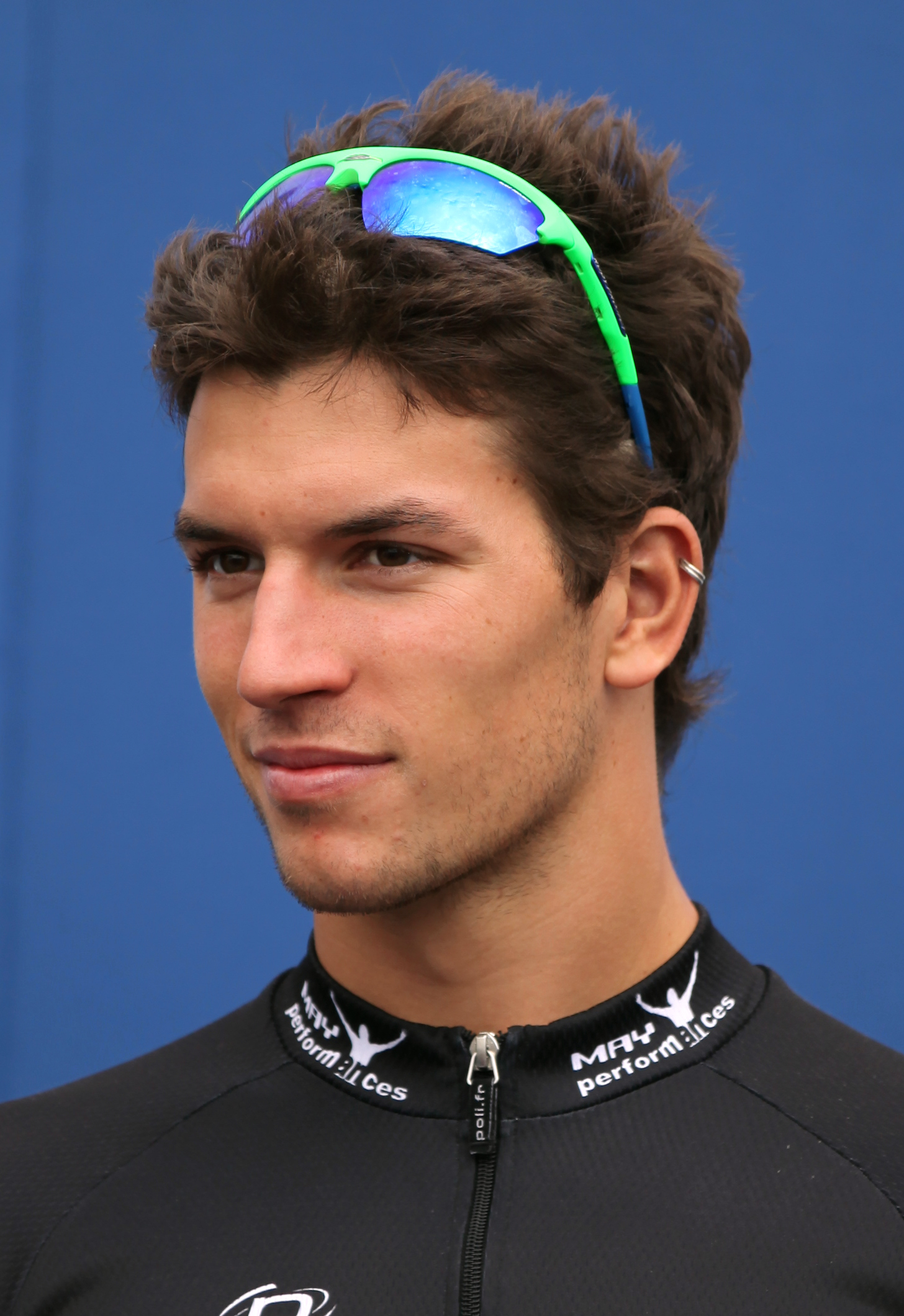
- Pereira among the winners at the French Club Championship Series in Paris, 2011

Personal information
- Full name: João José Sales Henriques de Carvalho Pereira
- Born: Caldas da Rainha, Portugal
- Height: 186 cm (6 ft 1 in)
- Weight: 71 kg (157 lb)

Sport
- Sport: Triathlon
- Rank: 23
- Team: Benfica
- Turned pro: 2009
- Coached by: Pedro Leitão
Medal record
Men's triathlon
Representing Portugal
European Triathlon Championships
Gold medal – first place	2017 Kitzbühel	Individual
Silver medal – second place	2019 Weert	Individual
Europe Triathlon Sprint Championships
Gold medal – first place	2017 Düsseldorf	Individual
Mediterranean Games
Gold medal – first place	2018 Tarragona	Sprint

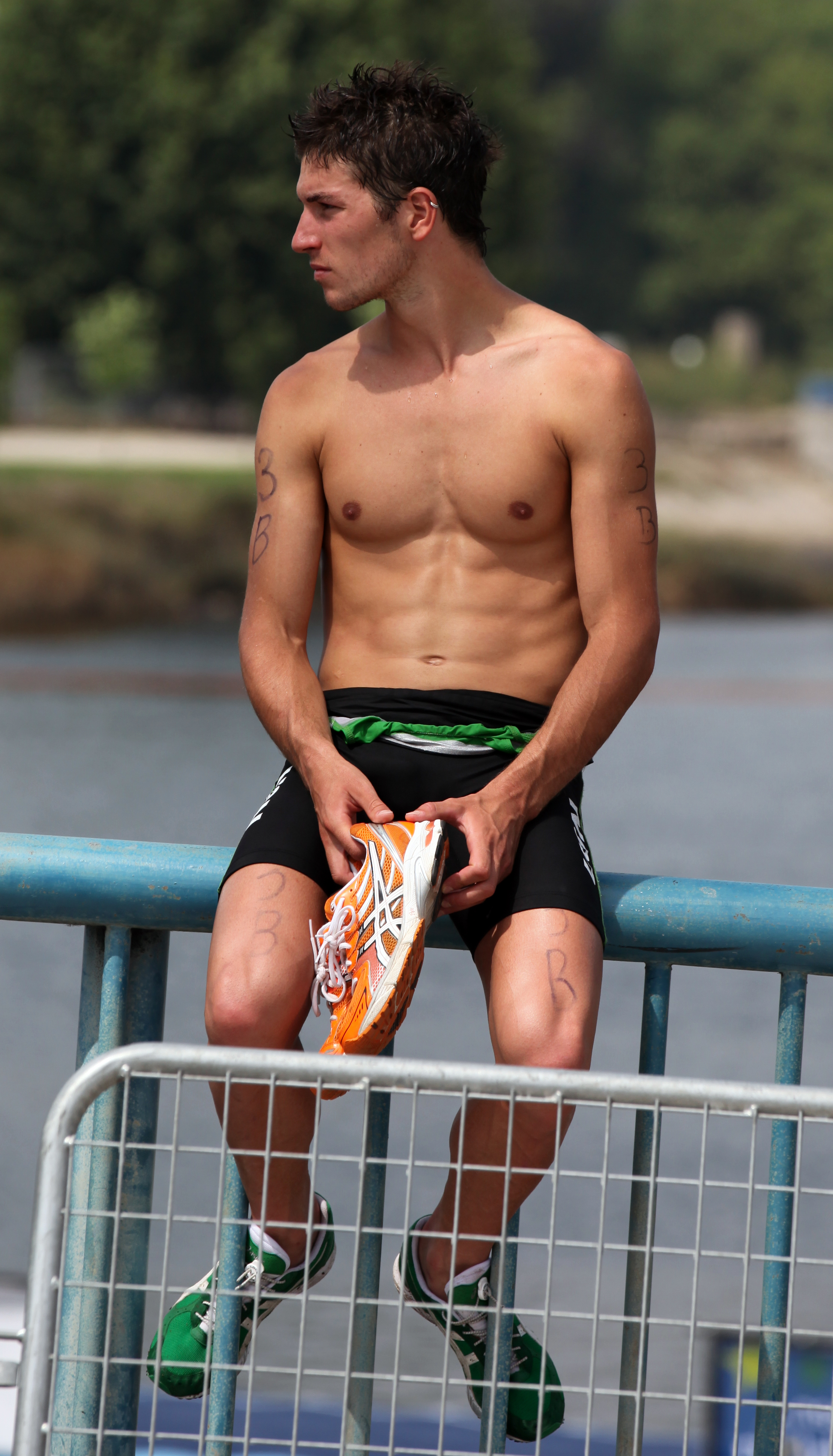
João Pereira at the European Championships in Pontevedra, 2011

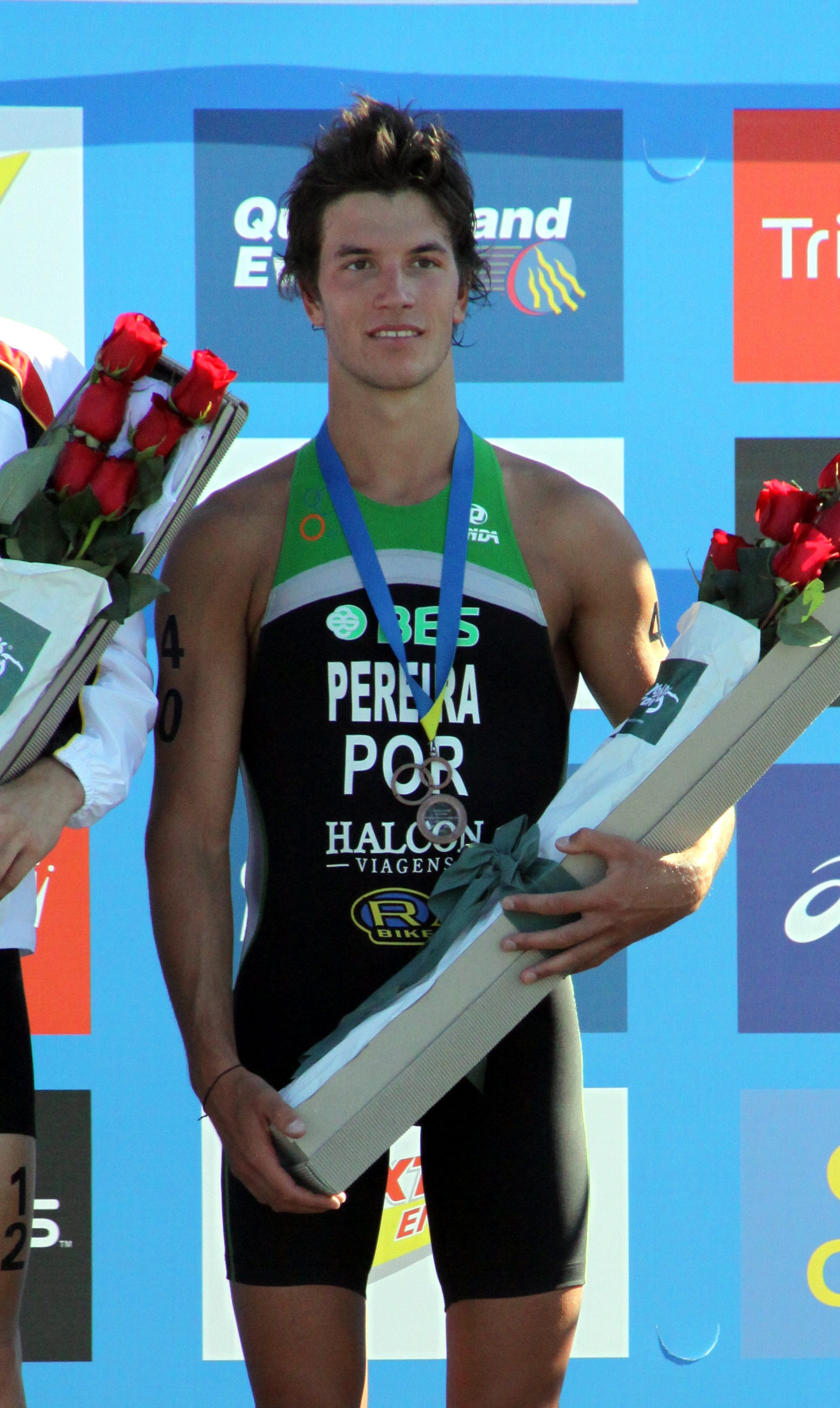
João Pereira, bronze medalist at the U23 World Championships, Gold Coast 2009

João José Sales Henriques de Carvalho Pereira (born 28 December 1987) is a Portuguese triathlete who represents Benfica, at club level, and the Portuguese national team.

== Career ==
In June 2015, Pereira finished 8th at the Men's triathlon competition of the European Games in Baku, Azerbaijan.

The following season, he placed fifth at the Men's triathlon of the 2016 Summer Olympics in Rio de Janeiro, Brazil.

In June 2018, Pereira won a gold medal at the 2018 Mediterranean Games.

In July 2021, he placed 27th at Men's triathlon of the 2020 Summer Olympics in Tokyo, Japan.

== Personal life ==
Pereira is engaged to Portuguese triathlete Melanie Santos. They both represent Benfica and the Portuguese national team. In 2018, they both won the gold medal in the individual events of the 2018 Mediterranean Games.
