= Swimming at the 2018 Mediterranean Games – Men's 100 metre freestyle S10 =

Men's 100 metre freestyle S10 at the 2018 Mediterranean Games
- Venue: Campclar Aquatic Center
- Location: Tarragona, Spain
- Dates: 25 June
- Competitors: 12 from 8 nations
- Winning time: 53.38

Medalists
| gold medal | Stefano Raimondi | Italy |
| silver medal | David Levecq | Spain |
| bronze medal | Riccardo Menciotti | Italy |

The men's 100 metre freestyle S10 competition at the 2018 Mediterranean Games was held on 25 June 2018 at the Campclar Aquatic Center.

== Records ==
| World record | André Brasil (BRA) | 50.87 | Eindhoven, Netherlands | 17 August 2010 |

== Results ==
=== Heats ===
The heats were held at 10:07.

| Rank | Heat | Lane | Name | Nationality | Time | Notes |
|---|---|---|---|---|---|---|
| 1 | 2 | 4 | Stefano Raimondi | Italy | 54.82 | Q |
| 2 | 1 | 4 | David Levecq | Spain | 56.25 | Q |
| 3 | 1 | 5 | Jose Antonio Marí | Spain | 57.34 | Q |
| 4 | 2 | 5 | Riccardo Menciotti | Italy | 57.38 | Q |
| 5 | 2 | 2 | Florent Marais | France | 58.18 | Q |
| 6 | 1 | 3 | Ilija Tadić | Montenegro | 1:00.12 | Q |
| 7 | 1 | 2 | Dario Burić | Croatia | 1:00.13 | Q |
| 8 | 1 | 6 | Uğurcan Özer | Turkey | 1:00.32 | Q |
| 9 | 2 | 3 | Nicolas Le Hir | France | 1:00.44 | |
| 10 | 2 | 7 | Dimosthenis Michalentzakis | Greece | 1:00.70 | |
| 11 | 2 | 6 | Matej Petrlić | Croatia | 1:00.81 | |
| 12 | 1 | 7 | Nermin Memić | Bosnia and Herzegovina | 1:29.95 | |

=== Final ===
The final was held at 18:32.

| Rank | Lane | Name | Nationality | Time | Notes |
|---|---|---|---|---|---|
| 1st place, gold medalist(s) | 4 | Stefano Raimondi | Italy | 53.38 | |
| 2nd place, silver medalist(s) | 5 | David Levecq | Spain | 55.24 | |
| 3rd place, bronze medalist(s) | 6 | Riccardo Menciotti | Italy | 55.94 | |
| 4 | 3 | Jose Antonio Marí | Spain | 56.62 | |
| 5 | 2 | Florent Marais | France | 57.98 | |
| 6 | 1 | Dario Burić | Croatia | 59.84 | |
| 7 | 8 | Uğurcan Özer | Turkey | 1:00.01 | |
| 8 | 7 | Ilija Tadić | Montenegro | 1:00.27 | |
