= Swimming at the 2018 Mediterranean Games – Women's 200 metre butterfly =

Sporting event

Women's 200 metre butterfly at the 2018 Mediterranean Games
- Venue: Campclar Aquatic Center
- Location: Tarragona, Spain
- Dates: 25 June
- Competitors: 11 from 7 nations
- Winning time: 2:07.80

Medalists
gold medal	Mireia Belmonte	Spain
silver medal	Ana Monteiro	Portugal
bronze medal	Alessia Polieri	Italy

The women's 200 metre butterfly competition at the 2018 Mediterranean Games was held on 25 June 2018 at the Campclar Aquatic Center.

== Records ==
Prior to this competition, the existing world and Mediterranean Games records were as follows:

World record	Liu Zige (CHN)	2:01.81	Jinan, China	21 October 2009
Mediterranean Games record	Caterina Giacchetti (ITA)	2:06.89	Pescara, Italy	1 July 2009

== Results ==
=== Heats ===
The heats were held at 09:50.

Rank	Heat	Lane	Name	Nationality	Time	Notes
1	2	4	Mireia Belmonte	Spain	2:09.73	Q
2	2	3	Ana Monteiro	Portugal	2:10.27	Q
3	2	5	Anja Klinar	Slovenia	2:11.54	Q
4	1	3	Nida Eliz Üstündağ	Turkey	2:12.82	Q
5	1	5	Stefania Pirozzi	Italy	2:13.31	Q
6	1	4	Alessia Polieri	Italy	2:13.43	Q
7	2	6	Victoria Kaminskaya	Portugal	2:13.94	Q
8	1	6	Anna Ntountounaki	Greece	2:14.10	Q
9	2	2	Jimena Pérez	Spain	2:14.39	
10	1	2	Ilektra Lebl	Greece	2:18.37	
11	1	7	Beatrice Felici	San Marino	2:35.41	
	2	7	Samar Kacha	Algeria	DNS	

=== Final ===
The final was held at 17:57.

Rank	Lane	Name	Nationality	Time	Notes
1st place, gold medalist(s)	4	Mireia Belmonte	Spain	2:07.80	
2nd place, silver medalist(s)	5	Ana Monteiro	Portugal	2:08.06	NR
3rd place, bronze medalist(s)	7	Alessia Polieri	Italy	2:08.46	
4	3	Anja Klinar	Slovenia	2:10.26	
5	2	Stefania Pirozzi	Italy	2:11.50	
6	6	Nida Eliz Üstündağ	Turkey	2:12.07	
7	1	Victoria Kaminskaya	Portugal	2:12.43	
8	8	Anna Ntountounaki	Greece	2:14.54	
