= Anna Godoy =

Spanish triathlete (born 1992)

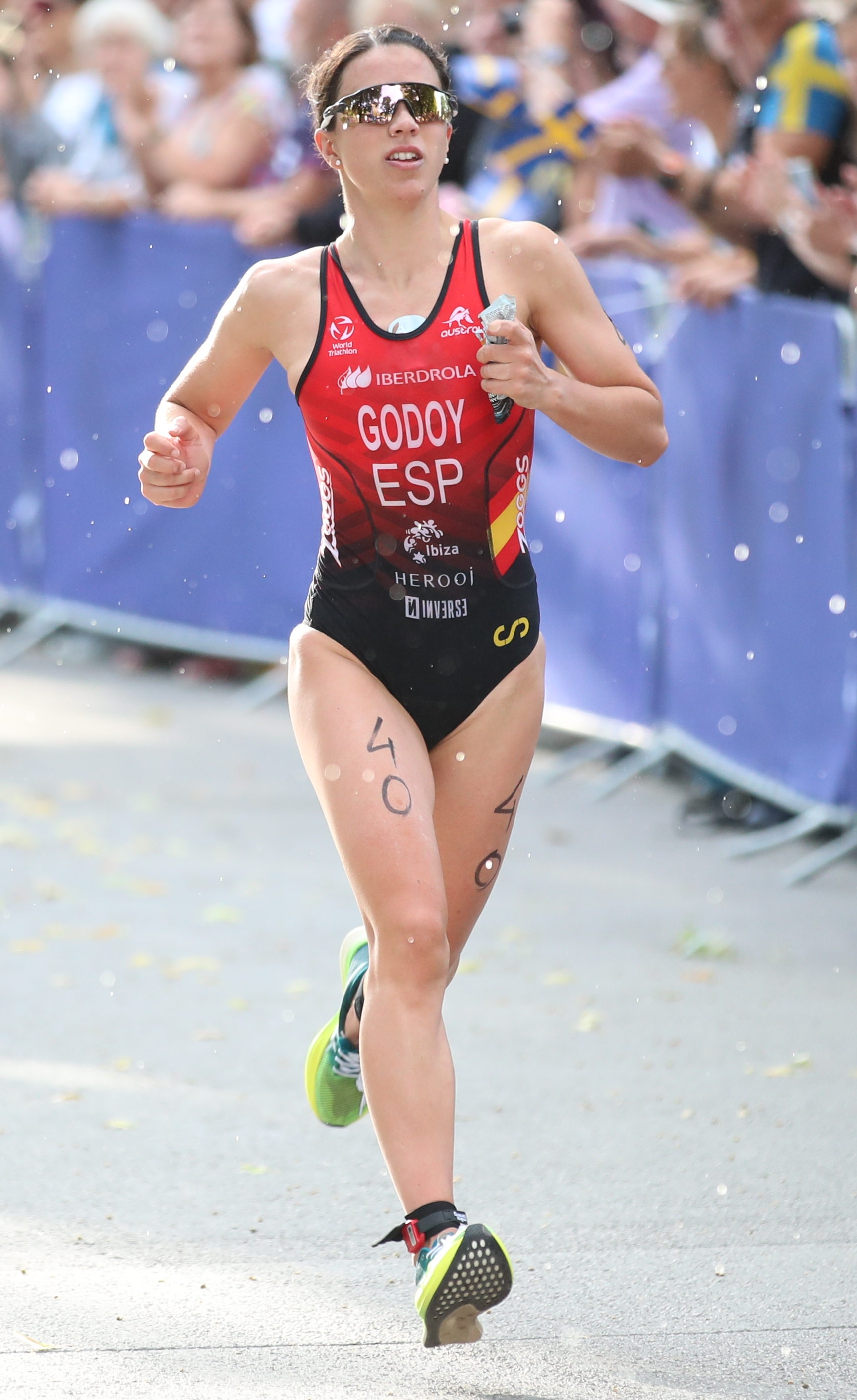

Personal information
- Full name: Anna Godoy Contreras
- Nationality: Spanish
- Born: 21 October 1992 (age 33) Barcelona, Spain

Sport
- Sport: Triathlon
Medal record
Triathlon
Representing Spain
Mediterranean Games
Silver medal – second place	2018 Tarragona	Women's sprint

Anna Godoy Contreras (born 21 October 1992) is a Spanish triathlete. She competed in the women's event at the 2020 Summer Olympics held in Tokyo, Japan. She also competed in the mixed relay event.

In 2010, she competed in the girls' triathlon and mixed relay events at the 2010 Summer Youth Olympics held in Singapore.

She competed in the women's triathlon at the 2024 Summer Olympics in Paris, France.
