= Emma Boada =

Spanish handball player (born 1994)

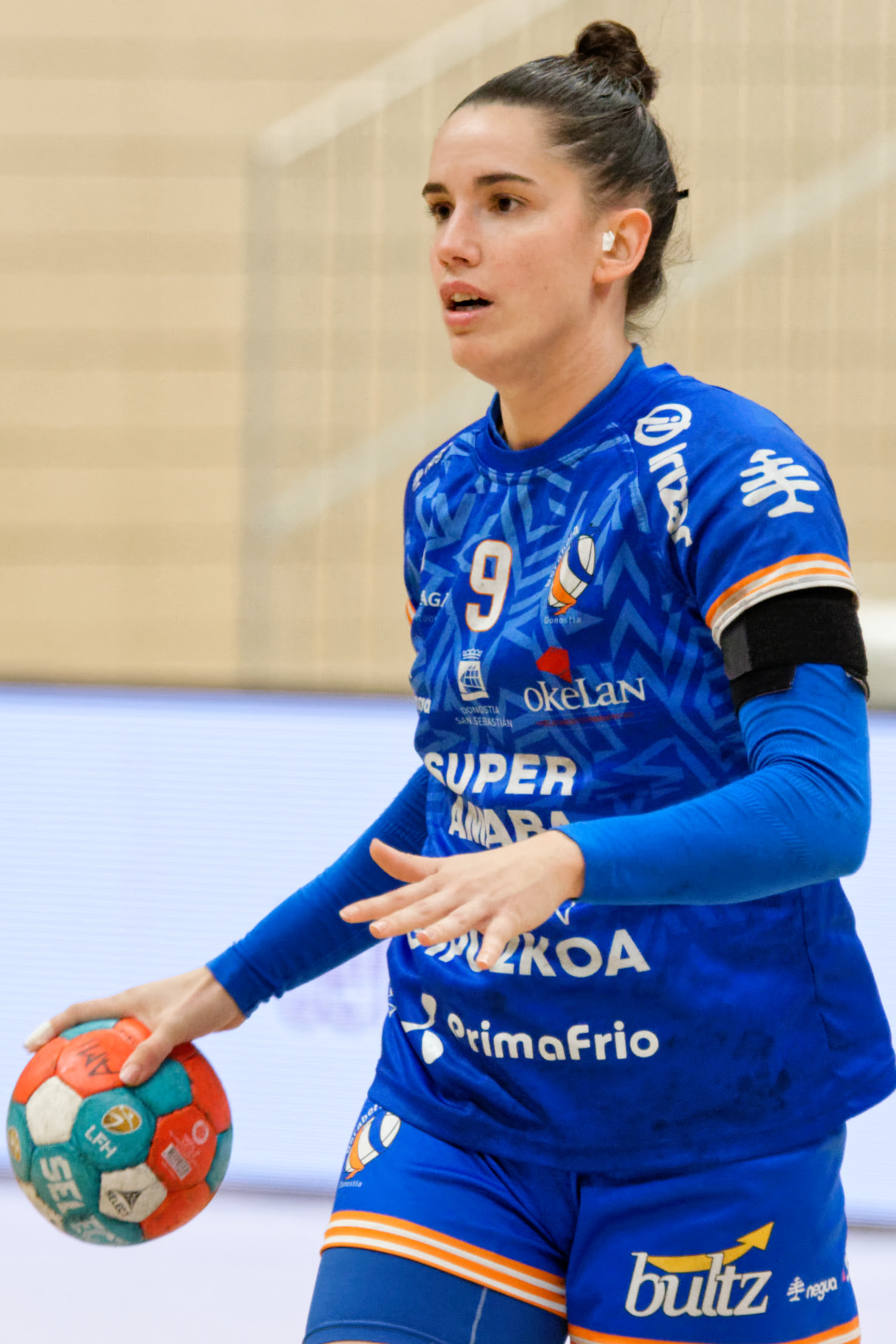

Personal information
- Full name: Emma Boada Coronado
- Nationality: Spanish
- Born: 15 June 1994 (age 32) Barcelona, Catalonia
- Height: 1.75 m (5 ft 9 in)

Sport
- Sport: Handball
- Position: Centre Back
- Current club: Rincón Fertilidad Málaga
- Number: 10

Senior clubs
- Years: Team
- 2012–2015: Esportiu Castelldefels
- 2015–2017: Helvetia Alcobendas
- 2017–: Rincón Fertilidad Málaga
National team
Years	Team	Apps	(Gls)
2018–	Spain	7	(11)
Medal record
Mediterranean Games
Gold medal – first place	2018 Tarragona	Team

Emma Boada Coronado (born 22 August 1994) is a Spanish female handballer for Rincón Fertilidad Málaga and the Spanish national team.

She won the gold medal at the 2018 Mediterranean Games.
