= Andrea de la Torre =

Spanish handball player (born 1990)

Personal information
- Full name: Andrea de la Torre Pérez
- Nationality: Spanish
- Born: 22 August 1990 (age 36) Valldoreix, Spain
- Height: 1.71 m (5 ft 7 in)

Sport
- Sport: Handball
- Position: Goalkeeper
- Current club: Retired
- Number: 12

Senior clubs
- Years: Team
- 2006–2011: Esportiu Castelldefels
- 2011–2019: KH-7 Granollers
National team
Years	Team	Apps	(Gls)
2007–2019	Spain	45	(1)
Medal record
Mediterranean Games
Gold medal – first place	2018 Tarragona	Team
Campeonato España
Gold medal – first place	2014 Oviedo	Team
Campeonato Europa Juvenil
Silver medal – second place	2007 Bratislava	Team
Campeonato España
Silver medal – second place	2006 Granada	Team

Andrea de la Torre Pérez (born 22 August 1990) is a Spanish female former handballer who played for Esportiu Castelldefels and KH-7 Granollers and the Spanish national team.

De la Torre won the gold medal at the 2018 Mediterranean Games.
