= Judith Sans =

Spanish handball player (born 1994)

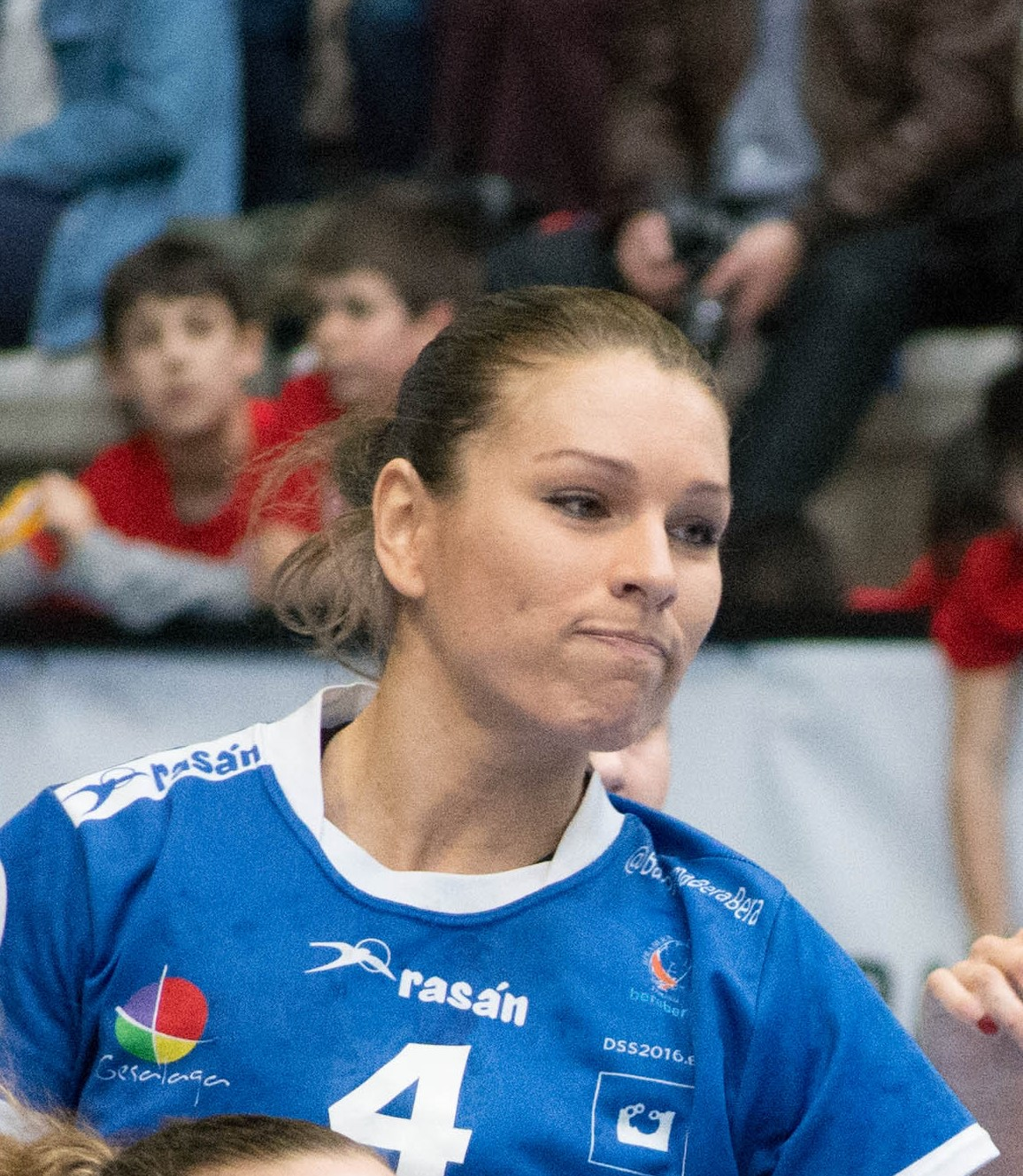

Personal information
- Full name: Judith Sans Serra
- Nationality: Spanish
- Born: 31 March 1994 (age 32) Ascó, Spain
- Height: 1.75 m (5 ft 9 in)

Sport
- Sport: Handball
- Position: Pivot
- Current club: BM Bera Bera
- Number: 4

Senior clubs
- Years: Team
- –2014: CH Esportiu Castelldefels
- 2014–2015: Helvetia Balonmano Alcobendas
- 2015–2017: BM Bera Bera
- 2017–2018: FC Midtjylland Håndbold
- 2018–: BM Bera Bera
National team
Years	Team	Apps	(Gls)
2016–	Spain	26	(22)
Medal record
Mediterranean Games
Gold medal – first place	2018 Tarragona	Team

Judith Sans Serra (born 31 March 1994) is a Spanish handball player for BM Bera Bera and the Spanish national team.

She was part of the team at the 2016 European Women's Handball Championship.
