= Mario Galiano =

Spanish professional golfer (born 1995)

Personal information
- Full name: Mario Galiano Aguilar
- Nationality: Spain
- Born: 7 April 1995 (age 31) Cádiz, Spain

Career
- Sport: Golf
- Turned professional: 2017
- Current tour: Alps Tour
- Former tours: Challenge Tour; PGA Tour Latinoamérica
- Professional wins: 1

Achievements and awards
- European Amateur Golfer of the Year: 2014
Medal record
Mediterranean Games
Gold medal – first place	2018 Tarragona	Individual
Gold medal – first place	2018 Tarragona	Men's team

Mario Galiano Aguilar (born 7 April 1995) is a Spanish professional golfer. In 2014, he was the top-ranked amateur in Europe and named European Amateur Golfer of the Year.

== Early life and amateur career ==
Galiano is from Cádiz in Andalusia. Attached to La Cañada Golf Club, as a junior he won the Copa Nacional Puerta de Hierro, a prestigious event played since 1915, back-to-back in 2011 and 2012, and the Spanish International Junior in 2013.

He became a member of the Spanish national team at the age of 17, and played in the European Boys' Team Championship twice and the European Amateur Team Championship three times, including winning the 2014 European Amateur Team Championship alongside Pep Anglès and Jon Rahm. Together with Rahm and Daniel Berna, he finished 3rd at the 2014 Eisenhower Trophy in Japan. He played for Europe six times and helped win the 2014 Jacques Léglise Trophy and the Bonallack Trophy, both in 2014 and 2016.

In 2014, Galiano won both the Campeonato de Madrid and Campeonato de Barcelona. He finished second in the European Nations Cup – Copa Sotogrande, and was runner-up at the Campeonato de España Absoluto, behind only Jon Rahm. He was named EGA Men's European Amateur of the Year ahead of fellow medalists Marcus Kinhult and Renato Paratore. He succeeded Matt Fitzpatrick, and was in turn succeeded by Jon Rahm in 2015.

== Professional career ==
Galiano turned professional in May 2017 and joined the Challenge Tour, where his best finish his rookie season was a tie for 11th at the D+D Real Czech Challenge.

In 2018, he joined the PGA Tour Latinoamérica where he recorded four top-10 finishes, including a tie for 6th at the Quito Open and a tie for 4th at the Brazil Open. He won the individual gold at the 2018 Mediterranean Games in Tarragona, as well as the team gold alongside Iván Cantero and Álvaro Velasco.

In 2022 he joined the Alps Tour, where he soon won his first event, the 2024 Hauts de France – Pas de Calais Golf Open at Saint-Omer Golf Club. In 2026, he recorded four top-3 finishes.

== Amateur wins ==
- 2011 Copa Nacional Puerta de Hierro
- 2012 Copa Nacional Puerta de Hierro
- 2013 Campeonato de Baleares, Campeonato Internacional de Espana Junior
- 2014 Campeonato de Madrid, Campeonato de Barcelona
- 2015 Copa Baleares, European Nations Cup – Copa Sotogrande, Copa Nacional Puerta de Hierro

== Professional wins (1) ==
=== Alps Tour wins (1) ===
No.	Date	Tournament	Winning score	Margin of victory	Runners-up
1	15 Sep 2024	Hauts de France – Pas de Calais Golf Open	−4 (70-68=138) (Note: Shortened to 36 holes due to weather.)	2 strokes	(France) Nicolas Aparicio, (Spain) Álvaro Hernández Cabezuela, (France) Benjamin Kédochim, (United States) Brandon Kewalramani, (France) Aaron van Hauwe

== Team appearances ==
Amateur

- Junior Golf World Cup (representing Spain): 2012
- European Boys' Team Championship (representing Spain): 2012, 2013
- Jacques Léglise Trophy (representing the Continent of Europe): 2012 (winners), 2013
- European Nations Cup – Copa Sotogrande (representing Spain): 2013, 2014, 2015
- St Andrews Trophy (representing the Continent of Europe): 2014, 2016
- Bonallack Trophy (representing Europe): 2014 (winners), 2016 (winners)
- European Amateur Team Championship (representing Spain): 2014, 2015, 2016
- Eisenhower Trophy (representing Spain): 2014, 2016
