= Paula García Ávila =

Spanish handball player (born 1992)

Paula Ávila
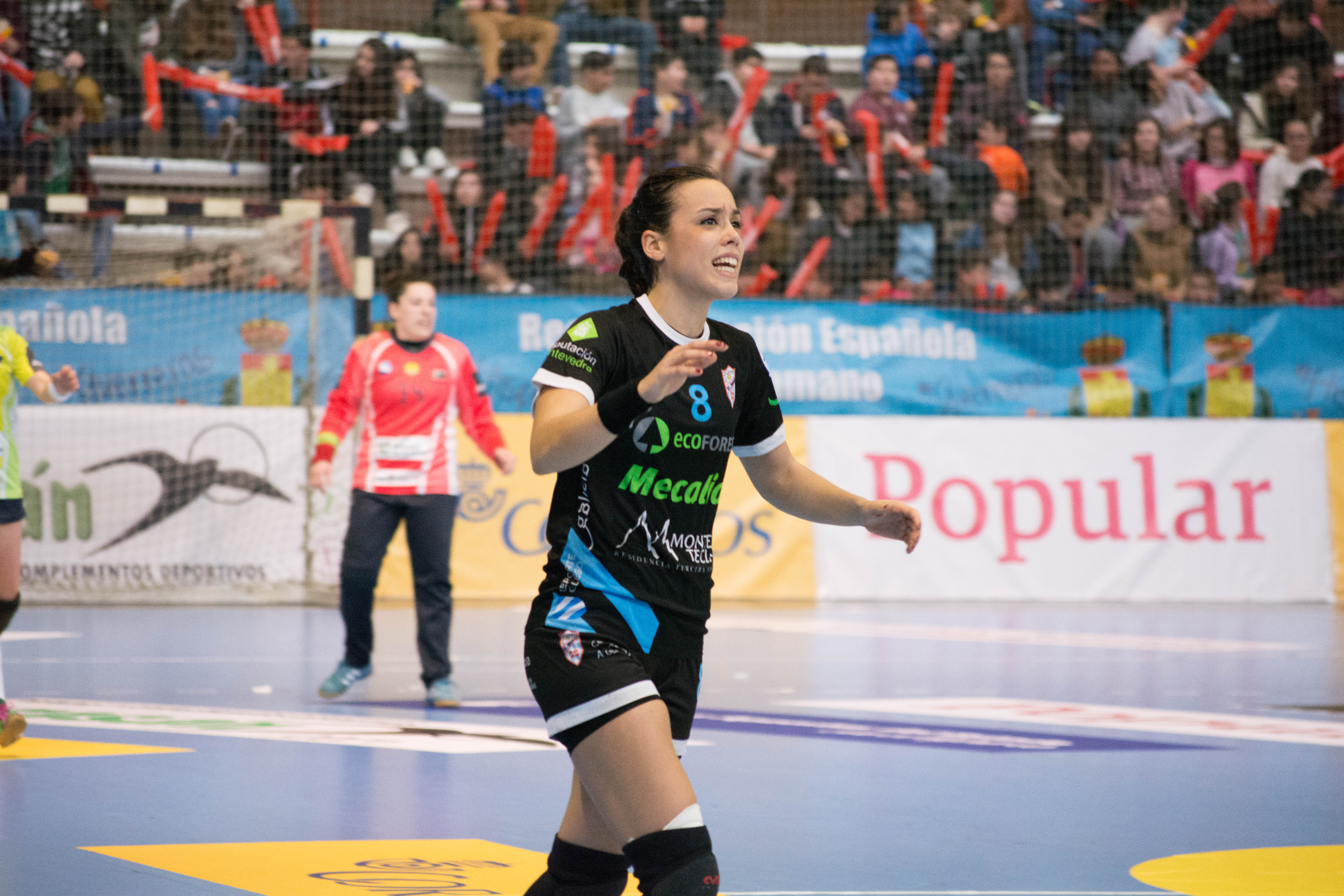

Personal information
- Full name: Paula García Ávila
- Nationality: Spanish
- Born: 24 March 1992 (age 34) Almuñécar, Spain
- Height: 1.80 m (5 ft 11 in)

Sport
- Sport: Handball
- Position: Pivot
- Current club: Costa del Sol Malaga

Senior clubs
- Years: Team
- 2010–2012: BM Elda Prestigio
- 2012–2014: Helvetia BM Alcobendas
- 2014–2015: Union Mios Biganos-Bègles
- 2015–2016: Mecalia Atlético Guardés
- 2017–2018: Rincón Fertilidad Málaga
- 2018–2019: Gloria Bistrița
- 2019–: Costa del Sol Malaga
National team
| Years | Team | Apps | (Gls) |
| 2017– | Spain | 35 | (39) |
Medal record
Mediterranean Games
| Gold medal – first place | 2018 Tarragona | Team |

Paula García Ávila (born 24 March 1992) is a Spanish handballer for Costa del Sol Malaga and the Spanish national team.

== International honours ==
- EHF Challenge Cup:
  - Winner: 2015, Winner: 2021
