= 2025 Palermo Ladies Open – Singles =

Singles
- 2025 Palermo Ladies Open

Final
- Champion: (United Kingdom) Francesca Jones
- Runner-up: (Netherlands) Anouk Koevermans
- Score: 6–3, 6–2

Details
- Draw: 32
- Seeds: 8

Events
Singles	Doubles
← 2024 ·	Palermo Ladies Open	· 2026 →

Francesca Jones won the singles title at the 2025 Palermo Ladies Open, defeating Anouk Koevermans 6-3, 6–2 in the final. It was her second WTA 125 title and came just two weeks after her first at Contrexéville.

Zheng Qinwen was the two-time reigning champion, but did not participate this year.

== Seeds ==
1. (Egypt) Mayar Sherif (second round, withdrew)
2. (Switzerland) Jil Teichmann (withdrew)
3. (United Kingdom) Francesca Jones (champion)
4. (Latvia) Darja Semeņistaja (second round)
5. (Switzerland) Simona Waltert (first round)
6. (Andorra) Victoria Jiménez Kasintseva (first round)
7. (Spain) Leyre Romero Gormaz (first round)
8. (Slovenia) Veronika Erjavec (first round)
9. (Austria) Julia Grabher (semifinals)

== Draw ==
Key

- Q = Qualifier
- WC = Wild card
- LL = Lucky loser
- Alt = Alternate
- ITF = ITF entry
- PR = Protected ranking
- SR = Special ranking
- SE = Special exempt
- JE = Junior exempt
- JR = Junior Accelerator Programme entrant
- CO = College Accelerator Programme entrant
- NG = Next Gen Accelerator Program entrant
- w/o = Walkover
- r = Retired
- d = Defaulted

=== Finals ===
Semifinals
Tatiana Prozorova	5	2
3	(United Kingdom) Francesca Jones	7	6
(Netherlands) Anouk Koevermans	6	3	6
9	(Austria) Julia Grabher	4	6	4

Final
3	(United Kingdom) Francesca Jones	6	6
(Netherlands) Anouk Koevermans	3	2

=== Top half ===
First round
1	(Egypt) M Sherif	6	6
LL	(Spain) Á Fita Boluda	2	4
(Belgium) H Vandewinkel	6	6
WC	(Italy) D Spiteri	4	4
(Liechtenstein) K von Deichmann	7^{7}	1	6
(Argentina) J Riera	6^{3}	6	2
T Prozorova	7^{7}	6
6	(Andorra) V Jiménez Kasintseva	6^{5}	4
3	(United Kingdom) F Jones	6	6
(France) C Paquet	3	1
O Selekhmeteva	6	6
WC	(Italy) G Pedone	1	4
Q	(Slovakia) R Jamrichová	6	6
LL	(Italy) A Zantedeschi	1	1
(Hungary) P Udvardy	6	6
8	(Slovenia) V Erjavec	1	1

Second round
1	(Egypt) M Sherif
(Belgium) H Vandewinkel	w/o
(Liechtenstein) K von Deichmann	6	2	1
T Prozorova	4	6	6
3	(United Kingdom) F Jones	6	6
O Selekhmeteva	4	3
Q	(Slovakia) R Jamrichová	4	5
(Hungary) P Udvardy	6	7

Quarterfinals
(Belgium) H Vandewinkel	5	7	1
T Prozorova	7	5	6
3	(United Kingdom) F Jones	6	6
(Hungary) P Udvardy	2	3

Semifinals
T Prozorova	5	2
3	(United Kingdom) F Jones	7	6

=== Bottom half ===
First round
5	(Switzerland) S Waltert	4	0
(Romania) M Bulgaru	6	6
Q	(Spain) K Quevedo	6	2	7^{7}
(Serbia) L Radivojević	2	6	6^{2}
(Netherlands) A Koevermans	3	6	6
Q	(France) A Ramé	6	4	4
(Germany) J Niemeier	6	2	3
4	(Latvia) D Semeņistaja	4	6	6
7	(Spain) L Romero Gormaz	4	2
WC	(Italy) S Ambrosio	6	6
WC	(Italy) TC Grant	4	6^{5}
SE	(Slovenia) T Zidanšek	6	7^{7}
PR	(United States) C Liu	3	6^{3}
Q	(Spain) C Martínez Círez	6	7^{7}
(Croatia) T Würth	2	4
9	(Austria) J Grabher	6	6

Second round
(Romania) M Bulgaru	5	6^{7}
Q	(Spain) K Quevedo	7	7^{9}
(Netherlands) A Koevermans	6	1	7
4	(Latvia) D Semeņistaja	2	6	5
WC	(Italy) S Ambrosio	2	6^{3}
SE	(Slovenia) T Zidanšek	6	7^{7}
Q	(Spain) C Martínez Círez	0	0^{r}
9	(Austria) J Grabher	6	4

Quarterfinals
Q	(Spain) K Quevedo	4	1
(Netherlands) A Koevermans	6	6
SE	(Slovenia) T Zidanšek	4	3
9	(Austria) J Grabher	6	6

Semifinals
(Netherlands) A Koevermans	6	3	6
9	(Austria) J Grabher	4	6	4

== Qualifying ==
=== Seeds ===
1. (Slovenia) Tamara Zidanšek (special exempt to main draw)
2. (Spain) Ángela Fita Boluda (qualifying competition, lucky loser)
3. (Spain) Kaitlin Quevedo (qualified)
4. (Spain) Carlota Martínez Círez (qualified)
5. (France) Julie Belgraver (first round)
6. (Brazil) Carolina Alves (qualifying competition)
7. (France) Séléna Janicijevic (qualifying competition)
8. (France) Alice Ramé (qualified)

=== Qualifiers ===
1. (Slovakia) Renáta Jamrichová
2. (France) Alice Ramé
3. (Spain) Kaitlin Quevedo
4. (Spain) Carlota Martínez Círez

=== Lucky losers ===
1. (Spain) Ángela Fita Boluda
2. (Italy) Aurora Zantedeschi

=== Qualifying draw ===
==== First qualifier ====
First round
Alt	(Czech Republic) Michaela Bayerlová	2	2
(Italy) Aurora Zantedeschi	6	6
(Slovakia) Renáta Jamrichová	7	6
5	(France) Julie Belgraver	5	4

Qualifying competition
(Italy) Aurora Zantedeschi	0	7^{7}	2
(Slovakia) Renáta Jamrichová	6	6^{5}	6

==== Second qualifier ====
First round
2	(Spain) Ángela Fita Boluda	6	6
(Japan) Ayano Shimizu	0	1
(Bolivia) Noelia Zeballos	1	5
8	(France) Alice Ramé	6	7

Qualifying competition
2	(Spain) Ángela Fita Boluda	5	3
8	(France) Alice Ramé	7	6

==== Third qualifier ====
First round
3	(Spain) Kaitlin Quevedo	6	0
(Japan) Momoko Kobori	3	0^{r}
WC	(Italy) Alessandra Mazzola	6	6^{5}	6
7	(France) Séléna Janicijevic	2	7^{7}	2

Qualifying competition
3	(Spain) Kaitlin Quevedo	6	6
WC	(Italy) Alessandra Mazzola	4	2

==== Fourth qualifier ====
First round
4	(Spain) Carlota Martínez Círez	6	6
Amina Anshba	2	0
WC	(Italy) Anastasia Bertacchi	2	2
6	(Brazil) Carolina Alves	6	6

Qualifying competition
4	(Spain) Carlota Martínez Círez	6	6
6	(Brazil) Carolina Alves	4	4
