= 2025 Palermo Ladies Open – Doubles =

Doubles
- 2025 Palermo Ladies Open

Final
- Champions: (France) Estelle Cascino (China) Feng Shuo
- Runners-up: (Japan) Momoko Kobori (Japan) Ayano Shimizu
- Score: 6–2, 6–7^{(2–7)}, [10–7]

Details
- Draw: 16
- Seeds: 4

Events
Singles	Doubles
← 2024 ·	Palermo Ladies Open	· 2026 →

Estelle Cascino and Feng Shuo won the doubles title at the 2025 Palermo Ladies Open, defeating Momoko Kobori and Ayano Shimizu in the final, 6–2, 6–7^{(2–7)}, [10–7].

Alexandra Panova and Yana Sizikova were the reigning champions, but did not participate this year.

== Seeds ==
1. (Japan) Momoko Kobori / (Japan) Ayano Shimizu (final)
2. (Chinese Taipei) Cho I-hsuan / (Chinese Taipei) Cho Yi-tsen (semifinals)
3. (France) Estelle Cascino / (China) Feng Shuo (champions)
4. (Algeria) Inès Ibbou / (Switzerland) Naïma Karamoko (first round)

== Draw ==
=== Key ===
- Q = Qualifier
- WC = Wild card
- LL = Lucky loser
- Alt = Alternate
- ITF = ITF entry
- PR = Protected ranking
- SR = Special ranking
- SE = Special exempt
- JE = Junior exempt
- JR = Junior Accelerator Programme entrant
- CO = College Accelerator Programme entrant
- NG = Next Gen Accelerator Program entrant
- w/o = Walkover
- r = Retired
- d = Defaulted

=== Draw ===
First round
(Italy) A Abbagnato (Italy) G Pedone	1	7^{9}	[11]
(Italy) S Ambrosio (Italy) TC Grant	6	6^{7}	[9]
4	(Algeria) I Ibbou (Switzerland) N Karamoko	6^{4}	3
(India) R Bhosale (Thailand) P Plipuech	7^{7}	6
(Slovakia) R Jamrichová (Croatia) T Würth	6	6
(Ukraine) M Kolb (Ukraine) N Kolb	0	3
(United Kingdom) F Christie (Bosnia and Herzegovina) A Wagner
A Anshba; T Prozorova	w/o
(Slovenia) V Erjavec (Slovenia) K Novak	4	4
3	(France) E Cascino (China) S Feng	6	6
(Argentina) J Riera (Italy) A Zantedeschi
(Italy) M Tona (Bolivia) N Zeballos	w/o
(Czech Republic) M Bayerlová (Czech Republic) I Šebestová	6^{9}	4
2	(Chinese Taipei) I-h Cho (Chinese Taipei) Y-t Cho	7^{11}	6

Quarterfinals
1	(Japan) M Kobori (Japan) A Shimizu	0	6	[10]
(Italy) A Abbagnato (Italy) G Pedone	6	4	[6]
(India) R Bhosale (Thailand) P Plipuech	5	4
(Slovakia) R Jamrichová (Croatia) T Würth	7	6
A Anshba; T Prozorova	6	4	[7]
3	(France) E Cascino (China) S Feng	4	6	[10]
(Italy) M Tona (Bolivia) N Zeballos	3	2
2	(Chinese Taipei) I-h Cho (Chinese Taipei) Y-t Cho	6	6

Semifinals
1	(Japan) M Kobori (Japan) A Shimizu	7	6
(Slovakia) R Jamrichová (Croatia) T Würth	5	4
3	(France) E Cascino (China) S Feng	6	6
2	(Chinese Taipei) I-h Cho (Chinese Taipei) Y-t Cho	3	3

Final
1	(Japan) M Kobori (Japan) A Shimizu	2	7^{7}	[7]
3	(France) E Cascino (China) S Feng	6	6^{2}	[10]
