= 2021 Wimbledon Championships =

Tennis tournament

- Date: 28 June – 11 July
- Edition: 134th
- Category: Grand Slam (ITF)
- Prize money: £35,016,000
- Surface: Grass
- Location: Church Road; SW19, Wimbledon, London, United Kingdom
- Venue: All England Lawn Tennis and Croquet Club

Champions

Men's singles
- (Serbia) Novak Djokovic

Women's singles
- (Australia) Ashleigh Barty

Men's doubles
- (Croatia) Nikola Mektić / (Croatia) Mate Pavić

Women's doubles
- (Chinese Taipei) Hsieh Su-wei / (Belgium) Elise Mertens

Mixed doubles
- (United Kingdom) Neal Skupski / (United States) Desirae Krawczyk

Wheelchair men's singles
- (Belgium) Joachim Gérard

Wheelchair women's singles
- (Netherlands) Diede de Groot

Wheelchair quad singles
- (Australia) Dylan Alcott

Wheelchair men's doubles
- (United Kingdom) Alfie Hewett / (United Kingdom) Gordon Reid

Wheelchair women's doubles
- (Japan) Yui Kamiji / (United Kingdom) Jordanne Whiley

Wheelchair quad doubles
- (United Kingdom) Andy Lapthorne / (United States) David Wagner

Boys' singles
- (United States) Samir Banerjee

Girls' singles
- (Spain) Ane Mintegi del Olmo

Boys' doubles
- (Lithuania) Edas Butvilas / (Spain) Alejandro Manzanera Pertusa

Girls' doubles
- (Belarus) Kristina Dmitruk / (Russia) Diana Shnaider
- Wimbledon Championships

The 2021 Wimbledon Championships was a Grand Slam tennis tournament that took place at the All England Lawn Tennis and Croquet Club in Wimbledon, London, United Kingdom, the first since 2019 due to the COVID-19 pandemic. Novak Djokovic successfully defended his gentlemen's singles title to claim his record-equalling 20th major title, defeating Matteo Berrettini in the final. Simona Halep was the defending ladies' singles champion from 2019, but she withdrew from the competition due to a calf injury. The Ladies' Singles title was won by Ashleigh Barty, who defeated Karolína Plíšková in the final.

Following the cancellation of the 2020 tournament because of the COVID-19 pandemic, the main tournament began on Monday 28 June 2021 and finished on Sunday 11 July 2021. The 2021 Championships were the 134th edition, the 127th staging of the ladies' singles Championship event, the 53rd in the Open Era and the third Grand Slam tournament of the year. It was played on grass courts and was part of the ATP Tour, the WTA Tour, the ITF Junior Circuit and the ITF Wheelchair Tennis Tour. The tournament was organised by the All England Lawn Tennis Club and International Tennis Federation.

This was the final edition of Wimbledon to have no matches scheduled on "Middle Sunday." It would also be the final competitive tournament for eight-time champion Roger Federer.

== Tournament ==
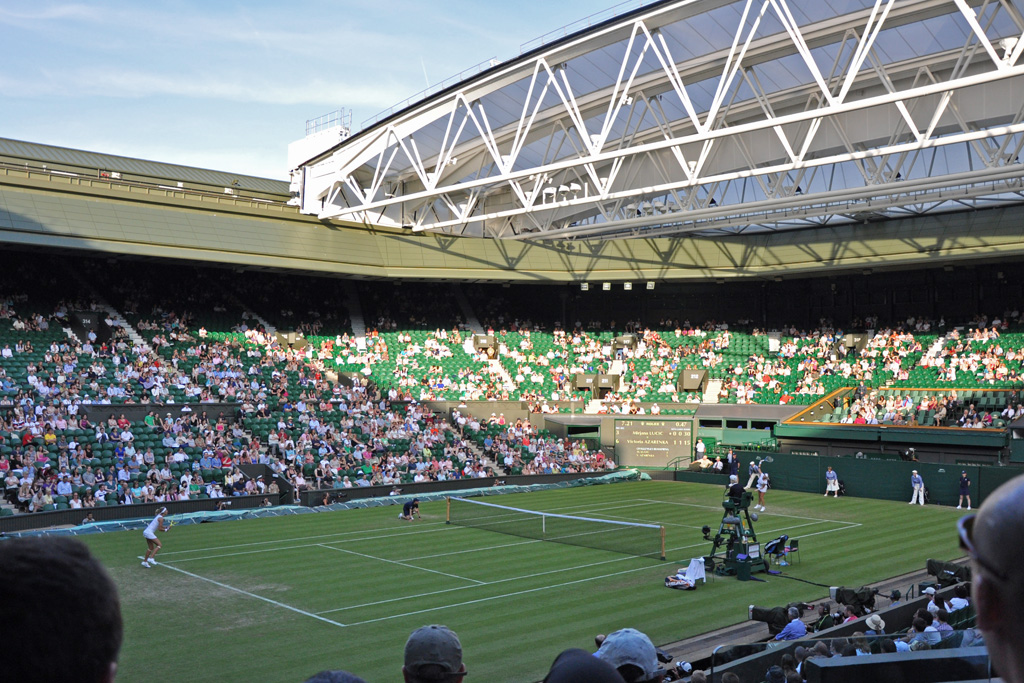
Centre Court, where the finals took place

The 2021 Wimbledon Championships were the 134th edition of the tournament and were held at the All England Lawn Tennis and Croquet Club in London. The Championships were initially held at 50% capacity, before increasing to full capacity in the second week. Spectators were required to have tested negative for COVID-19 within 48 hours prior to attendance or to be fully vaccinated.

The tournament was run by the International Tennis Federation (ITF) and is included in the 2021 ATP Tour and the 2021 WTA Tour calendars under the Grand Slam category. The tournament consisted of men's (singles and doubles), women's (singles and doubles), mixed doubles, boys (under 18 – singles and doubles) and girls (under 18 – singles and doubles), which were also a part of the Grade A category of tournaments for under 18, and singles & doubles events for men's and women's wheelchair tennis players as part of the Uniqlo Tour under the Grand Slam category, also hosting singles and doubles events for wheelchair quad tennis for the first time.

The tournament was played on grass courts; main draw matches were played at the All England Lawn Tennis and Croquet Club, Wimbledon. Qualifying matches were played, from Monday 21 June to Friday 25 June 2021, at the Bank of England Sports Ground, Roehampton. The Tennis Sub-Committee met to decide wild card entries on 14 June.

The gentlemen's seedings formula used since 2002 was not used. Seedings used the standard system based on ATP rankings.

No invitation doubles events were held during this edition of the tournament.

== Singles players ==
Gentlemen's singles

Champion		Runner-up	
(Serbia) Novak Djokovic [1]		(Italy) Matteo Berrettini [7]	
Semifinals out
(Canada) Denis Shapovalov [10]		(Poland) Hubert Hurkacz [14]	
Quarterfinals out
(Hungary) Márton Fucsovics	(Russia) Karen Khachanov [25]	(Canada) Félix Auger-Aliassime [16]	(Switzerland) Roger Federer [6]
4th round out
(Chile) Cristian Garín [17]	(Russia) Andrey Rublev [5]	(United States) Sebastian Korda	(Spain) Roberto Bautista Agut [8]
(Belarus) Ilya Ivashka	(Germany) Alexander Zverev [4]	(Italy) Lorenzo Sonego [23]	(Russia) Daniil Medvedev [2]
3rd round out
(United States) Denis Kudla (Q)	(Spain) Pedro Martínez	(Argentina) Diego Schwartzman [9]	(Italy) Fabio Fognini [26]
(United States) Frances Tiafoe	(United Kingdom) Dan Evans [22]	(United Kingdom) Andy Murray (WC)	(Germany) Dominik Koepfer
(Slovenia) Aljaž Bedene	(Australia) Jordan Thompson	(Australia) Nick Kyrgios	(United States) Taylor Fritz [31]
(United Kingdom) Cameron Norrie [29]	(Australia) James Duckworth	(Kazakhstan) Alexander Bublik	(Croatia) Marin Čilić [32]
2nd round out
(South Africa) Kevin Anderson	(Italy) Andreas Seppi	(Australia) Marc Polmans (Q)	(France) Gaël Monfils [13]
(United Kingdom) Liam Broady (WC)	(Czech Republic) Jiří Veselý	(Serbia) Laslo Đere	(South Africa) Lloyd Harris
(Canada) Vasek Pospisil	(Belarus) Egor Gerasimov	(Serbia) Dušan Lajović	(France) Antoine Hoang (Q)
(Spain) Pablo Andújar	(Germany) Oscar Otte (Q)	(South Korea) Kwon Soon-woo	(Serbia) Miomir Kecmanović
(Netherlands) Botic van de Zandschulp (LL)	(Japan) Yoshihito Nishioka	(France) Jérémy Chardy	(Japan) Kei Nishikori
(Sweden) Mikael Ymer	(Italy) Gianluca Mager	(United States) Steve Johnson	(United States) Tennys Sandgren
(France) Richard Gasquet	(Australia) Alex Bolt (WC)	(Colombia) Daniel Elahi Galán	(United States) Sam Querrey
(United States) Marcos Giron	(Bulgaria) Grigor Dimitrov [18]	(France) Benjamin Bonzi (Q)	(Spain) Carlos Alcaraz (WC)
1st round out
(United Kingdom) Jack Draper (WC)	(Chile) Marcelo Tomás Barrios Vera (Q)	(Portugal) João Sousa	(Spain) Alejandro Davidovich Fokina [30]
(Spain) Bernabé Zapata Miralles (Q)	(Chinese Taipei) Lu Yen-hsun (PR)	(Italy) Stefano Travaglia	(Australia) Christopher O'Connell (Q)
(France) Benoît Paire	(Italy) Marco Cecchinato	(Germany) Yannick Hanfmann	(Italy) Jannik Sinner [19]
(Spain) Albert Ramos Viñolas	(Uruguay) Pablo Cuevas	(Lithuania) Ričardas Berankis	(Argentina) Federico Delbonis
(Greece) Stefanos Tsitsipas [3]	(Spain) Roberto Carballés Baena	(United Kingdom) Jay Clarke (WC)	(United States) Mackenzie McDonald (Q)
(Spain) Feliciano López	(France) Gilles Simon	(China) Zhang Zhizhen (Q)	(Australia) Alex de Minaur [15]
(Germany) Philipp Kohlschreiber (PR)	(France) Pierre-Hugues Herbert	(France) Arthur Rinderknech (Q)	(Georgia (country)) Nikoloz Basilashvili [24]
(United States) Reilly Opelka [27]	(Germany) Daniel Masur (Q)	(Argentina) Facundo Bagnis	(Australia) John Millman
(Argentina) Guido Pella	(France) Grégoire Barrère (Q)	(France) Corentin Moutet	(United States) John Isner [28]
(Russia) Aslan Karatsev [20]	(Spain) Jaume Munar	(Australia) Alexei Popyrin	(Norway) Casper Ruud [12]
(Brazil) Thiago Monteiro	(France) Jo-Wilfried Tsonga	(Argentina) Juan Ignacio Londero	(France) Ugo Humbert [21]
(United States) Brandon Nakashima (Q)	(Austria) Dennis Novak	(Slovakia) Norbert Gombos	(Netherlands) Tallon Griekspoor (Q)
(France) Adrian Mannarino	(Japan) Yūichi Sugita	(Serbia) Filip Krajinović	(France) Lucas Pouille
(Portugal) Pedro Sousa	(Argentina) Federico Coria	(Moldova) Radu Albot	(Spain) Pablo Carreño Busta [11]
(Italy) Lorenzo Musetti	(Finland) Emil Ruusuvuori	(Kazakhstan) Mikhail Kukushkin	(Spain) Fernando Verdasco
(Italy) Salvatore Caruso	(Argentina) Marco Trungelliti (Q)	(Japan) Yasutaka Uchiyama (LL)	(Germany) Jan-Lennard Struff

Ladies' singles

Champion		Runner-up	
(Australia) Ashleigh Barty [1]		(Czech Republic) Karolína Plíšková [8]	
Semifinals out
(Germany) Angelique Kerber [25]		(Belarus) Aryna Sabalenka [2]	
Quarterfinals out
(Australia) Ajla Tomljanović	(Czech Republic) Karolína Muchová [19]	(Switzerland) Viktorija Golubic	(Tunisia) Ons Jabeur [21]
4th round out
(Czech Republic) Barbora Krejčíková [14]	(United Kingdom) Emma Raducanu (WC)	(Spain) Paula Badosa [30]	(United States) Coco Gauff [20]
(Russia) Liudmila Samsonova (WC)	(United States) Madison Keys [23]	(Poland) Iga Świątek [7]	(Kazakhstan) Elena Rybakina [18]
3rd round out
(Czech Republic) Kateřina Siniaková	(Latvia) Anastasija Sevastova	(Romania) Sorana Cîrstea	(Latvia) Jeļena Ostapenko
(Poland) Magda Linette	(Russia) Anastasia Pavlyuchenkova [16]	(Slovenia) Kaja Juvan	(Belarus) Aliaksandra Sasnovich
(Czech Republic) Tereza Martincová	(United States) Sloane Stephens	(Belgium) Elise Mertens [13]	(United States) Madison Brengle
(Romania) Irina-Camelia Begu	(Spain) Garbiñe Muguruza [11]	(United States) Shelby Rogers	(Colombia) Camila Osorio (Q)
2nd round out
(Russia) Anna Blinkova	(United States) CoCo Vandeweghe (PR)	(Ukraine) Marta Kostyuk	(Germany) Andrea Petkovic (PR)
(Belarus) Victoria Azarenka [12]	(Czech Republic) Markéta Vondroušová	(Russia) Daria Kasatkina [31]	(France) Alizé Cornet
(Ukraine) Elina Svitolina [3]	(Kazakhstan) Yulia Putintseva	(Italy) Camila Giorgi	(Czech Republic) Kristýna Plíšková
(France) Clara Burel (Q)	(Russia) Elena Vesnina (PR)	(Spain) Sara Sorribes Tormo	(Japan) Nao Hibino
(Croatia) Donna Vekić	(Argentina) Nadia Podoroska	(United States) Jessica Pegula [22]	(United States) Kristie Ahn (LL)
(China) Zhu Lin	(United States) Lauren Davis	(United States) Danielle Collins	(United States) Sofia Kenin [4]
(Russia) Vera Zvonareva	(Croatia) Petra Martić [26]	(United States) Venus Williams	(Netherlands) Lesley Pattinama Kerkhove (Q)
(Greece) Maria Sakkari [15]	(United States) Claire Liu (Q)	(Russia) Ekaterina Alexandrova [32]	(United Kingdom) Katie Boulter (WC)
1st round out
(Spain) Carla Suárez Navarro (PR)	(Hungary) Tímea Babos	(Belarus) Olga Govortsova (Q)	(China) Wang Yafan (LL)
(Netherlands) Kiki Bertens [17]	(Kazakhstan) Zarina Diyas	(Italy) Jasmine Paolini	(Denmark) Clara Tauson
(Ukraine) Kateryna Kozlova (PR)	(United Kingdom) Samantha Murray Sharan (WC)	(Russia) Vitalia Diatchenko (Q)	(Estonia) Anett Kontaveit [24]
(Romania) Patricia Maria Țig	(Canada) Leylah Annie Fernandez	(Belgium) Greet Minnen (Q)	(Canada) Bianca Andreescu [5]
(Belgium) Alison Van Uytvanck	(United States) Amanda Anisimova	(Bulgaria) Tsvetana Pironkova (LL)	(Spain) Aliona Bolsova
(China) Zhang Shuai	(Switzerland) Jil Teichmann	(Australia) Astra Sharma (LL)	(Romania) Ana Bogdan
(Switzerland) Belinda Bencic [9]	(Australia) Ellen Perez (Q)	(Italy) Martina Trevisan	(United Kingdom) Francesca Jones (WC)
(Serbia) Nina Stojanović	(Croatia) Ana Konjuh (Q)	(United States) Bernarda Pera	(United States) Serena Williams [6]
(Slovenia) Tamara Zidanšek	(Russia) Anastasia Potapova	(United States) Ann Li	(United States) Alison Riske [28]
(France) Caroline Garcia	(Estonia) Kaia Kanepi	(United Kingdom) Heather Watson	(Czech Republic) Petra Kvitová [10]
(United Kingdom) Harriet Dart (WC)	(Germany) Mona Barthel (PR)	(United Kingdom) Jodie Burrage (WC)	(United Kingdom) Katie Swan (Q)
(Russia) Veronika Kudermetova [29]	(Slovenia) Polona Hercog	(United States) Christina McHale	(China) Wang Xinyu (Q)
(Chinese Taipei) Hsieh Su-wei	(Czech Republic) Marie Bouzková	(United States) Katie Volynets (Q)	(Russia) Varvara Gracheva
(Sweden) Rebecca Peterson	(Romania) Mihaela Buzărnescu (PR)	(Russia) Svetlana Kuznetsova	(France) Fiona Ferro
(Netherlands) Arantxa Rus	(Australia) Samantha Stosur (PR)	(Japan) Misaki Doi	(France) Kristina Mladenovic
(Germany) Laura Siegemund	(Russia) Anna Kalinskaya (Q)	(United States) Danielle Lao (Q)	(Romania) Monica Niculescu (Q)

== Events ==
=== Gentlemen's singles ===
- (Serbia) Novak Djokovic def. (Italy) Matteo Berrettini, 6–7^{(4–7)}, 6–4, 6–4, 6–3

=== Ladies' singles ===
- (Australia) Ashleigh Barty def. (Czech Republic) Karolína Plíšková, 6–3, 6–7^{(4–7)}, 6–3

=== Gentlemen's doubles ===
- (Croatia) Nikola Mektić / (Croatia) Mate Pavić def. (Spain) Marcel Granollers / (Argentina) Horacio Zeballos, 6–4, 7–6^{(7–5)}, 2–6, 7–5

=== Ladies' doubles ===
- (Chinese Taipei) Hsieh Su-wei / (Belgium) Elise Mertens def. (Russia) Veronika Kudermetova / (Russia) Elena Vesnina, 3–6, 7–5, 9–7

=== Mixed doubles ===
- (United Kingdom) Neal Skupski / (United States) Desirae Krawczyk def. (United Kingdom) Joe Salisbury / (United Kingdom) Harriet Dart, 6–2, 7–6^{(7–1)}

=== Wheelchair gentlemen's singles ===
- (Belgium) Joachim Gérard def. (United Kingdom) Gordon Reid, 6–2, 7–6^{(7–2)}

=== Wheelchair ladies' singles ===
- (Netherlands) Diede de Groot def. (South Africa) Kgothatso Montjane, 6–2, 6–2

=== Wheelchair quad singles ===
- (Australia) Dylan Alcott def. (Netherlands) Sam Schröder, 6–2, 6–2

=== Wheelchair gentlemen's doubles ===
- (United Kingdom) Alfie Hewett / (United Kingdom) Gordon Reid def. (Netherlands) Tom Egberink / (Belgium) Joachim Gérard, 7–5, 6–2

=== Wheelchair ladies' doubles ===
- (Japan) Yui Kamiji / (United Kingdom) Jordanne Whiley def. (South Africa) Kgothatso Montjane / (United Kingdom) Lucy Shuker, 6–0, 7–6^{(7–0)}

=== Wheelchair quad doubles ===
- (United Kingdom) Andy Lapthorne / (United States) David Wagner def. (Australia) Dylan Alcott / (Netherlands) Sam Schröder, 6–1, 3–6, 6–4

=== Boys' singles ===
- (United States) Samir Banerjee def. (United States) Victor Lilov, 7–5, 6–3

=== Girls' singles ===
- (Spain) Ane Mintegi del Olmo def. (Germany) Nastasja Schunk, 2–6, 6–4, 6–1

=== Boys' doubles ===
- (Lithuania) Edas Butvilas / (Spain) Alejandro Manzanera Pertusa def. (Spain) Daniel Rincón / (Jordan) Abedallah Shelbayh, 6–3, 6–4

=== Girls' doubles ===
- (Belarus) Kristina Dmitruk / (Russia) Diana Shnaider def. (Belgium) Sofia Costoulas / (Finland) Laura Hietaranta, 6–1, 6–2

== Point distribution and prize money ==
As a Grand Slam tournament, the points for Wimbledon are the highest of all ATP and WTA tournaments. These points determine the world ATP and WTA rankings for men's and women's competition, respectively. Because of the smaller draws and the pandemic, all men's and women's doubles players that made it past the first round received half the points of their singles counterparts, a change from previous years where singles and doubles players received the same number of points in all but the first two rounds. In both singles and doubles, women received slightly higher point totals compared to their male counterparts at each round of the tournament, except for the first and last. Points and rankings for the wheelchair events fall under the jurisdiction of the ITF Wheelchair Tennis Tour, which also places Grand Slams as the highest classification.

The ATP and WTA rankings were both altered in 2020, owing to the COVID-19 pandemic. Both rankings were frozen on 16 March 2020 upon the suspension of both tours, and as a result the traditional 52-week ranking system was extended to cover the period from March 2019 to March 2021 with a player's best 18 results in that time period factoring into their point totals.

- For the ATP, in March 2021, the ATP extended the "best of" logic to their rankings through to the week of 9 August 2021. Players will count either their 2021 points or 50% of their 2019 points, whichever is greater.
- For the WTA, their 2019 points will drop off at 2021 edition.

=== Point distribution ===
Below are the tables with the point distribution for each phase of the tournament.

==== Senior points ====
Event	W	F	SF	QF	Round of 16	Round of 32	Round of 64	Round of 128	Q	Q3	Q2	Q1
Men's singles	2000	1200	720	360	180	90	45	10	25	16	8	0
Men's doubles	2000	1200	720	360	180	90	0	—	—	—	—	—
Women's singles	2000	1300	780	430	240	130	70	10	40	30	20	2
Women's doubles	2000	1300	780	430	240	130	10	—	—	—	—	—

==== Wheelchair points ====
Event	W	F	SF/3rd	QF/4th
Singles	800	500	375	100
Doubles	800	500	100	—N/a
Quad singles	800	500	100	—N/a
Quad doubles	800	100	—N/a	—N/a

==== Junior points ====
Event	W	F	SF	QF	Round of 16	Round of 32	Q	Q3
Boys' singles	1000	600	370	200	100	45	30	20
Girls' singles	1000	600	370	200	100	45	30	20
Boys' doubles	750	450	275	150	75	—N/a	—N/a	—N/a
Girls' doubles	750	450	275	150	75	—N/a	—N/a	—N/a

=== Prize money ===
The Wimbledon Championships total prize money for 2021 decreased by 7.85% to £35,016,000. However, the prize money figure does not include the substantial investment required to provide quality accommodation for the players, or to create a minimised risk environment and comprehensive testing programme.

Event	W	F	SF	QF	Round of 16	Round of 32	Round of 64	Round of 128	Q3	Q2	Q1
Singles	£1,700,000	£900,000	£465,000	£300,000	£181,000	£115,000	£75,000	£48,000	£25,500	£15,500	£8,500
Doubles *	£480,000	£240,000	£120,000	£60,000	£30,000	£19,000	£12,000	—N/a	—N/a	—N/a	—N/a
Mixed doubles *	£100,000	£50,000	£25,000	£12,000	£6,000	£3,000	£1,500	—N/a	—N/a	—N/a	—N/a
Wheelchair singles	£48,000	£24,000	£16,500	£11,500	—N/a	—N/a	—N/a	—N/a	—N/a	—N/a	—N/a
Wheelchair doubles *	£20,000	£10,000	£6,000	—N/a	—N/a	—N/a	—N/a	—N/a	—N/a	—N/a	—N/a
Quad singles	£48,000	£24,000	£16,500	£11,500	—N/a	—N/a	—N/a	—N/a	—N/a	—N/a	—N/a
Quad doubles *	£20,000	£10,000	—N/a	—N/a	—N/a	—N/a	—N/a	—N/a	—N/a	—N/a	—N/a

*per team

Preceded by 2021 French Open	Grand Slam Tournaments	Succeeded by 2021 US Open
Preceded by 2019 Wimbledon Championships (2020 edition cancelled)	The Championships, Wimbledon	Succeeded by 2022 Wimbledon Championships
