= 2024 San Luis Open Challenger – Women's doubles =

Women's doubles
- 2024 San Luis Open Challenger

Final
- Champions: (Hungary) Anna Bondár (Slovenia) Tamara Zidanšek
- Runners-up: (Brazil) Laura Pigossi (Poland) Katarzyna Piter
- Score: Walkover

Events
Singles	men	women
Doubles	men	women
← 2023 ·	San Luis Open Challenger	· 2025 →

Aliona Bolsova and Andrea Gámiz were the reigning champions, but Bolsova did not participate this year. Gámiz partnered Yuliana Lizarazo but lost in the quarterfinals to Anna Bondár and Tamara Zidanšek.

Bondár and Zidanšek won the title by walkover after Laura Pigossi and Katarzyna Piter withdrew from the final.

== Seeds ==
1. (United States) Angela Kulikov / (France) Elixane Lechemia (quarterfinals, retired)
2. (Germany) Julia Lohoff / (Switzerland) Conny Perrin (first round)
3. (Romania) Irina Bara / (Slovenia) Dalila Jakupović (first round)
4. (United States) Hailey Baptiste / (United States) Whitney Osuigwe (quarterfinals, withdrew)

== Draw ==
=== Key ===
- Q = Qualifier
- WC = Wild card
- LL = Lucky loser
- Alt = Alternate
- SE = Special exempt
- PR = Protected ranking
- ITF = ITF entry
- JE = Junior exempt
- w/o = Walkover
- r = Retired
- d = Defaulted
- SR = Special ranking

=== Draw ===
First round
1	(United States) A Kulikov (France) E Lechemia	6	4	[10]
(United States) J Aney (Colombia) M Herazo González	2	6	[4]
(United Kingdom) F Jones (Argentina) N Podoroska	6	7^{7}
(Colombia) MP Pérez García (United States) S Sewing	4	6^{5}
3	(Romania) I Bara (Slovenia) D Jakupović	5	2
(Hungary) A Bondár (Slovenia) T Zidanšek	7	6
(Italy) L Stefanini (Ukraine) K Zavatska	2	3
(Venezuela) A Gámiz (Colombia) Y Lizarazo	6	6
(Argentina) J Riera (Australia) A Sharma
(Canada) R Marino (Mexico) MF Navarro Oliva	w/o
(Mexico) J Hinojosa Gómez (United States) V Lepchenko	3	5
4	(United States) H Baptiste (United States) W Osuigwe	6	7
(United States) Q Gleason (Serbia) N Stevanović	6	6
(Mexico) V Rodríguez (Mexico) AS Sánchez	1	0
(Brazil) L Pigossi (Poland) K Piter	3	6	[13]
2	(Germany) J Lohoff (Switzerland) C Perrin	6	2	[11]

Quarterfinals
1	(United States) A Kulikov (France) E Lechemia	2^{r}
(United Kingdom) F Jones (Argentina) N Podoroska	1
(Hungary) A Bondár (Slovenia) T Zidanšek	6	6
(Venezuela) A Gámiz (Colombia) Y Lizarazo	2	4
(Canada) R Marino (Mexico) MF Navarro Oliva	w/o
4	(United States) H Baptiste (United States) W Osuigwe
(United States) Q Gleason (Serbia) N Stevanović	7	3	[3]
(Brazil) L Pigossi (Poland) K Piter	5	6	[10]

Semifinals
(United Kingdom) F Jones (Argentina) N Podoroska
(Hungary) A Bondár (Slovenia) T Zidanšek	w/o
(Canada) R Marino (Mexico) MF Navarro Oliva	2	6^{6}
(Brazil) L Pigossi (Poland) K Piter	6	7^{8}

Final
(Hungary) A Bondár (Slovenia) T Zidanšek	w/o
(Brazil) L Pigossi (Poland) K Piter
