= 2024 San Luis Open Challenger =

- Date: 25–31 March
- Edition: 36th (men); 2nd (women)
- Category: WTA 125 (women); ATP Challenger 75 (men)
- Draw: 32S/16D
- Prize money: $115,000 (women) $82,000 (men)
- Surface: Clay
- Location: San Luis Potosí, Mexico
- Venue: Club Deportivo Potosino

Champions

Men's singles
- (Colombia) Nicolás Mejía

Women's singles
- (Argentina) Nadia Podoroska

Men's doubles
- (India) Rithvik Choudary Bollipalli / (India) Niki Kaliyanda Poonacha

Women's doubles
- (Hungary) Anna Bondár / (Slovenia) Tamara Zidanšek
- San Luis Open Challenger Tour

The 2024 San Luis Tennis Open was a professional tennis tournament played on outdoor clay courts. It was the 36th edition of the tournament for the men which was part of the 2024 ATP Challenger Tour and 2nd edition for the women which was part of the 2024 WTA 125 tournaments. It took place at the Club Deportivo Potosino in San Luis Potosí, Mexico between 25 and 31 March 2024.

== Men's singles main-draw entrants ==
=== Seeds ===
Country	Player	Rank^{1}	Seed
ARG	Thiago Agustín Tirante	99	1
AUS	James Duckworth	109	2
CHI	Tomás Barrios Vera	111	3
MON	Valentin Vacherot	146	4
USA	Denis Kudla	163	5
FRA	Giovanni Mpetshi Perricard	165	6
AUS	Marc Polmans	167	7
GBR	Oliver Crawford	203	8

- ^{1} Rankings are as of 18 March 2024.

=== Other entrants ===
The following players received wildcards into the singles main draw:

- (Mexico) Ernesto Escobedo
- (Mexico) Rodrigo Pacheco Méndez
- (Canada) Vasek Pospisil

The following players received entry into the singles main draw as alternates:

- (South Korea) Gerard Campaña Lee
- (Zimbabwe) Benjamin Lock
- (Czech Republic) Dominik Palán

The following players received entry from the qualifying draw:

- (Ecuador) Andrés Andrade
- (Dominican Republic) Roberto Cid Subervi
- (United States) Christian Langmo
- (Colombia) Nicolás Mejía
- (Chile) Matías Soto
- (Kazakhstan) Beibit Zhukayev

== Women's singles main-draw entrants ==
=== Seeds ===
Country	Player	Rank^{1}	Seed
GER	Tatjana Maria	48	1
ITA	Elisabetta Cocciaretto	51	2
ESP	Sara Sorribes Tormo	52	3
ARG	Nadia Podoroska	78	4
	Erika Andreeva	94	5
USA	Hailey Baptiste	96	6
FRA	Alizé Cornet	99	7
ARG	María Lourdes Carlé	101	8

- ^{1} Rankings are as of 18 March 2024.

=== Other entrants ===
The following players received wildcards into the singles main draw:

- (Italy) Elisabetta Cocciaretto
- (Mexico) María Fernanda Navarro Oliva
- (Mexico) Ana Sofía Sánchez
- (Canada) Marina Stakusic

The following players received entry from the qualifying draw:

- (Italy) Nuria Brancaccio
- (Mexico) Jéssica Hinojosa Gómez
- (Romania) Anca Todoni
- (China) You Xiaodi

== Women's doubles main-draw entrants ==
=== Seeds ===
Country	Player	Country	Player	Rank^{1}	Seed
USA	Angela Kulikov	FRA	Elixane Lechemia	182	1
GER	Julia Lohoff	SUI	Conny Perrin	215	2
ROU	Irina Bara	SLO	Dalila Jakupović	240	3
USA	Hailey Baptiste	USA	Whitney Osuigwe	256	4

- Rankings are as of 18 March 2024

== Champions ==
=== Men's singles ===
- (Colombia) Nicolás Mejía def. (Chile) Matías Soto 6–1, 5–7, 6–2.

=== Women's singles ===
- (Argentina) Nadia Podoroska def. (United Kingdom) Francesca Jones 6–1, 6–2.

=== Men's doubles ===
- (India) Rithvik Choudary Bollipalli / (India) Niki Kaliyanda Poonacha def. (Switzerland) Antoine Bellier / (Switzerland) Marc-Andrea Hüsler 6–3, 6–2.

=== Women's doubles ===
- (Hungary) Anna Bondár / (Slovenia) Tamara Zidanšek def. (Brazil) Laura Pigossi / (Poland) Katarzyna Piter, Walkover
