= 2024 San Luis Open Challenger – Men's singles =

Men's singles
- 2024 San Luis Open Challenger

Final
- Champion: (Colombia) Nicolás Mejía
- Runner-up: (Chile) Matías Soto
- Score: 6–1, 5–7, 6–2

Events
| Singles | men | women |
| Doubles | men | women |
- San Luis Open Challenger

Tomás Barrios Vera was the defending champion but lost in the quarterfinals to Matías Soto.

Nicolás Mejía won the title after defeating Soto 6–1, 5–7, 6–2 in the final.

== Seeds ==
1. (Argentina) Thiago Agustín Tirante (quarterfinals)
2. (Australia) James Duckworth (second round)
3. (Chile) Tomás Barrios Vera (quarterfinals)
4. (Monaco) Valentin Vacherot (first round)
5. (United States) Denis Kudla (semifinals)
6. (France) Giovanni Mpetshi Perricard (semifinals)
7. (Australia) Marc Polmans (first round)
8. (United Kingdom) Oliver Crawford (second round)

== Draw ==
Key

- Q = Qualifier
- WC = Wild card
- LL = Lucky loser
- Alt = Alternate
- ITF = ITF entry
- PR = Protected ranking
- SR = Special ranking
- SE = Special exempt
- JE = Junior exempt
- JR = Junior Accelerator Programme entrant
- CO = College Accelerator Programme entrant
- NG = Next Gen Accelerator Program entrant
- w/o = Walkover
- r = Retired
- d = Defaulted

=== Finals ===
Semifinals
Q | (Colombia) Nicolás Mejía | 6 | 6
5 | (United States) Denis Kudla | 4 | 4
Q | (Chile) Matías Soto | 7^{11} | 6
6 | (France) Giovanni Mpetshi Perricard | 6^{9} | 3

Final
Q | (Colombia) Nicolás Mejía | 6 | 5 | 6
Q | (Chile) Matías Soto | 1 | 7 | 2

=== Top half ===
First round
1 | (Argentina) TA Tirante | 6 | 6
Alt | (South Korea) G Campaña Lee | 4 | 4
(Jamaica) B Bicknell | 6 | 4 | 3
(Italy) F Gaio | 3 | 6 | 6
WC | (Mexico) E Escobedo | 7^{7} | 5 | 1
Q | (Colombia) N Mejía | 6^{3} | 7 | 6
Alt | (Czech Republic) D Palán | 4 | 3
8 | (United Kingdom) O Crawford | 6 | 6
4 | (Monaco) V Vacherot | 2 | 6 | 3
(Australia) B Tomic | 6 | 3 | 6
(United States) M Krueger | 7^{7} | 3 | 6^{6}
(Switzerland) M-A Hüsler | 6^{3} | 6 | 7^{8}
(Australia) O Jasika | 4 | 2
WC | (Canada) V Pospisil | 6 | 6
(Argentina) JP Ficovich | 3 | 1
5 | (United States) D Kudla | 6 | 6

Second round
1 | (Argentina) TA Tirante | 7 | 6
(Italy) F Gaio | 5 | 1
Q | (Colombia) N Mejía | 6 | 6
8 | (United Kingdom) O Crawford | 3 | 0
(Australia) B Tomic | 6 | 1 | 6
(Switzerland) M-A Hüsler | 4 | 6 | 4
WC | (Canada) V Pospisil | 0 | 6^{3}
5 | (United States) D Kudla | 6 | 7^{7}

Quarterfinals
1 | (Argentina) TA Tirante | 3 | 4
Q | (Colombia) N Mejía | 6 | 6
(Australia) B Tomic | 4 | 0^{r}
5 | (United States) D Kudla | 6 | 3

Semifinals
Q | (Colombia) N Mejía | 6 | 6
5 | (United States) D Kudla | 4 | 4

=== Bottom half ===
First round
7 | (Australia) M Polmans | 3 | 4
(Bolivia) M Dellien | 6 | 6
Alt | (Zimbabwe) B Lock | 6 | 2 | 3
Q | (Chile) M Soto | 3 | 6 | 6
(United States) A Mayo | 5 | 6 | 6
Q | (United States) Christian Langmo | 7 | 4 | 3
(Australia) T Schoolkate | 5 | 4
3 | (Chile) T Barrios Vera | 7 | 6
6 | (France) G Mpetshi Perricard | 6^{4} | 7^{7} | 6
Q | (Ecuador) A Andrade | 7^{7} | 6^{4} | 3
WC | (Mexico) R Pacheco Méndez | 6 | 3 | 2
Q | (Dominican Republic) R Cid Subervi | 4 | 6 | 6
(Canada) A Galarneau | 6 | 4 | 6
(Switzerland) A Bellier | 4 | 6 | 3
Q | (Kazakhstan) B Zhukayev | 6^{4} | 6^{4}
2 | (Australia) J Duckworth | 7^{7} | 7^{7}

Second round
(Bolivia) M Dellien | 5 | 4
Q | (Chile) M Soto | 7 | 6
(United States) A Mayo | 5 | 6^{2}
3 | (Chile) T Barrios Vera | 7 | 7^{7}
6 | (France) G Mpetshi Perricard | 6 | 6
Q | (Dominican Republic) R Cid Subervi | 4 | 4
(Canada) A Galarneau | 7^{7} | 3 | 6
2 | (Australia) J Duckworth | 6^{1} | 6 | 1

Quarterfinals
Q | (Chile) M Soto | 6 | 6
3 | (Chile) T Barrios Vera | 3 | 4
6 | (France) G Mpetshi Perricard | 6 | 6^{4} | 7
(Canada) A Galarneau | 4 | 7^{7} | 5

Semifinals
Q | (Chile) M Soto | 7^{11} | 6
6 | (France) G Mpetshi Perricard | 6^{9} | 3
