= 2026 Palermo Ladies Open – Singles =

Singles
- 2026 Palermo Ladies Open

Final
- Champion: (United Kingdom) Francesca Jones
- Runner-up: (France) Fiona Ferro
- Score: 6–0, 4–6, 7–6^{(8–6)}

Details
- Draw: 32
- Seeds: 8

Events
Singles	Doubles
- Palermo Ladies Open

Defending champion Francesca Jones won the title, defeating Fiona Ferro 6–0, 4–6, 7–6^{(8–6)} in the final.

== Seeds ==
1. (United Kingdom) Francesca Jones (champion)
2. (Italy) Lucia Bronzetti (semifinals)
3. (Italy) Tyra Caterina Grant (withdrew)
4. (Slovenia) Tamara Zidanšek (first round)
5. (Serbia) Lola Radivojević (second round)
6. (Georgia (country)) Ekaterine Gorgodze (second round)
7. (France) Fiona Ferro (final)
8. (Bulgaria) Elizara Yaneva (first round)

== Draw ==
Key

- Q = Qualifier
- WC = Wild card
- LL = Lucky loser
- Alt = Alternate
- ITF = ITF entry
- PR = Protected ranking
- SR = Special ranking
- SE = Special exempt
- JE = Junior exempt
- JR = Junior Accelerator Programme entrant
- CO = College Accelerator Programme entrant
- NG = Next Gen Accelerator Program entrant
- w/o = Walkover
- r = Retired
- d = Defaulted

=== Finals ===
semifinals
1	(United Kingdom) Francesca Jones	6	6
Alevtina Ibragimova	3	4
7	(France) Fiona Ferro	6	6
2	(Italy) Lucia Bronzetti	2	3

final
1	(United Kingdom) Francesca Jones	6	4	7^{8}
7	(France) Fiona Ferro	0	6	6^{6}

=== Top half ===
First round
1	(United Kingdom) F Jones	6	6
D Astakhova	3	3
(Romania) M Bulgaru	3	6	6
(Sweden) C Hennemann	6	1	2
Q	(Hungary) A Tóth	6	3	4
(Italy) J Ruggeri	3	6	6
S Lansere	1	6	1
5	(Serbia) L Radivojević	6	3	6
4	(Slovenia) T Zidanšek	6	4	3
A Ibragimova	3	6	6
(France) A Ramé	6	6
A Tikhonova	1	2
WC	(Italy) A Abbagnato	2	1
(France) C Burel	6	6
(Italy) F Urgesi	5	7^{7}	6
8	(Bulgaria) E Yaneva	7	6^{2}	1

Second round
1	(United Kingdom) F Jones	6	6
(Romania) M Bulgaru	3	2
(Italy) J Ruggeri	7	4	6
5	(Serbia) L Radivojević	5	6	4
A Ibragimova	6	6
(France) A Ramé	0	4
(France) C Burel	w/o
(Italy) F Urgesi

Quarterfinals
1	(United Kingdom) F Jones	4	6	6
(Italy) J Ruggeri	6	3	2
A Ibragimova	3	7^{7}	6
(France) C Burel	6	6^{5}	4

Semifinals
1	(United Kingdom) F Jones	6	6
A Ibragimova	3	4

=== Bottom half ===
First round
7	(France) F Ferro	6	6
Q	(China) Y Ren	2	3
(North Macedonia) L Gjorcheska	2	0
E Andreeva	6	6
(Germany) C Werner	4	6	2
Q	(Germany) M Hodzic	6	4	6
Q	(Italy) N Basiletti	6	6
LL	(Cyprus) R Șerban	4	1
6	(Georgia (country)) E Gorgodze	7^{7}	3	7^{7}
(Spain) A Mintegi del Olmo	6^{3}	6	6^{2}
(Morocco) Y Kabbaj	6	6
WC	(Italy) D Chiesa	4	1
WC	(Italy) A Mazzola	6^{1}	3
(Italy) D Spiteri	7^{7}	6
WC	(Italy) I Pistola	1	4
2	(Italy) L Bronzetti	6	6

Second round
7	(France) F Ferro	6	6
E Andreeva	4	3
Q	(Germany) M Hodzic	6	2	6
Q	(Italy) N Basiletti	3	6	2
6	(Georgia (country)) E Gorgodze	5	2
(Morocco) Y Kabbaj	7	6
(Italy) D Spiteri	4	4
2	(Italy) L Bronzetti	6	6

Quarterfinals
7	(France) F Ferro	6	6
Q	(Germany) M Hodzic	2	0
(Morocco) Y Kabbaj	3	6	0
2	(Italy) L Bronzetti	6	2	6

Semifinals
7	(France) F Ferro	6	6
2	(Italy) L Bronzetti	2	3

== Qualifying ==
=== Seeds ===
1. (Italy) Federica Urgesi (moved into main draw)
2. (China) Ren Yufei (qualified)
3. (Italy) Noemi Basiletti (qualified)
4. (Cyprus) Raluca Șerban (qualifying competition, retired, lucky loser)
5. (Italy) Dalila Spiteri (moved into main draw)
6. (Germany) Mina Hodzic (qualified)
7. (Hungary) Amarissa Tóth (qualified)
8. (Bulgaria) Isabella Shinikova (qualifying competition)

=== Qualifiers ===
1. (Germany) Mina Hodzic
2. (China) Ren Yufei
3. (Italy) Noemi Basiletti
4. (Hungary) Amarissa Tóth

=== Lucky loser ===
1. (Cyprus) Raluca Șerban

=== Qualifying draw ===
==== First qualifier ====
First round
1	(Italy) Federica Urgesi
(Ukraine) Yelyzaveta Kotliar	w/o
(United Kingdom) Emily Webley-Smith	2	1
6	(Germany) Mina Hodzic	6	6

Qualifying competition
(Ukraine) Yelyzaveta Kotliar	6^{1}	6^{6}
6	(Germany) Mina Hodzic	7^{7}	7^{8}

==== Second qualifier ====
First round
2	(China) Ren Yufei	5	6	6
WC	(Italy) Carla Giambelli	7	4	3
(Italy) Miriana Tona	w/o
5	(Italy) Dalila Spiteri

Qualifying competition
2	(China) Ren Yufei	6	6
(Italy) Miriana Tona	0	3

==== Third qualifier ====
First round
3	(Italy) Noemi Basiletti	6	6
(Germany) Laura Bohner	2	2
(United States) Rasheeda McAdoo	4	4
8	(Bulgaria) Isabella Shinikova	6	6

Qualifying competition
3	(Italy) Noemi Basiletti	7	6
8	(Bulgaria) Isabella Shinikova	5	0

==== Fourth qualifier ====
First round
4	(Cyprus) Raluca Șerban	5	6	6
WC	(Italy) Anastasia Bertacchi	7	4	0
(Croatia) Lucija Ćirić Bagarić
7	(Hungary) Amarissa Tóth	w/o

Qualifying competition
4	(Cyprus) Raluca Șerban	1	0^{r}
7	(Hungary) Amarissa Tóth	6	1
