= 2021 Wimbledon Championships – Women's doubles =

Women's doubles
- 2021 Wimbledon Championships

Final
- Champions: (Chinese Taipei) Hsieh Su-wei (Belgium) Elise Mertens
- Runners-up: (Russia) Veronika Kudermetova (Russia) Elena Vesnina
- Score: 3–6, 7–5, 9–7

Events
Singles	men	women		boys	girls
Doubles	men	women	mixed	boys	girls
WC Singles	men	women	quad
WC Doubles	men	women	quad
← 2019 ·	Wimbledon Championships	· 2022 →

Defending champion Hsieh Su-wei and her partner, Elise Mertens, defeated Veronika Kudermetova and Elena Vesnina in the final, 3–6, 7–5, 9–7, to win the ladies' doubles tennis title at the 2021 Wimbledon Championships. The pair saved two championship points en route to their first major title together.

Hsieh won the title with Barbora Strýcová when the tournament was last held in 2019, but Strýcová retired from professional tennis in May 2021.

By reaching the final, Mertens reclaimed the world No. 1 doubles ranking. Kristina Mladenovic was also in contention for the ranking, but lost in the first round.

Bethanie Mattek-Sands and Samantha Stosur were each bidding to complete the career Grand Slam in doubles, but they lost in the second round and first round, respectively.

== Seeds ==
The top seed received a bye into the second round after their first round opponents withdrew from the tournament.

1. (Czech Republic) Barbora Krejčíková / (Czech Republic) Kateřina Siniaková (quarterfinals)
2. (Hungary) Tímea Babos / (France) Kristina Mladenovic (first round)
3. (Chinese Taipei) Hsieh Su-wei / (Belgium) Elise Mertens (champions)
4. (United States) Nicole Melichar / (Netherlands) Demi Schuurs (first round)
5. (Japan) Shuko Aoyama / (Japan) Ena Shibahara (semifinals)
6. (Chile) Alexa Guarachi / (United States) Desirae Krawczyk (first round)
7. (Chinese Taipei) Chan Hao-ching / (Chinese Taipei) Latisha Chan (quarterfinals)
8. (United States) Hayley Carter / (Brazil) Luisa Stefani (first round)

9. (Canada) Sharon Fichman / (Mexico) Giuliana Olmos (third round, withdrew)
10. (Croatia) Darija Jurak / (Slovenia) Andreja Klepač (first round)
11. (Germany) Laura Siegemund / (Russia) Vera Zvonareva (third round)
12. (United States) Coco Gauff / (United States) Caty McNally (third round)
13. (Ukraine) Nadiia Kichenok / (Romania) Raluca Olaru (third round)
14. (United States) Asia Muhammad / (United States) Jessica Pegula (third round)
15. (Slovakia) Viktória Kužmová / (Netherlands) Arantxa Rus (third round)
16. (Czech Republic) Marie Bouzková / (Czech Republic) Lucie Hradecká (quarterfinals)

Click on the seed number of a player to go to their draw section.

== Draw ==
=== Key ===
- Q = Qualifier
- WC = Wild card
- LL = Lucky loser
- Alt = Alternate
- ITF = ITF entry
- PR = Protected ranking
- SR = Special ranking
- SE = Special exempt
- JE = Junior exempt
- JR = Junior Accelerator Programme entrant
- CO = College Accelerator Programme entrant
- NG = Next Gen Accelerator Program entrant
- w/o = Walkover
- r = Retired
- d = Defaulted

=== Finals ===
Quarterfinals
1	(Czech Republic) Barbora Krejčíková (Czech Republic) Kateřina Siniaková	7^{8}	4	7
PR	(Russia) Veronika Kudermetova (Russia) Elena Vesnina	6^{6}	6	9
(United States) Caroline Dolehide (Australia) Storm Sanders	7	6
7	(Chinese Taipei) Chan Hao-ching (Chinese Taipei) Latisha Chan	5	2
(Serbia) Aleksandra Krunić (Serbia) Nina Stojanović	1	3
3	(Chinese Taipei) Hsieh Su-wei (Belgium) Elise Mertens	6	6
5	(Japan) Shuko Aoyama (Japan) Ena Shibahara	7^{7}	7
16	(Czech Republic) Marie Bouzková (Czech Republic) Lucie Hradecká	6^{3}	5

Semifinals
PR	(Russia) Veronika Kudermetova (Russia) Elena Vesnina	7^{8}	3	7
(United States) Caroline Dolehide (Australia) Storm Sanders	6^{6}	6	5
3	(Chinese Taipei) Hsieh Su-wei (Belgium) Elise Mertens	6	1	6
5	(Japan) Shuko Aoyama (Japan) Ena Shibahara	4	6	3

Final
PR	(Russia) Veronika Kudermetova (Russia) Elena Vesnina	6	5	7
3	(Chinese Taipei) Hsieh Su-wei (Belgium) Elise Mertens	3	7	9

=== Top half ===
==== Section 1 ====
First round
PR	(Australia) S Stosur (United States) C Vandeweghe	6^{3}	3
(Russia) A Kalinskaya (Kazakhstan) Y Putintseva	7^{7}	6
(Belgium) G Minnen (Belgium) A Van Uytvanck	6	6
Alt	(United States) E Bektas (United States) Q Gleason	4	4
WC	(United Kingdom) N Broady (United Kingdom) J Burrage	2	6^{3}
15	(Slovakia) V Kužmová (Netherlands) A Rus	6	7^{7}
12	(United States) C Gauff (United States) C McNally	6	6
(Russia) D Kasatkina (Australia) E Perez	3	2
(Spain) P Badosa (Spain) S Sorribes Tormo	6	7
(United States) B Pera (Netherlands) R van der Hoek	4	5
PR	(Russia) V Kudermetova (Russia) E Vesnina	6	6
(Russia) A Pavlyuchenkova (Kazakhstan) E Rybakina	4	2
PR	(United States) B Mattek-Sands (India) S Mirza	7	6
6	(Chile) A Guarachi (United States) D Krawczyk	5	3

Second round
1	(Czech Republic) B Krejčíková (Czech Republic) K Siniaková	w/o
(Russia) A Kalinskaya (Kazakhstan) Y Putintseva
(Belgium) G Minnen (Belgium) A Van Uytvanck	5	4
15	(Slovakia) V Kužmová (Netherlands) A Rus	7	6
12	(United States) C Gauff (United States) C McNally	6	6
(Spain) P Badosa (Spain) S Sorribes Tormo	4	4
PR	(Russia) V Kudermetova (Russia) E Vesnina	6	6
PR	(United States) B Mattek-Sands (India) S Mirza	4	3

Third round
1	(Czech Republic) B Krejčíková (Czech Republic) K Siniaková	7^{7}	6
15	(Slovakia) V Kužmová (Netherlands) A Rus	6^{3}	3
12	(United States) C Gauff (United States) C McNally	6^{0}	6	3
PR	(Russia) V Kudermetova (Russia) E Vesnina	7^{7}	4	6

Quarterfinals
1	(Czech Republic) B Krejčíková (Czech Republic) K Siniaková	7^{8}	4	7
PR	(Russia) V Kudermetova (Russia) E Vesnina	6^{6}	6	9

==== Section 2 ====
First round
4	(United States) N Melichar (Netherlands) D Schuurs	2	3
(Romania) A Mitu (Romania) M Niculescu	6	6
(United States) C Dolehide (Australia) S Sanders	7^{7}	6
(Slovenia) K Juvan (United States) A Li	6^{4}	2
(United States) S Santamaria (Slovenia) T Zidanšek	6	6
(Spain) L Arruabarrena (Argentina) N Podoroska	3	2
(Canada) L Fernandez (Russia) A Potapova	6	3	6
13	(Ukraine) N Kichenok (Romania) R Olaru	2	6	8
10	(Croatia) D Jurak (Slovenia) A Klepač	2	3
(Croatia) P Martić (United States) S Rogers	6	6
WC	(United Kingdom) H Dart (United Kingdom) H Watson	6	6
(Estonia) K Kanepi (China) S Zhang	3	2
(Netherlands) K Bertens (Netherlands) L Pattinama Kerkhove	1	6	4
Alt	(France) E Lechemia (United States) I Neel	6	3	6
(Sweden) C Lister (Romania) PM Țig	3	2
7	(Chinese Taipei) H-c Chan (Chinese Taipei) L Chan	6	6

Second round
(Romania) A Mitu (Romania) M Niculescu	2	3
(United States) C Dolehide (Australia) S Sanders	6	6
(United States) S Santamaria (Slovenia) T Zidanšek	6^{4}	6^{5}
13	(Ukraine) N Kichenok (Romania) R Olaru	7^{7}	7^{7}
(Croatia) P Martić (United States) S Rogers	6	6^{6}	1
WC	(United Kingdom) H Dart (United Kingdom) H Watson	3	7^{8}	6
Alt	(France) E Lechemia (United States) I Neel	4	1
7	(Chinese Taipei) H-c Chan (Chinese Taipei) L Chan	6	6

Third round
(United States) C Dolehide (Australia) S Sanders	7^{7}	6
13	(Ukraine) N Kichenok (Romania) R Olaru	6^{4}	2
WC	(United Kingdom) H Dart (United Kingdom) H Watson	6	2	2
7	(Chinese Taipei) H-c Chan (Chinese Taipei) L Chan	4	6	6

Quarterfinals
(United States) C Dolehide (Australia) S Sanders	7	6
7	(Chinese Taipei) H-c Chan (Chinese Taipei) L Chan	5	2

=== Bottom half ===
==== Section 3 ====
First round
8	(United States) H Carter (Brazil) L Stefani	6	4	5
(Serbia) A Krunić (Serbia) N Stojanović	3	6	7
PR	(Germany) M Barthel (Germany) J Wachaczyk	5	7^{7}	9
(Belarus) A Sasnovich (Denmark) C Tauson	7	6^{4}	7
(Ukraine) M Kostyuk (Latvia) J Ostapenko	6	6
(Switzerland) B Bencic (United States) S Kenin	3	4
(Germany) V Heisen (Czech Republic) K Peschke	2	1
9	(Canada) S Fichman (Mexico) G Olmos	6	6
14	(United States) A Muhammad (United States) J Pegula	6	6
(United States) L Davis (India) A Raina	3	2
(Ukraine) L Kichenok (Japan) M Ninomiya	6	3	9
(Poland) M Linette (Poland) A Rosolska	4	6	7
(Japan) M Doi (Switzerland) V Golubic	6	2	8
(Russia) E Alexandrova (China) Y Wang	2	6	6
PR	(Russia) V Diatchenko (Kazakhstan) G Voskoboeva	5	2
3	(Chinese Taipei) S-w Hsieh (Belgium) E Mertens	7	6

Second round
(Serbia) A Krunić (Serbia) N Stojanović	7	6
PR	(Germany) M Barthel (Germany) J Wachaczyk	5	3
(Ukraine) M Kostyuk (Latvia) J Ostapenko
9	(Canada) S Fichman (Mexico) G Olmos	w/o
14	(United States) A Muhammad (United States) J Pegula	6	6
(Ukraine) L Kichenok (Japan) M Ninomiya	4	4
(Japan) M Doi (Switzerland) V Golubic	1	7	0
3	(Chinese Taipei) S-w Hsieh (Belgium) E Mertens	6	5	6

Third round
(Serbia) A Krunić (Serbia) N Stojanović	w/o
9	(Canada) S Fichman (Mexico) G Olmos
14	(United States) A Muhammad (United States) J Pegula	5	3
3	(Chinese Taipei) S-w Hsieh (Belgium) E Mertens	7	6

Quarterfinals
(Serbia) A Krunić (Serbia) N Stojanović	1	3
3	(Chinese Taipei) S-w Hsieh (Belgium) E Mertens	6	6

==== Section 4 ====
First round
5	(Japan) S Aoyama (Japan) E Shibahara	6	6
(Canada) G Dabrowski (France) C Garcia	4	2
WC	(United Kingdom) SB Grey (United Kingdom) E Webley-Smith	6	6^{5}	4
(Czech Republic) T Martincová (Czech Republic) M Vondroušová	3	7^{7}	6
(United States) C McHale (Australia) A Tomljanović	3	7^{7}	3
(United States) K Christian (Japan) N Hibino	6	6^{4}	6
WC	(United Kingdom) T Moore (United Kingdom) E Silva	4	3
11	(Germany) L Siegemund (Russia) V Zvonareva	6	6
16	(Czech Republic) M Bouzková (Czech Republic) L Hradecká	7^{7}	6
(Japan) M Kato (Czech Republic) R Voráčová	6^{4}	2
(United States) M Brengle (China) L Zhu	3	6	1
(Russia) A Blinkova (Germany) A-L Friedsam	6	3	6
(Russia) V Gracheva (Georgia (country)) O Kalashnikova	6	6
WC	(United Kingdom) N Bains (United Kingdom) S Murray Sharan	3	4
(Kazakhstan) Z Diyas (Australia) Ar Rodionova	6	6
2	(Hungary) T Babos (France) K Mladenovic	1	2

Second round
5	(Japan) S Aoyama (Japan) E Shibahara	6	6
(Czech Republic) T Martincová (Czech Republic) M Vondroušová	1	2
(United States) K Christian (Japan) N Hibino	2	2
11	(Germany) L Siegemund (Russia) V Zvonareva	6	6
16	(Czech Republic) M Bouzková (Czech Republic) L Hradecká	6	6
(Russia) A Blinkova (Germany) A-L Friedsam	3	3
(Russia) V Gracheva (Georgia (country)) O Kalashnikova	6	6
(Kazakhstan) Z Diyas (Australia) Ar Rodionova	3	1

Third round
5	(Japan) S Aoyama (Japan) E Shibahara	6	7
11	(Germany) L Siegemund (Russia) V Zvonareva	2	5
16	(Czech Republic) M Bouzková (Czech Republic) L Hradecká	6	6
(Russia) V Gracheva (Georgia (country)) O Kalashnikova	1	3

Quarterfinals
5	(Japan) S Aoyama (Japan) E Shibahara	7^{7}	7
16	(Czech Republic) M Bouzková (Czech Republic) L Hradecká	6^{3}	5

== Other entry information ==
=== Wild cards ===
- (United Kingdom) Naiktha Bains / (United Kingdom) Samantha Murray Sharan
- (United Kingdom) Naomi Broady / (United Kingdom) Jodie Burrage
- (United Kingdom) Harriet Dart / (United Kingdom) Heather Watson
- (United Kingdom) Sarah Beth Grey / (United Kingdom) Emily Webley-Smith
- (United Kingdom) Tara Moore / (United Kingdom) Eden Silva

=== Protected ranking ===
- (Germany) Mona Barthel / (Germany) Julia Wachaczyk
- (Russia) Vitalia Diatchenko / (Kazakhstan) Galina Voskoboeva
- (Russia) Veronika Kudermetova / (Russia) Elena Vesnina
- (United States) Bethanie Mattek-Sands / (India) Sania Mirza
- (Australia) Samantha Stosur / (United States) CoCo Vandeweghe

=== Withdrawals ===
Before the tournament

- (United States) Amanda Anisimova / (United States) Sloane Stephens → replaced by (United States) Emina Bektas / (United States) Quinn Gleason
- (France) Alizé Cornet / (France) Fiona Ferro → replaced by a bye
- (Montenegro) Danka Kovinić / (Sweden) Rebecca Peterson → replaced by (France) Elixane Lechemia / (United States) Ingrid Neel

During the tournament

- (Canada) Sharon Fichman / (Mexico) Giuliana Olmos
- (Russia) Anna Kalinskaya / (Kazakhstan) Yulia Putintseva
- (Ukraine) Marta Kostyuk / (Latvia) Jeļena Ostapenko

== See also ==
- 2021 Wimbledon Championships – Day-by-day summaries
