= 2021 Wimbledon Championships – Women's singles =

Tennis tournament

Ladies' singles
- 2021 Wimbledon Championships

Final
- Champion: (Australia) Ashleigh Barty
- Runner-up: (Czech Republic) Karolína Plíšková
- Score: 6–3, 6–7^{(4–7)}, 6–3

Details
- Draw: 128 (16 Q / 7 WC)
- Seeds: 32

Events
Singles	men	women		boys	girls
Doubles	men	women	mixed	boys	girls
WC Singles	men	women	quad	boys	girls
WC Doubles	men	women	quad	boys	girls
- Wimbledon Championships

Ashleigh Barty defeated Karolína Plíšková in the final, 6–3, 6–7^{(4–7)}, 6–3 to win the ladies' singles tennis title at the 2021 Wimbledon Championships. It was her first Wimbledon title and second major singles title overall. Barty was the first Australian to win the title since Evonne Goolagong Cawley in 1980, and the fifth player (following Karen Susman, Ann Jones, Martina Hingis and Amélie Mauresmo) to win the women's singles title after previously winning the girls' singles title. She retained the world No. 1 singles ranking by reaching the semifinals, with Aryna Sabalenka also in contention for the top ranking.

Simona Halep was the reigning champion from when the tournament was last held in 2019, but withdrew before the tournament due to a calf injury.

Serena Williams retired from her first-round match against Aliaksandra Sasnovich due to injury. This marked the first time since 2014 that the Wimbledon final did not feature one of the Williams sisters (as Venus Williams lost to Ons Jabeur in the second round), as well as the first time since 1997 that neither sister progressed beyond the second round.

This was the first edition of Wimbledon since 2009 that saw the top two seeds progress to the semifinals. Additionally, this was the first major in the Open Era where two wildcards, Liudmila Samsonova and Emma Raducanu (making her first major appearance), reached the fourth round. Raducanu was the youngest British woman to reach the fourth round at Wimbledon in the Open Era. Jabeur was the first Tunisian and the first Arab woman to reach the Wimbledon quarterfinals.

This tournament marked the first Wimbledon appearances of 2024 champion Barbora Krejčíková, and 2022 champion, future world No. 1 and three-time major champion Elena Rybakina. Both players lost in the fourth round, to Barty and Sabalenka respectively.

== Seeds ==
1. (Australia) Ashleigh Barty (champion)
2. (Belarus) Aryna Sabalenka (semifinals)
3. (Ukraine) Elina Svitolina (second round)
4. (United States) Sofia Kenin (second round)
5. (Canada) Bianca Andreescu (first round)
6. (United States) Serena Williams (first round, retired)
7. (Poland) Iga Świątek (fourth round)
8. (Czech Republic) Karolína Plíšková (final)
9. (Switzerland) Belinda Bencic (first round)
10. (Czech Republic) Petra Kvitová (first round)
11. (Spain) Garbiñe Muguruza (third round)
12. (Belarus) Victoria Azarenka (second round)
13. (Belgium) Elise Mertens (third round)
14. (Czech Republic) Barbora Krejčíková (fourth round)
15. (Greece) Maria Sakkari (second round)
16. (Russia) Anastasia Pavlyuchenkova (third round)

17. (Netherlands) Kiki Bertens (first round)
18. (Kazakhstan) Elena Rybakina (fourth round)
19. (Czech Republic) Karolína Muchová (quarterfinals)
20. (United States) Coco Gauff (fourth round)
21. (Tunisia) Ons Jabeur (quarterfinals)
22. (United States) Jessica Pegula (second round)
23. (United States) Madison Keys (fourth round)
24. (Estonia) Anett Kontaveit (first round)
25. (Germany) Angelique Kerber (semifinals)
26. (Croatia) Petra Martić (second round)
27. (United Kingdom) Johanna Konta (withdrew due to close contact with positive COVID-19 test)
28. (United States) Alison Riske (first round)
29. (Russia) Veronika Kudermetova (first round)
30. (Spain) Paula Badosa (fourth round)
31. (Russia) Daria Kasatkina (second round)
32. (Russia) Ekaterina Alexandrova (second round)

Click on the seed number of a player to go to their draw section.

== Draw ==
Key

- Q = Qualifier
- WC = Wild card
- LL = Lucky loser
- Alt = Alternate
- ITF = ITF entry
- PR = Protected ranking
- SR = Special ranking
- SE = Special exempt
- JE = Junior exempt
- JR = Junior Accelerator Programme entrant
- CO = College Accelerator Programme entrant
- NG = Next Gen Accelerator Program entrant
- w/o = Walkover
- r = Retired
- d = Defaulted

=== Finals ===
Quarterfinals
1	(Australia) Ashleigh Barty	6	6
(Australia) Ajla Tomljanović	1	3
19	(Czech Republic) Karolína Muchová	2	3
25	(Germany) Angelique Kerber	6	6
8	(Czech Republic) Karolína Plíšková	6	6
(Switzerland) Viktorija Golubic	2	2
21	(Tunisia) Ons Jabeur	4	3
2	(Belarus) Aryna Sabalenka	6	6

Semifinals
1	(Australia) Ashleigh Barty	6	7^{7}
25	(Germany) Angelique Kerber	3	6^{3}
8	(Czech Republic) Karolína Plíšková	5	6	6
2	(Belarus) Aryna Sabalenka	7	4	4

Final
1	(Australia) Ashleigh Barty	6	6^{4}	6
8	(Czech Republic) Karolína Plíšková	3	7^{7}	3

=== Top half ===
==== Section 1 ====
First round
1	(Australia) A Barty	6	6^{1}	6
PR	(Spain) C Suárez Navarro	1	7^{7}	1
(Russia) A Blinkova	6	6
(Hungary) T Babos	2	2
Q	(Belarus) O Govortsova	4	2
PR	(United States) C Vandeweghe	6	6
(Czech Republic) K Siniaková	6	6
LL	(China) Y Wang	1	0
17	(Netherlands) K Bertens	3	4
(Ukraine) M Kostyuk	6	6
(Latvia) A Sevastova	6	6
(Kazakhstan) Z Diyas	4	1
PR	(Germany) A Petkovic	6	6
(Italy) J Paolini	4	3
(Denmark) C Tauson	3	2
14	(Czech Republic) B Krejčíková	6	6

Second round
1	(Australia) A Barty	6	6
(Russia) A Blinkova	4	3
PR	(United States) C Vandeweghe	6	2	2
(Czech Republic) K Siniaková	4	6	6
(Ukraine) M Kostyuk	6	4	3
(Latvia) A Sevastova	1	6	6
PR	(Germany) A Petkovic	5	4
14	(Czech Republic) B Krejčíková	7	6

Third round
1	(Australia) A Barty	6	7
(Czech Republic) K Siniaková	3	5
(Latvia) A Sevastova	6^{1}	6	5
14	(Czech Republic) B Krejčíková	7^{7}	3	7

Fourth round
1	(Australia) A Barty	7	6
14	(Czech Republic) B Krejčíková	5	3

==== Section 2 ====
First round
12	(Belarus) V Azarenka	6	6
PR	(Ukraine) K Kozlova	1	3
(Romania) S Cîrstea	6	6
WC	(United Kingdom) S Murray Sharan	3	3
WC	(United Kingdom) E Raducanu	7^{7}	6
Q	(Russia) V Diatchenko	6^{4}	0
(Czech Republic) M Vondroušová	2	6	6
24	(Estonia) A Kontaveit	6	4	2
31	(Russia) D Kasatkina	6	3	6
(Romania) PM Țig	0	6	3
(Canada) L Fernandez	1	2
(Latvia) J Ostapenko	6	6
Q	(Belgium) G Minnen	2	6^{5}
(Australia) A Tomljanović	6	7^{7}
(France) A Cornet	6	6
5	(Canada) B Andreescu	2	1

Second round
12	(Belarus) V Azarenka	6^{5}	6	4
(Romania) S Cîrstea	7^{7}	3	6
WC	(United Kingdom) E Raducanu	6	6
(Czech Republic) M Vondroušová	2	4
31	(Russia) D Kasatkina	1	6	6
(Latvia) J Ostapenko	6	3	8
(Australia) A Tomljanović	6	0	6
(France) A Cornet	4	6	3

Third round
(Romania) S Cîrstea	3	5
WC	(United Kingdom) E Raducanu	6	7
(Latvia) J Ostapenko	6	4	2
(Australia) A Tomljanović	4	6	6

Fourth round
WC	(United Kingdom) E Raducanu	4	0^{r}
(Australia) A Tomljanović	6	3

==== Section 3 ====
First round
3	(Ukraine) E Svitolina	6	2	6
(Belgium) A Van Uytvanck	3	6	3
(Poland) M Linette	2	6	6
(United States) A Anisimova	6	3	1
LL	(Bulgaria) T Pironkova	3	1
(Kazakhstan) Y Putintseva	6	6
(Spain) A Bolsova	2	7	2
30	(Spain) P Badosa	6	5	6
19	(Czech Republic) K Muchová	6	6
(China) S Zhang	3	3
(Switzerland) J Teichmann	2	2
(Italy) C Giorgi	6	6
(Czech Republic) Kr Plíšková	3	6	6
LL	(Australia) A Sharma	6	4	4
(Romania) A Bogdan	2	2
16	(Russia) A Pavlyuchenkova	6	6

Second round
3	(Ukraine) E Svitolina	3	4
(Poland) M Linette	6	6
(Kazakhstan) Y Putintseva	4	1
30	(Spain) P Badosa	6	6
19	(Czech Republic) K Muchová	6	5	6
(Italy) C Giorgi	3	7	3
(Czech Republic) Kr Plíšková	3	3
16	(Russia) A Pavlyuchenkova	6	6

Third round
(Poland) M Linette	7	2	4
30	(Spain) P Badosa	5	6	6
19	(Czech Republic) K Muchová	7	6
16	(Russia) A Pavlyuchenkova	5	3

Fourth round
30	(Spain) P Badosa	6^{6}	4
19	(Czech Republic) K Muchová	7^{8}	6

==== Section 4 ====
First round
9	(Switzerland) B Bencic	3	3
(Slovenia) K Juvan	6	6
Q	(Australia) E Perez	2	2
Q	(France) C Burel	6	6
PR	(Russia) E Vesnina	7	6
(Italy) M Trevisan	5	1
WC	(United Kingdom) F Jones	5	4
20	(United States) C Gauff	7	6
25	(Germany) A Kerber	6	6
(Serbia) N Stojanović	4	3
(Spain) S Sorribes Tormo	6	3	6
Q	(Croatia) A Konjuh	3	6	3
(Japan) N Hibino	6	5	6
(United States) B Pera	1	7	3
(Belarus) A Sasnovich	3
6	(United States) S Williams	3^{r}

Second round
(Slovenia) K Juvan	6	6
Q	(France) C Burel	3	4
PR	(Russia) E Vesnina	4	3
20	(United States) C Gauff	6	6
25	(Germany) A Kerber	7	5	6
(Spain) S Sorribes Tormo	5	7	4
(Japan) N Hibino	4	6^{4}
(Belarus) A Sasnovich	6	7^{7}

Third round
(Slovenia) K Juvan	3	3
20	(United States) C Gauff	6	6
25	(Germany) A Kerber	2	6	6
(Belarus) A Sasnovich	6	0	1

Fourth round
20	(United States) C Gauff	4	4
25	(Germany) A Kerber	6	6

=== Bottom half ===
==== Section 5 ====
First round
8	(Czech Republic) Ka Plíšková	7	6
(Slovenia) T Zidanšek	5	4
(Croatia) D Vekić	6	6
(Russia) A Potapova	1	4
(United States) A Li	4	6^{1}
(Argentina) N Podoroska	6	7^{7}
(Czech Republic) T Martincová	6	4	6
28	(United States) A Riske	2	6	1
22	(United States) J Pegula	6	6
(France) C Garcia	3	1
WC	(Russia) L Samsonova	6	6
(Estonia) K Kanepi	4	2
LL	(United States) K Ahn	2	7^{7}	8
(United Kingdom) H Watson	6	6^{3}	6
(United States) S Stephens	6	6
10	(Czech Republic) P Kvitová	3	4

Second round
8	(Czech Republic) Ka Plíšková	6	6
(Croatia) D Vekić	2	2
(Argentina) N Podoroska	3	6^{5}
(Czech Republic) T Martincová	6	7^{7}
22	(United States) J Pegula	4	6	3
WC	(Russia) L Samsonova	6	3	6
LL	(United States) K Ahn	5	3
(United States) S Stephens	7	6

Third round
8	(Czech Republic) Ka Plíšková	6	6
(Czech Republic) T Martincová	3	3
WC	(Russia) L Samsonova	6	2	6
(United States) S Stephens	2	6	4

Fourth round
8	(Czech Republic) Ka Plíšková	6	6
WC	(Russia) L Samsonova	2	3

==== Section 6 ====
First round
13	(Belgium) E Mertens	6	6
WC	(United Kingdom) H Dart	1	3
(China) L Zhu	6^{2}	6	6
PR	(Germany) M Barthel	7^{7}	3	3
WC	(United Kingdom) J Burrage	2	1
(United States) L Davis	6	6
Q	(United Kingdom) K Swan	3	4
23	(United States) M Keys	6	6
29	(Russia) V Kudermetova	6	1	9
(Switzerland) V Golubic	3	6	11
(Slovenia) P Hercog	6	3	2
(United States) D Collins	4	6	6
(United States) M Brengle	3	7	10
(United States) C McHale	6	5	8
Q	(China) Xin Wang	4	2
4	(United States) S Kenin	6	6

Second round
13	(Belgium) E Mertens	6	6
(China) L Zhu	2	0
(United States) L Davis	1	4
23	(United States) M Keys	6	6
(Switzerland) V Golubic	6	6
(United States) D Collins	2	0
(United States) M Brengle	6	6
4	(United States) S Kenin	2	4

Third round
13	(Belgium) E Mertens	5	3
23	(United States) M Keys	7	6
(Switzerland) V Golubic	6	6
(United States) M Brengle	2	1

Fourth round
23	(United States) M Keys	6^{3}	3
(Switzerland) V Golubic	7^{7}	6

==== Section 7 ====
First round
7	(Poland) I Świątek	6	6
(Chinese Taipei) S-w Hsieh	4	4
(Czech Republic) M Bouzková	5	4
(Russia) V Zvonareva	7	6
(Romania) I-C Begu	6	7
Q	(United States) K Volynets	4	5
(Russia) V Gracheva	7^{7}	4	3
26	(Croatia) P Martić	6^{3}	6	6
21	(Tunisia) O Jabeur	6	6
(Sweden) R Peterson	2	1
PR	(Romania) M Buzǎrnescu	5	6	3
(United States) V Williams	7	4	6
(Russia) S Kuznetsova	3	3
Q	(Netherlands) L Pattinama Kerkhove	6	6
(France) F Ferro	0	1
11	(Spain) G Muguruza	6	6

Second round
7	(Poland) I Świątek	6	6
(Russia) V Zvonareva	1	3
(Romania) I-C Begu	7	6^{7}	6
26	(Croatia) P Martić	5	7^{9}	3
21	(Tunisia) O Jabeur	7	6
(United States) V Williams	5	0
Q	(Netherlands) L Pattinama Kerkhove	1	4
11	(Spain) G Muguruza	6	6

Third round
7	(Poland) I Świątek	6	6
(Romania) I-C Begu	1	0
21	(Tunisia) O Jabeur	5	6	6
11	(Spain) G Muguruza	7	3	2

Fourth round
7	(Poland) I Świątek	7	1	1
21	(Tunisia) O Jabeur	5	6	6

==== Section 8 ====
First round
15	(Greece) M Sakkari	6	6
(Netherlands) A Rus	1	1
(United States) S Rogers	6	5	6
PR	(Australia) S Stosur	1	7	3
(Japan) M Doi	6	3	7
Q	(United States) C Liu	2	6	9
(France) K Mladenovic	4	0
18	(Kazakhstan) E Rybakina	6	6
32	(Russia) E Alexandrova	6	6
(Germany) L Siegemund	1	3
Q	(Colombia) C Osorio	1	6	6
Q	(Russia) A Kalinskaya	6	0	4
Q	(United States) D Lao	7^{8}	3	4
WC	(United Kingdom) K Boulter	6^{6}	6	6
Q	(Romania) M Niculescu	1	4
2	(Belarus) A Sabalenka	6	6

Second round
15	(Greece) M Sakkari	5	4
(United States) S Rogers	7	6
Q	(United States) C Liu	4	4
18	(Kazakhstan) E Rybakina	6	6
32	(Russia) E Alexandrova	5	2
Q	(Colombia) C Osorio	7	6
WC	(United Kingdom) K Boulter	6	3	3
2	(Belarus) A Sabalenka	4	6	6

Third round
(United States) S Rogers	1	4
18	(Kazakhstan) E Rybakina	6	6
Q	(Colombia) C Osorio	0	3
2	(Belarus) A Sabalenka	6	6

Fourth round
18	(Kazakhstan) E Rybakina	3	6	3
2	(Belarus) A Sabalenka	6	4	6

== Championship match statistics ==
Category	(Australia) Barty	(Czech Republic) Ka. Plíšková
1st serve %	54/89 (61%)	54/77 (70%)
1st serve points won	36 of 54 = 67%	36 of 54 = 67%
2nd serve points won	19 of 35 = 54%	8 of 23 = 35%
Total service points won	55 of 89 = 61.79%	44 of 77 = 57.14%
Aces	7	6
Double faults	7	5
Winners	30	27
Unforced errors	29	32
Net points won	8 of 15 = 53%	13 of 21 = 62%
Break points converted	6 of 8 = 75%	4 of 5 = 80%
Return points won	33 of 77 = 42%	34 of 89 = 38%
Total points won	88	78

== Seeded players ==
The following are the seeded players. Seedings are based on WTA rankings as of 21 June 2021. Rankings and points are as of 28 June 2021.

Seed	Rank	Player	Points before	Points defending	Points won	Points after	Status
1	1	(Australia) Ashleigh Barty	7,875	240	2,000	9,635	Champion, defeated (Czech Republic) Karolína Plíšková [8]
2	4	(Belarus) Aryna Sabalenka	6,195	10	780	6,965	Semifinals lost to (Czech Republic) Karolína Plíšková [8]
3	5	(Ukraine) Elina Svitolina	5,835	780	70	5,135	Second round lost to (Poland) Magda Linette
4	6	(United States) Sofia Kenin	5,640	70	70	5,640	Second round lost to (United States) Madison Brengle
5	7	(Canada) Bianca Andreescu	5,321	0	10	5,331	First round lost to (France) Alizé Cornet
6	8	(United States) Serena Williams	4,931	1,300	10	3,641	First round retired against (Belarus) Aliaksandra Sasnovich
7	9	(Poland) Iga Świątek	4,465	10	240	4,695	Fourth round lost to (Tunisia) Ons Jabeur [21]
8	13	(Czech Republic) Karolína Plíšková	3,915	240	1,300	4,975	Runner-up, lost to (Australia) Ashleigh Barty [1]
9	11	(Switzerland) Belinda Bencic	4,205	130	10	4,085	First round lost to (Slovenia) Kaja Juvan
10	10	(Czech Republic) Petra Kvitová	4,215	240	10	3,985	First round lost to (United States) Sloane Stephens
11	12	(Spain) Garbiñe Muguruza	4,045	10	130	4,165	Third round lost to (Tunisia) Ons Jabeur [21]
12	14	(Belarus) Victoria Azarenka	3,905	130	70	3,845	Second round lost to (Romania) Sorana Cîrstea
13	16	(Belgium) Elise Mertens	3,685	240	130	3,575	Third round lost to (United States) Madison Keys [23]
14	17	(Czech Republic) Barbora Krejčíková	3,683	(30)^{†}	240	3,893	Fourth round lost to (Australia) Ashleigh Barty [1]
15	18	(Greece) Maria Sakkari	3,480	130	70	3,420	Second round lost to (United States) Shelby Rogers
16	19	(Russia) Anastasia Pavlyuchenkova	3,300	10	130	3,420	Third round lost to (Czech Republic) Karolína Muchová [19]
17	21	(Netherlands) Kiki Bertens	3,095	130	10	2,975	First round lost to (Ukraine) Marta Kostyuk
18	20	(Kazakhstan) Elena Rybakina	3,123	(100)^{†}	240	3,263	Fourth round lost to (Belarus) Aryna Sabalenka [2]
19	22	(Czech Republic) Karolína Muchová	2,876	430	430	2,876	Quarterfinals lost to (Germany) Angelique Kerber [25]
20	23	(United States) Coco Gauff	2,805	280	240	2,765	Fourth round lost to (Germany) Angelique Kerber [25]
21	24	(Tunisia) Ons Jabeur	2,510	10	430	2,930	Quarterfinals lost to (Belarus) Aryna Sabalenka [2]
22	26	(United States) Jessica Pegula	2,410	10	70	2,460	Second round lost to (Russia) Liudmila Samsonova [WC]
23	27	(United States) Madison Keys	2,405	70	240	2,575	Fourth round lost to (Switzerland) Viktorija Golubic
24	25	(Estonia) Anett Kontaveit	2,505	130	10	2,385	First round lost to (Czech Republic) Markéta Vondroušová
25	28	(Germany) Angelique Kerber	2,240	70	780	2,950	Semifinals lost to (Australia) Ashleigh Barty [1]
26	30	(Croatia) Petra Martić	2,230	240	70	2,060	Second round lost to (Romania) Irina-Camelia Begu
~~27~~	~~31~~	~~(United Kingdom) Johanna Konta~~	2,157	430	0	1,727	Withdrew due to close contact with COVID-19 positive test
28	29	(United States) Alison Riske	2,235	430	10	1,815	First round lost to (Czech Republic) Tereza Martincová
29	32	(Russia) Veronika Kudermetova	2,100	70	10	2,040	First round lost to (Switzerland) Viktorija Golubic
30	33	(Spain) Paula Badosa	2,060	40	240	2,260	Fourth round lost to (Czech Republic) Karolína Muchová [19]
31	35	(Russia) Daria Kasatkina	2,030	10	70	2,090	Second round lost to (Latvia) Jeļena Ostapenko
32	36	(Russia) Ekaterina Alexandrova	1,940	10	70	2,000	Second round lost to (Colombia) Camila Osorio [Q]

†The player did not qualify for the tournament in 2019. Accordingly, points for her 16th best result are deducted instead.

=== Withdrawn players ===
The following players would have been seeded, but withdrew before the tournament began.

Rank	Player	Points before	Points defending	Points after	Withdrawal reason
2	(Japan) Naomi Osaka	7,346	10	7,336	Personal reasons
3	(Romania) Simona Halep	6,330	2,000	4,330	Calf injury
15	(United States) Jennifer Brady	3,840	10	3,830	Foot injury

== Other entry information ==
=== Wild card entries ===
The following players were awarded wild cards into the main draw.

- (United Kingdom) Katie Boulter
- (United Kingdom) Jodie Burrage
- (United Kingdom) Harriet Dart
- (United Kingdom) Francesca Jones
- (United Kingdom) Samantha Murray Sharan
- (United Kingdom) Emma Raducanu
- (Russia) Liudmila Samsonova

=== Qualifiers ===
- (France) Clara Burel
- (Russia) Vitalia Diatchenko
- (Belarus) Olga Govortsova
- (Russia) Anna Kalinskaya
- (Croatia) Ana Konjuh
- (United States) Danielle Lao
- (United States) Claire Liu
- (Belgium) Greet Minnen
- (Romania) Monica Niculescu
- (Colombia) Camila Osorio
- (Netherlands) Lesley Pattinama Kerkhove
- (Australia) Ellen Perez
- (United Kingdom) Katie Swan
- ~~(Ukraine) Lesia Tsurenko~~
- (United States) Katie Volynets
- (China) Wang Xinyu

=== Lucky losers ===
- (United States) Kristie Ahn
- (Bulgaria) Tsvetana Pironkova
- (Australia) Astra Sharma
- (China) Wang Yafan

=== Protected ranking ===
- (Russia) Elena Vesnina (52)
- (Spain) Carla Suárez Navarro (68)
- (Germany) Andrea Petkovic (80)
- (Australia) Samantha Stosur (97)
- (United States) CoCo Vandeweghe (100)
- (Germany) Mona Barthel (101)
- (Romania) Mihaela Buzărnescu (104)
- (Ukraine) Kateryna Kozlova (104)

=== Withdrawals ===
- † (Czech Republic) Barbora Strýcová (56) → replaced by (United States) CoCo Vandeweghe (100 PR)
- ‡ (Russia) Margarita Gasparyan (99) → replaced by (Romania) Ana Bogdan (101)
- ‡ (China) Wang Qiang (48) → replaced by (Germany) Mona Barthel (101 PR)
- ‡ (Japan) Naomi Osaka (2) → replaced by (Belarus) Aliaksandra Sasnovich (103)
- ‡ (China) Zheng Saisai (57) → replaced by (Spain) Aliona Bolsova (104)
- ‡ (Belgium) Kirsten Flipkens (92) → replaced by (Ukraine) Kateryna Kozlova (104 PR)
- ‡ (Ukraine) Dayana Yastremska (33) → replaced by (Romania) Mihaela Buzărnescu (104 PR)
- ‡ (United States) Jennifer Brady (14) → replaced by (Hungary) Tímea Babos (107)
- @ (Romania) Simona Halep (3) → replaced by (United States) Kristie Ahn (LL)
- § (United Kingdom) Johanna Konta (20) → replaced by (China) Wang Yafan (LL)
- § (Montenegro) Danka Kovinić (61) → replaced by (Australia) Astra Sharma (LL)
- § (Ukraine) Lesia Tsurenko (Q) → replaced by (Bulgaria) Tsvetana Pironkova (LL)

† – not included on entry list
‡ – withdrew from entry list before qualifying began
@ – withdrew from entry list after qualifying began
§ – withdrew from main draw

== See also ==
- 2021 Wimbledon Championships – Day-by-day summaries

Preceded by 2021 French Open – Women's singles	Grand Slam women's singles	Succeeded by 2021 US Open – Women's singles
