= 2024 San Luis Open Challenger – Women's singles =

Women's singles
- 2024 San Luis Open Challenger

Final
- Champion: (Argentina) Nadia Podoroska
- Runner-up: (United Kingdom) Francesca Jones
- Score: 6–1, 6–2

Events
Singles	men	women
Doubles	men	women
← 2023 ·	San Luis Open Challenger	· 2025 →

Elisabetta Cocciaretto was the defending champion, but lost in the semifinals to Nadia Podoroska.

Podoroska won the title after defeating Francesca Jones 6–1, 6–2 in the final.

== Seeds ==
1. (Germany) Tatjana Maria (first round)
2. (Italy) Elisabetta Cocciaretto (semifinals)
3. (Spain) Sara Sorribes Tormo (first round)
4. (Argentina) Nadia Podoroska (champion)
5. Erika Andreeva (second round, retired)
6. (United States) Hailey Baptiste (second round)
7. (France) Alizé Cornet (first round, retired)
8. (Argentina) María Lourdes Carlé (first round)

== Draw ==
=== Key ===
- Q = Qualifier
- WC = Wild card
- LL = Lucky loser
- Alt = Alternate
- SE = Special exempt
- PR = Protected ranking
- ITF = ITF entry
- JE = Junior exempt
- w/o = Walkover
- r = Retired
- d = Defaulted
- SR = Special ranking

=== Finals ===
Semifinals
(United Kingdom) Francesca Jones	6	6
(Argentina) Julia Riera	4	3
4	(Argentina) Nadia Podoroska	6^{5}	7^{7}	6
2/WC	(Italy) Elisabetta Cocciaretto	7^{7}	6^{5}	2

Final
(United Kingdom) Francesca Jones	1	2
4	(Argentina) Nadia Podoroska	6	6

=== Top half ===
First round
1	(Germany) T Maria	6	6^{3}	5
(Hungary) A Bondár	0	7^{7}	7
(United Kingdom) F Jones	7	6
(Ukraine) Y Starodubtseva	5	4
(Australia) A Sharma	3	4
(United States) R Montgomery	6	6
WC	(Mexico) MF Navarro Oliva	4	1
6	(United States) H Baptiste	6	6
3	(Spain) S Sorribes Tormo	7	5	6^{5}
Q	(Romania) A Todoni	5	7	7^{7}
Q	(Italy) N Brancaccio	4	3
(Argentina) J Riera	6	6
Q	(Mexico) J Hinojosa Gómez	4	3
(Netherlands) S Lamens	6	6
(Czech Republic) L Fruhvirtová	6^{2}	6	7^{7}
8	(Argentina) ML Carlé	7^{7}	4	6^{5}

Second round
(Hungary) A Bondár	1	7	2
(United Kingdom) F Jones	6	5	6
(United States) R Montgomery	6	6
6	(United States) H Baptiste	4	1
Q	(Romania) A Todoni	2	1
(Argentina) J Riera	6	6
(Netherlands) S Lamens	2	6	6
(Czech Republic) L Fruhvirtová	6	0	2

Quarterfinals
(United Kingdom) F Jones	6	2	6
(United States) R Montgomery	1	6	4
(Argentina) J Riera	6	6
(Netherlands) S Lamens	4	4

Semifinals
(United Kingdom) F Jones	6	6
(Argentina) J Riera	4	3

=== Bottom half ===
First round
5	E Andreeva	6	6^{4}	6
WC	(Mexico) AS Sánchez	4	7^{7}	2
(Serbia) N Stevanović	4	4
(Italy) L Stefanini	6	6
(Canada) R Marino	2	6	0
WC	(Canada) M Stakusic	6	2	6
(United States) M Kessler	6^{4}	6	3
4	(Argentina) N Podoroska	7^{7}	4	6
7	(France) A Cornet	4	2^{r}
Q	(China) X You	6	4
(Brazil) L Pigossi	7	6
(Slovenia) D Jakupović	5	3
(Slovenia) T Zidanšek	6	6
(Germany) J Niemeier	4	3
(Romania) I Bara	1	2
2/WC	(Italy) E Cocciaretto	6	6

Second round
5	E Andreeva	0^{r}
(Italy) L Stefanini	5
WC	(Canada) M Stakusic	1	6^{5}
4	(Argentina) N Podoroska	6	7^{7}
Q	(China) X You	7	2	5
(Brazil) L Pigossi	5	6	7
(Slovenia) T Zidanšek	6	2	5
2/WC	(Italy) E Cocciaretto	3	6	7

Quarterfinals
(Italy) L Stefanini	2	2
4	(Argentina) N Podoroska	6	6
(Brazil) L Pigossi	0	2
2/WC	(Italy) E Cocciaretto	6	6

Semifinals
4	(Argentina) N Podoroska	6^{5}	7^{7}	6
2/WC	(Italy) E Cocciaretto	7^{7}	6^{5}	2

== Qualifying ==
=== Seeds ===
1. (Ukraine) Katarina Zavatska (qualifying competition)
2. (Canada) Carol Zhao (qualifying competition)
3. (France) Harmony Tan (qualifying competition)
4. (China) You Xiaodi (qualified)

=== Qualifiers ===
1. (Romania) Anca Todoni
2. (Mexico) Jéssica Hinojosa Gómez
3. (Italy) Nuria Brancaccio
4. (China) You Xiaodi

=== Qualifying draw ===
==== First qualifier ====
Qualifying competition
1	(Ukraine) Katarina Zavatska	6	5	3
	(Romania) Anca Todoni	4	7	6

==== Second qualifier ====
Qualifying competition
2	(Canada) Carol Zhao	4	4
WC	(Mexico) Jéssica Hinojosa Gómez	6	6

==== Third qualifier ====
Qualifying competition
3	(France) Harmony Tan	6	1	1
	(Italy) Nuria Brancaccio	4	6	6

==== Fourth qualifier ====
Qualifying competition
4	(China) You Xiaodi	6	7
WC	(Mexico) Victoria Rodríguez	2	5
