= 2026 Palermo Ladies Open – Doubles =

Doubles
- 2026 Palermo Ladies Open

Final
- Champions: Anastasia Tikhonova (Slovenia) Tamara Zidanšek
- Runners-up: (United States) Rasheeda McAdoo (Hungary) Adrienn Nagy
- Score: 6–4, 6–4

Details
- Draw: 16
- Seeds: 4

Events
Singles	Doubles
- Palermo Ladies Open

Anastasia Tikhonova and Tamara Zidanšek won the title, defeating Rasheeda McAdoo and Adrienn Nagy 6–4, 6–4 in the final.

Estelle Cascino and Feng Shuo were the reigning champions, but Feng did not participate. Cascino partnered Sofya Lansere, but lost in the semifinals to McAdoo and Nagy.

== Seeds ==
1. (France) Estelle Cascino / Sofya Lansere (semifinals)
2. (Croatia) Lucija Ćirić Bagarić / (Italy) Angelica Moratelli (semifinals)
3. (Romania) Oana Gavrilă / (United Kingdom) Emily Webley-Smith (first round)
4. (Australia) Gabriella Da Silva-Fick / (Australia) Tenika McGiffin (first round)

== Draw ==
Key

- Q = Qualifier
- WC = Wild card
- LL = Lucky loser
- Alt = Alternate
- ITF = ITF entry
- PR = Protected ranking
- SR = Special ranking
- SE = Special exempt
- JE = Junior exempt
- JR = Junior Accelerator Programme entrant
- CO = College Accelerator Programme entrant
- NG = Next Gen Accelerator Program entrant
- w/o = Walkover
- r = Retired
- d = Defaulted

First round
(Japan) M Ayukawa (Cyprus) R Șerban	w/o
(Italy) N Basiletti (Italy) F Urgesi
3	(Romania) O Gavrilă (United Kingdom) E Webley-Smith	2	4
(Italy) A Abbagnato (Italy) M Tona	6	6
(United States) R McAdoo (Hungary) A Nagy	6	4	[10]
(Morocco) Y Kabbaj (Italy) D Spiteri	1	6	[7]
(Italy) TC Grant; A Ibragimova
(Germany) L Bohner (Germany) M Hodzic	w/o
A Tikhonova (Slovenia) T Zidanšek	6	6^{3}	[15]
4	(Australia) G Da Silva-Fick (Australia) T McGiffin	3	7^{7}	[13]
(Croatia) M Dražić (Bulgaria) I Shinikova	4	0
(Sweden) C Hennemann (Hungary) A Tóth	6	6

Quarterfinals
1	(France) E Cascino; S Lansere	6	6^{4}	[10]
(Japan) M Ayukawa (Cyprus) R Șerban	4	7^{7}	[7]
(Italy) A Abbagnato (Italy) M Tona	5	3
(United States) R McAdoo (Hungary) A Nagy	7	6
(Germany) L Bohner (Germany) M Hodzic	2	6^{3}
A Tikhonova (Slovenia) T Zidanšek	6	7^{7}
(Sweden) C Hennemann (Hungary) A Tóth	1	0
2	(Croatia) L Ćirić Bagarić (Italy) A Moratelli	6	6

Semifinals
1	(France) E Cascino; S Lansere	6	3	[12]
(United States) R McAdoo (Hungary) A Nagy	1	6	[14]
A Tikhonova (Slovenia) T Zidanšek	6	6
2	(Croatia) L Ćirić Bagarić (Italy) A Moratelli	3	4

Final
(United States) R McAdoo (Hungary) A Nagy	4	4
A Tikhonova (Slovenia) T Zidanšek	6	6
