= 2024 San Luis Open Challenger – Men's doubles =

Men's doubles
- 2024 San Luis Open Challenger

Final
- Champions: (India) Rithvik Choudary Bollipalli (India) Niki Kaliyanda Poonacha
- Runners-up: (Switzerland) Antoine Bellier (Switzerland) Marc-Andrea Hüsler
- Score: 6–3, 6–2

Events
Singles	men	women
Doubles	men	women
- San Luis Open Challenger

Colin Sinclair and Adam Walton were the defending champions but chose not to defend their title.

Rithvik Choudary Bollipalli and Niki Kaliyanda Poonacha won the title after defeating Antoine Bellier and Marc-Andrea Hüsler 6–3, 6–2 in the final.

== Seeds ==
1. (United Kingdom) Luke Johnson / (Tunisia) Skander Mansouri (first round)
2. (India) Rithvik Choudary Bollipalli / (India) Niki Kaliyanda Poonacha (champions)
3. (United States) Christian Harrison / (United Kingdom) Joshua Paris (first round)
4. (United States) Ryan Seggerman / (United States) Patrik Trhac (semifinals)

== Draw ==
Key

- Q = Qualifier
- WC = Wild card
- LL = Lucky loser
- Alt = Alternate
- ITF = ITF entry
- PR = Protected ranking
- SR = Special ranking
- SE = Special exempt
- JE = Junior exempt
- JR = Junior Accelerator Programme entrant
- CO = College Accelerator Programme entrant
- NG = Next Gen Accelerator Program entrant
- w/o = Walkover
- r = Retired
- d = Defaulted

=== Draw ===
First round
1	(United Kingdom) L Johnson (Tunisia) S Mansouri	4	3
(Switzerland) A Bellier (Switzerland) M-A Hüsler	6	6
(Austria) D Pichler (Chile) M Soto	7	6
(France) G Mpetshi Perricard (France) L Sanchez	5	4
3	(United States) C Harrison (United Kingdom) J Paris	6^{3}	6^{3}
(United States) M Kiger (Canada) B Sigouin	7^{7}	7^{7}
(Australia) C Puttergill (Australia) T Schoolkate	3	6^{5}
(Zimbabwe) B Lock (New Zealand) R Statham	6	7^{7}
(Argentina) JP Ficovich (Argentina) JP Paz	6	5	[8]
(United States) G Goldhoff (Japan) J Trotter	4	7	[10]
WC	(Mexico) M Sánchez (Australia) B Tomic	6^{3}	6^{5}
4	(United States) R Seggerman (United States) P Trhac	7^{7}	7^{7}
WC	(Mexico) H Hach Verdugo (Canada) V Pospisil	6	6
Alt	(Czech Republic) D Palán (Kazakhstan) B Zhukayev	4	4
(Australia) T Fancutt (United States) H Reese	3	6^{6}
2	(India) RC Bollipalli (India) N Kaliyanda Poonacha	6	7^{8}

Quarterfinals
(Switzerland) A Bellier (Switzerland) M-A Hüsler	6	6
(Austria) D Pichler (Chile) M Soto	4	1
(United States) M Kiger (Canada) B Sigouin	6^{5}	1
(Zimbabwe) B Lock (New Zealand) R Statham	7^{7}	6
(United States) G Goldhoff (Japan) J Trotter	3	7^{7}	[5]
4	(United States) R Seggerman (United States) P Trhac	6	6^{4}	[10]
WC	(Mexico) H Hach Verdugo (Canada) V Pospisil	6^{5}	6	[11]
2	(India) RC Bollipalli (India) N Kaliyanda Poonacha	7^{7}	4	[13]

Semifinals
(Switzerland) A Bellier (Switzerland) M-A Hüsler	6	6
(Zimbabwe) B Lock (New Zealand) R Statham	2	3
4	(United States) R Seggerman (United States) P Trhac	3	4
2	(India) RC Bollipalli (India) N Kaliyanda Poonacha	6	6

Final
(Switzerland) A Bellier (Switzerland) M-A Hüsler	3	2
2	(India) RC Bollipalli (India) N Kaliyanda Poonacha	6	6
