= 2021 Wimbledon Championships – Men's doubles =

Men's doubles
- 2021 Wimbledon Championships

Final
- Champions: (Croatia) Nikola Mektić (Croatia) Mate Pavić
- Runners-up: (Spain) Marcel Granollers (Argentina) Horacio Zeballos
- Score: 6–4, 7–6^{(7–5)}, 2–6, 7–5

Events
Singles	men	women		boys	girls
Doubles	men	women	mixed	boys	girls
WC Singles	men	women	quad	boys	girls
WC Doubles	men	women	quad	boys	girls
- Wimbledon Championships

Nikola Mektić and Mate Pavić defeated Marcel Granollers and Horacio Zeballos in the final, 6–4, 7–6^{(7–5)}, 2–6, 7–5 to win the gentlemen's doubles title at the 2021 Wimbledon Championships. It was their eighth title of the season, with Mektić winning his maiden major doubles title and Pavić winning his third (following the 2018 Australian Open and 2020 US Open). They became the first Croatian pair to win the title.

Juan Sebastián Cabal and Robert Farah were the defending champions from when the tournament was last held in 2019, but lost to Rajeev Ram and Joe Salisbury in the quarterfinals.

Pavić and Nicolas Mahut were in contention for the ATP No. 1 doubles ranking. By winning his first round match, Pavić retained the top ranking.

Because of a delay in schedule due to rain, the first two rounds of the competition were played best-of-three sets instead of the usual best-of-five format.

== Seeds ==
1. (Croatia) Nikola Mektić / (Croatia) Mate Pavić (champions)
2. (France) Pierre-Hugues Herbert / (France) Nicolas Mahut (second round, retired)
3. (Colombia) Juan Sebastián Cabal / (Colombia) Robert Farah (quarterfinals)
4. (Spain) Marcel Granollers / (Argentina) Horacio Zeballos (final)
5. (Croatia) Ivan Dodig / (Slovakia) Filip Polášek (second round)
6. (United States) Rajeev Ram / (United Kingdom) Joe Salisbury (semifinals)
7. (United Kingdom) Jamie Murray / (Brazil) Bruno Soares (second round)
8. (Poland) Łukasz Kubot / (Brazil) Marcelo Melo (quarterfinals)

9. (Germany) Kevin Krawietz / (Romania) Horia Tecău (second round)
10. (Netherlands) Wesley Koolhof / (Netherlands) Jean-Julien Rojer (first round)
11. (Finland) Henri Kontinen / (France) Édouard Roger-Vasselin (second round)
12. (Germany) Tim Pütz / (New Zealand) Michael Venus (first round)
13. (Belgium) Sander Gillé / (Belgium) Joran Vliegen (first round)
14. (South Africa) Raven Klaasen / (Japan) Ben McLachlan (quarterfinals)
15. (New Zealand) Marcus Daniell / (Austria) Philipp Oswald (second round)
16. (Australia) Max Purcell / (Australia) Luke Saville (third round)

Click on the seed number of a player to go to their draw section.

== Draw ==
Key

- Q = Qualifier
- WC = Wild card
- LL = Lucky loser
- Alt = Alternate
- ITF = ITF entry
- PR = Protected ranking
- SR = Special ranking
- SE = Special exempt
- JE = Junior exempt
- JR = Junior Accelerator Programme entrant
- CO = College Accelerator Programme entrant
- NG = Next Gen Accelerator Program entrant
- w/o = Walkover
- r = Retired
- d = Defaulted

=== Finals ===
Quarterfinals
1	(Croatia) Nikola Mektić (Croatia) Mate Pavić	3	4	6	7^{7}	6
8	(Poland) Łukasz Kubot (Brazil) Marcelo Melo	6	6	4	6^{4}	4
3	(Colombia) Juan Sebastián Cabal (Colombia) Robert Farah	3	4	6^{2}
6	(United States) Rajeev Ram (United Kingdom) Joe Salisbury	6	6	7^{7}
(Sweden) André Göransson (Norway) Casper Ruud	3	4	4
4	(Spain) Marcel Granollers (Argentina) Horacio Zeballos	6	6	6
(Italy) Simone Bolelli (Argentina) Máximo González	7^{7}	6	6
14	(South Africa) Raven Klaasen (Japan) Ben McLachlan	6^{0}	4	3

Semifinals
1	(Croatia) Nikola Mektić (Croatia) Mate Pavić	7^{8}	6	6^{2}	7^{7}
6	(United States) Rajeev Ram (United Kingdom) Joe Salisbury	6^{6}	3	7^{7}	6^{5}
4	(Spain) Marcel Granollers (Argentina) Horacio Zeballos	6	6	7^{7}
(Italy) Simone Bolelli (Argentina) Máximo González	4	4	6^{3}

Final
1	(Croatia) Nikola Mektić (Croatia) Mate Pavić	6	7^{7}	2	7
4	(Spain) Marcel Granollers (Argentina) Horacio Zeballos	4	6^{5}	6	5

=== Top half ===
==== Section 1 ====
First round
1	(Croatia) N Mektić (Croatia) M Pavić	6	6
(Israel) J Erlich (Belarus) A Vasilevski	2	4
(Australia) A de Minaur (Australia) M Reid	7^{7}	6
WC	(United Kingdom) L Johnson (United Kingdom) A Matusevich	6^{3}	2
(Bosnia and Herzegovina) T Brkić (Serbia) N Ćaćić	7^{7}	6
(Belarus) E Gerasimov (Japan) Y Nishioka	6^{1}	4
WC	(United Kingdom) J Clarke (Romania) M Copil	3	6	3
15	(New Zealand) M Daniell (Austria) P Oswald	6	3	6
10	(Netherlands) W Koolhof (Netherlands) J-J Rojer	7	3	4
WC	(United Kingdom) L Glasspool (Finland) H Heliövaara	5	6	6
PR	(Czech Republic) R Jebavý (Czech Republic) J Veselý	6^{1}	3
WC	(United Kingdom) A Gray (United Kingdom) A McHugh	7^{7}	6
(Netherlands) S Arends (Netherlands) M Middelkoop	7^{7}	4	6
(Germany) A Begemann (Austria) J Melzer	6^{2}	6	2
Alt	(United States) N Lammons (United States) J Withrow	4	7	4
8	(Poland) Ł Kubot (Brazil) M Melo	6	5	6

Second round
1	(Croatia) N Mektić (Croatia) M Pavić	6	6
(Australia) A de Minaur (Australia) M Reid	2	4
(Bosnia and Herzegovina) T Brkić (Serbia) N Ćaćić	6	1	13^{8}
15	(New Zealand) M Daniell (Austria) P Oswald	3	6	12^{6}
WC	(United Kingdom) L Glasspool (Finland) H Heliövaara	4	6	8
WC	(United Kingdom) A Gray (United Kingdom) A McHugh	6	3	6
(Netherlands) S Arends (Netherlands) M Middelkoop	2	4
8	(Poland) Ł Kubot (Brazil) M Melo	6	6

Third round
1	(Croatia) N Mektić (Croatia) M Pavić	6	3	7^{7}	6
(Bosnia and Herzegovina) T Brkić (Serbia) N Ćaćić	2	6	6^{3}	4
WC	(United Kingdom) L Glasspool (Finland) H Heliövaara
8	(Poland) Ł Kubot (Brazil) M Melo	w/o

Quarterfinals
1	(Croatia) N Mektić (Croatia) M Pavić	3	4	6	7^{7}	6
8	(Poland) Ł Kubot (Brazil) M Melo	6	6	4	6^{4}	4

==== Section 2 ====
First round
3	(Colombia) JS Cabal (Colombia) R Farah	6	6
Alt	(Chinese Taipei) Y-h Lu (Netherlands) D Pel	2	4
(Kazakhstan) A Bublik (Kazakhstan) A Nedovyesov	4	6	12^{4}
Alt	(Brazil) R Matos (Brazil) T Monteiro	6	3	13^{7}
WC	(United Kingdom) S Parker (United Kingdom) J Ward	6^{6}	4
(United Kingdom) L Bambridge (United Kingdom) D Inglot	7^{8}	6
(Australia) J Peers (Australia) J Thompson	6	6^{4}	4
16	(Australia) M Purcell (Australia) L Saville	3	7^{7}	6
12	(Germany) T Pütz (New Zealand) M Venus	6	6^{4}	11
(Australia) M Ebden (Australia) J-P Smith	1	7^{7}	13
(Uruguay) A Behar (Ecuador) G Escobar	6	7^{7}
(Monaco) H Nys (United Kingdom) J O'Mara	4	6^{3}
(Moldova) R Albot (Georgia (country)) N Basilashvili	6	2	2
(Hungary) M Fucsovics (Italy) S Travaglia	3	6	6
(Serbia) L Đere (Italy) G Mager	1	2
6	(United States) R Ram (United Kingdom) J Salisbury	6	6

Second round
3	(Colombia) JS Cabal (Colombia) R Farah	6	7^{7}
Alt	(Brazil) R Matos (Brazil) T Monteiro	2	6^{5}
(United Kingdom) L Bambridge (United Kingdom) D Inglot	2	4
16	(Australia) M Purcell (Australia) L Saville	6	6
(Australia) M Ebden (Australia) J-P Smith	6^{5}	7^{7}	4
(Uruguay) A Behar (Ecuador) G Escobar	7^{7}	6^{4}	6
(Hungary) M Fucsovics (Italy) S Travaglia	3	4
6	(United States) R Ram (United Kingdom) J Salisbury	6	6

Third round
3	(Colombia) JS Cabal (Colombia) R Farah	6	6	2	6
16	(Australia) M Purcell (Australia) L Saville	3	4	6	4
(Uruguay) A Behar (Ecuador) G Escobar	3	3	6^{10}
6	(United States) R Ram (United Kingdom) J Salisbury	6	6	7^{12}

Quarterfinals
3	(Colombia) JS Cabal (Colombia) R Farah	3	4	6^{2}
6	(United States) R Ram (United Kingdom) J Salisbury	6	6	7^{7}

=== Bottom half ===
==== Section 3 ====
First round
5	(Croatia) I Dodig (Slovakia) F Polášek	6	6
Alt	(Slovakia) N Gombos (Spain) P Martínez	2	1
WC	(Greece) Pe Tsitsipas (Greece) S Tsitsipas	5	6^{5}
(Spain) J Munar (United Kingdom) C Norrie	7	7^{7}
(Sweden) A Göransson (Norway) C Ruud	7	4	11
PR	(Spain) F López (Spain) M López	5	6	9
(Italy) S Caruso (Spain) A Davidovich Fokina	3	6^{1}
9	(Germany) K Krawietz (Romania) H Tecău	6	7^{7}
13	(Belgium) S Gillé (Belgium) J Vliegen	4	4
(Austria) O Marach (Pakistan) A-u-H Qureshi	6	6
(South Africa) L Harris (Australia) A Popyrin	6	7^{7}
(United States) A Krajicek (United States) T Sandgren	4	6^{4}
(United Kingdom) K Skupski (United Kingdom) N Skupski	7	6
WC	(United Kingdom) L Broady (United Kingdom) R Peniston	5	3
(Serbia) D Lajović (Croatia) I Sabanov	3	4
4	(Spain) M Granollers (Argentina) H Zeballos	6	6

Second round
5	(Croatia) I Dodig (Slovakia) F Polášek	6^{10}	6	5
(Spain) J Munar (United Kingdom) C Norrie	7^{12}	1	7
(Sweden) A Göransson (Norway) C Ruud	6	7^{7}
9	(Germany) K Krawietz (Romania) H Tecău	4	6^{4}
(Austria) O Marach (Pakistan) A-u-H Qureshi	7^{8}	3	6
(South Africa) L Harris (Australia) A Popyrin	6^{6}	6	3
(United Kingdom) K Skupski (United Kingdom) N Skupski	4	7^{7}	8
4	(Spain) M Granollers (Argentina) H Zeballos	6	6^{5}	10

Third round
(Spain) J Munar (United Kingdom) C Norrie	3^{r}
(Sweden) A Göransson (Norway) C Ruud	4
(Austria) O Marach (Pakistan) A-u-H Qureshi	4	6^{4}	6^{3}
4	(Spain) M Granollers (Argentina) H Zeballos	6	7^{7}	7^{7}

Quarterfinals
(Sweden) A Göransson (Norway) C Ruud	3	4	4
4	(Spain) M Granollers (Argentina) H Zeballos	6	6	6

==== Section 4 ====
First round
7	(United Kingdom) J Murray (Brazil) B Soares	6	6^{5}	6
(United States) N Monroe (Canada) V Pospisil	1	7^{7}	1
(Kazakhstan) A Golubev (Netherlands) R Haase	6^{6}	6	6
(Brazil) M Demoliner (Mexico) S González	7^{8}	4	4
(Serbia) F Krajinović (Croatia) M Sabanov	3	7^{7}	3
(Italy) S Bolelli (Argentina) M González	6	6^{4}	6
(India) R Bopanna (India) D Sharan	6^{6}	4
11	(Finland) H Kontinen (France) É Roger-Vasselin	7^{8}	6
14	(South Africa) R Klaasen (Japan) B McLachlan	6^{3}	6	6
(Argentina) A Molteni (Italy) A Vavassori	7^{7}	4	4
Alt	(Monaco) R Arneodo (Slovakia) I Zelenay	6^{4}	6	7
(Lithuania) R Berankis (Germany) D Koepfer	7^{7}	3	9
(France) J Chardy (France) F Martin	6	6
(Argentina) F Delbonis (New Zealand) A Sitak	3	2
(Argentina) F Bagnis (Spain) A Ramos Viñolas	1	3
2	(France) P-H Herbert (France) N Mahut	6	6

Second round
7	(United Kingdom) J Murray (Brazil) B Soares	7^{7}	3	2
(Kazakhstan) A Golubev (Netherlands) R Haase	6^{3}	6	6
(Italy) S Bolelli (Argentina) M González	7^{7}	6
11	(Finland) H Kontinen (France) É Roger-Vasselin	6^{5}	2
14	(South Africa) R Klaasen (Japan) B McLachlan	2	6	6
(Lithuania) R Berankis (Germany) D Koepfer	6	3	4
(France) J Chardy (France) F Martin	6	0
2	(France) P-H Herbert (France) N Mahut	4	0^{r}

Third round
(Kazakhstan) A Golubev (Netherlands) R Haase	3	3	2
(Italy) S Bolelli (Argentina) M González	6	6	6
14	(South Africa) R Klaasen (Japan) B McLachlan	6^{4}	6	6^{5}	7^{7}	7
(France) J Chardy (France) F Martin	7^{7}	4	7^{7}	6^{5}	5

Quarterfinals
(Italy) S Bolelli (Argentina) M González	7^{7}	6	6
14	(South Africa) R Klaasen (Japan) B McLachlan	6^{0}	4	3

== Other entry information ==
=== Wild cards ===
- (United Kingdom) Liam Broady / (United Kingdom) Ryan Peniston
- (United Kingdom) Jay Clarke / (Romania) Marius Copil
- (United Kingdom) Lloyd Glasspool / (Finland) Harri Heliövaara
- (United Kingdom) Alastair Gray / (United Kingdom) Aidan McHugh
- (United Kingdom) Luke Johnson / (United Kingdom) Anton Matusevich
- (United Kingdom) Stuart Parker / (United Kingdom) James Ward
- (Greece) Petros Tsitsipas / (Greece) Stefanos Tsitsipas

=== Protected ranking ===
- (Czech Republic) Roman Jebavý / (Czech Republic) Jiří Veselý
- (Spain) Feliciano López / (Spain) Marc López

=== Alternates ===
- (Monaco) Romain Arneodo / (Slovakia) Igor Zelenay
- (Slovakia) Norbert Gombos / (Spain) Pedro Martínez
- (United States) Nathaniel Lammons / (United States) Jackson Withrow
- (Chinese Taipei) Lu Yen-hsun / (Netherlands) David Pel
- (Brazil) Rafael Matos / (Brazil) Thiago Monteiro

=== Withdrawals ===
During the tournament

- (United Kingdom) Lloyd Glasspool / (Finland) Harri Heliövaara

=== Retirements ===
- (France) Pierre-Hugues Herbert / (France) Nicolas Mahut
- (Spain) Jaume Munar / (United Kingdom) Cameron Norrie

== See also ==
- 2021 Wimbledon Championships – Day-by-day summaries
