= 2025 Palermo Ladies Open =

- Date: 21–27 July
- Edition: 33rd
- Category: WTA 125 tournaments
- Draw: 32S / 16D
- Surface: Clay / outdoor
- Location: Palermo, Italy
- Venue: Country Time Club

Champions

Singles
- (United Kingdom) Francesca Jones

Doubles
- (France) Estelle Cascino / (China) Feng Shuo
- Palermo Ladies Open

The 2025 Palermo Ladies Open was a professional women's tennis tournament played on outdoor clay courts at the Country Time Club. It was the 33rd edition of the tournament and part of the 2025 WTA 125 tournaments (downgraded from WTA 250 status in previous years). It took place in Palermo, Italy, between 21 and 27 July 2025.

== Singles main draw entrants ==
=== Seeds ===
Country	Player	Rank^{1}	Seed
EGY	Mayar Sherif	99	1
~~SUI~~	~~Jil Teichmann~~	~~102~~	~~2~~
GBR	Francesca Jones	104	3
LAT	Darja Semeņistaja	121	4
ROU	Simona Waltert	127	5
AND	Victoria Jiménez Kasintseva	130	6
ESP	Leyre Romero Gormaz	133	7
SLO	Veronika Erjavec	137	8
AUT	Julia Grabher	138	9

- ^{†} Rankings are as of 14 July 2025

=== Other entrants ===
The following players received wildcards into the main draw:

- (Italy) Silvia Ambrosio
- (Italy) Tyra Caterina Grant
- (Italy) Giorgia Pedone
- (Italy) Dalila Spiteri

The following player received entry using a protected ranking:

- (United States) Claire Liu

The following players received entry from the qualifying draw:

- (Slovakia) Renáta Jamrichová
- (Spain) Carlota Martínez Círez
- (Spain) Kaitlin Quevedo
- (France) Alice Ramé

The following players received entry as lucky losers:

- (Spain) Ángela Fita Boluda
- (Italy) Aurora Zantedeschi

== Doubles main draw entrants ==
=== Seeds ===
Country	Player	Country	Player	Rank^{1}	Seed
JPN	Momoko Kobori	JPN	Ayano Shimizu	273	1
TPE	Cho I-hsuan	TPE	Cho Yi-tsen	290	2
FRA	Estelle Cascino	CHN	Feng Shuo	296	3
ALG	Inès Ibbou	SUI	Naïma Karamoko	375	4

- ^{†} Rankings are as of 14 July 2025

== Champions ==
=== Singles ===
- (United Kingdom) Francesca Jones def. (Netherlands) Anouk Koevermans, 6–3, 6–2

=== Doubles ===
- (France) Estelle Cascino / (China) Feng Shuo def. (Japan) Momoko Kobori / (Japan) Ayano Shimizu, 6–2, 6–7^{(2–7)}, [10–7]
