= 2026 Palermo Ladies Open =

- Date: 20–26 July
- Edition: 34th
- Category: WTA 125
- Draw: 32S / 16D
- Prize money: €100,000
- Surface: Clay / outdoor
- Location: Palermo, Italy
- Venue: Country Time Club

Champions

Singles
- (United Kingdom) Francesca Jones

Doubles
- Anastasia Tikhonova / (Slovenia) Tamara Zidanšek
- Palermo Ladies Open

The 2026 Palermo Ladies Open was a professional women's tennis tournament played on outdoor clay courts at the Country Time Club. It was the 34th edition of the tournament and part of the 2026 WTA 125 tournaments. It took place in Palermo, Italy, between 20 and 26 July 2026.

== Singles main draw entrants ==
=== Seeds ===
Country	Player	Rank^{1}	Seed
GBR	Francesca Jones	123	1
ITA	Lucia Bronzetti	139	2
~~ITA~~	~~Tyra Caterina Grant~~	~~141~~	~~3~~
SLO	Tamara Zidanšek	148	4
SRB	Lola Radivojević	156	5
GEO	Ekaterine Gorgodze	176	6
FRA	Fiona Ferro	189	7
BUL	Elizara Yaneva	196	8

- ^{†} Rankings are as of 13 July 2026

=== Other entrants ===
The following players received wildcards into the main draw:

- (Italy) Anastasia Abbagnato
- (Italy) Deborah Chiesa
- (Italy) Alessandra Mazzola
- (Italy) Ilary Pistola

The following players received entry from the qualifying draw:

- (Italy) Noemi Basiletti
- (Germany) Mina Hodzic
- (China) Ren Yufei
- (Hungary) Amarissa Tóth

The following player received entry as a lucky loser:

- (Cyprus) Raluca Șerban

=== Withdrawals ===
Before the tournament

- (Spain) Marina Bassols Ribera → replaced by (Italy) Federica Urgesi
- (Italy) Tyra Caterina Grant → replaced by (Cyprus) Raluca Șerban (LL)
- (Spain) Guiomar Maristany → replaced by (Italy) Dalila Spiteri
- (Argentina) Jazmín Ortenzi → replaced by (Spain) Ane Mintegi del Olmo
- (France) Tiantsoa Rakotomanga Rajaonah → replaced by Anastasia Tikhonova
- (France) Alice Tubello → replaced by Alevtina Ibragimova
- (Belgium) Jeline Vandromme → replaced by (Sweden) Caijsa Hennemann
- Anastasia Zolotareva → replaced by Sofya Lansere

During the tournament

- (Italy) Federica Urgesi (stomach virus)

== Doubles main draw entrants ==
=== Seeds ===
Country	Player	Country	Player	Rank^{1}	Seed
FRA	Estelle Cascino		Sofya Lansere	261	1
CRO	Lucija Ćirić Bagarić	ITA	Angelica Moratelli	359	2
ROU	Oana Gavrilă	GBR	Emily Webley-Smith	376	3
AUS	Gabriella Da Silva-Fick	AUS	Tenika McGiffin	380	4

- ^{†} Rankings are as of 13 July 2026

=== Withdrawals ===
During the tournament

- (Italy) Noemi Basiletti / (Italy) Federica Urgesi (Urgesi – stomach virus)
- (Italy) Tyra Caterina Grant / Alevtina Ibragimova (Grant – neck injury)

== Champions ==
=== Singles ===
- (United Kingdom) Francesca Jones def. (France) Fiona Ferro 6–0, 4–6, 7–6^{(8–6)}

=== Doubles ===
- Anastasia Tikhonova / (Slovenia) Tamara Zidanšek def. (United States) Rasheeda McAdoo / (Hungary) Adrienn Nagy 6–4, 6–4
