= Francesca Jones (tennis) =

British tennis player (born 2000)

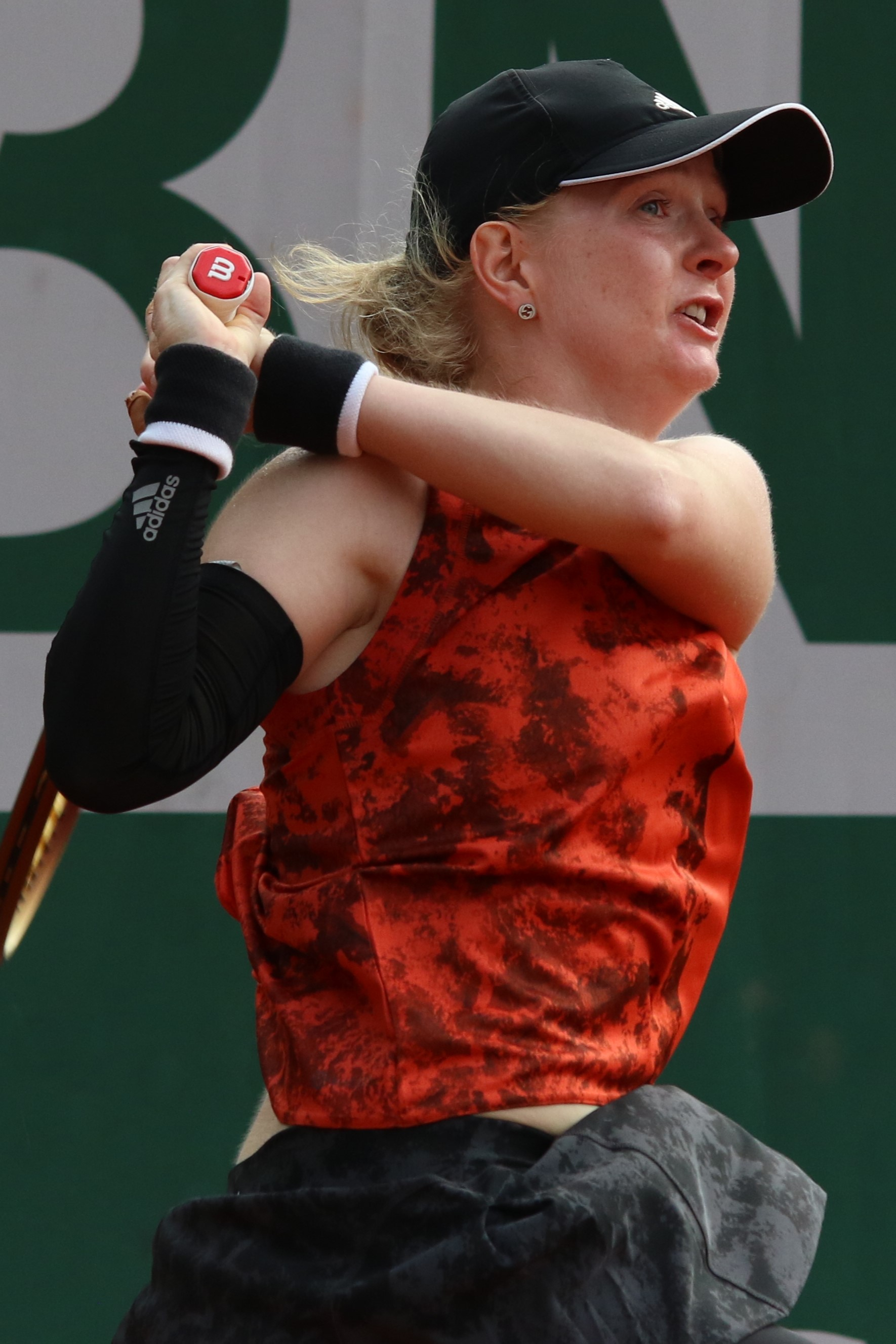
- Jones at the 2023 French Open
- Country (sports): Great Britain
- Born: 19 September 2000 (age 26) Bradford, England
- Height: 1.73 m (5 ft 8 in)
- Plays: Right (two-handed backhand)
- Prize money: US$ 1,698,233

Singles
- Career record: 276–153
- Career titles: 4 WTA 125
- Highest ranking: No. 65 (9 February 2026)
- Current ranking: No. 99 (19 October 2026)

Grand Slam singles results
- Australian Open: 1R (2021, 2026)
- French Open: 2R (2026)
- Wimbledon: 1R (2021, 2024, 2025, 2026)
- US Open: 2R (2026)

Doubles
- Career record: 10–6
- Career titles: 0
- Highest ranking: No. 541 (22 February 2021)
- Last updated on: 19 October 2026.

Francesca Jones (born 19 September 2000) is a British professional tennis player. She has a career-high singles ranking of No. 65 by the WTA, achieved on 9 February 2026. Jones has won four WTA 125 titles and breaking into the top 100, after winning 2025 Palermo Ladies Open in Italy. She had a career-high ITF juniors ranking of world No. 31, achieved on 1 May 2017.

== Career ==
=== 2021: WTA Tour and major debuts ===
At 20 years of age, Jones made her Grand Slam tournament debut at the Australian Open, after coming through qualifying, losing in the first round to Shelby Rogers. She had made her WTA Tour debut a couple of weeks earlier, at the Yarra Valley Classic, falling in the first round to 14th seed Nadia Podoroska. Given a wildcard entry, Jones made her maiden main-draw appearance at Wimbledon, losing to 14th seed Coco Gauff in the first round.

=== 2023: First WTA Tour semifinal ===
Using her protected ranking, Jones reached her first tour semifinal defeating third seed Nuria Parrizas-Diaz, Carol Zhao, and sixth seed Laura Pigossi at the Copa Colsanitas in Bogotá, Colombia, before losing to second seed and the eventual champion, Tatjana Maria.

=== 2024: First WTA 125 final ===
Wins over Yulia Starodubtseva, Anna Bondár, Robin Montgomery and Julia Riera saw Jones reach her first WTA 125 final at the San Luis Open which she lost to Nadia Podoroska in straight sets. As a result, she moved more than 50 positions back up in the rankings to No. 214 on 1 April.

Ranked No. 249, she reached her second career quarterfinal and first on grass at the Nottingham Open as a wildcard entrant defeating eighth seed Caroline Dolehide and Ashlyn Krueger. She withdrew, before taking the court for her quarterfinal match against Emma Raducanu due to a shoulder injury.

Jones received a wildcard entry for Wimbledon, losing in three sets to Petra Martić in the first round.

At the WTA 125 Ljubljana Open, she overcame top seed Chloé Paquet, Petra Marčinko and Victoria Jiménez Kasintseva to make it through to the semifinals, where her run was ended by eventual champion Jil Teichmann.

=== 2025: WTA 125 title, US Open debut, top 100 ===
Jones qualified for the Transylvania Open, but lost in the first round to fifth seed Kateřina Siniaková in three sets. The following week, she reached the semifinals at the WTA 125 Cancún Open, with wins over Aliona Bolsova, Sachia Vickery and Iryna Shymanovich, before losing to eventual champion Emiliana Arango. Remaining in Mexico the next week, Jones qualified for the Mérida Open and overcame Mayar Sherif in the first round. She retired during the third set of her next match against fellow qualifier Emiliana Arango.

In March, Jones won the W75 Vacaria Open in Brazil defeating Léolia Jeanjean in the final. At the Copa Colsanitas in Colombia in the first week of April, she collapsed while serving in the third set of her first round match against Julia Riera and was taken off court in a wheelchair. Jones qualified to make her WTA 1000 main-draw debut at the Madrid Open, losing to Dayana Yastremska in the first round.

Wins over Lea Bošković and Mai Hontama saw her reach the final qualifying round at the French Open, where her run was ended by Anastasiia Sobolieva.

Moving onto the grass-court season, Jones entered the Nottingham Open thanks to a wildcard and defeated Harriet Dart in the first round, before losing to seventh seed Linda Nosková in her next match. The following week at the Eastbourne Open, she again entered the main draw thanks to a wildcard and defeated qualifier Greet Minnen to reach the second round, where she lost to Dayana Yastremska. She was awarded a wildcard into the main draw debut at Wimbledon, but lost to Yuliia Starodubtseva in the first round.

Back on clay courts later in July, Jones won her first WTA 125 title at Contrexéville, defeating Elsa Jacquemot in the final. As a result, she reached a new career-high ranking of world No. 104 on 14 July 2025. Two weeks later, Jones claimed her second WTA 125 title at the Palermo Ladies Open, going the entire tournament without dropping a set and defeating Anouk Koevermans in the final, a result which saw her enter the world's top 100 for the first time, at No. 84 on 28 July 2025.

Entering the US Open as top seed in qualifying, Jones recorded straight-sets wins over Viktória Hrunčáková, Ekaterine Gorgodze and Arianne Hartono to make it into the main draw at the event for the first time. She lost to Eva Lys in the first round.

In September at the SP Open in Brazil, she defeated second seed Solana Sierra in the quarterfinals to reach her second WTA Tour semifinal, but lost to Janice Tjen. As a result of her run at the tournament, Jones achieved a new career-high ranking of world No. 73, on 15 September 2025.

=== 2026: Top 15, major and WTA 1000 wins ===
Jones started her 2026 season at the Auckland Open in New Zealand where she recorded her first win against a top-15 ranked player, defeating world No. 15 and second seed, Emma Navarro, in the first round. She then overcame qualifier Sinja Kraus in three sets to reach the quarterfinals. Jones retired due to a thigh injury having lost the first set of her last eight match against Wang Xinyu.

At the Australian Open, Jones gained direct entry into the main draw of a major for the first time thanks to her ranking. However, she retired in the first round due to a gluteal injury in her right leg, having lost the opening set against qualifier Linda Klimovičová.

In March at the Miami Open, Jones defeated Venus Williams in the opening round to record her first WTA 1000-level win, before retiring while trailing by a set and a break of serve against fifth seed Jessica Pegula in her next match.

Jones gained direct entry via her ranking to make her main-draw debut at the French Open and defeated Beatriz Haddad Maia in three sets for her first win at a Grand Slam tournament at her seventh attempt. She lost to 27th seed Marie Bouzková in the second round. At Wimbledon, she once again gained direct entry into the main draw for the third major in a row but lost to Diane Parry in the first round.

Back on clay courts in July, Jones won her third WTA 125 title at the ATV Tennis Open in Rome, defeating Lucia Bronzetti in the final. The following week as top seed she retained her title at the Palermo Ladies Open, overcoming Fiona Ferro in the final which was decided in a third set tiebreak.

Switching to hardcourts, the next month in the qualifying rounds at the US Open, Jones defeated Nuria Brancaccio, Mona Barthel, and Joanna Garland to make it into the main draw for the second year in a row. She overcame Magda Linette for her first main-draw win at this major in a three set match which was played over two days due to a number of rain delays. Jones lost to 14th seed Iva Jovic in the second round.

== Personal life ==
She was born with a thumb and three fingers on each hand, and with only seven toes, as a result of a rare genetic condition, ectrodactyly–ectodermal dysplasia–cleft syndrome (EEC).

== Performance timeline ==
Key
W	F	SF	QF	#R	RR	Q#	P#	DNQ	A	Z#	PO	G	S	B	NMS	NTI	P	NH

(W) winner; (F) finalist; (SF) semifinalist; (QF) quarterfinalist; (#R) rounds 4, 3, 2, 1; (RR) round-robin stage; (Q#) qualification round; (P#) preliminary round; (DNQ) did not qualify; (A) absent; (Z#) Davis/Fed Cup Zonal Group (with number indication) or (PO) play-off; (G) gold, (S) silver or (B) bronze Olympic/Paralympic medal; (NMS) not a Masters tournament; (NTI) not a Tier I tournament; (P) postponed; (NH) not held; (SR) strike rate (events won / competed); (W–L) win–loss record.
To avoid confusion and double counting, these charts are updated at the conclusion of a tournament or when the player's participation has ended.

Only main-draw results in WTA Tour, Grand Slam tournaments, Fed Cup/Billie Jean King Cup, and Olympic Games are included in win–loss records.

=== Singles ===
Current through the 2026 US Open.

Tournament	2017	2018	2019	2020	2021	2022	2023	2024	2025	2026	SR	W–L	Win %
Grand Slam tournaments
Australian Open	A	A	A	A	1R	Q1	A	Q2	Q2	1R	0 / 2	0–2	0%
French Open	A	A	A	A	Q1	A	Q2	A	Q3	2R	0 / 1	1–1	50%
Wimbledon	A	Q1	Q1	NH	1R	A	A	1R	1R	1R	0 / 4	0–4	0%
US Open	A	A	A	A	Q2	A	A	Q2	1R	2R	0 / 2	1–2	33%
Win–loss	0–0	0–0	0–0	0–0	0–2	0–0	0–0	0–1	0–2	2–4	0 / 9	2–9	18%
WTA 1000 tournaments
Qatar Open	NTI	A	NTI	A	NTI	A	NTI	A	A	A	0 / 0	0–0	–
Dubai Championships	A	NTI	A	NTI	A	NTI	A	A	A	A	0 / 0	0–0	–
Indian Wells Open	A	A	A	NH	A	A	A	A	A	1R	0 / 1	0–1	0%
Miami Open	A	A	A	NH	A	A	A	A	A	2R	0 / 1	1–1	50%
Madrid Open	A	A	A	NH	A	A	A	A	1R	A	0 / 1	0–1	0%
Italian Open	A	A	A	A	A	A	A	A	A	A	0 / 0	0–0	–
Canadian Open	A	A	A	NH	A	A	A	A	A	A	0 / 0	0–0	–
Cincinnati Open	A	A	A	A	A	A	A	A	A	A	0 / 0	0–0	–
China Open	A	A	A	Not Held			A	A	A		0 / 0	0–0	–
Wuhan Open	A	A	A	Not Held				A	A		0 / 0	0–0	–
Win–loss	0–0	0–0	0–0	0–0	0–0	0–0	0–0	0–0	0–1	1–2	0 / 3	1–3	25%
Career statistics
	2017	2018	2019	2020	2021	2022	2023	2024	2025	2026	SR	W–L	Win %
Tournaments	0	0	0	0	6	0	1	3	12	12	Career total: 34		
Titles	0	0	0	0	0	0	0	0	0	0	Career total: 0		
Finals	0	0	0	0	0	0	0	0	0	0	Career total: 0		
Hard win–loss	0–0	0–0	0–0	0–0	1–3	0–0	0–0	0–0	4–6	3–5	0 / 14	8–14	36%
Clay win–loss	0–0	0–0	0–0	0–0	0–0	0–0	3–1	1–1	0–2	1–3	0 / 7	5–7	42%
Grass win–loss	0–0	0–0	0–0	0–0	0–3	0–0	0–0	2–1	2–4	3–4	0 / 12	7–12	37%
Overall win–loss	0–0	0–0	0–0	0–0	1–6	0–0	3–1	3–2	6–12	7–12	0 / 33	20–33	38%
Win %	–	–	–	–	14%	–	75%	60%	33%	37%	Career total: 38%		
Year-end ranking	817	399	347	241	151	348	288	160	77		Career high: No. 65		

=== Doubles ===
Current through the 2026 US Open.

Tournament	2017	2018	2019	2020	2021	2022	2023	2024	2025	2026	SR	W–L
Grand Slam tournaments
Australian Open	A	A	A	A	A	A	A	A	A	A	0 / 0	0–0
French Open	A	A	A	A	A	A	A	A	A	A	0 / 0	0–0
Wimbledon	A	A	A	NH	A	A	A	A	A	A	0 / 0	0–0
US Open	A	A	A	A	A	A	A	A	A		0 / 0	0–0
Win–loss	0–0	0–0	0–0	0–0	0–0	0–0	0–0	0–0	0–0	0–0	0 / 0	0–0
WTA 1000 tournaments
Qatar Open	A	A	A	A	A	A	A	A	A	A	0 / 0	0–0
Dubai Open	A	A	A	A	A	A	A	A	A	A	0 / 0	0–0
Indian Wells Open	A	A	A	NH	A	A	A	A	A	A	0 / 0	0–0
Miami Open	A	A	A	NH	A	A	A	A	A	A	0 / 0	0–0
Madrid Open	A	A	A	NH	A	A	A	A	A	A	0 / 0	0–0
Italian Open	A	A	A	A	A	A	A	A	A	A	0 / 0	0–0
Canadian Open	A	A	A	NH	A	A	A	A	A		0 / 0	0–0
Cincinnati Open	A	A	A	A	A	A	A	A	A		0 / 0	0–0
China Open	A	A	A	NH	NH	NH	NH	A	A		0 / 0	0–0
Wuhan Open	A	A	A	NH	NH	NH	NH	A	A		0 / 0	0–0
Win–loss	0–0	0–0	0–0	0–0	0–0	0–0	0–0	0–0	0–0	0–0	0 / 0	0–0
Career statistics
	2017	2018	2019	2020	2021	2022	2023	2024	2025	2026	SR	W–L
Tournaments	0	0	0	0	1	0	0	0	0	0	Career total: 1	
Titles	0	0	0	0	0	0	0	0	0	0	Career total: 0	
Finals	0	0	0	0	0	0	0	0	0	0	Career total: 0	
Hard win–loss	0–0	0–0	0–0	0–0	3–1	0–0	0–0	0–0	0–0	0–0	0 / 1	3–1
Clay win–loss	0–0	0–0	0–0	0–0	0–0	0–0	0–0	0–0	0–0	0–0	0 / 0	0–0
Grass win–loss	0–0	0–0	0–0	0–0	0–0	0–0	0–0	0–0	0–0	0–0	0 / 0	0–0
Overall win–loss	0–0	0–0	0–0	0–0	3–1	0–0	0–0	0–0	0–0	0–0	0 / 1	3–1

== WTA 125 finals ==
=== Singles: 5 (4 titles, 1 runner-up) ===
Result	W–L	Date	Tournament	Surface	Opponent	Score
Loss	0–1	Mar 2024	San Luis Open, Mexico	Clay	(Argentina) Nadia Podoroska	1–6, 2–6
Win	1–1	Jul 2025	Contrexéville Open, France	Clay	(France) Elsa Jacquemot	6–4, 7–6^{(7–2)}
Win	2–1	Jul 2025	Palermo Ladies Open, Italy	Clay	(Netherlands) Anouk Koevermans	6–3, 6–2
Win	3–1	Jul 2026	ATV Rome Open, Italy	Clay	(Italy) Lucia Bronzetti	6–3, 6–1
Win	4–1	Jul 2026	Palermo Ladies Open, Italy (2)	Clay	(France) Fiona Ferro	6–0, 4–6, 7–6^{(8–6)}

== ITF Circuit finals ==
=== Singles: 15 (9 titles, 6 runner-ups) ===
Legend W60/75 tournaments (4–1) W25/35 tournaments (2–3) W15 tournaments (3–2)	Finals by surface Clay (9–6)

Result	W–L	Date	Tournament	Tier	Surface	Opponent	Score
Loss	0–1	Sep 2017	ITF Hammamet, Tunisia	W15	Clay	(United Kingdom) Emily Arbuthnott	6–3, 5–7, 4–6
Win	1–1	Nov 2017	ITF Asunción, Paraguay	W15	Clay	(Chile) Fernanda Brito	6–3, 7–6^{(0)}
Win	2–1	Apr 2018	ITF Villa Dolores, Argentina	W15	Clay	(Argentina) Victoria Bosio	4–6, 6–4, 6–2
Loss	2–2	Jul 2018	ITF Vienna, Austria	W15	Clay	(Poland) Marta Leśniak	0–6, 3–6
Win	3–2	Jul 2018	Tampere Open, Finland	W15	Clay	(Serbia) Bojana Marinković	6–2, 7–6^{(2)}
Win	4–2	Jun 2019	ITF Minsk, Belarus	W25	Clay	(Germany) Stephanie Wagner	6–3, 1–6, 6–2
Win	5–2	Jun 2019	ITF Minsk, Belarus	W25	Clay	(Romania) Jaqueline Cristian	7–6^{(6)}, 4–6, 6–1
Loss	5–3	Apr 2021	ITF Villa Maria, Argentina	W25	Clay	(Brazil) Beatriz Haddad Maia	7–5, 4–6, 2–6
Win	6–3	Jul 2021	Open de Biarritz, France	W60	Clay	(Russia) Oksana Selekhmeteva	6–4, 7–6^{(4)}
Loss	6–4	Sep 2021	Montreux Ladies Open, Switzerland	W60	Clay	(Brazil) Beatriz Haddad Maia	4–6, 3–6
Loss	6–5	Apr 2023	ITF Guayaquil, Ecuador	W25	Clay	(Argentina) Julia Riera	2–6, 5–7
Loss	6–6	Feb 2024	ITF Hammamet, Tunisia	W35	Clay	(Croatia) Lucija Ćirić Bagarić	1–2 ret.
Win	7–6	May 2024	Grado Tennis Cup, Italy	W75	Clay	(Liechtenstein) Kathinka von Deichmann	6–1, 7–5
Win	8–6	Mar 2025	Vacaria Open, Brazil	W75	Clay	(France) Léolia Jeanjean	1–6, 6–4, 6–1
Win	9–6	May 2025	Prague Open, Czechia	W75	Clay	(Japan) Ena Shibahara	6–3, 6–4

=== Doubles: 1 (runner-up) ===
Legend W10 tournaments (0–1)	Finals by surface Clay (0–1)

Result	Date	Tournament	Tier	Surface	Partner	Opponents	Score
Loss	May 2016	ITF Hammamet, Tunisia	W10	Clay	(France) Emmanuelle Girard	(Serbia) Natalija Kostić (Ukraine) Ganna Poznikhirenko	4–6, 4–6

== WTA Tour career earnings ==
Current as of 27 July 2026.

Year	Grand Slam singles titles	WTA singles titles	Total singles titles	Earnings ($)	Money list rank
2017	0	0	0	4,446	892
2018	0	0	0	19,178	401
2019	0	0	0	23,398	381
2020	0	0	0	42,366	Not available
2021	0	0	0	220,289	164
2022	0	0	0	21,584	454
2023	0	0	0	40,786	363
2024	0	0	0	193,451	207
2025	0	0	0	424,804	131
2026	0	0	0	488,366	104
Career	0	0	0	1,500,933	457

* The career total also includes prize money earned before 2017.
