= 2018 Grand Est Open 88 – Doubles =

Doubles
- 2018 Grand Est Open 88

Final
- Champions: (Belgium) An-Sophie Mestach (China) Zheng Saisai
- Runners-up: (India) Prarthana Thombare (Netherlands) Eva Wacanno
- Score: 3–6, 6–2, [10–7]

Events
Singles	Doubles
← 2017 ·	Grand Est Open 88	· 2019 →

Anastasiya Komardina and Elitsa Kostova were the defending champions, but both players chose not to participate.

An-Sophie Mestach and Zheng Saisai won the title after defeating Prarthana Thombare and Eva Wacanno 3–6, 6–2, [10–7] in the final.

== Seeds ==
1. (Chile) Alexa Guarachi / (Czech Republic) Renata Voráčová (quarterfinals)
2. (Belgium) Ysaline Bonaventure / (Georgia (country)) Oksana Kalashnikova (semifinals)
3. (India) Prarthana Thombare / (Netherlands) Eva Wacanno (final)
4. (Netherlands) Arantxa Rus / (Mexico) Renata Zarazúa (quarterfinals)

== Draw ==
=== Key ===
- Q = Qualifier
- WC = Wild card
- LL = Lucky loser
- Alt = Alternate
- SE = Special exempt
- PR = Protected ranking
- ITF = ITF entry
- JE = Junior exempt
- w/o = Walkover
- r = Retired
- d = Defaulted
- SR = Special ranking

=== Draw ===
First round
(Belgium) A-S Mestach (China) S Zheng	6^{2}	0
(Italy) D Chiesa (Spain) S Sorribes Tormo	7^{7}	0^{r}
4	(Netherlands) A Rus (Mexico) R Zarazúa	6	7^{7}
(France) M Georges (France) A Hesse	3	6^{5}
(France) M Partaud (Czech Republic) L Pulchartová	4	3
(Japan) M Kobori (Japan) A Shimizu	6	6
(Poland) E Duda (Spain) A Redondo Gutiérrez	0	2
(France) AM Jovanovic (France) C Sibille	6	6
(France) S Muntean (France) V Muntean	4	2
3	(India) P Thombare (Netherlands) E Wacanno	6	6
(France) T Andrianjafitrimo (France) H Tan	1	2
(Slovakia) M Hončová (Ukraine) A Vasylyeva	6	6
(France) M Arcangioli (France) S Cakarevic	4	1
2	(Belgium) Y Bonaventure (Georgia (country)) O Kalashnikova	6	6

Quarterfinals
1	(Chile) A Guarachi (Czech Republic) R Voráčová	0	1
(Belgium) A-S Mestach (China) S Zheng	6	6
4	(Netherlands) A Rus (Mexico) R Zarazúa	6	4	[11]
(Japan) M Kobori (Japan) A Shimizu	4	6	[13]
(France) AM Jovanovic (France) C Sibille	2	4
3	(India) P Thombare (Netherlands) E Wacanno	6	6
(Slovakia) M Hončová (Ukraine) A Vasylyeva	1	1
2	(Belgium) Y Bonaventure (Georgia (country)) O Kalashnikova	6	6

Semifinals
(Belgium) A-S Mestach (China) S Zheng	6	6
(Japan) M Kobori (Japan) A Shimizu	4	2
3	(India) P Thombare (Netherlands) E Wacanno	6	6
2	(Belgium) Y Bonaventure (Georgia (country)) O Kalashnikova	2	3

Final
(Belgium) A-S Mestach (China) S Zheng	3	6	[10]
3	(India) P Thombare (Netherlands) E Wacanno	6	2	[7]
