= 2017 Grand Est Open 88 =

- Date: 10–16 July
- Edition: 11th
- Category: ITF Women's Circuit
- Prize money: $100,000
- Surface: Clay
- Location: Contrexéville, France

Champions

Singles
- (Sweden) Johanna Larsson

Doubles
- (Russia) Anastasiya Komardina / (Bulgaria) Elitsa Kostova
← 2016 ·	Grand Est Open 88	· 2018 →

The 2017 Grand Est Open 88 was a professional tennis tournament played on outdoor clay courts. It was the eleventh edition of the tournament and was part of the 2017 ITF Women's Circuit. It took place in Contrexéville, France, on 10–16 July 2017.

== Singles main draw entrants ==
=== Seeds ===
Country	Player	Rank^{1}	Seed
SWE	Johanna Larsson	53	1
GER	Tatjana Maria	74	2
RUS	Evgeniya Rodina	80	3
FRA	Pauline Parmentier	83	4
ESP	Sara Sorribes Tormo	100	5
TUN	Ons Jabeur	106	6
TPE	Hsieh Su-wei	113	7
GER	Tamara Korpatsch	126	8

- ^{1} Rankings as of 3 July 2017.

=== Other entrants ===
The following players received a wildcard into the singles main draw:

- (Romania) Alexandra Dulgheru
- (France) Marine Partaud
- (France) Virginie Razzano
- (France) Harmony Tan

The following players received entry from the qualifying draw:

- (Slovakia) Michaela Hončová
- (France) Elixane Lechemia
- (France) Irina Ramialison
- (Italy) Gaia Sanesi

== Champions ==
=== Singles ===
- (Sweden) Johanna Larsson def. (Germany) Tatjana Maria, 6–1, 6–4

=== Doubles ===
- (Russia) Anastasiya Komardina / (Bulgaria) Elitsa Kostova def. (France) Manon Arcangioli / (France) Sara Cakarevic, 6–3, 6–4
