= 2019 Grand Est Open 88 – Doubles =

Doubles
- 2019 Grand Est Open 88

Final
- Champions: (Spain) Georgina García Pérez (Georgia (country)) Oksana Kalashnikova
- Runners-up: (Kazakhstan) Anna Danilina (Netherlands) Eva Wacanno
- Score: 6–3, 6–3

Events
Singles	Doubles
← 2018 ·	Grand Est Open 88	· 2021 →

An-Sophie Mestach and Zheng Saisai were the defending champions, however Mestach had retired from professional tennis earlier in the year and Zheng chose not to participate.

Georgina García Pérez and Oksana Kalashnikova won the title, defeating Anna Danilina and Eva Wacanno in the final, 6–3, 6–3.

== Seeds ==
1. (Spain) Georgina García Pérez / (Georgia (country)) Oksana Kalashnikova (champions)
2. (Kazakhstan) Anna Danilina / (Netherlands) Eva Wacanno (final)
3. (Georgia (country)) Sofia Shapatava / (United Kingdom) Emily Webley-Smith (semifinals)
4. (Norway) Ulrikke Eikeri / (Netherlands) Quirine Lemoine (semifinals)

== Draw ==
=== Key ===
- Q = Qualifier
- WC = Wild card
- LL = Lucky loser
- Alt = Alternate
- SE = Special exempt
- PR = Protected ranking
- ITF = ITF entry
- JE = Junior exempt
- w/o = Walkover
- r = Retired
- d = Defaulted
- SR = Special ranking

=== Draw ===
First round
(Germany) T Korpatsch (Latvia) D Marcinkēviča	6	5	[10]
(Uzbekistan) N Abduraimova (India) P Thombare	2	7	[5]
(Chile) B Gatica (Brazil) R Pereira	3	4
(Russia) S Lansere (Russia) K Rakhimova	6	6
(France) S Cakarevic (Colombia) M Herazo González	1	6	[11]
(France) M Arcangioli (France) M Yerolymos	6	4	[9]
(Slovakia) M Hončová (Slovakia) V Juhászová	3	2
4	(Norway) U Eikeri (Netherlands) Q Lemoine	6	6
(France) AM Jovanovic (France) C Sibille	4	4
(France) L Bencheikh (France) M Rouvroy	6	6

Quarterfinals
1	(Spain) G García Pérez (Georgia (country)) O Kalashnikova	6	6
(Germany) T Korpatsch (Latvia) D Marcinkēviča	0	2
3	(Georgia (country)) S Shapatava (United Kingdom) E Webley-Smith	4	6	[10]
(Russia) S Lansere (Russia) K Rakhimova	6	4	[5]
(France) S Cakarevic (Colombia) M Herazo González	1	4
4	(Norway) U Eikeri (Netherlands) Q Lemoine	6	6
(France) L Bencheikh (France) M Rouvroy	2	3
2	(Kazakhstan) A Danilina (Netherlands) E Wacanno	6	6

Semifinals
1	(Spain) G García Pérez (Georgia (country)) O Kalashnikova	6	6
3	(Georgia (country)) S Shapatava (United Kingdom) E Webley-Smith	3	4
4	(Norway) U Eikeri (Netherlands) Q Lemoine	4	3
2	(Kazakhstan) A Danilina (Netherlands) E Wacanno	6	6

Final
1	(Spain) G García Pérez (Georgia (country)) O Kalashnikova	6	6
2	(Kazakhstan) A Danilina (Netherlands) E Wacanno	3	3
