= 2016 Lorraine Open 88 – Doubles =

Doubles
- 2016 Lorraine Open 88

Final
- Champions: (Netherlands) Cindy Burger (Spain) Laura Pous Tió
- Runners-up: (United States) Nicole Melichar (Czech Republic) Renata Voráčová
- Score: 6–1, 6–3

Events
Singles	Doubles
← 2015 ·	Lorraine Open 88	· 2017 →

Oksana Kalashnikova and Danka Kovinić were the defending champions, but both players chose not to participate.

Cindy Burger and Laura Pous Tió won the title, defeating Nicole Melichar and Renata Voráčová in the final, 6–1, 6–3.

== Seeds ==
1. (United States) Nicole Melichar / (Czech Republic) Renata Voráčová (final)
2. (Netherlands) Cindy Burger / (Spain) Laura Pous Tió (champions)
3. (Brazil) Laura Pigossi / (Spain) Sílvia Soler Espinosa (first round)
4. (Japan) Misa Eguchi / (Russia) Evgeniya Rodina (semifinals)

== Draw ==
=== Key ===
- Q = Qualifier
- WC = Wild card
- LL = Lucky loser
- Alt = Alternate
- SE = Special exempt
- PR = Protected ranking
- ITF = ITF entry
- JE = Junior exempt
- w/o = Walkover
- r = Retired
- d = Defaulted
- SR = Special ranking

First round
1	(United States) N Melichar (Czech Republic) R Voráčová	7	6
(Netherlands) C Ewijk (Netherlands) R van der Hoek	5	3
(France) E Lechemia (Turkey) D Yurtkuran	2	2
(France) M Arcangioli (France) C Paquet	6	6
3	(Brazil) L Pigossi (Spain) S Soler Espinosa	2	7^{7}	[4]
(Argentina) T Búa (Ukraine) A Fomina	6	6^{4}	[10]
(France) M Georges (France) H Tan	5	0
(Slovakia) M Hončová (France) S Reix	7	6
(Russia) M Marfutina (Bosnia and Herzegovina) J Simić	3	3
(Latvia) D Marcinkēviča (Netherlands) E Wacanno	6	6
(France) V Muntean (Russia) N Vikhlyantseva	0	2
4	(Japan) M Eguchi (Russia) E Rodina	6	6
(France) F Ferro (France) M Yerolymos	6	6
(Germany) T Korpatsch (Australia) K Wlodarczak	4	4
(France) I Ramialison (France) C Sibille	2	1
2	(Netherlands) C Burger (Spain) L Pous Tió	6	6

Quarterfinals
1	(United States) N Melichar (Czech Republic) R Voráčová	6	6
(France) M Arcangioli (France) C Paquet	2	3
(Argentina) T Búa (Ukraine) A Fomina	6	6^{5}	[6]
(Slovakia) M Hončová (France) S Reix	4	7^{7}	[10]
(Latvia) D Marcinkēviča (Netherlands) E Wacanno	6	1	[7]
4	(Japan) M Eguchi (Russia) E Rodina	3	6	[10]
(France) F Ferro (France) M Yerolymos	4	3
2	(Netherlands) C Burger (Spain) L Pous Tió	6	6

Semifinals
1	(United States) N Melichar (Czech Republic) R Voráčová	6	3	[10]
(Slovakia) M Hončová (France) S Reix	4	6	[8]
4	(Japan) M Eguchi (Russia) E Rodina	2	2
2	(Netherlands) C Burger (Spain) L Pous Tió	6	6

Final
1	(United States) N Melichar (Czech Republic) R Voráčová	1	3
2	(Netherlands) C Burger (Spain) L Pous Tió	6	6
