= 2019 Grand Est Open 88 =

- Date: 8–14 July 2019
- Edition: 13th
- Category: ITF Women's World Tennis Tour
- Prize money: $100,000
- Surface: Clay
- Location: Contrexéville, France

Champions

Singles
- (Ukraine) Katarina Zavatska

Doubles
- (Spain) Georgina García Pérez / (Georgia (country)) Oksana Kalashnikova
← 2018 ·	Grand Est Open 88	· 2021 →

The 2019 Grand Est Open 88 was a professional tennis tournament played on outdoor clay courts. It was the thirteenth edition of the tournament which was part of the 2019 ITF Women's World Tennis Tour. It took place in Contrexéville, France between 8 and 14 July 2019.

== Singles main-draw entrants ==
=== Seeds ===
Country	Player	Rank^{1}	Seed
SUI	Timea Bacsinszky	91	1
SUI	Stefanie Vögele	97	2
LUX	Mandy Minella	98	3
USA	Varvara Lepchenko	124	4
~~SLO~~	~~Kaja Juvan~~	~~133~~	~~5~~
GER	Tamara Korpatsch	145	6
ITA	Jasmine Paolini	147	7
FRA	Chloé Paquet	155	8

- ^{1} Rankings are as of 1 July 2019.

=== Other entrants ===
The following players received wildcards into the singles main draw:

- (France) Tessah Andrianjafitrimo
- (Switzerland) Timea Bacsinszky
- (France) Alice Ramé
- (France) Margot Yerolymos

The following players received entry from the qualifying draw:

- (Uzbekistan) Nigina Abduraimova
- (France) Sara Cakarevic
- (Croatia) Jana Fett
- (Colombia) María Herazo González
- (Slovakia) Vivien Juhászová
- (Georgia (country)) Sofia Shapatava

The following player received entry as a lucky loser:

- (Germany) Caroline Werner

== Champions ==
=== Singles ===
- (Ukraine) Katarina Zavatska def. (Norway) Ulrikke Eikeri, 6–4, 6–4

=== Doubles ===
- (Spain) Georgina García Pérez / (Georgia (country)) Oksana Kalashnikova def. (Kazakhstan) Anna Danilina / (Netherlands) Eva Wacanno, 6–3, 6–3
