= 2018 Grand Est Open 88 =

- Date: 9–15 July
- Edition: 12th
- Category: ITF Women's Circuit
- Prize money: $100,000
- Surface: Clay
- Location: Contrexéville, France

Champions

Singles
- (Switzerland) Stefanie Vögele

Doubles
- (Belgium) An-Sophie Mestach / (China) Zheng Saisai
← 2017 ·	Grand Est Open 88	· 2019 →

The 2018 Grand Est Open 88 was a professional tennis tournament played on outdoor clay courts. It was the twelfth edition of the tournament and was part of the 2018 ITF Women's Circuit. It took place in Contrexéville, France, on 9–15 July 2018.

== Singles main draw entrants ==
=== Seeds ===
Country	Player	Rank^{1}	Seed
FRA	Pauline Parmentier	63	1
UKR	Kateryna Kozlova	67	2
SUI	Stefanie Vögele	93	3
SUI	Viktorija Golubic	99	4
ESP	Sara Sorribes Tormo	102	5
NED	Arantxa Rus	105	6
BEL	Ysaline Bonaventure	116	7
GER	Mona Barthel	118	8

- ^{1} Rankings as of 2 July 2018.

=== Other entrants ===
The following players received a wildcard into the singles main draw:

- (France) Tessah Andrianjafitrimo
- (France) Sara Cakarevic
- (France) Amandine Hesse
- (United States) Claire Liu

The following players received entry from the qualifying draw:

- (Luxembourg) Mandy Minella
- (France) Mallaurie Noël
- (Ukraine) Anastasiya Vasylyeva
- (France) Lucie Wargnier

== Champions ==
=== Singles ===
- (Switzerland) Stefanie Vögele def. (Spain) Sara Sorribes Tormo, 6–4, 6–2

=== Doubles ===
- (Belgium) An-Sophie Mestach / (China) Zheng Saisai def. (India) Prarthana Thombare / (Netherlands) Eva Wacanno, 3–6, 6–2, [10–7]
