= 2017 Grand Est Open 88 – Doubles =

Doubles
- 2017 Grand Est Open 88

Final
- Champion: (Russia) Anastasiya Komardina (Bulgaria) Elitsa Kostova
- Runner-up: (France) Manon Arcangioli (France) Sara Cakarevic
- Score: 6–3, 6–4

Events
| Singles | Doubles |
| ← 2016 · | Grand Est Open 88 | · 2018 → |

Cindy Burger and Laura Pous Tió were the defending champions, but both players chose not to participate.

Anastasiya Komardina and Elitsa Kostova won the title, defeating Manon Arcangioli and Sara Cakarevic in the final, 6–3, 6–4.

== Seeds ==
1. (Japan) Kotomi Takahata / (India) Prarthana Thombare (quarterfinals)
2. (Romania) Irina Bara / (Ukraine) Alona Fomina (quarterfinals)
3. (Spain) Sílvia Soler Espinosa / (Spain) Sara Sorribes Tormo (first round)
4. (Netherlands) Quirine Lemoine / (Netherlands) Eva Wacanno (first round)

== Draw ==
=== Key ===
- Q = Qualifier
- WC = Wild card
- LL = Lucky loser
- Alt = Alternate
- SE = Special exempt
- PR = Protected ranking
- ITF = ITF entry
- JE = Junior exempt
- w/o = Walkover
- r = Retired
- d = Defaulted
- SR = Special ranking

First round
(Mexico) V Rodríguez (Ukraine) A Vasylyeva | 6 | 6
(France) A Hesse (Belarus) L Marozava | 2 | 4
3 | (Spain) S Soler Espinosa (Spain) S Sorribes Tormo | 5 | 3
(Russia) A Komardina (Bulgaria) E Kostova | 7 | 6
(France) M Georges (France) V Muntean
WC | (France) I Ramialison (France) C Sibille | w/o
(France) M Arcangioli (France) S Cakarevic | w/o
(Georgia (country)) O Kalashnikova (Ukraine) A Kalinina
(United States) L Chirico (Italy) G Sanesi | 6 | 5 | [10]
4 | (Netherlands) Q Lemoine (Netherlands) E Wacanno | 4 | 7 | [7]
(France) E Lechemia (France) H Tan | 4 | 6 | [6]
(Slovakia) M Hončová (Russia) A Kalinskaya | 6 | 2 | [10]

Quarterfinals
1 | (Japan) K Takahata (India) P Thombare | 4 | 2
(Mexico) V Rodríguez (Ukraine) A Vasylyeva | 6 | 6
(Russia) A Komardina (Bulgaria) E Kostova | 6 | 6
WC | (France) I Ramialison (France) C Sibille | 4 | 2
(France) M Arcangioli (France) S Cakarevic | 6^{3} | 7 | [12]
(United States) L Chirico (Italy) G Sanesi | 7^{7} | 5 | [10]
(Slovakia) M Hončová (Russia) A Kalinskaya | 6 | 7^{7}
2 | (Romania) I Bara (Ukraine) A Fomina | 2 | 6^{5}

Semifinals
(Mexico) V Rodríguez (Ukraine) A Vasylyeva | 1 | 4
(Russia) A Komardina (Bulgaria) E Kostova | 6 | 6
(France) M Arcangioli (France) S Cakarevic | w/o
(Slovakia) M Hončová (Russia) A Kalinskaya

Final
(Russia) A Komardina (Bulgaria) E Kostova | 6 | 6
(France) M Arcangioli (France) S Cakarevic | 3 | 4
