= 2016 Lorraine Open 88 =

- Date: 4–10 July
- Edition: 10th
- Category: ITF Women's Circuit
- Prize money: $100,000
- Surface: Clay
- Location: Contrexéville, France

Champions

Singles
- (France) Pauline Parmentier

Doubles
- (Netherlands) Cindy Burger / (Spain) Laura Pous Tió
← 2015 ·	Lorraine Open 88	· 2017 →

The 2016 Lorraine Open 88 was a professional tennis tournament played on outdoor clay courts. It was the tenth edition of the tournament and part of the 2016 ITF Women's Circuit, offering a total of $100,000 in prize money. It took place in Contrexéville, France, on 4–10 July 2016.

== Singles main draw entrants ==
=== Seeds ===
Country	Player	Rank^{1}	Seed
BRA	Teliana Pereira	88	1
FRA	Pauline Parmentier	89	2
SUI	Stefanie Vögele	101	3
RUS	Evgeniya Rodina	102	4
GRE	Maria Sakkari	115	5
LUX	Mandy Minella	126	6
ESP	Sílvia Soler Espinosa	137	7
BEL	Ysaline Bonaventure	143	8

- ^{1} Rankings as of 27 June 2016.

=== Other entrants ===
The following player received a wildcard into the singles main draw:

- (France) Victoria Muntean
- (France) Chloé Paquet
- (France) Harmony Tan
- (France) Margot Yerolymos

The following players received entry from the qualifying draw:

- (France) Audrey Albié
- (France) Alice Bacquié
- (Serbia) Doroteja Erić
- (Latvia) Diāna Marcinkēviča

The following player received entry by a protected ranking:

- (France) Claire Feuerstein

== Champions ==
=== Singles ===
- (France) Pauline Parmentier def. (France) Océane Dodin, 6–1, 6–1

=== Doubles ===
- (Netherlands) Cindy Burger / (Spain) Laura Pous Tió def. (United States) Nicole Melichar / (Czech Republic) Renata Voráčová, 6–1, 6–3
