= 2018 Grand Est Open 88 – Singles =

Singles
- 2018 Grand Est Open 88

Final
- Champion: (Switzerland) Stefanie Vögele
- Runner-up: (Spain) Sara Sorribes Tormo
- Score: 6–4, 6–2

Events
Singles	Doubles
← 2017 ·	Grand Est Open 88	· 2019 →

Stefanie Vögele won the title, defeating Sara Sorribes Tormo in the final in straight sets: 6–4, 6–2. Johanna Larsson was the defending champion, but chose not to participate.

== Seeds ==
1. (France) Pauline Parmentier (first round)
2. (Ukraine) Kateryna Kozlova (second round)
3. (Switzerland) Stefanie Vögele (champion)
4. (Switzerland) Viktorija Golubic (first round)
5. (Spain) Sara Sorribes Tormo (final)
6. (Netherlands) Arantxa Rus (quarterfinals)
7. (Belgium) Ysaline Bonaventure (quarterfinals)
8. (Germany) Mona Barthel (quarterfinals)

== Draw ==
=== Key ===
- Q = Qualifier
- WC = Wild card
- LL = Lucky loser
- Alt = Alternate
- SE = Special exempt
- PR = Protected ranking
- ITF = ITF entry
- JE = Junior exempt
- w/o = Walkover
- r = Retired
- d = Defaulted
- SR = Special ranking

=== Finals ===
Semifinals
(China) Zheng Saisai	3	6	2
3	(Switzerland) Stefanie Vögele	6	3	6
5	(Spain) Sara Sorribes Tormo	6	6
(Russia) Anna Kalinskaya	4	4

Final
3	(Switzerland) Stefanie Vögele	6	6
5	(Spain) Sara Sorribes Tormo	4	2

=== Top half ===
First round
1	(France) P Parmentier	6^{8}	6	2
(China) S Zheng	7^{10}	3	6
Q	(France) L Wargnier	2	6	3
WC	(France) T Andrianjafitrimo	6	4	6
(France) H Tan	3	3
(Italy) J Paolini	6	6
Q	(Ukraine) A Vasylyeva	0	0
6	(Netherlands) A Rus	6	6
3	(Switzerland) S Vögele	6	7^{7}
(Mexico) R Zarazúa	3	6^{5}
(Switzerland) C Perrin	6	6
Q	(France) M Noël	0	2
(France) O Dodin	3	0^{r}
WC	(France) A Hesse	6	0
(Italy) D Chiesa	3	1
8	(Germany) M Barthel	6	6

Second round
(China) S Zheng	6	6
WC	(France) T Andrianjafitrimo	0	4
(Italy) J Paolini	4	3
6	(Netherlands) A Rus	6	6
3	(Switzerland) S Vögele	7	6
(Switzerland) C Perrin	5	2
WC	(France) A Hesse	5	4
8	(Germany) M Barthel	7	6

Quarterfinals
(China) S Zheng	6	4	6
6	(Netherlands) A Rus	3	6	4
3	(Switzerland) S Vögele	7^{7}	6
8	(Germany) M Barthel	6^{2}	2

Semifinals
(China) S Zheng	3	6	2
3	(Switzerland) S Vögele	6	3	6

=== Bottom half ===
First round
5	(Spain) S Sorribes Tormo	6	6^{5}	6
Q	(Luxembourg) M Minella	4	7^{7}	3
(Slovakia) M Hončová	3	6	3
(France) M Georges	6	1	6
(Canada) E Bouchard	2	6	3
(Spain) P Badosa Gibert	6	3	6
(Switzerland) P Schnyder	7^{7}	1	6
4	(Switzerland) V Golubic	6^{5}	6	3
7	(Belgium) Y Bonaventure	6	7^{7}
(Japan) M Kobori	3	6^{2}
(Japan) A Shimizu	4	4
WC	(United States) C Liu	6	6
WC	(France) S Cakarevic	3	1
(Russia) A Kalinskaya	6	6
(Germany) T Korpatsch	3	4
2	(Ukraine) K Kozlova	6	6

Second round
5	(Spain) S Sorribes Tormo	7	6
(France) M Georges	5	1
(Spain) P Badosa Gibert	6^{1}	1
(Switzerland) P Schnyder	7^{7}	6
7	(Belgium) Y Bonaventure	6^{5}	6	6
WC	(United States) C Liu	7^{7}	3	1
(Russia) A Kalinskaya	6	7^{7}
2	(Ukraine) K Kozlova	4	6^{5}

Quarterfinals
5	(Spain) S Sorribes Tormo	6	6
(Switzerland) P Schnyder	2	2
7	(Belgium) Y Bonaventure	6	1	4
(Russia) A Kalinskaya	3	6	6

Semifinals
5	(Spain) S Sorribes Tormo	6	6
(Russia) A Kalinskaya	4	4
