= 2017 Grand Est Open 88 – Singles =

Singles
- 2017 Grand Est Open 88

Final
- Champion: (Sweden) Johanna Larsson
- Runner-up: (Germany) Tatjana Maria
- Score: 6–1, 6–4

Events
Singles	Doubles
← 2016 ·	Grand Est Open 88	· 2018 →

Pauline Parmentier was the defending champion, but lost in the semifinals to Tatjana Maria.

Johanna Larsson won the title, defeating Maria in the final, 6–1, 6–4.

== Seeds ==
1. (Sweden) Johanna Larsson (champion)
2. (Germany) Tatjana Maria (final)
3. (Russia) Evgeniya Rodina (semifinals)
4. (France) Pauline Parmentier (semifinals)
5. (Spain) Sara Sorribes Tormo (quarterfinals)
6. (Tunisia) Ons Jabeur (first round)
7. (Chinese Taipei) Hsieh Su-wei (second round)
8. (Germany) Tamara Korpatsch (quarterfinals)

== Draw ==
=== Key ===
- Q = Qualifier
- WC = Wild card
- LL = Lucky loser
- Alt = Alternate
- SE = Special exempt
- PR = Protected ranking
- ITF = ITF entry
- JE = Junior exempt
- w/o = Walkover
- r = Retired
- d = Defaulted
- SR = Special ranking

=== Finals ===
Semifinals
1	(Sweden) Johanna Larsson	6	6
3	(Russia) Evgeniya Rodina	2	1
4	(France) Pauline Parmentier	4	2
2	(Germany) Tatjana Maria	6	6

Final
1	(Sweden) Johanna Larsson	6	6
2	(Germany) Tatjana Maria	1	4

=== Top half ===
First round
1	(Sweden) J Larsson	6	6
(United States) L Chirico	1	4
(Netherlands) Q Lemoine	7^{7}	7
Q	(Italy) G Sanesi	6^{2}	5
(Romania) I Bara	6	6
(Bulgaria) E Kostova	4	0
(Chile) D Seguel	0	6^{2}
7	(Chinese Taipei) S-w Hsieh	6	7^{7}
3	(Russia) E Rodina	6	0
WC	(France) V Razzano	1	0^{r}
(Spain) S Soler Espinosa	4	2
(Russia) A Kalinskaya	6	6
(Ukraine) A Kalinina	3	3
WC	(Romania) A Dulgheru	6	6
(Russia) A Komardina	6	6
6	(Tunisia) O Jabeur	4	3

Second round
1	(Sweden) J Larsson	6	6
(Netherlands) Q Lemoine	4	3
(Romania) I Bara	3	6	6
7	(Chinese Taipei) S-w Hsieh	6	1	4
3	(Russia) E Rodina	6	7^{7}
(Russia) A Kalinskaya	3	6^{3}
WC	(Romania) A Dulgheru	6	6
(Russia) A Komardina	3	2

Quarterfinals
1	(Sweden) J Larsson	7	7^{7}
(Romania) I Bara	5	6^{5}
3	(Russia) E Rodina	7	3	7^{7}
WC	(Romania) A Dulgheru	5	6	6^{5}

Semifinals
1	(Sweden) J Larsson	6	6
3	(Russia) E Rodina	2	1

=== Bottom half ===
First round
5	(Spain) S Sorribes Tormo	6^{3}	6	6
Q	(Slovakia) M Hončová	7^{7}	2	3
(Switzerland) J Teichmann	6	6
(France) C Paquet	4	4
Q	(France) I Ramialison	2	1
(France) A Hesse	6	6
WC	(France) M Partaud	2	5
4	(France) P Parmentier	6	7
8	(Germany) T Korpatsch	6	6
(France) T Andrianjafitrimo	3	4
WC	(France) H Tan	6	6
Q	(France) E Lechemia	4	3
(Spain) P Badosa Gibert	6	6
(France) M Georges	2	4
(Mexico) V Rodríguez	2	2
2	(Germany) T Maria	6	6

Second round
5	(Spain) S Sorribes Tormo	2	6	3
(Switzerland) J Teichmann	6	3	2^{r}
(France) A Hesse	4	2
4	(France) P Parmentier	6	6
8	(Germany) T Korpatsch	6	6
WC	(France) H Tan	2	3
(Spain) P Badosa Gibert	3	6	3
2	(Germany) T Maria	6	1	6

Quarterfinals
5	(Spain) S Sorribes Tormo	1	6	4
4	(France) P Parmentier	6	3	6
8	(Germany) T Korpatsch	1	3
2	(Germany) T Maria	6	6

Semifinals
4	(France) P Parmentier	4	2
2	(Germany) T Maria	6	6
