= 2019 Grand Est Open 88 – Singles =

Singles
- 2019 Grand Est Open 88

Final
- Champion: (Ukraine) Katarina Zavatska
- Runner-up: (Norway) Ulrikke Eikeri
- Score: 6–4, 6–4

Events
| Singles | Doubles |
| ← 2018 · | Grand Est Open 88 | · 2021 → |

Stefanie Vögele was the defending champion, but lost in the semifinals to Katarina Zavatska.

Zavatska went on to win the title, defeating Ulrikke Eikeri in the final, 6–4, 6–4.

== Seeds ==
1. (Switzerland) Timea Bacsinszky (first round)
2. (Switzerland) Stefanie Vögele (semifinals)
3. (Luxembourg) Mandy Minella (second round)
4. (United States) Varvara Lepchenko (second round)
5. (Slovenia) Kaja Juvan (withdrew)
6. (Germany) Tamara Korpatsch (first round)
7. (Italy) Jasmine Paolini (first round)
8. (France) Chloé Paquet (second round)

== Draw ==
=== Key ===
- Q = Qualifier
- WC = Wild card
- LL = Lucky loser
- Alt = Alternate
- SE = Special exempt
- PR = Protected ranking
- ITF = ITF entry
- JE = Junior exempt
- w/o = Walkover
- r = Retired
- d = Defaulted
- SR = Special ranking

=== Finals ===
Semifinals
(Italy) Martina Trevisan | 4 | 6 | 4
(Norway) Ulrikke Eikeri | 6 | 1 | 6
(Ukraine) Katarina Zavatska | 4 | 6 | 6
2 | (Switzerland) Stefanie Vögele | 6 | 3 | 3

Final
(Norway) Ulrikke Eikeri | 4 | 4
(Ukraine) Katarina Zavatska | 6 | 6

=== Top half ===
First round
1/WC | (Switzerland) T Bacsinszky | 4 | 7^{9} | 2
(Japan) K Nara | 6 | 6^{7} | 6
Q | (Slovakia) V Juhászová | 0 | 2
(Spain) G García Pérez | 6 | 6
(Italy) M Trevisan | 6 | 6^{3} | 6
(Russia) V Gracheva | 3 | 7^{7} | 3
Q | (Croatia) J Fett | 6 | 1 | 6
7 | (Italy) J Paolini | 4 | 6 | 4
4 | (United States) V Lepchenko | 6 | 6^{4} | 6
(Netherlands) Q Lemoine | 2 | 7^{7} | 4
WC | (France) A Ramé | 2 | 1
WC | (France) T Andrianjafitrimo | 6 | 6
Q | (Uzbekistan) N Abduraimova | 3 | 3
(Norway) U Eikeri | 6 | 6
(Chile) D Seguel | 2 | 6 | 6
6 | (Germany) T Korpatsch | 6 | 4 | 2

Second round
(Japan) K Nara | 6 | 4 | 2
(Spain) G García Pérez | 4 | 6 | 6
(Italy) M Trevisan | 6 | 6
Q | (Croatia) J Fett | 3 | 3
4 | (United States) V Lepchenko | 6 | 1 | 0
WC | (France) T Andrianjafitrimo | 1 | 6 | 6
(Norway) U Eikeri | 6 | 5 | 7
(Chile) D Seguel | 3 | 7 | 5

Quarterfinals
(Spain) G García Pérez | 6 | 4 | 6^{6}
(Italy) M Trevisan | 2 | 6 | 7^{8}
WC | (France) T Andrianjafitrimo | 7^{7} | 4 | 5
(Norway) U Eikeri | 6^{4} | 6 | 7

Semifinals
(Italy) M Trevisan | 4 | 6 | 4
(Norway) U Eikeri | 6 | 1 | 6

=== Bottom half ===
First round
8 | (France) C Paquet | 6 | 7^{9}
LL | (Germany) C Werner | 4 | 6^{7}
(Spain) C Bucșa | 6 | 6
(France) A Albié | 4 | 2
(Ukraine) K Zavatska | 7^{7} | 7
(Kazakhstan) A Danilina | 6^{1} | 5
(France) H Tan | 4 | 6 | 1
3 | (Luxembourg) M Minella | 6 | 2 | 6
Q | (Georgia (country)) S Shapatava | 6^{4} | 6^{3}
Q | (France) S Cakarevic | 7^{7} | 7^{7}
(Russia) K Rakhimova | 3 | 7^{7} | 1
Q | (Colombia) M Herazo González | 6 | 6^{5} | 6
(France) A Hesse | 6 | 6
(Latvia) D Marcinkēviča | 3 | 4
WC | (France) M Yerolymos | 3 | 7 | 1
2 | (Switzerland) S Vögele | 6 | 5 | 6

Second round
8 | (France) C Paquet | 6 | 5 | 1
(Spain) C Bucșa | 1 | 7 | 6
(Ukraine) K Zavatska | 6 | 6
3 | (Luxembourg) M Minella | 3 | 1
Q | (France) S Cakarevic | 6 | 6
Q | (Colombia) M Herazo González | 4 | 2
(France) A Hesse | 3 | 7 | 3
2 | (Switzerland) S Vögele | 6 | 5 | 6

Quarterfinals
(Spain) C Bucșa | 4 | 6 | 4
(Ukraine) K Zavatska | 6 | 2 | 6
Q | (France) S Cakarevic | 3 | 2
2 | (Switzerland) S Vögele | 6 | 6

Semifinals
(Ukraine) K Zavatska | 4 | 6 | 6
2 | (Switzerland) S Vögele | 6 | 3 | 3
