= 2016 Lorraine Open 88 – Singles =

Singles
- 2016 Lorraine Open 88

Final
- Champion: (France) Pauline Parmentier
- Runner-up: (France) Océane Dodin
- Score: 6–1, 6–1

Events
| Singles | Doubles |
| ← 2015 · | Lorraine Open 88 | · 2017 → |

Alexandra Dulgheru was the defending champion, but chose not to participate.

Pauline Parmentier won the title, defeating Océane Dodin in an all-French final, 6–1, 6–1.

== Seeds ==
1. (Brazil) Teliana Pereira (second round)
2. (France) Pauline Parmentier (champion)
3. (Switzerland) Stefanie Vögele (first round, retired)
4. (Russia) Evgeniya Rodina (first round)
5. (Greece) Maria Sakkari (quarterfinals)
6. (Luxembourg) Mandy Minella (first round)
7. (Spain) Sílvia Soler Espinosa (second round)
8. (Belgium) Ysaline Bonaventure (first round)

== Main draw ==
=== Key ===
- Q = Qualifier
- WC = Wild card
- LL = Lucky loser
- Alt = Alternate
- SE = Special exempt
- PR = Protected ranking
- ITF = ITF entry
- JE = Junior exempt
- w/o = Walkover
- r = Retired
- d = Defaulted
- SR = Special ranking

=== Finals ===
Semifinals
(France) Océane Dodin | 6 | 7^{7}
(Netherlands) Cindy Burger | 2 | 6^{1}
(France) Amandine Hesse | 2 | 2
2 | (France) Pauline Parmentier | 6 | 6

Final
(France) Océane Dodin | 1 | 1
2 | (France) Pauline Parmentier | 6 | 6

=== Top half ===
First round
1 | (Brazil) T Pereira | 7 | 6
(France) I Ramialison | 5 | 4
(Uzbekistan) A Amanmuradova | 5 | 3
(France) O Dodin | 7 | 6
WC | (France) V Muntean | 2 | 2
Q | (Serbia) D Erić | 6 | 6
(France) M Georges | 4 | 7 | 7^{7}
8 | (Belgium) Y Bonaventure | 6 | 5 | 6^{4}
4 | (Russia) E Rodina | 4 | 4
(Netherlands) C Burger | 6 | 6
(Russia) N Vikhlyantseva | 6 | 3 | 6
(Spain) S Sorribes Tormo | 0 | 6 | 2
Q | (France) A Albié | 4 | 4
(Japan) M Eguchi | 6 | 6
WC | (France) C Paquet | 0 | 3
7 | (Spain) S Soler Espinosa | 6 | 6

Second round
1 | (Brazil) T Pereira | 7 | 2 | 6^{4}
(France) O Dodin | 5 | 6 | 7^{7}
Q | (Serbia) D Erić | 0 | 1
(France) M Georges | 6 | 6
(Netherlands) C Burger | 6 | 7
(Russia) N Vikhlyantseva | 4 | 5
(Japan) M Eguchi | 7^{8} | 6
7 | (Spain) S Soler Espinosa | 6^{6} | 2

Quarterfinals
(France) O Dodin | 3 | 6 | 6
(France) M Georges | 6 | 4 | 2
(Netherlands) C Burger | 6 | 7^{7}
(Japan) M Eguchi | 3 | 6^{4}

Semifinals
(France) O Dodin | 6 | 7^{7}
(Netherlands) C Burger | 2 | 6^{1}

=== Bottom half ===
First round
6 | (Luxembourg) M Minella | 5 | 2
(Germany) T Korpatsch | 7 | 6
(Chile) D Seguel | 6 | 6
(France) V Razzano | 3 | 1
WC | (France) H Tan | 2 | 1
(France) A Hesse | 6 | 6
(Spain) L Pous Tió | 6 | 0
3 | (Switzerland) S Vögele | 4 | 0^{r}
5 | (Greece) M Sakkari | 6 | 6
Q | (Latvia) D Marcinkēviča | 1 | 2
WC | (France) M Yerolymos | 6 | 6^{5} | 0
Q | (France) A Bacquié | 4 | 7^{7} | 6
(France) S Reix | 6 | 6
PR | (France) C Feuerstein | 1 | 2
(France) F Ferro | 5 | 2
2 | (France) P Parmentier | 7 | 6

Second round
(Germany) T Korpatsch | 6 | 6
(Chile) D Seguel | 3 | 2
(France) A Hesse | 6 | 6
(Spain) L Pous Tió | 4 | 4
5 | (Greece) M Sakkari | 6 | 6
Q | (France) A Bacquié | 1 | 3
(France) S Reix | 3 | 2
2 | (France) P Parmentier | 6 | 6

Quarterfinals
(Germany) T Korpatsch | 3 | 0
(France) A Hesse | 6 | 6
5 | (Greece) M Sakkari | 4 | 1
2 | (France) P Parmentier | 6 | 6

Semifinals
(France) A Hesse | 2 | 2
2 | (France) P Parmentier | 6 | 6
