= Océane Dodin =

French tennis player (born 1996)

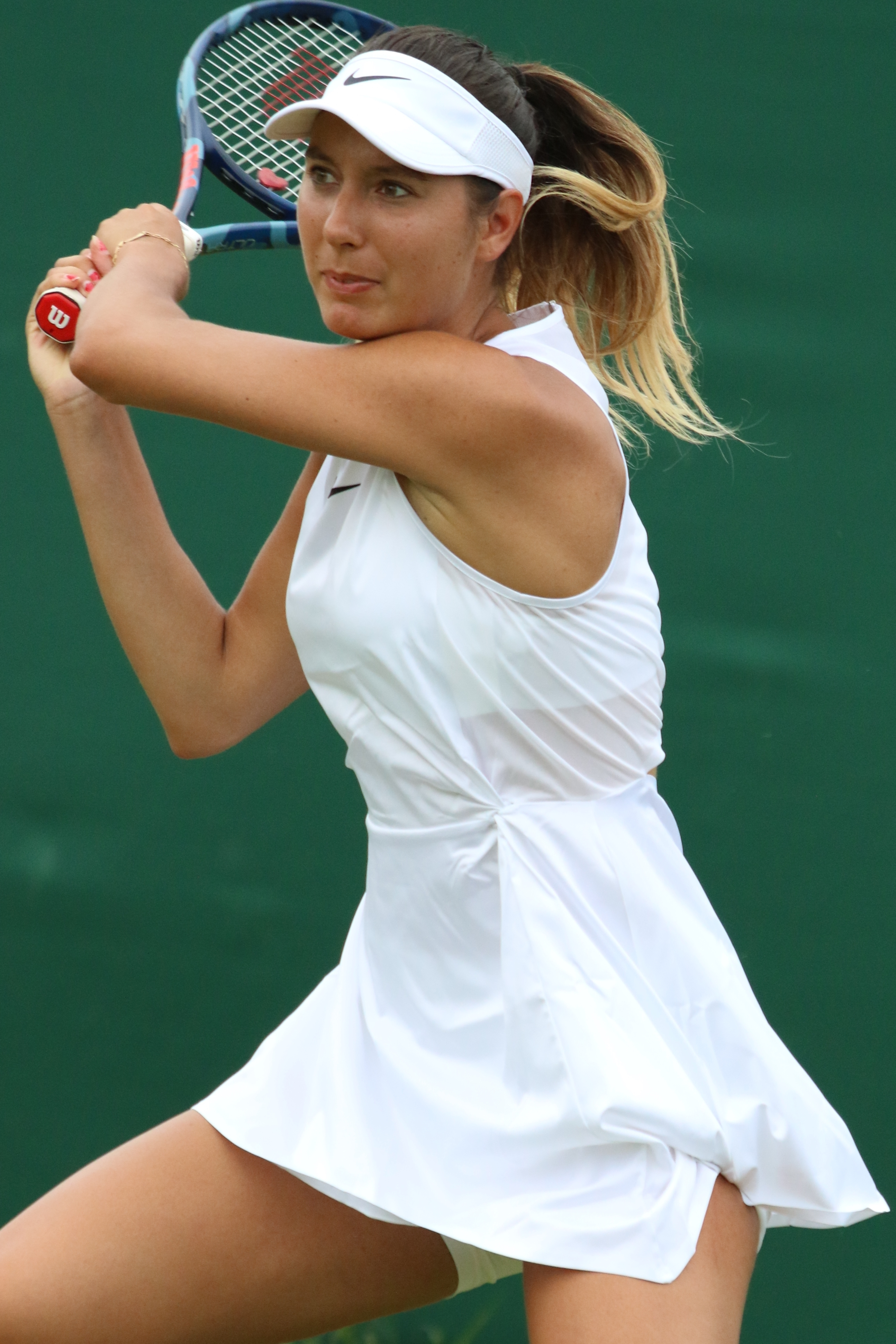
- Dodin at the 2019 Wimbledon qualifying
- Country (sports): France
- Residence: Villeneuve-d'Ascq, France
- Born: 24 October 1996 (age 30) Lille, France
- Height: 1.83 m (6 ft 0 in)
- Turned pro: 2011
- Plays: Right (two-handed backhand)
- Coach: Thomas Drouet
- Prize money: $2,986,869

Singles
- Career record: 459–299
- Career titles: 1 WTA, 17 ITF
- Highest ranking: No. 46 (12 June 2017)
- Current ranking: No. 331 (27 July 2026)

Grand Slam singles results
- Australian Open: 4R (2024)
- French Open: 2R (2017, 2023)
- Wimbledon: 1R (2017, 2022, 2024)
- US Open: 2R (2015, 2017)

Doubles
- Career record: 3–6
- Career titles: 0
- Highest ranking: No. 375 (23 October 2017)

Grand Slam doubles results
- French Open: 1R (2021, 2022)
- Wimbledon: 2R (2017)
- US Open: 1R (2017)

Grand Slam mixed doubles results
- French Open: 1R (2022)
- Last updated on: 31 July 2026.

Océane Dodin (French pronunciation: [ɔsean dɔdɛ̃], born 24 October 1996) is a French professional tennis player. She reached a career-high singles ranking of No. 46, and in doubles of No. 375 in 2017 by the WTA. Dodin has won one WTA Tour singles title, at the 2016 Coupe Banque Nationale, and a further 17 ITF Circuit titles. Her best result at a major is reaching the fourth round of the 2024 Australian Open.

== Personal life ==
Dodin was born on 24 October 1996 in Lille. An only child, she played tennis with her parents and was coached by her father, Frédéric Dodin. Her tennis idols include Maria Sharapova and Roger Federer.

== Career ==
=== 2011–13: French Open qualifying and first ITF Circuit title ===
Dodin began playing on the ITF Women's Circuit in July 2011 at the age of 14. She first participated at the $10k Valladolid tournament, where she qualified for the main draw. Her first significant achievement was in March 2012 at a $10k tournament in Bron, where she reached her first semifinal.

In April 2013, Dodin reached her first final on the professional tour and won the title at the tournament in Les Franqueses del Vallès. She followed this up with her first qualifying of a Grand Slam tournament at the French Open. As a wildcard, she faced a much higher ranked player, Teliana Pereira, and lost in straight sets.

=== 2014: Success on the ITF Circuit, top 200 debut ===
Dodin did not make any progress in the first four months of 2014 but then won two back-to-back $10k tournaments in Antalya and Amarante. In July, she reached the semifinals of a $15k tournament in Imola, before making it to the final of the $10k event in Valladolid. In September, she won her first $25k-level tournament in Shrewsbury and made her debut in the top 500.

This helped her make her WTA Tour debut – qualifying at the Luxembourg Open. She failed to reach the main draw, losing to Ivana Jorović. Dodin then reached her first final of the highest ITF-level tournament in Poitiers. She also advanced to the semifinals of the Open de Limoges, her debut on the WTA Challenger Tour. Finally, she won the $25k Zawada tournament by defeating Jeļena Ostapenko in the final, and so made her debut in the top 200.

=== 2015: Major and WTA Tour debut ===
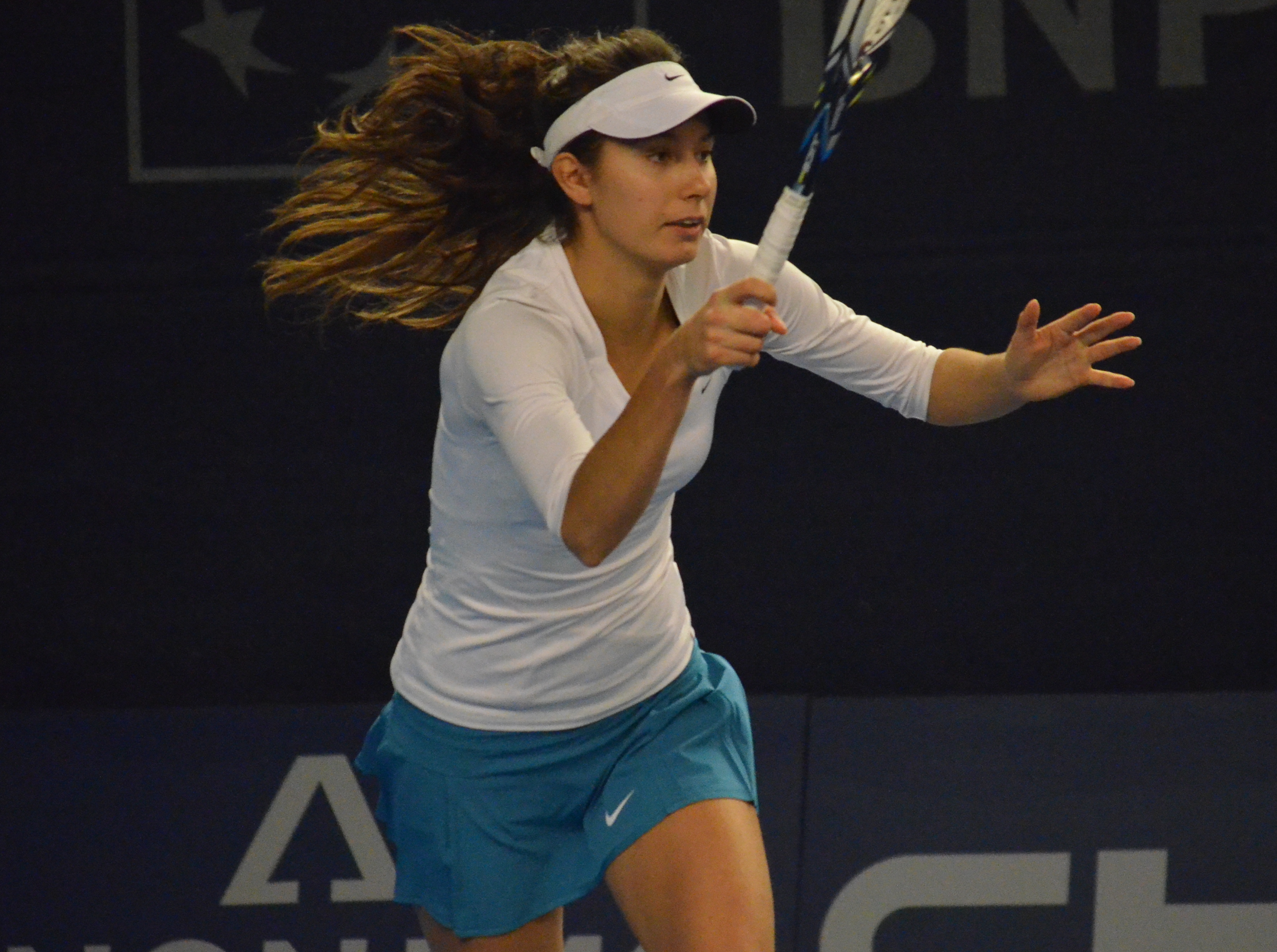
Dodin at the 2015 Luxembourg Open

In the new season, Dodin made her major main-draw debut at the Australian Open due to a wildcard. She won her first match defeating Alison Riske. In the following round, she faced Karolína Plíšková and she lost in the three sets. After a few attempts, she made her WTA Tour debut as a lucky loser at the Internationaux de Strasbourg. At the French Open, she was handed another wildcard for a major but lost to Kurumi Nara in the first round.

In early June, she made her debut on grass, playing in the main draw of the Rosmalen Championships. At Wimbledon, she failed to reach the main draw and was forced to return to the ITF Circuit. At the US Open, she received another wildcard which allowed her to achieve a big win, when she defeated former No. 1, Jelena Janković, in the first round. By the end of the year, she played two more WTA tournament qualifyings. She first failed at the Linz Open, but then succeeded at the Luxembourg Open. She finished the year winning the title at the $25k Shrewsbury tournament.

=== 2016: Breakthrough, WTA Tour singles title and top 100 debut ===
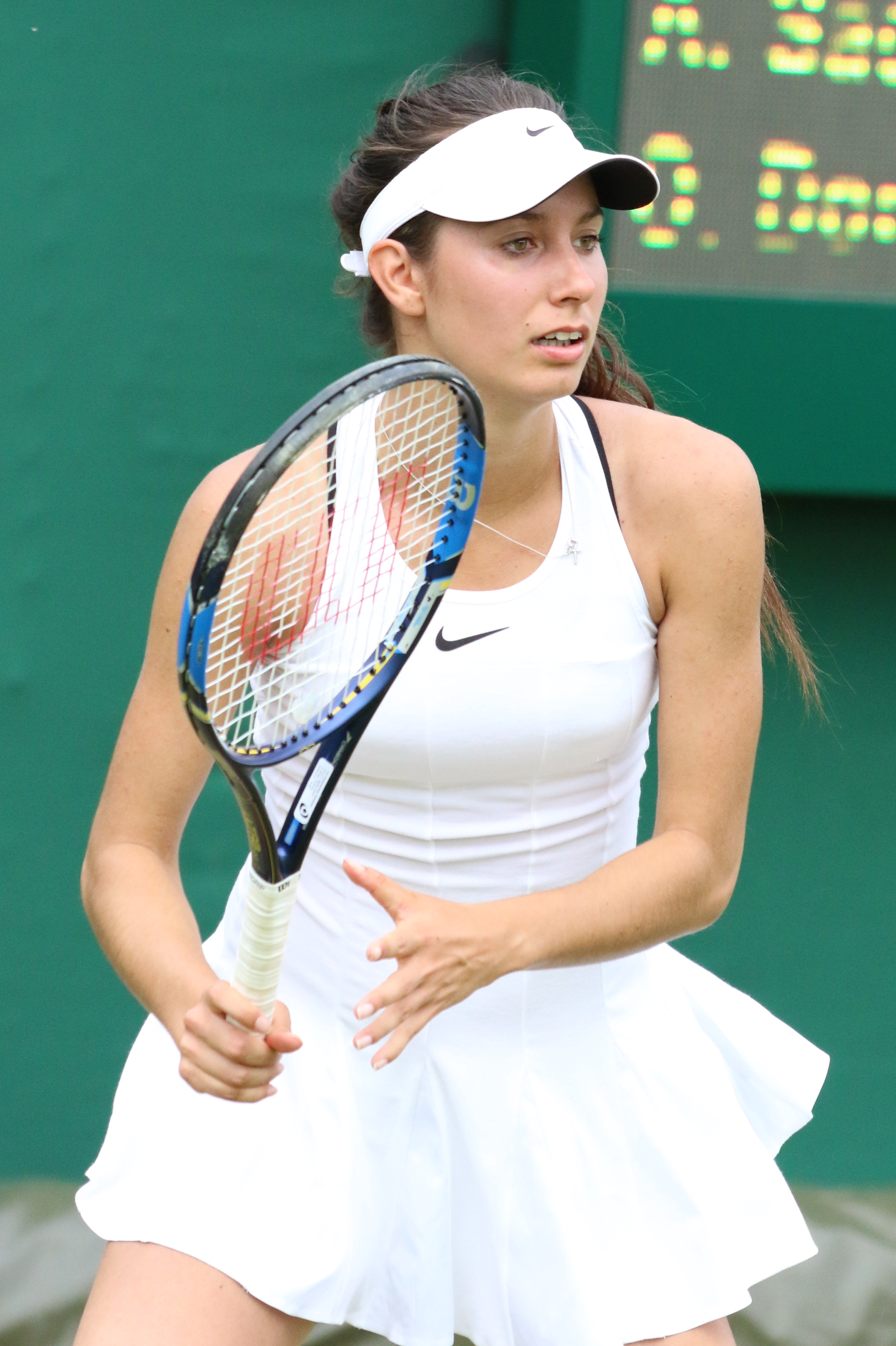
Dodin, 2016

The start of the year was not promising for Dodin. She failed in qualifying at Brisbane and Hobart, followed up with a first-round loss at the Australian Open. This brought her back to the ITF Circuit. However, from late January until April, she reached four ITF semifinals, including two $50k-level tournaments — at Andrézieux-Bouthéon and Croissy-Beaubourg. In April, she passed qualifying at two WTA events — the Stuttgart Open and Prague Open. Then, at the Madrid Open, she tried to make her Premier 5/Mandatory main-draw debut but failed in qualifying. At the French Open, she was handed a wildcard, but lost to former No. 1, Ana Ivanovic. After losing in the Wimbledon qualifying, she reached the final of the $100k Contrexéville clay court tournament. She lost to compatriot Pauline Parmentier.

Her switch to hardcourt tournaments that year was not successful. She lost in the first round of the Washington Open and failed to qualify into the Canadian Open. She returned to the ITF Circuit where she advanced into two $25k finals, losing the first but winning the second one. Between these two tournaments, she failed in the qualifying of the US Open. Following this, she participated at the carpet tournament Tournoi de Québec, where she had her breakthrough. In the final, she defeated qualifier Lauren Davis in straight sets. This result made her rank in the top 100 for the first time. A month later, as a qualifier, she reached the quarterfinals of the Ladies Linz after defeating two top 100 players - Kristýna Plíšková and Sorana Cîrstea. She then lost to Madison Keys. Two weeks later, she won the $100k Poitiers tournaments, again defeating Davis in the final.

=== 2017: First top 10 win, top 50 debut and highest singles ranking ===
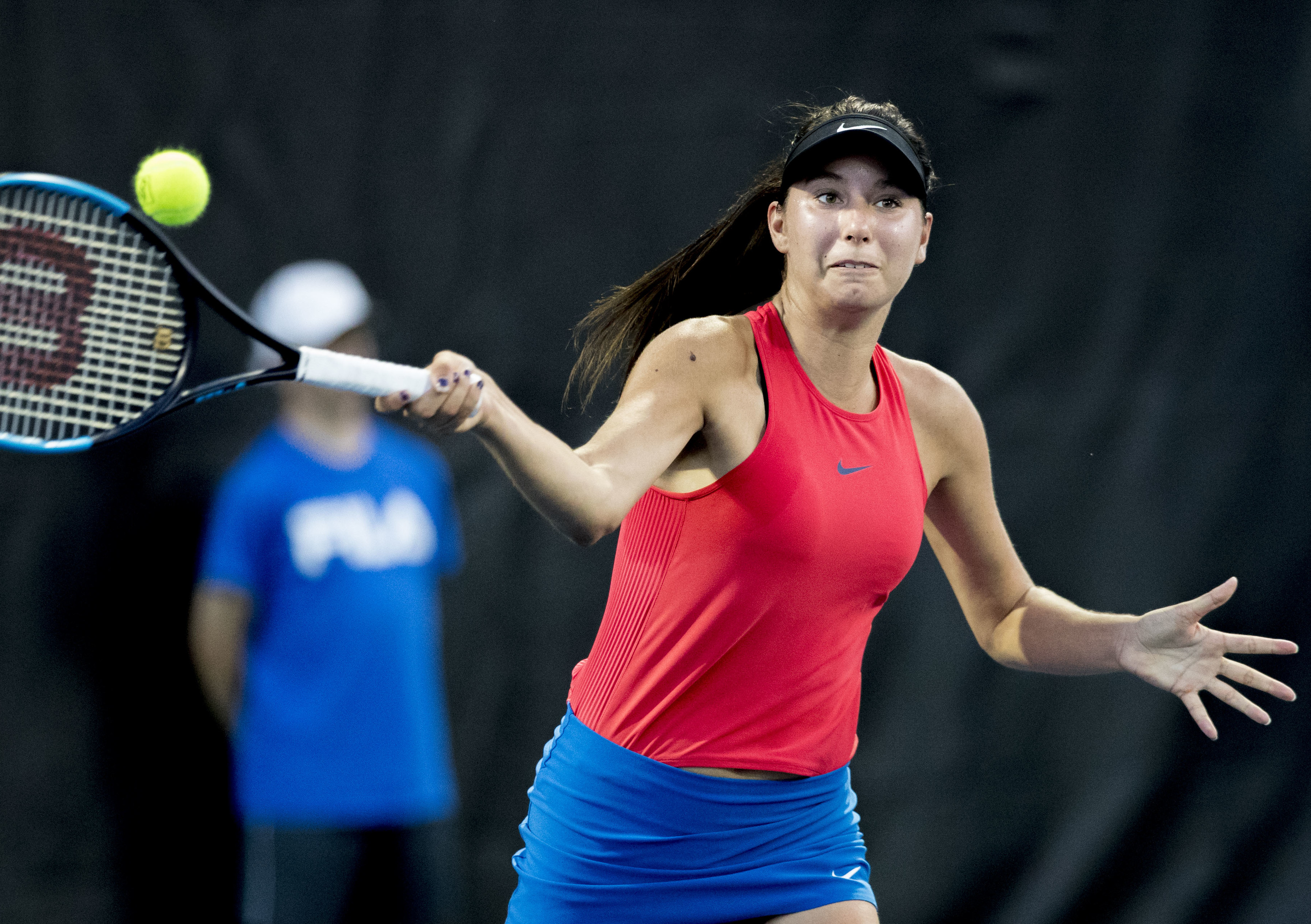
Dodin at the 2017 Washington Open

Dodin started the year with first-round losses in the qualifying draw at the Brisbane International and Sydney International. At the Australian Open, she came close to reaching her first major third round. She won the first set against Caroline Garcia in the second round, but then Garcia made a turnaround. In late February, Dodin advanced to the quarterfinals of the Hungarian Ladies Open. In the quarterfinal match against Tímea Babos, she won the second set but lost the third. At the Sunshine Doubles – Indian Wells and Miami Open, she made her Premier Mandatory debut but lost in the first rounds of both tournaments. As a qualifier at the third Premier Mandatory tournament of the year, the Madrid Open, Dodin realized two important wins. She first defeated former top-10 player Andrea Petkovic and then made her first top-ten win over No. 5, Dominika Cibulková. In the third round, she lost to Kristina Mladenovic winning only three games.

Dodin then started to struggle with form. She failed to qualify into the Premier-5 Italian Open, following this up with second rounds at the Nuremberg Cup and French Open. She started preparing for the grass-court season at the $100k Surbiton Trophy, where she advanced to the semifinals. As a result, she reached her highest singles ranking at world No. 46 on 12 June 2017. At the next two grass tournaments — Nottingam Open and $100k Ilkley Trophy — she failed in the first round. The same happened at Wimbledon, losing to Lucie Šafářová. A promising comeback happened at the following Washington Open where she switched from grass to hardcourt. There, she won against two former top-ten players, Jelena Janković and Sara Errani, followed by a win over top-20 player Sabine Lisicki. During her second-round match against Errani, Dodin saved three match points. In the semifinal match, she won the first set but then Ekaterina Makarova prevailed. By the end of year, she missed achieving any more significant results, losing in the early rounds of the Premier-5 Canadian Open and Cincinnati Open, and the US Open. She finished the year failing to defend her title at Québec, with a walkover after the first round due to dizziness.

=== 2018–21: Struggles with form, return to top 100 ===
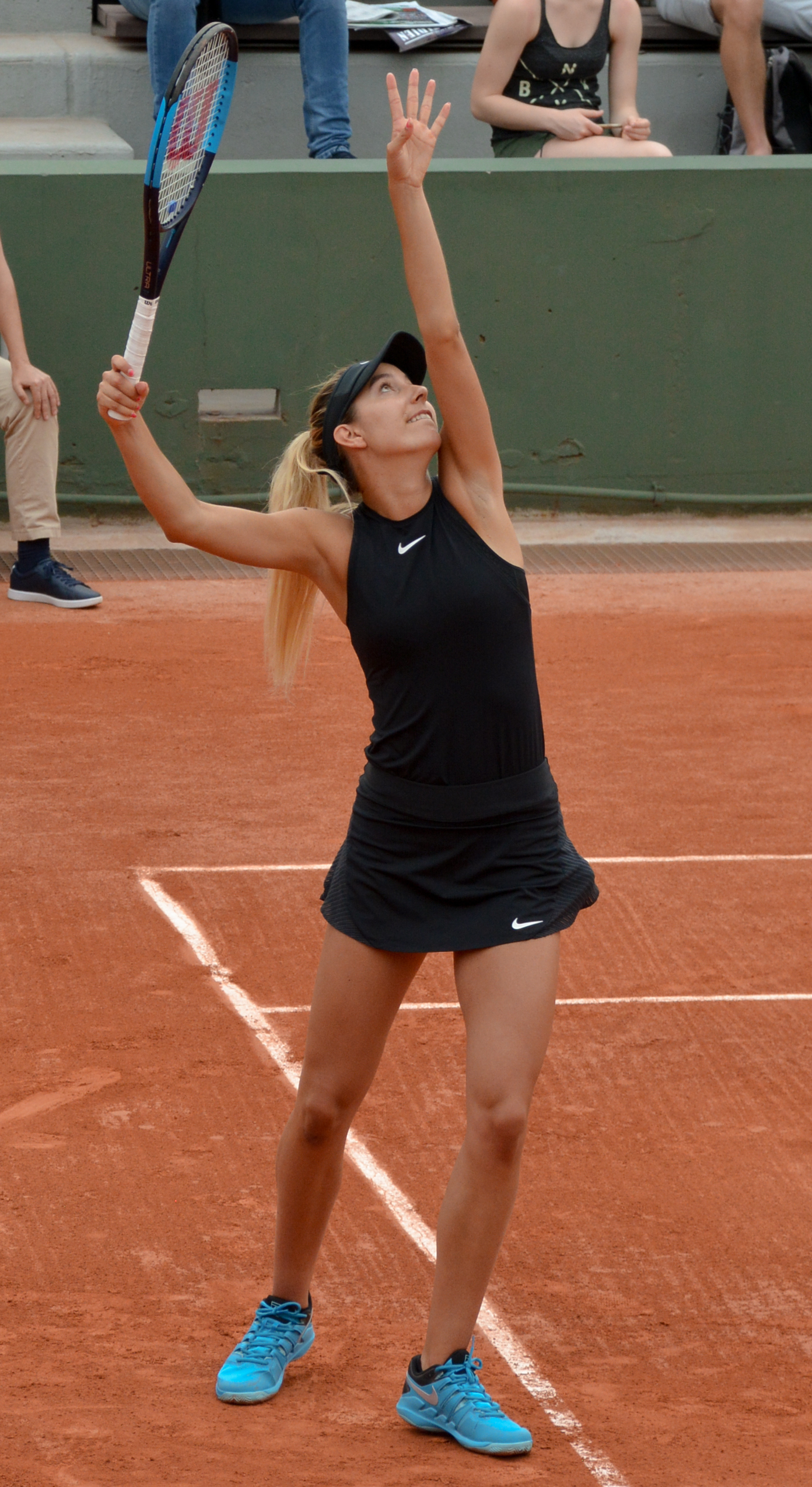
Dodin at the 2018 French Open

Dodin got attention at the 2018 Miami Open, when she won the first set against world No. 1, Simona Halep, before losing the second-round match. Her other results during the season include first rounds at the Australian Open and French Open, as well as only the second round of qualifying at Wimbledon. In July, at the $100k Contrexéville tournament, she was forced to retire in the first round after the first set due to health problems. She could not play for the rest of the season.

Dodin returned in April 2019 to the ITF Circuit due to a drop in her rank. Her performance improved and in June she reached the semifinals of the $25k+H Figueira da Foz tournament. Two weeks later, she advanced to the final of the $25k Corroios-Seixal tournament. Soon after, she reached another $25k level semifinal, followed up with a same-level final in Koksijde. In early October, she won the title at the $25k+H Cherbourg-en-Cotentin tournament after defeating compatriot Harmony Tan. It was her first ITF title in three years. She finished the season with further success on the ITF Circuit, including the semifinals at the $80k Internationaux de Poitiers, as well as two $25k semifinals and one final.

In early February 2020, as a qualifier, Dodin advanced to the quarterfinals of the Premier St. Petersburg Trophy where she defeated Viktória Kužmová and former top-10 player Johanna Konta in the first two rounds. In her quarterfinal match against Elena Rybakina, Dodin won the first set and had match points but then lost the following two sets. She then won the title at the $25k Mâcon tournament. The following week, she reached the quarterfinal of the Lyon Open where she lost to No. 5, Sofia Kenin. She then started to struggle, reaching only first rounds of tournaments such as the Premier 5 Cincinnati Open and the US Open. After winning the $25k tournament at Reims in late October, she came to Linz as a qualifier and advanced to the quarterfinals. There, she lost to Aryna Sabalenka, being forced to retire during the second set. After these results, she ultimately finished 2020 ranked No. 107.

Dodin struggled with form during the 2021 season. Her first WTA Tour-level win was in May at the Serbia Open where she defeated Kristýna Plíšková in the first round. In the following round, she lost to Nadia Podoroska. She then had two first-round losses at Strasbourg and the French Open. Her grass-court season started with playing at the Nottingham Open, where she beat former top-10 player, CoCo Vandeweghe, in the first round. At Wimbledon, she failed in the last stage of qualifying. In late July, she advanced to the semifinals of the Palermo Ladies Open but lost her semifinal match to Elena-Gabriela Ruse in three sets. She followed this up with her first win at the WTA 1000 Canadian Open, defeating Karolína Muchová in the first round. In September, despite having not qualified for the main draw of the US Open, Dodin made her return to the top 100. Her last tour-level win was at the Luxembourg Open, where she beat Anastasia Zakharova. Her last tournament of the year was the WTA 500 Ostrava Open where she lost to Magda Linette in the opening round. She finished the season ranked No. 101.

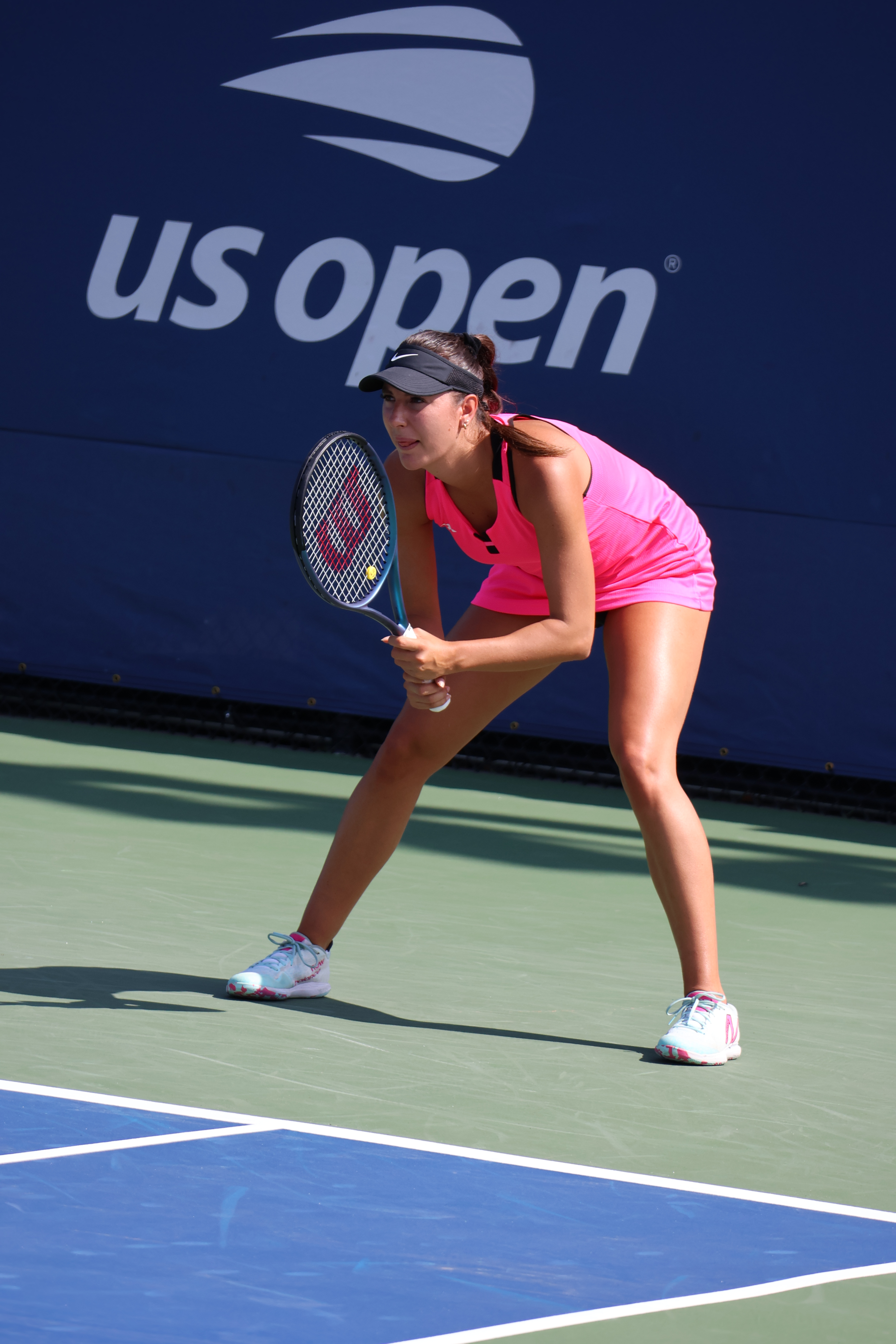
Dodin at the 2023 US Open

=== 2023–24: First French Open win since 2017, Australian Open 4th round ===
Ranked No. 122 at the 2023 French Open, she recorded her first major win in six years over wildcard player and compatriot, Séléna Janicijevic, avenging her loss in Strasbourg. In the second round, she lost to seventh seed Ons Jabeur. Closing out 2023, she scored consecutive titles in France and Luxembourg to bring her ranking back into the top 100 at a season high of No. 93.

At the 2024 Australian Open, she reached the fourth round of a major for the first time in her career, having never got past the second round before, defeating 29th seed Zhu Lin, Martina Trevisan and compatriot Clara Burel, before losing to Zheng Qinwen. As a result, she moved 20 positions up in the top 75 of the rankings.

At the WTA 1000 Miami Open, she replaced 29th seed Marta Kostyuk, after her withdrawal, directly in the second round of the main draw as a lucky loser and reached the third round for the first time at this tournament defeating Arantxa Rus, before losing to third seed Coco Gauff.

At the WTA 1000 Italian Open, Dodin also entered the main draw as a lucky loser, replacing fourth seed Elena Rybakina after her late withdrawal directly into the second round. She retired injured while trailing against Irina-Camelia Begu.

== Playing style ==
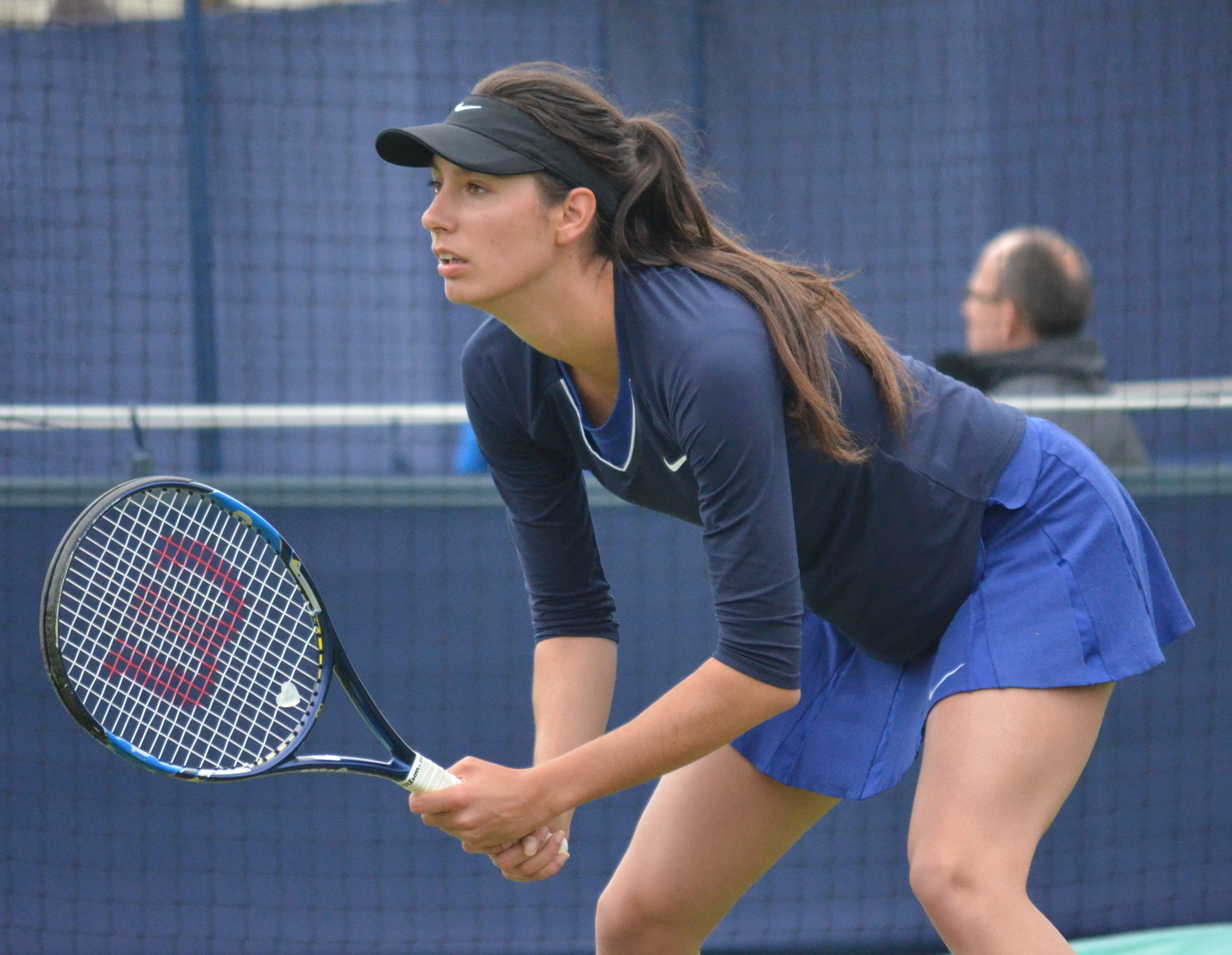
Dodin waiting for return

Océane Dodin is known for her ball-hitting power, an attribute common in her game. Her favorite streak consists of hitting hard from the baseline and concluding the point with a minimum of rallies (3 maximum), a risky game causing her to produce a high number of winning shots but also unforced errors during a match.

She declares herself to be more at ease on hardcourt than on clay, a surface less suited to her game. Her game is also suited to her limited endurance, the repetition of exchanges leading her to have side points. This style of play has been worked on since her early years in Villeneuve-d'Ascq targeting the glance and speed of execution.

In an interview for tennis.com, she said that she prefers her backhand over forehand, stating that backhand is something that makes her stronger. She also stated that her serve and forehand need improvement.

== Performance timelines ==
Key
W	F	SF	QF	#R	RR	Q#	P#	DNQ	A	Z#	PO	G	S	B	NMS	NTI	P	NH

(W) winner; (F) finalist; (SF) semifinalist; (QF) quarterfinalist; (#R) rounds 4, 3, 2, 1; (RR) round-robin stage; (Q#) qualification round; (P#) preliminary round; (DNQ) did not qualify; (A) absent; (Z#) Davis/Fed Cup Zonal Group (with number indication) or (PO) play-off; (G) gold, (S) silver or (B) bronze Olympic/Paralympic medal; (NMS) not a Masters tournament; (NTI) not a Tier I tournament; (P) postponed; (NH) not held; (SR) strike rate (events won / competed); (W–L) win–loss record.
To avoid confusion and double counting, these charts are updated at the conclusion of a tournament or when the player's participation has ended.

Only main-draw results in WTA Tour, Grand Slam tournaments, Fed Cup/Billie Jean King Cup and Olympic Games are included in win–loss records.

=== Singles ===
Current through the 2024 US Open.

Tournament	2013	2014	2015	2016	2017	2018	2019	2020	2021	2022	2023	2024	SR	W–L	Win %
Grand Slam tournaments
Australian Open	A	A	2R	1R	2R	1R	A	Q1	Q1	1R	A	4R	0 / 6	5–6	45%
French Open	Q1	A	1R	1R	2R	1R	Q1	1R	1R	1R	2R	A	0 / 8	2–8	20%
Wimbledon	A	A	Q1	Q1	1R	Q2	Q3	NH	Q3	1R	Q2	1R	0 / 3	0–3	0%
US Open	A	A	2R	Q1	2R	A	A	1R	Q3	1R	Q3	1R	0 / 5	2–5	29%
Win–loss	0–0	0–0	2–3	0–2	3–4	0–2	0–0	0–2	0–1	0–4	1–1	3–3	0 / 22	9–22	29%
WTA 1000
Dubai / Qatar Open (Note: The first Premier 5 event of the year has switched back and forth between the Dubai Tennis Championships and the Qatar Ladies Open since 2009. Dubai was classified as a Premier 5 event from 2009 to 2011 before being succeeded by Doha for the 2012–2014 period. In 2015, Dubai regained its Premier 5 status while Doha was demoted to Premier status. The Premier 5 tournaments were reclassified as WTA 1000 tournaments in 2021.)	A	A	A	A	A	Q1	A	A	A	1R	Q2	A	0 / 1	0–1	0%
Indian Wells Open	A	A	A	A	1R	A	A	NH	A	1R	A	2R	0 / 2	2–3	40%
Miami Open	A	A	Q1	A	1R	2R	A	NH	1R	A	A	3R	0 / 4	2–4	33%
Madrid Open	A	A	A	Q1	3R	A	A	NH	Q1	1R	Q1	Q1	0 / 2	2–2	50%
Italian Open	A	A	A	A	Q2	A	A	A	A	A	Q2	2R	0 / 1	0–1	0%
Canadian Open	A	A	A	Q1	1R	A	A	NH	2R	A	A	A	0 / 2	1–2	33%
Cincinnati Open	A	A	A	A	1R	A	A	1R	A	A	A	A	0 / 2	0–2	0%
Pan Pacific / Wuhan Open (Note: In 2014, the Pan Pacific Open was downgraded to a Premier event and replaced by the Wuhan Open. The Premier 5 tournaments were reclassified as WTA 1000 tournaments in 2021.)	A	A	A	A	A	A	A	NH				A	0 / 0	0–0	–
China Open	A	A	A	A	A	A	A	NH			A	A	0 / 0	0–0	–
Career statistics
Tournaments	0	0	6	8	16	7	0	7	11	15	2	3	Career total: 75		
Titles	0	0	0	1	0	0	0	0	0	0	0	0	Career total: 1		
Finals	0	0	0	1	0	0	0	0	0	0	0	0	Career total: 1		
Overall win–loss (Note: 2011: WTA ranking–1170, 2012: WTA ranking–767.)	0–0	0–0	2–6	7–7	14–15	1–7	0–0	6–7	7–11	5–16	1–3		1 / 72	43–72	37%
Year-end ranking	609	245	150	71	85	319	192	107	101	108	102	104	$2,229,021		

== WTA Tour finals ==
=== Singles: 1 (title) ===
Legend WTA 250 (1–0)	Finals by surface Carpet (1–0)	Finals by setting Indoor (1–0)

Result	Date	Tournament	Tier	Surface	Opponent	Score
Win	Sep 2016	Tournoi de Québec, Canada	International (Note: The WTA International tournaments were reclassified as WTA 250 tournaments in 2021.)	Carpet (i)	(United States) Lauren Davis	6–4, 6–3

== ITF Circuit finals ==
=== Singles: 30 (17 titles, 13 runner-ups) ===
Legend $100,000 tournaments (1–2) $60/75,000 tournaments (3–5) $40,000 tournaments (1–0) $25,000 tournaments (9–5) $10,000 tournaments (3–1)	Finals by surface Hard (15–10) Clay (1–3) Carpet (1–0)

Result	W–L	Date	Tournament	Tier	Surface	Opponent	Score
Win	1–0	Apr 2013	ITF Les Franqueses del Vallès, Spain	10,000	Hard	(Switzerland) Tess Sugnaux	6–3, 6–3
Win	2–0	May 2014	ITF Antalya, Turkey	10,000	Hard	(United States) Alexa Guarachi	4–6, 6–4, 6–3
Win	3–0	Jun 2014	ITF Amarante, Portugal	10,000	Hard	(Ukraine) Valeriya Strakhova	6–3, 6–2
Loss	3–1	Jul 2014	ITF Valladolid, Spain	10,000	Hard	(Spain) Laura Pous Tió	6–4, 5–7, 2–6
Win	4–1	Sep 2014	GB Pro-Series Shrewsbury, UK	25,000	Hard (i)	(Germany) Carina Witthöft	6–4, 6–3
Loss	4–2	Oct 2014	ITF Poitiers, France	100,000	Hard (i)	(Hungary) Tímea Babos	3–6, 6–4, 5–7
Win	5–2	Nov 2014	ITF Zawada, Poland	25,000	Carpet (i)	(Latvia) Jeļena Ostapenko	7–5, 6–4
Loss	5–3	Aug 2015	ITF Westende, Belgium	25,000	Hard	(Romania) Mihaela Buzărnescu	1–6, 1–6
Win	6–3	Nov 2015	GB Pro-Series Shrewsbury, UK (2)	25,000	Hard (i)	(United Kingdom) Freya Christie	7–6^{(3)}, 7–5
Loss	6–4	Jul 2016	Contrexéville Open, France	100,000	Clay	(France) Pauline Parmentier	1–6, 1–6
Loss	6–5	Aug 2016	ITF Koksijde, Belgium	25,000	Clay	(Netherlands) Richèl Hogenkamp	3–6, 6–4, 3–6
Win	7–5	Sep 2016	ITF Barcelona, Spain	25,000	Clay	(Romania) Ioana Loredana Roșca	6–3, 6–4
Win	8–5	Oct 2016	ITF Poitiers, France	100,000	Hard (i)	(United States) Lauren Davis	6–4, 6–2
Loss	8–6	Jul 2019	ITF Corroios, Portugal	W25	Hard	(Turkey) Pemra Özgen	6–3, 4–6, 3–6
Loss	8–7	Aug 2019	ITF Koksijde, Belgium	W25	Clay	(Netherlands) Richèl Hogenkamp	6–4, 1–6, 4–6
Win	9–7	Oct 2019	ITF Cherbourg-en-Cotentin, France	W25+H	Hard (i)	(France) Harmony Tan	6–4, 6–2
Loss	9–8	Nov 2019	ITF Saint-Étienne, France	W25	Hard (i)	(Romania) Ana Bogdan	w/o
Win	10–8	Mar 2020	ITF Mâcon, France	W25	Hard (i)	(France) Jessika Ponchet	3–6, 6–1, 6–3
Win	11–8	Oct 2020	ITF Reims, France	W25	Hard (i)	(Russia) Liudmila Samsonova	6–4, 6–2
Loss	11–9	Nov 2021	Open Nantes Atlantique, France	W60	Hard (i)	(Ukraine) Anhelina Kalinina	6–7^{(4)}, 0–1 ret.
Win	12–9	Nov 2021	ITF Pétange, Luxembourg	W25	Hard (i)	(Belarus) Anna Kubareva	6–3, 6–1
Win	13–9	Jan 2023	ITF Monastir, Tunisia	W25	Hard	(Belarus) Kristina Dmitruk	6–1, 6–1
Win	14–9	Jan 2023	Open Andrézieux-Bouthéon, France	W60	Hard (i)	(France) Audrey Albié	3–6, 6–2, 7–5
Win	15–9	Feb 2023	Open de l'Isère, France	W60	Hard (i)	(Switzerland) Simona Waltert	6–2, 7–5
Loss	15–10	Mar 2023	Trnava Indoor, Slovakia	W60	Hard (i)	(Romania) Jaqueline Cristian	6–7^{(7)}, 6–7^{(4)}
Loss	15–11	Mar 2023	Trnava Indoor 2, Slovakia	W60	Hard (i)	(Czech Republic) Lucie Havlíčková	6–3, 6–7^{(4)}, 5–7
Win	16–11	Oct 2023	Open Nantes Atlantique, France	W60	Hard (i)	(Czech Republic) Gabriela Knutson	6–7^{(2)}, 6–3, 6–2
Win	17–11	Nov 2023	ITF Pétange, Luxembourg (2)	W40	Hard (i)	(Philippines) Alex Eala	6–1, 7–5
Loss	17–12	Nov 2024	ITF Pétange, Luxembourg	W75	Hard (i)	(Switzerland) Céline Naef	2–6, 4–6
Loss	17–13	Oct 2026	Internationaux Féminins de la Vienne, France	W75	Hard (i)	(Ukraine) Veronika Podrez	3–6, 5–7

== Wins over top-10 players ==
- Dodin's match record against players who were, at the time the match was played, ranked in the top 10.

#	Player	Rank	Event	Surface	Rd	Score
2017
1.	(Slovakia) Dominika Cibulková	5	Madrid Open, Spain	Clay	2R	6–2, 6–4
