= Grand Est Open 88 =

WTA 125K series
- Location: Contrexéville, France
- Venue: Tennis Club de Contrexéville
- Category: WTA 125
- Surface: Clay
- Draw: 32S/16Q/6D
- Prize money: $115,000
- Website: Official website

Current champions (2026)
- Singles: (Egypt) Mayar Sherif
- Doubles: (France) Estelle Cascino (Argentina) Nicole Fossa Huergo

The Grand Est Open 88 (previously known as the Open 88 Contrexéville and the Lorraine Open 88) is a tournament for professional female tennis players on outdoor clay courts. The event is classified as a WTA 125 tournament and has been held in Contrexéville, France, since 2007. The tournament was held as an ITF event until 2021.

== Past finals ==
=== Singles ===
| Year | Champion | Runner-up | Score |
|---|---|---|---|
| 2026 | (Egypt) Mayar Sherif | (Belgium) Jeline Vandromme | 3–6, 7–6^{(7–0)}, 7–5 |
| 2025 | (United Kingdom) Francesca Jones | (France) Elsa Jacquemot | 6–4, 7–6^{(7–2)} |
| 2024 | (Italy) Lucia Bronzetti | (Egypt) Mayar Sherif | 6–4, 6–7^{(4–7)}, 7–5 |
| 2023 | (Netherlands) Arantxa Rus | Anastasia Pavlyuchenkova | 6–3, 6–3 |
| 2022 | (Italy) Sara Errani | (Hungary) Dalma Gálfi | 6–4, 1–6, 7–6^{(7–4)} |
⬆️ WTA 125 event ⬆️
| 2021 | (Ukraine) Anhelina Kalinina | (Hungary) Dalma Gálfi | 6–2, 6–2 |
| 2020 | Tournament cancelled due to the COVID-19 pandemic | | |
| 2019 | (Ukraine) Katarina Zavatska | (Norway) Ulrikke Eikeri | 6–4, 6–4 |
| 2018 | (Switzerland) Stefanie Vögele | (Spain) Sara Sorribes Tormo | 6–4, 6–2 |
| 2017 | (Sweden) Johanna Larsson | (Germany) Tatjana Maria | 6–1, 6–4 |
| 2016 | (France) Pauline Parmentier | (France) Océane Dodin | 6–1, 6–1 |
| 2015 | (Romania) Alexandra Dulgheru | (Kazakhstan) Yulia Putintseva | 6–3, 1–6, 7–5 |
| 2014 | (Romania) Irina-Camelia Begu | (Estonia) Kaia Kanepi | 6–3, 6–4 |
| 2013 | (Switzerland) Timea Bacsinszky | (Spain) Beatriz García Vidagany | 6–1, 6–1 |
| 2012 | (France) Aravane Rezaï | (Austria) Yvonne Meusburger | 6–3, 2–6, 6–3 |
| 2011 | (France) Iryna Brémond | (France) Stéphanie Foretz Gacon | 6–4, 6–7^{(1–7)}, 6–2 |
| 2010 | (Australia) Jelena Dokić | (France) Olivia Sanchez | 4–6, 6–3, 6–1 |
| 2009 | (Russia) Ekaterina Bychkova | (Germany) Kathrin Wörle | 6–4, 6–4 |
| 2008 | (Romania) Raluca Olaru | (France) Stéphanie Foretz | 6–4, 6–2 |
| 2007 | (Germany) Andrea Petkovic | (Belarus) Ksenia Milevskaya | 6–2, 6–0 |

=== Doubles ===
| Year | Champions | Runners-up | Score |
|---|---|---|---|
| 2026 | (France) Estelle Cascino (Argentina) Nicole Fossa Huergo | (Spain) Yvonne Cavallé Reimers (Brazil) Laura Pigossi | 6–7^{(3–7)}, 6–2, [10–6] |
| 2025 | (United States) Quinn Gleason (Brazil) Ingrid Martins | (United Kingdom) Emily Appleton (Netherlands) Isabelle Haverlag | 6–1, 7–6^{(7–4)} |
| 2024 | (Georgia (country)) Oksana Kalashnikova (3); Iryna Shymanovich | (Chinese Taipei) Wu Fang-hsien (China) Zhang Shuai | 5–7, 6–3, [10–7] |
| 2023 | (Spain) Cristina Bucșa; Alena Fomina-Klotz | Amina Anshba (Czech Republic) Anastasia Dețiuc | 4–6, 6–3, [10–7] |
| 2022 | (Norway) Ulrikke Eikeri (2) (Slovakia) Tereza Mihalíková | (China) Han Xinyun; Alexandra Panova | 7–6^{(10–8)}, 6–2 |
⬆️ WTA 125 event ⬆️
| 2021 | (Kazakhstan) Anna Danilina (Norway) Ulrikke Eikeri | (Hungary) Dalma Gálfi (Belgium) Kimberley Zimmermann | 6–0, 1–6, [10–4] |
| 2020 | Tournament cancelled due to the COVID-19 pandemic | | |
| 2019 | (Spain) Georgina García Pérez (Georgia (country)) Oksana Kalashnikova (2) | (Kazakhstan) Anna Danilina (Netherlands) Eva Wacanno | 6–3, 6–3 |
| 2018 | (Belgium) An-Sophie Mestach (China) Zheng Saisai | (India) Prarthana Thombare (Netherlands) Eva Wacanno | 3–6, 6–2, [10–7] |
| 2017 | (Russia) Anastasiya Komardina (Bulgaria) Elitsa Kostova | (France) Manon Arcangioli (France) Sara Cakarevic | 6–3, 6–4 |
| 2016 | (Netherlands) Cindy Burger (Spain) Laura Pous Tió | (United States) Nicole Melichar (Czech Republic) Renata Voráčová | 6–1, 6–3 |
| 2015 | (Georgia (country)) Oksana Kalashnikova (Montenegro) Danka Kovinić | (France) Irina Ramialison (France) Constance Sibille | 2–6, 6–3, [10–6] |
| 2014 | (Russia) Alexandra Panova (France) Laura Thorpe | (Romania) Irina-Camelia Begu (Argentina) María Irigoyen | 6–3, 4–0, ret. |
| 2013 | (Argentina) Vanesa Furlanetto (France) Amandine Hesse | (Croatia) Ana Konjuh (Croatia) Silvia Njirić | 7–6^{(7–3)}, 6–4 |
| 2012 | (Ukraine) Yuliya Beygelzimer (Czech Republic) Renata Voráčová | (Croatia) Tereza Mrdeža (Croatia) Silvia Njirić | 6–1, 6–1 |
| 2011 | (Ukraine) Valentyna Ivakhnenko (Ukraine) Kateryna Kozlova | (Japan) Erika Sema (Brazil) Roxane Vaisemberg | 2–6, 7–5, [12–10] |
| 2010 | (Russia) Nina Bratchikova (Russia) Ekaterina Ivanova | (Australia) Jelena Dokić (Canada) Sharon Fichman | 4–6, 6–4, [10–3] |
| 2009 | (Austria) Yvonne Meusburger (Germany) Kathrin Wörle | (France) Stéphanie Cohen-Aloro (France) Pauline Parmentier | 6–2, 6–2 |
| 2008 | (France) Stéphanie Foretz (France) Aurélie Védy | (Argentina) Erica Krauth (Sweden) Hanna Nooni | 6–4, 6–4 |
| 2007 | (Czech Republic) Renata Voráčová (Czech Republic) Barbora Záhlavová-Strýcová | (Belarus) Ekaterina Dzehalevich (Belarus) Ksenia Milevskaya | 6–2, 6–2 |
