= Manon Arcangioli =

French tennis player

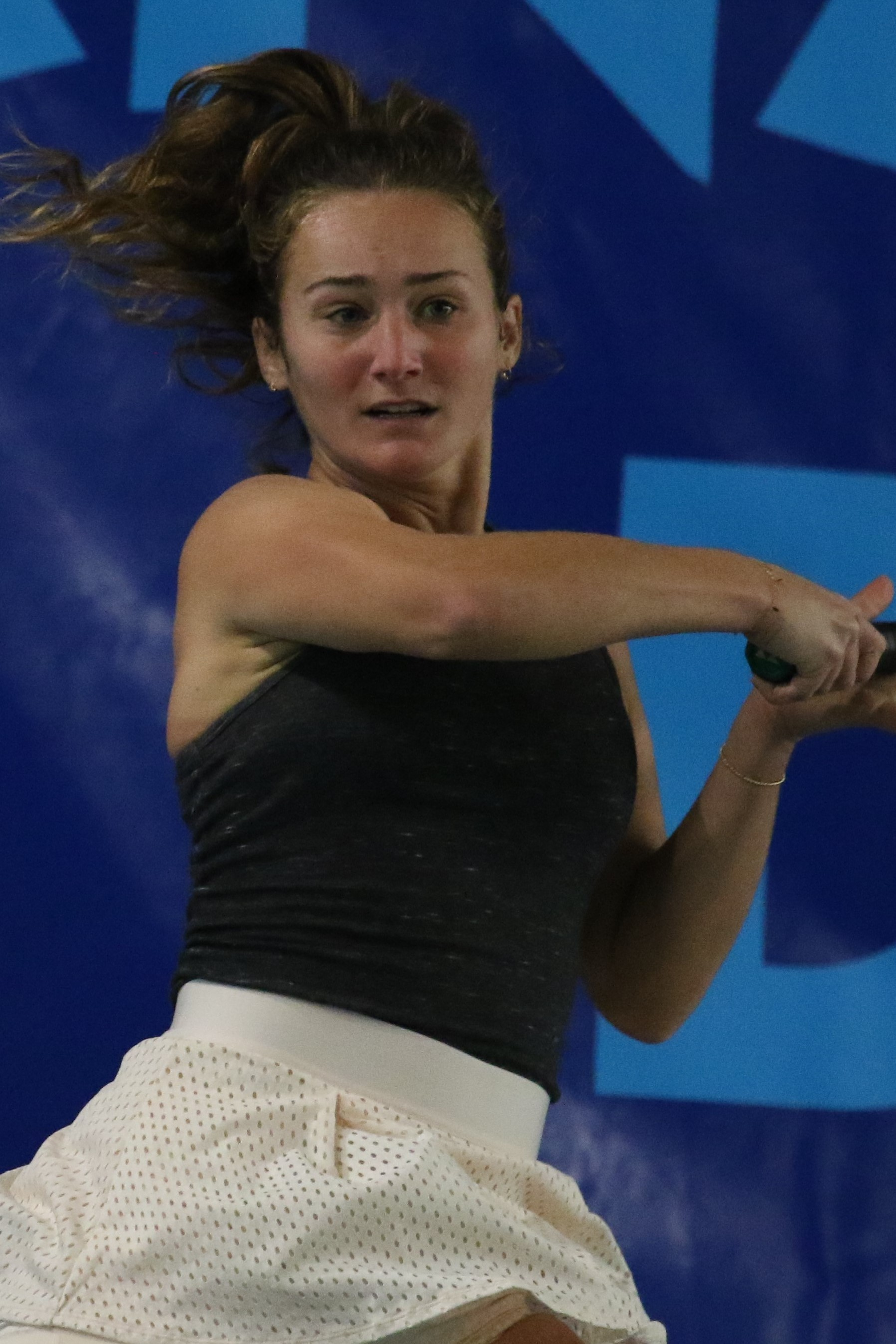
- Arcangioli at the 2021 ITF Poitiers
- Country (sports): France
- Residence: Lillebonne, France
- Born: 28 August 1994 (age 32) Rouen, France
- Height: 1.62 m (5 ft 4 in)
- Plays: Right (two-handed backhand)
- Prize money: $234,482

Singles
- Career record: 333–269
- Career titles: 8 ITF
- Highest ranking: No. 268 (2 March 2015)

Grand Slam singles results
- French Open: 1R (2015)

Doubles
- Career record: 195–163
- Career titles: 15 ITF
- Highest ranking: No. 189 (18 June 2018)

Grand Slam doubles results
- French Open: 1R (2015, 2016, 2017, 2018)

Grand Slam mixed doubles results
- French Open: 1R (2019)
- Last updated on: 21 September 2026.

Manon Arcangioli (French pronunciation: [manɔ̃ aʁkɑ̃ʒjɔli]; born 28 August 1994) is a French professional tennis player.

On 2 March 2015, she reached her best singles ranking of world No. 268. On 18 June 2018, she reached her best WTA doubles ranking of No. 189. Up to date, she has won eight singles and 15 doubles titles on the ITF Circuit.

== Career ==
Arcangioli made her major singles main-draw debut at the 2015 French Open thanks to a wildcard, and lost in the first round to the unseeded American Irina Falconi, in straight sets.

== ITF Circuit finals ==
=== Singles: 15 (8 titles, 7 runner-ups) ===
Legend W60 tournaments W25 tournaments W10/15 tournaments	Finals by surface Hard (3–6) Clay (3–1) Carpet (2–0)

Result	W–L	Date	Tournament	Tier	Surface	Opponent	Score
Loss	0–1	Oct 2012	ITF Heraklion, Greece	W10	Hard	(Switzerland) Corina Jäger	1–6, 4–6
Win	1–1	Nov 2012	ITF Heraklion	W10	Carpet	(Bulgaria) Borislava Botusharova	6–1, 6–2
Win	2–1	Nov 2012	ITF Heraklion	W10	Carpet	(Switzerland) Imane Maëlle Kocher	7–6^{(7)}, 6–3
Win	3–1	Jul 2013	ITF Maaseik, Belgium	W10	Clay	(Belgium) Greet Minnen	6–2, 3–6, 7–5
Loss	3–2	Mar 2014	ITF Amiens, France	W10	Clay (i)	(Italy) Alice Matteucci	4–6, 3–6
Loss	3–3	Nov 2014	ITF Sousse, Tunisia	W10	Hard	(Ukraine) Oleksandra Korashvili	3–6, 2–6
Win	4–3	Aug 2015	ITF Port El Kantaoui, Tunisia	W10	Hard	(Tunisia) Chiraz Bechri	6–4, 6–3
Loss	4–4	Feb 2016	ITF Sunderland, UK	W10	Hard (i)	(Liechtenstein) Kathinka von Deichmann	3–6, 6–7^{(2)}
Win	5–4	Feb 2017	ITF Edgbaston, UK	W15	Hard (i)	(Hungary) Panna Udvardy	7–6^{(4)}, 6–1
Win	6–4	Nov 2017	ITF Minsk, Belarus	W15	Hard (i)	(Belarus) Yuliya Hatouka	6–7^{(2)}, 6–3, 6–2
Loss	6–5	Dec 2017	ITF Milovice, Czech Republic	W15	Hard (i)	(Czech Republic) Miriam Kolodziejová	3–6, 3–6
Win	7–5	Apr 2018	ITF Santa Margherita di Pula, Italy	W25	Clay	(Italy) Martina Trevisan	2–6, 6–2, 6–4
Loss	7–6	Sep 2019	ITF Antalya, Turkey	W15	Hard	(Belarus) Nika Shytkouskaya	0–6, 3–6
Loss	7–7	Feb 2021	ITF Monastir, Tunisia	W15	Hard	(Czech Republic) Linda Fruhvirtová	6–7^{(7)}, 5–7
Win	8–7	Jul 2022	ITF Kottingbrunn, Austria	W15	Clay	(Italy) Dalila Spiteri	0–6, 6–4, 6–0

=== Doubles: 36 (16 titles, 20 runner-ups) ===
Legend W100 tournaments W80 tournaments W60 tournaments W25 tournaments W10/15 tournaments	Finals by surface Hard (11–11) Clay (5–9)

Result	W–L	Date	Tournament	Tier	Surface	Partner	Opponents	Score
Loss	0–1	Mar 2012	ITF Le Havre, France	W10	Clay (i)	(France) Kinnie Laisné	(France) Myrtille Georges (France) Céline Ghesquière	4–6, 2–6
Win	1–1	Oct 2012	ITF Mytilene, Greece	W10	Hard	(France) Laëtitia Sarrazin	(Germany) Stefanie Stemmer (Liechtenstein) Kathinka von Deichmann	6–4, 6–3
Win	2–1	Oct 2012	ITF Heraklion, Greece	W10	Hard	(France) Laëtitia Sarrazin	(Netherlands) Valeria Podda (Netherlands) Rosalie van der Hoek	7–6^{(4)}, 6–2
Win	3–1	Oct 2012	ITF Heraklion, Greece	W10	Hard	(France) Laëtitia Sarrazin	(Greece) Despina Papamichail (Greece) Despoina Vogasari	6–4, 6–4
Loss	3–2	Dec 2012	ITF Antalya, Turkey	W10	Clay	(France) Laëtitia Sarrazin	(Russia) Yuliya Kalabina (Belarus) Sviatlana Pirazhenka	3–6, 5–7
Loss	3–3	Aug 2014	ITF Bagnatica, Italy	W15	Clay	(Slovakia) Zuzana Zlochová	(Italy) Anastasia Grymalska (Switzerland) Conny Perrin	5–7, 6–3, [8–10]
Loss	3–4	Feb 2015	Open de l'Isère, France	W25	Hard (i)	(Netherlands) Cindy Burger	(Japan) Hiroko Kuwata (Netherlands) Demi Schuurs	1–6, 3–6
Win	4–4	Aug 2015	ITF Port El Kantaoui, Tunisia	W10	Hard	(Slovakia) Michaela Hončová	(Russia) Vera Aleshcheva (Russia) Maria Zotova	6–0, 6–1
Loss	4–5	Sep 2015	ITF Pétange, Luxembourg	W15	Hard (i)	(United Kingdom) Harriet Dart	(Belgium) Michaela Boev (Germany) Hristina Dishkova	2–6, 3–6
Win	5–5	Sep 2015	ITF Port El Kantaoui, Tunisia	W10	Hard	(Belarus) Sadafmoh Tolibova	(Russia) Olga Doroshina (Russia) Margarita Lazareva	3–6, 6–3, [10–6]
Win	6–5	Feb 2016	Open de l'Isère, France	W25	Hard (i)	(France) Alizé Lim	(Belarus) Lidziya Marozava (Switzerland) Amra Sadiković	7–5, 6–2
Loss	6–6	Feb 2016	ITF Sunderland, England	W10	Hard (i)	(United Kingdom) Harriet Dart	(United Kingdom) Emily Arbuthnott (Denmark) Emilie Francati	3–6, 6–4, [5–10]
Win	7–6	Mar 2016	ITF Mâcon, France	W10	Hard (i)	(Croatia) Silvia Njirić	(Denmark) Emilie Francati (Belarus) Vera Lapko	7–5, 7–6^{(5)}
Win	8–6	Apr 2016	ITF Hammamet, Tunisia	W10	Clay	(Italy) Angelica Moratelli	(Algeria) Inès Ibbou (Canada) Petra Januskova	6–3, 6–4
Win	9–6	Aug 2016	ITF Fleurus, Belgium	W10	Clay	(Belgium) Magali Kempen	(Belgium) Anastasia Smirnova (Belgium) Victoria Smirnova	6–2, 6–0
Loss	9–7	Oct 2016	ITF Clermont-Ferrand, France	W25	Hard (i)	(Croatia) Silvia Njirić	(Spain) Georgina García Pérez (Spain) Olga Sáez Larra	2–6, 6–3, [2–10]
Win	10–7	Nov 2016	ITF Heraklion, Greece	W10	Hard	(Greece) Despina Papamichail	(Denmark) Emilie Francati (United Kingdom) Sarah Beth Grey	6–4, 6–2
Loss	10–8	Apr 2017	Open de Seine-et-Marne, France	W60	Hard (i)	(Poland) Magdalena Fręch	(Belarus) Vera Lapko (Russia) Polina Monova	3–6, 4–6
Loss	10–9	Apr 2017	ITF Hammamet, Tunisia	W15	Clay	(France) Jessika Ponchet	(Brazil) Gabriela Cé (Venezuela) Andrea Gámiz	1–6, 2–6
Loss	10–10	Jun 2017	ITF Périgueux, France	W25	Clay	(France) Shérazad Reix	(Italy) Camilla Rosatello (Belgium) Kimberley Zimmermann	4–6, 3–6
Loss	10–11	Jul 2017	Contrexéville Open, France	W100	Clay	(France) Sara Cakarevic	(Bulgaria) Elitsa Kostova (Russia) Anastasiya Komardina	3–6, 4–6
Win	11–11	Oct 2017	ITF Cherbourg-en-Cotentin, France	W25	Hard (i)	(France) Shérazad Reix	(United Kingdom) Samantha Murray (India) Karman Thandi	3–1 ret.
Win	12–11	Nov 2017	Open Nantes Atlantique, France	W25	Hard (i)	(France) Shérazad Reix	(Netherlands) Lesley Kerkhove (Netherlands) Michaëlla Krajicek	6–2, 6–3
Loss	12–12	Nov 2017	ITF Minsk, Belarus	W15	Hard (i)	(Russia) Alena Tarasova	(Ukraine) Maryna Kolb (Ukraine) Nadiya Kolb	7–5, 4–6, [7–10]
Loss	12–13	Mar 2018	ITF Mâcon, Trance	W15	Hard (i)	(Latvia) Diāna Marcinkēviča	(France) Mathilde Armitano (France) Elixane Lechemia	1–6, 6–3, [8–10]
Loss	12–14	Apr 2018	ITF Santa Margherita di Pula, Italy	W25	Clay	(Slovakia) Chantal Škamlová	(Russia) Valeriya Solovyeva (Germany) Anna Zaja	5–7, 3–6
Loss	12–15	May 2018	Open Saint-Gaudens, France	W60	Clay	(France) Sherazad Reix	(Australia) Naiktha Bains (United States) Francesca Di Lorenzo	4–6, 6–1, [9–11]
Win	13–15	Sep 2018	ITF Sofia, Bulgaria	W25	Clay	(Belgium) Marie Benoît	(Russia) Amina Anshba (Russia) Polina Monova	6–4, 7–6^{(5)}
Loss	13–16	Sep 2018	ITF Clermont-Ferrand, France	W25	Hard (i)	(France) Shérazad Reix	(Switzerland) Leonie Küng (Bulgaria) Isabella Shinikova	2–6, 5–7
Win	14–16	Apr 2019	ITF Santa Margherita di Pula, Italy	W25	Clay	(France) Elixane Lechemia	(Russia) Victoria Kan (Russia) Anna Morgina	w/o
Win	15–16	Jul 2019	Open de Biarritz, France	W80	Clay	(Belgium) Kimberley Zimmermann	(Mexico) Victoria Rodríguez (Romania) Ioana Loredana Roșca	2–6, 6–3, [10–6]
Loss	15–17	Aug 2019	ITF Las Palmas, Spain	W25	Clay	(Belgium) Kimberley Zimmermann	(Spain) Marina Bassols Ribera (China) Feng Shuo	3–6, 1–6
Loss	15–18	Oct 2019	ITF Sharm El Sheikh, Egypt	W15	Hard	(France) Kélia Le Bihan	(Belarus) Viktoryia Kanapatskaya (Belarus) Katyarina Paulenka	3–6, 6–3, [4–10]
Loss	15–19	Nov 2019	ITF Monastir, Tunisia	W15	Hard	(France) Alice Robbe	(Serbia) Tamara Čurović (France) Carole Monnet	3–6, 4–6
Loss	15–20	Jan 2021	ITF Monastir, Tunisia	W15	Hard	(France) Salma Djoubri	(Russia) Darya Astakhova (Algeria) Inès Ibbou	3–6, 0–6
Win	16–20	Nov 2026	ITF Monastir, Tunisia	W15	Hard	(France) Astrid Cirotte	Anastasia Lizunova; Mariia Masiianskaia	5–7, 6–2, [10–5]
