= Sara Cakarevic =

French tennis player

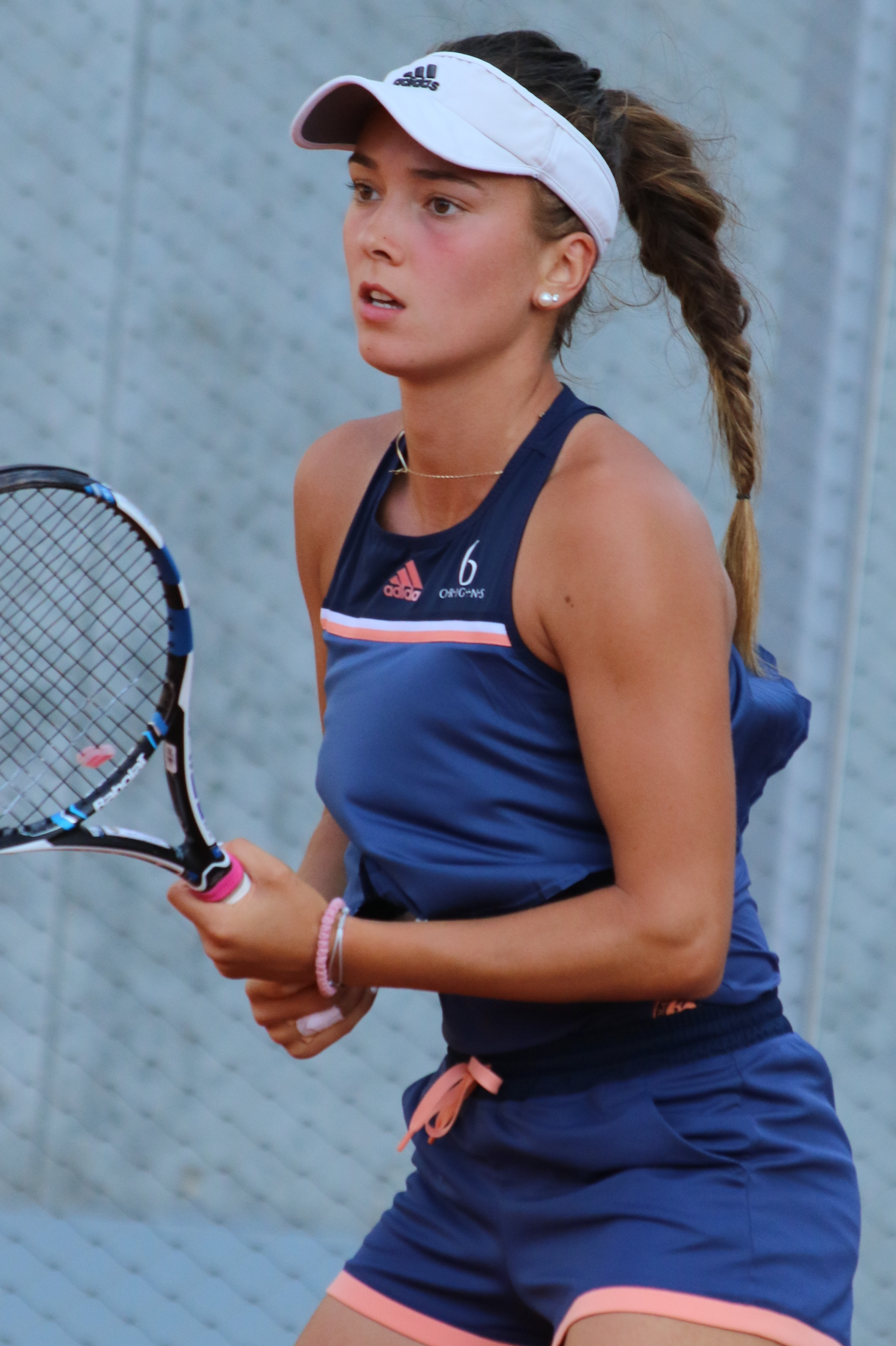
- Country (sports): France
- Born: 12 March 1997 (age 29)
- Plays: Right (two-handed backhand)
- Prize money: $162,213

Singles
- Career record: 345–272
- Career titles: 6 ITF
- Highest ranking: No. 284 (4 November 2024)
- Current ranking: No. 668 (9 November 2026)

Grand Slam singles results
- French Open: Q1 (2017, 2018)

Doubles
- Career record: 45–68
- Career titles: 1 ITF
- Highest ranking: No. 319 (30 October 2017)
- Current ranking: No. 799 (9 November 2026)

Grand Slam doubles results
- French Open: 1R (2018)

Grand Slam mixed doubles results
- French Open: 1R (2018)
- Last updated on: 15 November 2026 ).

Sara Cakarevic (Serbian: Сара Чакаревић, romanized: Sara Čakarević; born 12 March 1997) is a French tennis player.

She has a career-high WTA singles ranking of 284, achieved on 4 November 2024. Cakarevic also has a career-high doubles ranking of No. 319, reached on 30 October 2017. She has won six singles titles and one doubles title on the ITF World Tour.

Cakarevic made her major main-draw debut at the 2018 French Open, after receiving a wildcard into the women's doubles tournament, partnering with Jessika Ponchet.

== ITF Circuit finals ==
=== Singles: 15 (6 titles, 9 runner-ups) ===
Legend W40/50 tournaments W25/35 tournaments W10/15 tournaments	Finals by surface Hard (0–2) Clay (6–7)

Result	W–L	Date	Tournament	Tier	Surface	Opponent	Score
Loss	0–1	May 2016	ITF Heraklion, Greece	W10	Hard	(Latvia) Diāna Marcinkēviča	1–6, 3–6
Win	1–1	Jul 2016	ITF Prokuplje, Serbia	W10	Clay	(Japan) Satsuki Takamura	6–2, 6–0
Loss	1–2	Jul 2016	ITF Prokuplje, Serbia	W10	Clay	(Serbia) Katarina Jokić	4–6, 5–7
Loss	1–3	Aug 2016	Palić Open, Serbia	W10	Clay	(Hungary) Ágnes Bukta	4–6, 6–1, 4–6
Loss	1–4	Aug 2017	ITF Porto, Portugal	W15	Clay	(Slovakia) Michaela Hončová	7–5, 1–6, 5–7
Win	2–4	Dec 2017	ITF Hammamet, Tunisia	W15	Clay	(France) Margot Yerolymos	3–6, 6–3, 6–0
Win	3–4	Jan 2018	ITF Hammamet, Tunisia	W15	Clay	(Romania) Ioana Loredana Roșca	6–2, 7–6^{(4)}
Loss	3–5	Mar 2021	ITF Le Havre, France	W15	Clay	(Italy) Lucia Bronzetti	3–6, 1–6
Loss	3–6	Mar 2023	ITF Heraklion, Greece	W15	Clay	(Romania) Ilinca Amariei	4–6, 1–6
Win	4–6	Apr 2023	ITF Santa Margherita di Pula, Italy	W25	Clay	(Ukraine) Katarina Zavatska	6–2, 6–4
Win	5–6	Apr 2024	ITF Hammamet, Tunisia	W35	Clay	(Canada) Carson Branstine	6–3, 6–1
Loss	5–7	May 2024	ITF Kursumlijska Banja, Serbia	W35	Clay	(Serbia) Lola Radivojević	3–6, 4–6
Win	6–7	Sep 2024	ITF Santa Margherita di Pula, Italy	W35	Clay	(Italy) Matilde Paoletti	6–2, 7–6^{(8)}
Loss	6–8	Oct 2024	Open Nantes Atlantique, France	W50	Hard (i)	(France) Léolia Jeanjean	1–6, 3–6
Loss	6–7	Sep 2025	ITF Santa Margherita di Pula, Italy	W35	Clay	(Italy) Jennifer Ruggeri	4–6, 2–6

=== Doubles: 4 (1 title, 3 runner-ups) ===
Legend W100 tournaments W25 tournaments W15 tournaments	Finals by surface Hard (0–1) Clay (1–2)

Result	W–L	Date	Tournament	Tier	Surface	Partner	Opponents	Score
Loss	0–1	Jan 2017	ITF Fort-de-France, France (Martinique)	W15	Hard	(France) Emmanuelle Salas	(United States) Desirae Krawczyk (Mexico) Giuliana Olmos	3–6, 2–6
Loss	0–2	Apr 2017	ITF Santa Margherita di Pula, Italy	W25	Clay	(Romania) Nicoleta Dascălu	(Romania) Irina Bara (Croatia) Tereza Mrdeža	4–6, 2–6
Loss	0–3	Jul 2017	Contrexéville Open, France	W100	Clay	(France) Manon Arcangioli	(Bulgaria) Elitsa Kostova (Russia) Anastasiya Komardina	3–6, 4–6
Win	1–3	Sep 2017	ITF Middelkerke, Belgium	W15	Clay	(Belgium) Magali Kempen	(Romania) Cristina Adamescu (Spain) Cristina Bucșa	6–4, 4–6, [10–5]
