= Michaela Hončová =

Slovak tennis player

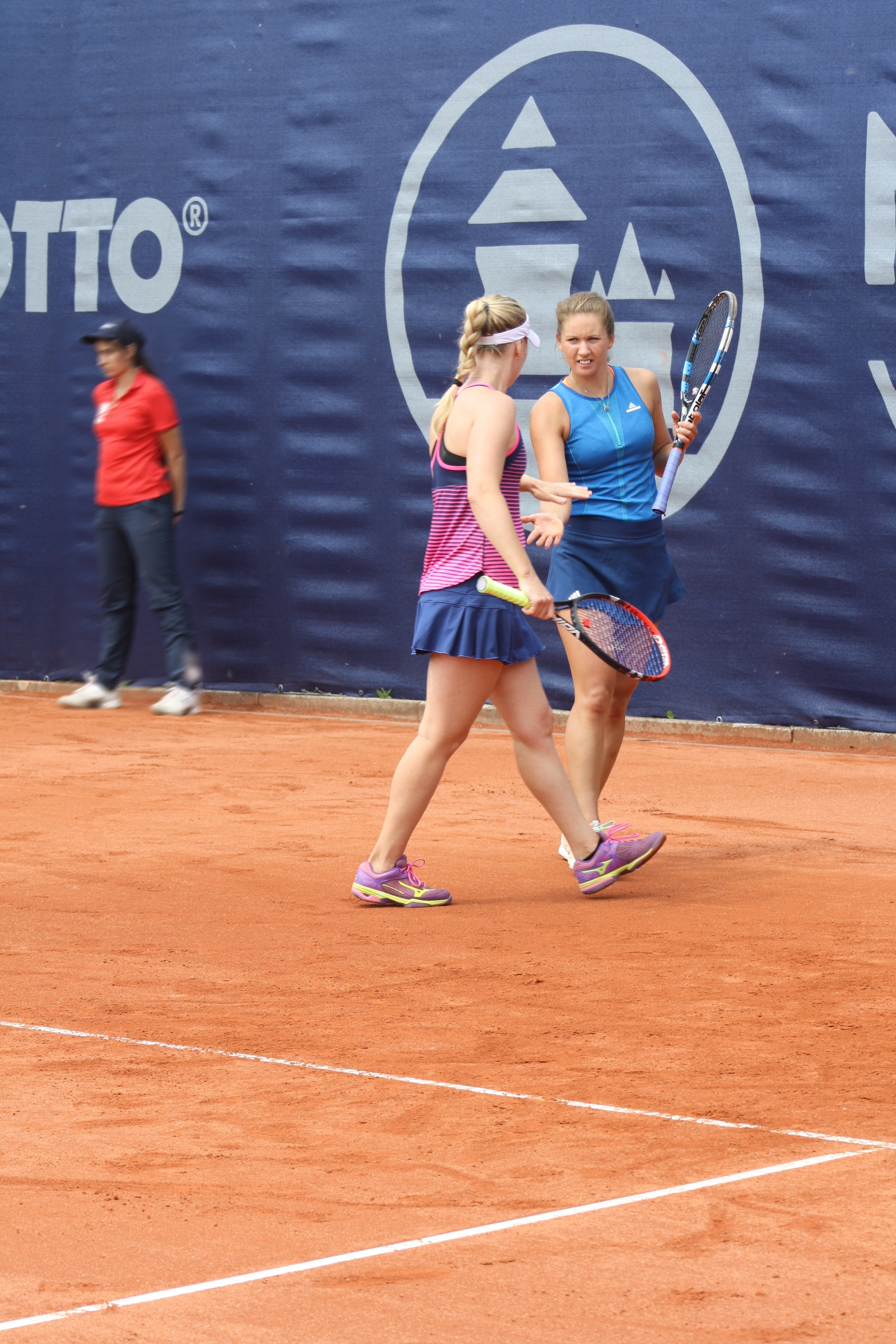
- Michaela Hončová in 2015
- Country (sports): Slovakia
- Born: 22 December 1992 (age 32); Bratislava, Czechoslovakia
- Height: 1.70 m (5 ft 7 in)
- Plays: Right (two-handed backhand)
- Prize money: $175,007

Singles
- Career record: 293–238
- Career titles: 5 ITF
- Highest ranking: No. 218 (18 June 2018)

Doubles
- Career record: 140–136
- Career titles: 9 ITF
- Highest ranking: No. 162 (18 June 2018)

Michaela Hončová (Slovak pronunciation: [ˈmixaela ˈɦɔntʂɔʋaː]; born 22 December 1992) is an inactive Slovak tennis player.

Hončová has won five singles titles and nine doubles titles on the ITF Women's Circuit. On 18 June 2018, she reached her best singles ranking of world No. 218, and peaked at No. 162 in the WTA doubles rankings.

== ITF Circuit finals ==
=== Singles: 12 (5 titles, 7 runner–ups) ===
Legend $25,000 tournaments $10/15,000 tournaments	Finals by surface Hard (2–4) Clay (3–3)

Result	W–L	Date	Tournament	Tier	Surface	Opponent	Score
Win	1–0	Jul 2010	ITF Horb, Germany	10,000	Clay	(Italy) Annalisa Bona	6–4, 6–2
Win	2–0	Nov 2010	ITF Stockholm, Sweden	10,000	Hard (i)	(Sweden) Anna Brazhnikova	6–4, 6–7^{(5)}, 6–3
Win	3–0	Jan 2011	ITF Tallinn, Estonia	10,000	Hard (i)	(Austria) Katharina Negrin	6–0, 6–4
Loss	3–1	Mar 2012	ITF Almaty, Kazakhstan	25,000	Hard (i)	(Ukraine) Anastasiya Vasylyeva	4–6, 1–6
Loss	3–2	Jul 2012	ITF Denain, France	25,000	Clay	(Slovakia) Kristína Kučová	2–6, 6–1, 2–6
Win	4–2	Jun 2013	Bredeney Ladies Open, Germany	10,000	Clay	(Slovakia) Chantal Škamlová	6–2, 6–2
Loss	4–3	Sep 2014	ITF Pétange, Luxembourg	10,000	Hard (i)	(China) Lu Jiajing	1–6, ret.
Loss	4–4	Mar 2015	ITF Gonesse, France	10,000	Clay (i)	(Ukraine) Olga Ianchuk	6–3, 5–7, 3–6
Loss	4–5	Sep 2015	ITF Pétange, Luxembourg	15,000	Hard (i)	(Belgium) Greet Minnen	0–6, 6–3, 3–6
Loss	4–6	Feb 2017	Trnava Indoor, Slovakia	15,000	Hard (i)	(Czech Republic) Pernilla Mendesová	2–6, 7–6^{(2)}, 6–7^{(4)}
Win	5–6	Jun 2017	ITF Porto, Portugal	15,000	Clay	(France) Sara Cakarevic	5–7, 6–1, 7–5
Loss	5–7	Oct 2017	ITF Pula, Italy	25,000	Clay	(United States) Chiara Scholl	1–6, 6–4, 1–6

=== Doubles: 24 (9 titles, 15 runner–ups) ===
Legend $100,000 tournaments $80,000 tournaments $50,000 tournaments $25,000 tournaments $10/15,000 tournaments	Finals by surface Hard (5–9) Clay (4–6)

Result	No.	Date	Tier	Tournament	Surface	Partner	Opponents	Score
Win	1.	Oct 2009	10,000	ITF Dubrovnik, Croatia	Clay	(Slovakia) Karin Morgošová	(France) Émilie Bacquet (Serbia) Nataša Zorić	6–4, 3–6, [10–6]
Loss	1.	Aug 2010	25,000	ITF Trnava, Slovakia	Clay	(Slovakia) Lenka Wienerová	(Czech Republic) Iveta Gerlová (Czech Republic) Lucie Kriegsmannová	2–6, 1–6
Win	2.	Nov 2011	25,000	ITF Vendryně, Czech Republic	Hard (i)	(Slovakia) Zuzana Luknárová	(Czech Republic) Iveta Gerlová (Czech Republic) Lucie Kriegsmannová	7–5, 6–4
Win	3.	Feb 2012	10,000	ITF Mâcon, France	Hard (i)	(Italy) Giulia Gatto-Monticone	(Netherlands) Kim Kilsdonk (Netherlands) Nicolette van Uitert	6–4, 1–6, [10–5]
Loss	2.	2 July 2012	25,000	ITF Denain, France	Clay	(Bulgaria) Isabella Shinikova	(France) Myrtille Georges (France) Céline Ghesquière	4–6, 2–6
Win	4.	Jun 2013	25,000	ITF Périgueux, France	Clay	(France) Laura Thorpe	(Netherlands) Anna Katalina Alzate (Bulgaria) Dia Evtimova	7–6^{(3)}, 6–1
Loss	3.	Sep 2013	25,000	Fergana Challenger, Uzbekistan	Hard	(Ukraine) Veronika Kapshay	(Ukraine) Lyudmyla Kichenok (Belarus) Polina Pekhova	4–6, 2–6
Loss	4.	Sep 2014	10,000	ITF Pétange, Luxembourg	Hard (i)	(Germany) Nora Niedmers	(Belgium) Elyne Boeykens (Netherlands) Kelly Versteeg	6–7^{(2)}, 1–6
Loss	5.	Feb 2015	10,000	Trnava Indoor, Slovakia	Hard (i)	(Slovakia) Lenka Juríková	(Austria) Anna Maria Heil (Latvia) Anastasija Sevastova	4–6, 3–6
Win	5.	Jul 2015	10,000	ITF Les Contamines, France	Hard	(France) Shérazad Reix	(Italy) Georgia Brescia (Netherlands) Erika Vogelsang	6–3, 6–4
Win	6.	Aug 2015	10,000	ITF Port El Kantaoui, Tunisia	Hard	(Oman) Fatma Al-Nabhani	(Russia) Margarita Lazareva (Argentina) Sofía Luini	6–2, 7–5
Win	7.	Aug 2015	10,000	ITF Port El Kantaoui	Hard	(France) Manon Arcangioli	(Russia) Vera Aleshcheva (Russia) Maria Zotova	6–0, 6–1
Loss	6.	Nov 2015	25,000	ITF Bratislava, Slovakia	Hard (i)	(Slovakia) Chantal Škamlová	(Slovenia) Dalila Jakupović (Germany) Anne Schäfer	7–6^{(5)}, 2–6, [8–10]
Loss	7.	Mar 2016	10,000	ITF Antalya, Turkey	Hard	(Slovakia) Chantal Škamlová	(Hungary) Ágnes Bukta (Slovakia) Vivien Juhászová	4–6, 1–6
Loss	8.	May 2016	50,000	Zhengzhou Open, China	Hard	(Uzbekistan) Akgul Amanmuradova	(China) Xun Fangying (China) You Xiaodi	6–1, 2–6, [7–10]
Win	8.	Jun 2016	25,000	ITF Denain, France	Clay	(France) Shérazad Reix	(United Kingdom) Amanda Carreras (Italy) Alice Savoretti	6–1, 6–3
Loss	9.	Aug 2016	25,000	ITF Leipzig, Germany	Clay	(Ukraine) Olga Ianchuk	(Germany) Nicola Geuer (Germany) Anna Klasen	6–7^{(4)}, 5–7
Loss	10.	Nov 2016	10,000	ITF Oslo, Norway	Hard (i)	(Denmark) Karen Barritza	(Netherlands) Chayenne Ewijk (Netherlands) Rosalie van der Hoek	4–6, 4–6
Win	9.	Mar 2017	15,000	ITF Heraklion, Greece	Clay	(Italy) Francesca Palmigiano	(Romania) Oana Georgeta Simion (Romania) Raluca Șerban	6–4, 6–3
Loss	11.	Jul 2017	80,000	ITS Cup, Czech Republic	Clay	(Romania) Raluca Șerban	(France) Amandine Hesse (Mexico) Victoria Rodríguez	6–3, 2–6, [6–10]
Loss	12.	Aug 2017	25,000	Montreux Ladies Open, Switzerland	Clay	(Bulgaria) Isabella Shinikova	(Switzerland) Xenia Knoll (Switzerland) Amra Sadiković	2–6, 5–7
Loss	13.	Sep 2017	100,000	Neva Cup St. Petersburg, Russia	Hard	(Switzerland) Belinda Bencic	(Russia) Anna Blinkova (Russia) Veronika Kudermetova	3–6, 1–6
Loss	14.	Oct 2017	25,000	ITF Pula, Italy	Clay	(Japan) Akiko Omae	(Italy) Anastasia Grymalska (United States) Chiara Scholl	6–4, 3–6, [11–13]
Loss	15.	Feb 2019	25,000	Trnava Indoor, Slovakia	Hard (i)	(Ukraine) Ganna Poznikhirenko	(Romania) Elena Bogdan (Bulgaria) Elitsa Kostova	5–7, 6–7^{(5)}
