= Eva Wacanno =

Dutch tennis player

- Country (sports): Netherlands
- Born: 6 February 1991 (age 35) Weert, Netherlands
- Prize money: $84,572

Singles
- Career record: 128–97
- Career titles: 2 ITF
- Highest ranking: No. 407 (14 December 2015)

Doubles
- Career record: 237–117
- Career titles: 35 ITF
- Highest ranking: No. 120 (16 April 2018)

Eva Wacanno (born 6 February 1991) is a Dutch former tennis player.

In her career, she won two singles titles and 35 doubles titles on the ITF Women's Circuit. On 14 December 2015, she reached her best singles ranking of world No. 407. On 16 April 2018, she peaked at No. 120 in the WTA doubles rankings.

Wacanno made her WTA Tour debut at the 2014 Internationaux de Strasbourg, in the doubles event, partnering Demi Schuurs, losing in the first round to the second seeds and eventual champions, Ashleigh Barty and Casey Dellacqua.

== ITF Circuit finals ==
=== Singles: 8 (2–6) ===
Legend $25,000 tournaments $10,000 tournaments	Finals by surface Hard (2–2) Clay (0–4)

Result	No.	Date	Tournament	Surface	Opponent	Score
Loss	1.	23 July 2011	ITF Knokke, Belgium	Clay	(Germany) Syna Kayser	3–6, 0–6
Loss	2.	11 August 2013	ITF Pirot, Serbia	Clay	(Greece) Valentini Grammatikopoulou	1–6, 4–6
Win	1.	23 February 2014	ITF Mâcon, France	Hard (i)	(France) Harmony Tan	6–1, 7–6^{(4)}
Loss	3.	18 January 2015	ITF Sharm El Sheikh, Egypt	Hard	(Philippines) Katharina Lehnert	5–7, 6–3, 4–6
Win	2.	24 January 2015	ITF Aktobe, Kazakhstan	Hard (i)	(Russia) Polina Vinogradova	2–6, 6–4, 6–1
Loss	4.	21 June 2015	ITF Sharm El Sheikh, Egypt	Hard	(Australia) Sara Tomic	4–6, 1–6
Loss	5.	2 August 2015	ITF Pärnu, Estonia	Clay	(Lithuania) Joana Eidukonytė	2–6, 3–6
Loss	6.	29 August 2015	ITF Caslano, Switzerland	Clay	(Italy) Georgia Brescia	4–6, 1–6

=== Doubles: 53 (35–18) ===
Legend $100,000 tournaments $60,000 tournaments $25,000 tournaments $10/15,000 tournaments	Finals by surface Hard (10–8) Clay (25–10)

Result	No.	Date	Tier	Tournament	Surface	Partner	Opponents	Score
Loss	1.	8 October 2010	10,000	ITF Cagliari, Italy	Clay	(Denmark) Mai Grage	(Italy) Elisa Salis (Italy) Valentina Sulpizio	w/o
Loss	2.	16 October 2010	10,000	ITF Bol, Croatia	Clay	(Slovenia) Anja Prislan	(Poland) Katarzyna Kawa (Poland) Natalia Kołat	7–5, 4–6, [8–10]
Win	1.	12 November 2010	10,000	ITF Mallorca, Spain	Clay	(Netherlands) Marcella Koek	(Italy) Benedetta Davato (Italy) Federica Quercia	6–3, 6–2
Win	2.	29 April 2011	10,000	ITF Zell am Harmersbach, Germany	Clay	(Netherlands) Marcella Koek	(Germany) Désirée Schelenz (Germany) Christina Shakovets	6–1, 6–4
Win	3.	24 June 2011	10,000	ITF Breda, Netherlands	Clay	(Australia) Karolina Wlodarczak	(Netherlands) Kim Kilsdonk (Netherlands) Nicolette van Uitert	6–2, 6–4
Win	4.	7 July 2011	10,000	ITF Brussels, Belgium	Clay	(Netherlands) Marcella Koek	(Belgium) Els Callens (Belgium) Nancy Feber	7–5, 3–6, [10–5]
Win	5.	29 July 2011	10,000	ITF Maaseik, Belgium	Clay	(Netherlands) Marcella Koek	(Netherlands) Kim Kilsdonk (Netherlands) Nicolette van Uitert	7–5, 6–1
Win	6.	5 November 2011	10,000	ITF Sunderland, United Kingdom	Hard (i)	(United States) Caitlin Whoriskey	(Czech Republic) Martina Borecká (Czech Republic) Petra Krejsová	6–2, 4–6, [10–8]
Win	7.	19 November 2011	10,000	ITF Équeurdreville, France	Hard (i)	(Belgium) Elyne Boeykens	(France) Elixane Lechemia (Croatia) Silvia Njirić	6–4, 6–4
Win	8.	18 February 2012	10,000	ITF Tallinn, Estonia	Hard (i)	(Slovakia) Lucia Butkovská	(Belarus) Darya Lebesheva (Russia) Julia Valetova	6–4, 7–6^{(7)}
Win	9.	4 May 2012	10,000	ITF Edinburgh, United Kingdom	Clay	(Australia) Karolina Wlodarczak	(France) Elixane Lechemia (Czech Republic) Martina Přádová	4–6, 6–0, [13–11]
Win	10.	11 August 2012	10,000	ITF Pirot, Serbia	Clay	(Romania) Raluca Elena Platon	(Bulgaria) Dalia Zafirova (North Macedonia) Lina Gjorcheska	6–2, 1–6, [10–8]
Loss	3.	26 April 2013	10,000	ITF Ashkelon, Israel	Hard	(Germany) Alina Wessel	(Israel) Deniz Khazaniuk (Russia) Ksenia Kirillova	0–6, 4–6
Win	11.	14 July 2013	25,000	ITF Aschaffenburg, Germany	Clay	(Netherlands) Demi Schuurs	(Germany) Carolin Daniels (Germany) Laura Schaeder	7–5, 1–6, [14–12]
Win	12.	25 July 2013	10,000	ITF Maaseik, Belgium	Clay	(Netherlands) Demi Schuurs	(Netherlands) Bernice van de Velde (Netherlands) Kelly Versteeg	6–2, 4–6, [10–7]
Loss	4.	7 September 2013	25,000	ITF Alphen a/d Rijn, Netherlands	Clay	(Netherlands) Demi Schuurs	(Netherlands) Cindy Burger (Chile) Daniela Seguel	4–6, 1–6
Win	13.	27 September 2013	10,000	ITF Varna, Bulgaria	Clay	(Romania) Raluca Elena Platon	(Belgium) Michaela Boev (Romania) Camelia Hristea	6–3, 6–4
Win	14.	5 October 2013	10,000	ITF Albena, Bulgaria	Clay	(Bulgaria) Dalia Zafirova	(North Macedonia) Lina Gjorcheska (Romania) Camelia Hristea	4–6, 6–2, [10–8]
Win	15.	11 October 2013	10,000	ITF Ruse, Bulgaria	Clay	(Romania) Irina Bara	(North Macedonia) Lina Gjorcheska (Romania) Camelia Hristea	6–1, 6–2
Loss	5.	8 November 2013	25,000	ITF Équeurdreville, France	Hard (i)	(Latvia) Diāna Marcinkēviča	(Switzerland) Timea Bacsinszky (Germany) Kristina Barrois	4–6, 3–6
Loss	6.	15 November 2013	10,000	ITF Manchester, United Kingdom	Hard (i)	(Germany) Julia Wachaczyk	(United Kingdom) Jocelyn Rae (United Kingdom) Anna Smith	1–6, 4–6
Win	16.	13 December 2013	25,000	ITF Madrid, Spain	Hard	(Netherlands) Demi Schuurs	(Bulgaria) Elitsa Kostova (Russia) Evgeniya Rodina	6–1, 6–2
Loss	7.	28 June 2014	15,000	ITF Breda, Netherlands	Clay	(Netherlands) Demi Schuurs	(Russia) Natela Dzalamidze (Belarus) Sviatlana Pirazhenka	4–6, 1–6
Win	17.	29 August 2014	10,000	ITF Caslano, Switzerland	Clay	(Australia) Alexandra Nancarrow	(Italy) Angelica Moratelli (Switzerland) Lisa Sabino	6–0, 6–3
Win	18.	6 September 2014	25,000	ITF Alphen a/d Rijn, Netherlands	Clay	(Sweden) Rebecca Peterson	(Netherlands) Richèl Hogenkamp (Netherlands) Lesley Kerkhove	6–4, 6–4
Win	19.	17 January 2015	10,000	ITF Sharm El Sheikh, Egypt	Hard	(Austria) Pia König	(Italy) Camilla Rosatello (Japan) Yuuki Tanaka	4–6, 7–6^{(2)}, [10–5]
Loss	8.	30 January 2015	10,000	ITF Aktobe, Kazakhstan	Hard (i)	(Kyrgyzstan) Ksenia Palkina	(Uzbekistan) Polina Merenkova (Uzbekistan) Albina Khabibulina	2–6, 6–7
Loss	9.	22 February 2015	10,000	ITF Port El Kantaoui, Tunisia	Hard	(Spain) Arabela Fernández Rabener	(France) Tessah Andrianjafitrimo (Russia) Anna Blinkova	4–6, 0–6
Win	20.	27 February 2015	10,000	ITF Mâcon, France	Hard (i)	(Bulgaria) Isabella Shinikova	(France) Kinnie Laisné (France) Marine Partaud	6–4, 3–6, [10–5]
Win	21.	20 March 2015	10,000	ITF Oslo, Norway	Hard (i)	(Poland) Justyna Jegiołka	(Croatia) Jana Fett (Croatia) Adrijana Lekaj	6–1, 6–1
Win	22.	20 June 2015	10,000	ITF Sharm El Sheikh, Egypt	Hard	(India) Rishika Sunkara	(Spain) Olga Parres Azcoitia (India) Prarthana Thombare	6–1, 6–1
Win	23.	27 June 2015	10,000	ITF Sharm El Sheikh, Egypt	Hard	(India) Prarthana Thombare	(Egypt) Ola Abou Zekry (Greece) Eleni Kordolaimi	6–4, 7–6^{(5)}
Win	24.	1 August 2015	10,000	ITF Pärnu, Estonia	Clay	(Norway) Emma Flood	(Lithuania) Joana Eidukonytė (United Kingdom) Helen Parish	6–4, 6–2
Win	25.	21 August 2015	15,000	ITF Wanfercée-Baulet, Belgium	Clay	(Netherlands) Quirine Lemoine	(Belgium) Elyne Boeykens (Bulgaria) Aleksandrina Naydenova	2–6, 6–2, [10–6]
Win	26.	28 August 2015	10,000	ITF Caslano, Switzerland	Clay	(France) Carla Touly	(Switzerland) Chiara Grimm (Switzerland) Nina Stadler	3–6, 6–3, [10–5]
Win	27.	12 September 2015	25,000	ITF Alphen a/d Rijn, Netherlands	Clay	(Netherlands) Quirine Lemoine	(Netherlands) Lesley Kerkhove (Netherlands) Arantxa Rus	3–6, 6–4, [10–7]
Loss	10.	2 October 2015	25,000	ITF Clermont-Ferrand, France	Hard (i)	(Belgium) Elyne Boeykens	(Russia) Anastasiya Komardina (Serbia) Nina Stojanović	2–6, 1–6
Win	28.	17 June 2016	25,000	Open de Montpellier, France	Clay	(India) Prarthana Thombare	(Spain) Lourdes Domínguez Lino (Switzerland) Jil Teichmann	7–5, 2–6, [11–9]
Win	29.	2 July 2016	25,000	ITF Middelburg, Netherlands	Clay	(Netherlands) Quirine Lemoine	(Greece) Valentini Grammatikopoulou (Germany) Julia Wachaczyk	6–3, 7–5
Loss	11.	20 August 2016	25,000	ITF Westende, Belgium	Hard	(Netherlands) Quirine Lemoine	(Belgium) Elyne Boeykens (Greece) Valentini Grammatikopoulou	2–6, 3–6
Loss	12.	11 November 2016	25,000	ITF Bratislava, Slovakia	Hard (i)	(Netherlands) Quirine Lemoine	(United Kingdom) Jocelyn Rae (United Kingdom) Anna Smith	3–6, 2–6
Loss	13.	1 April 2017	25,000	ITF Pula, Italy	Clay	(India) Prarthana Thombare	(North Macedonia) Lina Gjorcheska (United States) Bernarda Pera	2–6, 3–6
Win	30.	22 April 2017	25,000	ITF Pula, Italy	Clay	(India) Ankita Raina	(Spain) Irene Burillo (Spain) Yvonne Cavallé Reimers	6–4, 6–4
Loss	14.	23 June 2017	25,000	ITF Ystad, Sweden	Clay	(Netherlands) Quirine Lemoine	(Russia) Valentyna Ivakhnenko (Mexico) Renata Zarazúa	3–6, 6–3, [5–10]
Loss	15.	8 July 2017	60,000	ATV di Roma, Italy	Clay	(Netherlands) Quirine Lemoine	(Russia) Anastasiya Komardina (Argentina) Nadia Podoroska	6–7^{(3)}, 3–6
Win	31.	26 August 2017	25,000	Hódmezővásárhely Open, Hungary	Clay	(Romania) Elena-Gabriela Ruse	(Italy) Martina di Giuseppe (Italy) Anna-Giulia Remondina	6–3, 6–1
Win	32.	9 February 2018	25,000	Open de l'Isère, France	Hard (i)	(Switzerland) Amra Sadiković	(France) Estelle Cascino (France) Elixane Lechemia	4–6, 6–1, [10–6]
Win	33.	25 March 2018	25,000	ITF Pula, Italy	Clay	(Slovakia) Chantal Škamlová	(Georgia (country)) Sofia Shapatava (Ukraine) Anastasiya Vasylyeva	6–1, 5–7, [10–6]
Loss	16.	6 July 2018	25,000	Open Denain, France	Clay	(Netherlands) Quirine Lemoine	(Japan) Momoko Kobori (Japan) Ayano Shimizu	6–0, 5–7, [7–10]
Loss	17.	15 July 2018	100,000	Contrexéville Open, France	Clay	(India) Prarthana Thombare	(Belgium) An-Sophie Mestach (China) Zheng Saisai	6–3, 2–6, [7–10]
Win	34.	17 August 2018	25,000	ITF Las Palmas, Spain	Clay	(Netherlands) Quirine Lemoine	(United Kingdom) Emily Arbuthnott (Sweden) Mirjam Björklund	7–6^{(6)}, 6–1
Win	35.	23 June 2019	25,000	Open de Montpellier, France	Clay	(Russia) Marina Melnikova	(Uzbekistan) Albina Khabibulina (Germany) Julia Wachaczyk	4–6, 6–4, [10–3]
Loss	18.	14 July 2019	100,000	Contrexéville Open, France	Clay	(Kazakhstan) Anna Danilina	(Spain) Georgina García Pérez (Georgia (country)) Oksana Kalashnikova	3–6, 3–6
