= 2023 Internazionali Femminili di Palermo =

- Date: 17–23 July
- Edition: 31st
- Category: International
- Draw: 32S / 16D
- Surface: Clay / outdoor
- Location: Palermo, Italy
- Venue: Country Time Club

Champions

Singles
- (China) Zheng Qinwen

Doubles
- Yana Sizikova / (Belgium) Kimberley Zimmermann
← 2022 ·	Internazionali Femminili di Palermo	· 2024 →

The 2023 Internazionali Femminili di Palermo (or Palermo Ladies Open) was a professional women's tennis tournament played on outdoor clay courts at the Country Time Club. It was the 31st edition of the tournament and part of the 2023 WTA Tour. It took place in Palermo, Italy, between 17 and 23 July 2023.

== Finals ==
=== Singles ===
(China) Zheng Qinwen defeated (Italy) Jasmine Paolini, 6–4, 1–6, 6–1

- It was Zheng's maiden WTA Tour singles title.

=== Doubles ===
- Yana Sizikova / (Belgium) Kimberley Zimmermann defeated (Italy) Angelica Moratelli / (Italy) Camilla Rosatello, 6–2, 6–4

== Singles main draw entrants ==
=== Seeds ===
Country	Player	Rank^{1}	Seed
	Daria Kasatkina	10	1
CHN	Zheng Qinwen	25	2
EGY	Mayar Sherif	31	3
ITA	Elisabetta Cocciaretto	43	4
ITA	Jasmine Paolini	44	5
ITA	Lucia Bronzetti	47	6
USA	Emma Navarro	55	7
AUT	Julia Grabher	58	8

- ^{†} Rankings are as of 3 July 2023

=== Other entrants ===
The following players received wildcards into the main draw:

- (France) Fiona Ferro
- (Italy) Camilla Rosatello
- (China) Zheng Qinwen

The following players received entry from the qualifying draw:

- (France) Tessah Andrianjafitrimo
- (Italy) Nuria Brancaccio
- Tatiana Prozorova
- (Serbia) Mia Ristić
- (Netherlands) Eva Vedder
- (Italy) Aurora Zantedeschi

The following players received entry as lucky losers:

- (Malta) Francesca Curmi
- Sofya Lansere

=== Withdrawals ===
- (Germany) Anna-Lena Friedsam → replaced by (Malta) Francesca Curmi
- (United States) Elizabeth Mandlik → replaced by Sofya Lansere
- (United States) Alycia Parks → replaced by (Switzerland) Viktorija Golubic
- (Ukraine) Elina Svitolina → replaced by (Ukraine) Dayana Yastremska
- (Australia) Ajla Tomljanović → replaced by Erika Andreeva

== Doubles main draw entrants ==
=== Seeds ===
Country	Player	Country	Player	Rank^{1}	Seed
	Yana Sizikova	BEL	Kimberley Zimmermann	90	1
EST	Ingrid Neel	TPE	Wu Fang-hsien	114	2
ESP	Cristina Bucșa	NED	Bibiane Schoofs	172	3
VEN	Andrea Gámiz	NED	Eva Vedder	198	4

- ^{†} Rankings are as of 3 July 2023

=== Withdrawals ===
- (Germany) Anna-Lena Friedsam / (Netherlands) Arantxa Rus → replaced by (Uzbekistan) Nigina Abduraimova / Sofya Lansere
- (India) Ankita Raina / (India) Prarthana Thombare → replaced by (Italy) Sara Errani / (Italy) Jasmine Paolini
