= 2024 Palermo Ladies Open =

- Date: 15–21 July
- Edition: 32nd
- Category: WTA 250
- Draw: 32S / 16D
- Prize money: US$267,082
- Surface: Clay / outdoor
- Location: Palermo, Italy
- Venue: Country Time Club

Champions

Singles
- (China) Zheng Qinwen

Doubles
- Alexandra Panova / Yana Sizikova
← 2023 ·	Palermo Ladies Open	· 2025 →

The 2024 Palermo Ladies Open was a professional women's tennis tournament played on outdoor clay courts at the Country Time Club. It was the 32nd edition of the tournament and part of the 2024 WTA Tour. It took place in Palermo, Italy, between 15 and 21 July 2024.

== Finals ==
=== Singles ===
- (China) Zheng Qinwen def. (Czech Republic) Karolína Muchová, 6–4, 4–6, 6–2

=== Doubles ===
- Alexandra Panova / Yana Sizikova def. (Spain) Yvonne Cavallé Reimers / (Italy) Aurora Zantedeschi 4–6, 6–3, [10–5]

== Singles main draw entrants ==
=== Seeds ===
Country	Player	Rank^{1}	Seed
CHN	Zheng Qinwen	8	1
CZE	Karolína Muchová	34	2
USA	Peyton Stearns	52	3
FRA	Diane Parry	53	4
NED	Arantxa Rus	56	5
	Anna Blinkova	60	6
ROU	Jaqueline Cristian	62	7
GER	Tatjana Maria	63	8

- ^{†} Rankings are as of 1 July 2024

=== Other entrants ===
The following players received wildcards into the main draw:

- (Czech Republic) Karolína Muchová
- (Australia) Ajla Tomljanović
- (China) Zheng Qinwen

The following player received entry using a protected ranking:

- (China) Zheng Saisai

The following players received entry from the qualifying draw:

- (Germany) Mona Barthel
- (Australia) Olivia Gadecki
- (Poland) Katarzyna Kawa
- (Germany) Noma Noha Akugue
- (Serbia) Mia Ristić
- (Switzerland) Jil Teichmann

=== Withdrawals ===
- (United States) Hailey Baptiste → replaced by (Australia) Astra Sharma
- (France) Clara Burel → replaced by (France) Chloé Paquet
- (Italy) Elisabetta Cocciaretto → replaced by (Colombia) Emiliana Arango
- (France) Océane Dodin → replaced by (Spain) Marina Bassols Ribera
- (Ukraine) Elina Svitolina → replaced by Erika Andreeva
- (China) Wang Xinyu → replaced by (Latvia) Darja Semeņistaja
- (China) Yuan Yue → replaced by (Argentina) Julia Riera
- (Mexico) Renata Zarazúa → replaced by (Romania) Irina-Camelia Begu

== Doubles main draw entrants ==
=== Seeds ===
Country	Player	Country	Player	Rank^{1}	Seed
	Alexandra Panova		Yana Sizikova	96	1
SVK	Tereza Mihalíková	GBR	Olivia Nicholls	121	2
ITA	Camilla Rosatello	BEL	Kimberley Zimmermann	166	3
ITA	Angelica Moratelli	USA	Sabrina Santamaria	167	4

- ^{†} Rankings are as of 1 July 2024

=== Other entrants ===
The following pairs received wildcards into the main draw:

- (Italy) Anastasia Abbagnato / (Italy) Giorgia Pedone
- (Spain) Yvonne Cavallé Reimers / (Italy) Aurora Zantedeschi
