= 2024 Palermo Ladies Open – Doubles =

Doubles
- 2024 Palermo Ladies Open

Final
- Champions: Alexandra Panova; Yana Sizikova
- Runners-up: (Spain) Yvonne Cavallé Reimers (Italy) Aurora Zantedeschi
- Score: 4–6, 6–3, [10–5]

Details
- Draw: 16
- Seeds: 4

Events
| Singles | Doubles |
| ← 2023 · | Palermo Ladies Open | · 2025 → |

Alexandra Panova and Yana Sizikova won the doubles title at the 2024 Palermo Ladies Open, defeating Yvonne Cavallé Reimers and Aurora Zantedeschi in the final, 4–6, 6–3, [10–5].

Sizikova and Kimberley Zimmermann were the reigning champions, but chose not to defend their title together. Three-time defending champion Zimmermann partnered Camilla Rosatello, but lost to Latisha Chan and Zhang Shuai in the quarterfinals.

== Seeds ==
1. Alexandra Panova / Yana Sizikova (champions)
2. (Slovakia) Tereza Mihalíková / (United Kingdom) Olivia Nicholls (semifinals)
3. (Italy) Camilla Rosatello / (Belgium) Kimberley Zimmermann (quarterfinals)
4. (Italy) Angelica Moratelli / (United States) Sabrina Santamaria (quarterfinals)

== Draw ==
=== Key ===
- Q = Qualifier
- WC = Wild card
- LL = Lucky loser
- Alt = Alternate
- ITF = ITF entry
- PR = Protected ranking
- SR = Special ranking
- SE = Special exempt
- JE = Junior exempt
- JR = Junior Accelerator Programme entrant
- CO = College Accelerator Programme entrant
- NG = Next Gen Accelerator Program entrant
- w/o = Walkover
- r = Retired
- d = Defaulted

=== Draw ===
First round
1 | A Panova; Y Sizikova | 6 | 7^{7}
(France) C Paquet (Latvia) D Semeņistaja | 4 | 6^{4}
WC | (Italy) A Abbagnato (Italy) G Pedone | 6 | 6
(Netherlands) A Rus (Netherlands) E Vedder | 2 | 4
3 | (Italy) C Rosatello (Belgium) K Zimmermann | 6 | 6
(Argentina) ML Carlé (Argentina) J Riera | 4 | 4
(Chinese Taipei) L Chan (China) S Zhang | 6 | 6
S Lansere; A Tikhonova | 0 | 4
(Italy) L Bronzetti (Australia) O Gadecki
WC | (Spain) Y Cavallé Reimers (Italy) A Zantedeschi | w/o
A Blinkova (France) E Lechemia | 4 | 3
4 | (Italy) A Moratelli (United States) S Santamaria | 6 | 6
(China) S Feng (Kazakhstan) Z Kulambayeva | 1 | 6^{1}
(United States) Q Gleason (Switzerland) C Perrin | 6 | 7^{7}
(Georgia (country)) O Kalashnikova (United Kingdom) S Murray Sharan | 6 | 3 | [7]
2 | (Slovakia) T Mihalíková (United Kingdom) O Nicholls | 2 | 6 | [10]

Quarterfinals
1 | A Panova; Y Sizikova | 6 | 6
WC | (Italy) A Abbagnato (Italy) G Pedone | 2 | 4
3 | (Italy) C Rosatello (Belgium) K Zimmermann | 0 | 5
(Chinese Taipei) L Chan (China) S Zhang | 6 | 7
WC | (Spain) Y Cavallé Reimers (Italy) A Zantedeschi | 6 | 6
4 | (Italy) A Moratelli (United States) S Santamaria | 4 | 3
(United States) Q Gleason (Switzerland) C Perrin | 5 | 3
2 | (Slovakia) T Mihalíková (United Kingdom) O Nicholls | 7 | 6

Semifinals
1 | A Panova; Y Sizikova | 6 | 4 | [13]
(Chinese Taipei) L Chan (China) S Zhang | 4 | 6 | [11]
WC | (Spain) Y Cavallé Reimers (Italy) A Zantedeschi | 6 | 0 | [10]
2 | (Slovakia) T Mihalíková (United Kingdom) O Nicholls | 4 | 6 | [6]

Final
1 | A Panova; Y Sizikova | 4 | 6 | [10]
WC | (Spain) Y Cavallé Reimers (Italy) A Zantedeschi | 6 | 3 | [5]
