= 2018 Advantage Cars Prague Open – Women's singles =

Women's singles
- 2018 Advantage Cars Prague Open

Final
- Champion: (Netherlands) Richèl Hogenkamp
- Runner-up: (Italy) Martina Di Giuseppe
- Score: 6–4, 6–2

Events
| Singles | men | women |
| Doubles | men | women |
- Advantage Cars Prague Open

The women's singles of the 2018 Advantage Cars Prague Open tournament was played on clay in Prague, Czech Republic.

Markéta Vondroušová was the defending champion, but chose not to participate.

Richèl Hogenkamp won the title, defeating Martina Di Giuseppe in the final, 6–4, 6–2.

== Seeds ==
1. (Germany) Mona Barthel (quarterfinals)
2. (Netherlands) Richèl Hogenkamp (champion)
3. (Germany) Tamara Korpatsch (semifinals)
4. (Czech Republic) Tereza Smitková (first round)
5. (Netherlands) Bibiane Schoofs (first round)
6. (Italy) Jasmine Paolini (second round)
7. (Czech Republic) Barbora Krejčíková (second round)
8. (Bulgaria) Elitsa Kostova (quarterfinals)

== Draw ==
Key

- Q = Qualifier
- WC = Wild card
- LL = Lucky loser
- Alt = Alternate
- ITF = ITF entry
- PR = Protected ranking
- SR = Special ranking
- SE = Special exempt
- JE = Junior exempt
- JR = Junior Accelerator Programme entrant
- CO = College Accelerator Programme entrant
- NG = Next Gen Accelerator Program entrant
- w/o = Walkover
- r = Retired
- d = Defaulted

=== Finals ===
Semifinals
WC | (Poland) Iga Świątek | 6 | 0 | 6^{3}
(Italy) Martina Di Giuseppe | 1 | 6 | 7^{7}
3 | (Germany) Tamara Korpatsch | 5 | 3
2 | (Netherlands) Richèl Hogenkamp | 7 | 6

Final
(Italy) Martina Di Giuseppe | 4 | 2
2 | (Netherlands) Richèl Hogenkamp | 6 | 6

=== Top half ===
First round
1 | (Germany) M Barthel | 6 | 6
WC | (Czech Republic) B Štefková | 3 | 2
(Serbia) N Stojanović | 7 | 6
Q | (Sweden) C Lister | 5 | 3
WC | (Poland) I Świątek | 7 | 6
(Norway) U Eikeri | 5 | 2
(Mexico) AS Sánchez | 7^{7} | 2 | 2
6 | (Italy) J Paolini | 6^{2} | 6 | 6
4 | (Czech Republic) T Smitková | 0 | 2
(Italy) A Grymalska | 6 | 6
(Italy) M Di Giuseppe | 6 | 6
LL | (Czech Republic) A Dețiuc | 2 | 4
WC | (Czech Republic) L Hradecká | 7 | 6^{4} | 3
(United States) K Stewart | 5 | 7^{7} | 6
(Romania) A Cadanțu | 6 | 2 | 6
5 | (Netherlands) B Schoofs | 3 | 6 | 2

Second round
1 | (Germany) M Barthel | 6 | 6
(Serbia) N Stojanović | 3 | 4
WC | (Poland) I Świątek | 6 | 6
6 | (Italy) J Paolini | 2 | 1
(Italy) A Grymalska | 6^{3} | 7^{8} | 4
(Italy) M Di Giuseppe | 7^{7} | 6^{6} | 6
(United States) K Stewart | 7^{7} | 7
(Romania) A Cadanțu | 6^{4} | 5

Quarterfinals
1 | (Germany) M Barthel | 2 | 3
WC | (Poland) I Świątek | 6 | 6
(Italy) M Di Giuseppe | 6 | 6
(United States) K Stewart | 3 | 4

Semifinals
WC | (Poland) I Świątek | 6 | 0 | 6^{3}
(Italy) M Di Giuseppe | 1 | 6 | 7^{7}

=== Bottom half ===
First round
7 | (Czech Republic) B Krejčíková | 6 | 6
(Germany) A Zaja | 2 | 0
(Czech Republic) K Muchová | 1 | 7 | 6
(Slovakia) M Hončová | 6 | 5 | 2
(Czech Republic) M Kolodziejová | 0 | 1
(Croatia) T Mrdeža | 6 | 6
WC | (Czech Republic) J Malečková | 3 | 1
3 | (Germany) T Korpatsch | 6 | 6
8 | (Bulgaria) E Kostova | 6 | 4 | 6
(Ukraine) K Zavatska | 2 | 6 | 4
(Chile) D Seguel | 6 | 4 | 6^{11}
Q | (Italy) L Stefanini | 4 | 6 | 7^{13}
Q | (Croatia) T Lukas | 6 | 6
(Belgium) K Zimmermann | 3 | 2
(France) A Hesse | 1 | 0
2 | (Netherlands) R Hogenkamp | 6 | 6

Second round
7 | (Czech Republic) B Krejčíková | 4 | 3
(Czech Republic) K Muchová | 6 | 6
(Croatia) T Mrdeža | 4 | 1
3 | (Germany) T Korpatsch | 6 | 6
8 | (Bulgaria) E Kostova | 6 | 6
Q | (Italy) L Stefanini | 2 | 4
Q | (Croatia) T Lukas | 6 | 2 | 4
2 | (Netherlands) R Hogenkamp | 3 | 6 | 6

Quarterfinals
(Czech Republic) K Muchová
3 | (Germany) T Korpatsch | w/o
8 | (Bulgaria) E Kostova | 6^{5} | 7^{7} | 2
2 | (Netherlands) R Hogenkamp | 7^{7} | 6^{5} | 6

Semifinals
3 | (Germany) T Korpatsch | 5 | 3
2 | (Netherlands) R Hogenkamp | 7 | 6
