= 2018 Advantage Cars Prague Open =

Tennis tournament in the Czech Republic

- Date: 23–29 July
- Edition: 25th (ATP); 14th (ITF)
- Category: ATP Challenger Tour; ITF Women's Circuit
- Prize money: €42,500 (ATP) $80,000 (ITF)
- Surface: Clay
- Location: Prague, Czech Republic
- Venue: I. Czech Lawn Tennis Club

Champions

Men's singles
- (Czech Republic) Lukáš Rosol

Women's singles
- (Netherlands) Richèl Hogenkamp

Men's doubles
- (Belgium) Sander Gillé / (Belgium) Joran Vliegen

Women's doubles
- (Sweden) Cornelia Lister / (Serbia) Nina Stojanović
- Advantage Cars Prague Open

The 2018 Advantage Cars Prague Open, also known as Advantage Cars Prague Open by Sport-Technik Bohemia for sponsorship reasons, was a professional tennis tournament played on outdoor clay courts. It was the 25th (ATP) and fourth (ITF) editions of the tournament and was part of the 2018 ATP Challenger Tour and also of the 2018 ITF Women's Circuit as 14th edition of the tournament. It took place in Prague, Czech Republic, on 23–29 July 2018.

== Men's singles main draw entrants ==
=== Seeds ===
Country	Player	Rank^{1}	Seed
GER	Yannick Maden	132	1
BRA	Rogério Dutra Silva	138	2
GER	Mats Moraing	149	3
ESP	Enrique López Pérez	154	4
CZE	Adam Pavlásek	158	5
HUN	Attila Balázs	160	6
GER	Oscar Otte	183	7
ESP	Pedro Martínez	190	8

- ^{1} Rankings are as of 16 July 2018.

=== Other entrants ===
The following players received wildcards into the singles main draw:

- (Czech Republic) Marek Podlešák
- (Czech Republic) Patrik Rikl
- (Czech Republic) Jan Šátral
- (Slovakia) Dominik Šproch

The following players received entry into the singles main draw as special exempts:

- (Germany) Daniel Brands
- (Austria) Jurij Rodionov

The following players received entry from the qualifying draw:

- (Slovakia) Filip Horanský
- (Czech Republic) Pavel Nejedlý
- (Germany) Marc Sieber
- (Netherlands) Tim van Rijthoven

== Women's singles main draw entrants ==
=== Seeds ===
Country	Player	Rank^{1}	Seed
GER	Mona Barthel	115	1
NED	Richèl Hogenkamp	156	2
GER	Tamara Korpatsch	158	3
CZE	Tereza Smitková	165	4
NED	Bibiane Schoofs	174	5
ITA	Jasmine Paolini	180	6
CZE	Barbora Krejčíková	183	7
BUL	Elitsa Kostova	186	8

- ^{1} Rankings as of 16 July 2018.

=== Other entrants ===
The following players received a wildcard into the singles main draw:

- (Czech Republic) Lucie Hradecká
- (Czech Republic) Jesika Malečková
- (Czech Republic) Barbora Štefková
- (Poland) Iga Świątek

The following players received entry from the qualifying draw:

- (Sweden) Cornelia Lister
- (Croatia) Tena Lukas
- (Belgium) ~~An-Sophie Mestach~~
- (Italy) Lucrezia Stefanini

The following player received entry as a lucky loser:

- (Czech Republic) Anastasia Dețiuc

== Champions ==
=== Men's singles ===
- (Czech Republic) Lukáš Rosol def. (Kazakhstan) Aleksandr Nedovyesov 4–6, 6–3, 6–4.

=== Women's singles ===
- (Netherlands) Richèl Hogenkamp def. (Italy) Martina Di Giuseppe, 6–4, 6–2

=== Men's doubles ===
- (Belgium) Sander Gillé / (Belgium) Joran Vliegen def. (Brazil) Fernando Romboli / (Spain) David Vega Hernández 6–4, 6–2.

=== Women's doubles ===
- (Sweden) Cornelia Lister / (Serbia) Nina Stojanović def. (Netherlands) Bibiane Schoofs / (Belgium) Kimberley Zimmermann, 6–2, 2–6, [10–8]
