= 2023 Internazionali Femminili di Palermo – Singles =

Singles
- 2023 Internazionali Femminili di Palermo

Final
- Champion: (China) Zheng Qinwen
- Runner-up: (Italy) Jasmine Paolini
- Score: 6–4, 1–6, 6–1

Details
- Draw: 32
- Seeds: 8

Events
Singles	Doubles
← 2022 ·	Internazionali Femminili di Palermo	· 2024 →

Zheng Qinwen defeated Jasmine Paolini in the final, 6–4, 1–6, 6–1 to win the singles tennis title at the 2023 Internazionali Femminili di Palermo. It was Zheng's first WTA Tour singles title, and she was the first Chinese player to win the singles title at Palermo.

Irina-Camelia Begu was the reigning champion, but she chose to compete at the WTA 125 event in Iași instead.

== Seeds ==
1. Daria Kasatkina (quarterfinals)
2. (China) Zheng Qinwen (champion)
3. (Egypt) Mayar Sherif (semifinals)
4. (Italy) Elisabetta Cocciaretto (first round)
5. (Italy) Jasmine Paolini (final)
6. (Italy) Lucia Bronzetti (first round)
7. (United States) Emma Navarro (quarterfinals)
8. (Austria) Julia Grabher (first round)

== Draw ==
=== Key ===
- Q = Qualifier
- WC = Wild card
- LL = Lucky loser
- Alt = Alternate
- SE = Special exempt
- PR = Protected ranking
- ITF = ITF entry
- JE = Junior exempt
- w/o = Walkover
- r = Retired
- d = Defaulted
- SR = Special ranking

=== Finals ===
Semifinals
5	(Italy) Jasmine Paolini	7^{8}	6
(Spain) Sara Sorribes Tormo	6^{6}	0
3	(Egypt) Mayar Sherif	4	6	1
2/WC	(China) Zheng Qinwen	6	4	6

Final
5	(Italy) Jasmine Paolini	4	6	1
2/WC	(China) Zheng Qinwen	6	1	6

=== Top half ===
First round
1	D Kasatkina	6	6^{2}	6
(Italy) M Trevisan	3	7^{7}	0
(Uzbekistan) N Abduraimova	3	4
Q	T Prozorova	6	6
Q	(Serbia) M Ristić	4	2
(Ukraine) D Yastremska	6	6
(Netherlands) A Rus	4	7	2
5	(Italy) J Paolini	6	5	6
4	(Italy) E Cocciaretto	3	6	0
(Spain) S Sorribes Tormo	6	4	6
Q	(France) T Andrianjafitrimo	3	4
Q	(Italy) N Brancaccio	6	6
(Spain) C Bucșa	3	6	7
LL	(Malta) F Curmi	6	3	5
(France) C Burel	6	7
8	(Austria) J Grabher	4	5

Second round
1	D Kasatkina	6	6
Q	T Prozorova	3	1
(Ukraine) D Yastremska	6	4	2
5	(Italy) J Paolini	2	6	6
(Spain) S Sorribes Tormo	6	6
Q	(Italy) N Brancaccio	3	2
(Spain) C Bucșa	2	4
(France) C Burel	6	6

Quarterfinals
1	D Kasatkina	4	6	3
5	(Italy) J Paolini	6	4	6
(Spain) S Sorribes Tormo	6	7^{8}
(France) C Burel	1	6^{6}

Semifinals
5	(Italy) J Paolini	7^{8}	6
(Spain) S Sorribes Tormo	6^{6}	0

=== Bottom half ===
First round
6	(Italy) L Bronzetti	6	0	2
E Andreeva	4	6	6
(Colombia) C Osorio	7^{7}	6
WC	(France) F Ferro	6^{2}	1
(Serbia) O Danilović	3	0^{r}
LL	S Lansere	6	0
(Spain) J Bouzas Maneiro	6	6^{6}	5
3	(Egypt) M Sherif	3	7^{8}	7
7	(United States) E Navarro	7^{7}	6
Q	(Netherlands) E Vedder	6^{5}	1
WC	(Italy) C Rosatello	6	6
(Switzerland) V Golubic	1	1
(France) D Parry	6	6
Q	(Italy) A Zantedeschi	4	3
(Italy) S Errani	0	0
2/WC	(China) Q Zheng	6	6

Second round
E Andreeva	7^{7}	0	2
(Colombia) C Osorio	6^{3}	6	6
LL	S Lansere	3	3
3	(Egypt) M Sherif	6	6
7	(United States) E Navarro	6	6
WC	(Italy) C Rosatello	2	1
(France) D Parry	5	6	3
2/WC	(China) Q Zheng	7	3	6

Quarterfinals
(Colombia) C Osorio	4	1
3	(Egypt) M Sherif	6	6
7	(United States) E Navarro	4	2
2/WC	(China) Q Zheng	6	6

Semifinals
3	(Egypt) M Sherif	4	6	1
2/WC	(China) Q Zheng	6	4	6

== Qualifying ==
=== Seeds ===
1. (Italy) Nuria Brancaccio (qualified)
2. (Ukraine) Katarina Zavatska (first round)
3. (United States) Hailey Baptiste (first round)
4. Tatiana Prozorova (qualified)
5. (Turkey) Çağla Büyükakçay (first round)
6. (Burundi) Sada Nahimana (first round)
7. (Netherlands) Suzan Lamens (first round)
8. (Italy) Matilde Paoletti (withdrew)
9. (Netherlands) Eva Vedder (qualified)
10. (Malta) Francesca Curmi (qualifying competition, lucky loser)
11. Sofya Lansere (qualifying competition, lucky loser)
12. (Italy) Martina Colmegna (qualifying competition)

=== Qualifiers ===
1. (Italy) Nuria Brancaccio
2. (France) Tessah Andrianjafitrimo
3. (Netherlands) Eva Vedder
4. Tatiana Prozorova
5. (Serbia) Mia Ristić
6. (Italy) Aurora Zantedeschi

=== Lucky losers ===
1. (Malta) Francesca Curmi
2. Sofya Lansere

=== Qualifying draw ===
==== First qualifier ====
First round
1	(Italy) Nuria Brancaccio	6	6
(United States) Quinn Gleason	2	0
WC	(Italy) Gaia Greco	4	4
Alt	(Italy) Deborah Chiesa	6	6

Qualifying competition
1	(Italy) Nuria Brancaccio	6	6
Alt	(Italy) Deborah Chiesa	1	2

==== Second qualifier ====
First round
2	(Ukraine) Katarina Zavatska	4	1
(France) Tessah Andrianjafitrimo	6	6
WC	(Italy) Giada Di Paola	0	0
10	(Malta) Francesca Curmi	6	6

Qualifying competition
(France) Tessah Andrianjafitrimo	6	3	7
10	(Malta) Francesca Curmi	4	6	5

==== Third qualifier ====
First round
3	(United States) Hailey Baptiste	1	6	2
(Italy) Dalila Spiteri	6	2	6
WC	(Kazakhstan) Zara Darken	2	1
9	(Netherlands) Eva Vedder	6	6

Qualifying competition
(Italy) Dalila Spiteri	2	6^{7}
9	(Netherlands) Eva Vedder	6	7^{9}

==== Fourth qualifier ====
First round
4	Tatiana Prozorova	6	7
(Italy) Angelica Moratelli	4	5
(Venezuela) Andrea Gámiz	6^{1}	1
11	Sofya Lansere	7^{7}	6

Qualifying competition
4	Tatiana Prozorova	6	3	6
11	Sofya Lansere	1	6	2

==== Fifth qualifier ====
First round
5	(Turkey) Çağla Büyükakçay	7^{7}	6^{8}	5
(Serbia) Mia Ristić	6^{4}	7^{10}	7
(Liechtenstein) Kathinka von Deichmann	6	7^{7}
7	(Netherlands) Suzan Lamens	3	6^{4}

Qualifying competition
(Serbia) Mia Ristić	1	7^{7}	7^{7}
(Liechtenstein) Kathinka von Deichmann	6	6^{2}	6^{3}

==== Sixth qualifier ====
First round
6	(Burundi) Sada Nahimana	4	6	0
WC	(Italy) Aurora Zantedeschi	6	3	6
(Germany) Stephanie Wagner	4	2
12	(Italy) Martina Colmegna	6	6

Qualifying competition
WC	(Italy) Aurora Zantedeschi	6	6
12	(Italy) Martina Colmegna	0	3
