= 2024 Palermo Ladies Open – Singles =

Singles
- 2024 Palermo Ladies Open

Final
- Champion: (China) Zheng Qinwen
- Runner-up: (Czech Republic) Karolína Muchová
- Score: 6–4, 4–6, 6–2

Details
- Draw: 32
- Seeds: 8

Events
Singles	Doubles
← 2023 ·	Palermo Ladies Open	· 2025 →

Defending champion Zheng Qinwen won the singles title at the 2024 Palermo Ladies Open, defeating Karolína Muchová in the final, 6–4, 4–6, 6–2.

== Seeds ==
1. (China) Zheng Qinwen (champion)
2. (Czech Republic) Karolína Muchová (final)
3. (United States) Peyton Stearns (first round)
4. (France) Diane Parry (semifinals)
5. (Netherlands) Arantxa Rus (second round)
6. Anna Blinkova (first round)
7. (Romania) Jaqueline Cristian (quarterfinals)
8. (Germany) Tatjana Maria (first round)

== Draw ==
=== Key ===
- Q = Qualifier
- WC = Wild card
- LL = Lucky loser
- Alt = Alternate
- ITF = ITF entry
- PR = Protected ranking
- SR = Special ranking
- SE = Special exempt
- JE = Junior exempt
- JR = Junior Accelerator Programme entrant
- CO = College Accelerator Programme entrant
- NG = Next Gen Accelerator Program entrant
- w/o = Walkover
- r = Retired
- d = Defaulted

=== Finals ===
Semifinals
1/WC	(China) Zheng Qinwen	7	6
4	(France) Diane Parry	5	4
(Romania) Irina-Camelia Begu	1	1
2/WC	(Czech Republic) Karolína Muchová	6	6

Final
1/WC	(China) Zheng Qinwen	6	4	6
2/WC	(Czech Republic) Karolína Muchová	4	6	2

=== Top half ===
First round
1/WC	(China) Q Zheng	6	6
(Italy) S Errani	3	2
(Colombia) E Arango	2	3
(Croatia) P Martić	6	6
(Italy) L Bronzetti	7	3	6
(France) E Jacquemot	5	6	3
(Argentina) J Riera	3	2
7	(Romania) J Cristian	6	6
4	(France) D Parry	4	6	6
Q	(Australia) O Gadecki	6	4	4
Q	(Switzerland) J Teichmann	6	6
Q	(Serbia) M Ristić	1	1
(France) C Paquet	6	6
PR	(China) S Zheng	3	3
(Argentina) ML Carlé	5	6	6
8	(Germany) T Maria	7	1	1

Second round
1/WC	(China) Q Zheng	6	6
(Croatia) P Martić	4	4
(Italy) L Bronzetti	3	2
7	(Romania) J Cristian	6	6
4	(France) D Parry	6	6^{4}	6
Q	(Switzerland) J Teichmann	2	7^{7}	2
(France) C Paquet	6	6
(Argentina) ML Carlé	3	1

Quarterfinals
1/WC	(China) Q Zheng	6	6
7	(Romania) J Cristian	1	1
4	(France) D Parry	7	1	6
(France) C Paquet	5	6	4

Semifinals
1/WC	(China) Q Zheng	7	6
4	(France) D Parry	5	4

=== Bottom half ===
First round
5	(Netherlands) A Rus	6^{5}	6	6
(Italy) M Trevisan	7^{7}	4	2
(Romania) I-C Begu	6	6
(Spain) M Bassols Ribera	0	0
E Andreeva	6	6
(Latvia) D Semeņistaja	1	2
(United States) A Li	3	7^{9}	6
3	(United States) P Stearns	6	6^{7}	2
6	A Blinkova	0	5
(Australia) A Sharma	6	7
WC	(Australia) A Tomljanović	3	7	6
(Egypt) M Sherif	6	5	3
Q	(Germany) N Noha Akugue	6	2	6
Q	(Germany) M Barthel	4	6	2
Q	(Poland) K Kawa	6^{14}	1^{r}
2/WC	(Czech Republic) K Muchová	7^{16}	5

Second round
5	(Netherlands) A Rus	2	5
(Romania) I-C Begu	6	7
E Andreeva	3	6	4
(United States) A Li	6	4	6
(Australia) A Sharma	6	3	6
WC	(Australia) A Tomljanović	4	6	1
Q	(Germany) N Noha Akugue	7^{7}	2	3
2/WC	(Czech Republic) K Muchová	6^{0}	6	6

Quarterfinals
(Romania) I-C Begu	6	6
(United States) A Li	3	4
(Australia) A Sharma	6^{5}	6^{6}
2/WC	(Czech Republic) K Muchová	7^{7}	7^{8}

Semifinals
(Romania) I-C Begu	1	1
2/WC	(Czech Republic) K Muchová	6	6

== Qualifying ==
=== Seeds ===
1. (France) Fiona Ferro (qualifying competition)
2. (Australia) Olivia Gadecki (qualified)
3. (Germany) Noma Noha Akugue (qualified)
4. Aliona Falei (qualifying competition)
5. (Spain) Leyre Romero Gormaz (first round)
6. (Poland) Katarzyna Kawa (qualified)
7. Anastasia Tikhonova (first round)
8. (United States) Varvara Lepchenko (withdrew)
9. (Germany) Mona Barthel (qualified)
10. (China) You Xiaodi (first round)
11. (United States) Louisa Chirico (qualifying competition)
12. (Switzerland) Jil Teichmann (qualified)

=== Qualifiers ===
1. (Switzerland) Jil Teichmann
2. (Australia) Olivia Gadecki
3. (Germany) Noma Noha Akugue
4. (Germany) Mona Barthel
5. (Serbia) Mia Ristić
6. (Poland) Katarzyna Kawa

=== Qualifying draw ===
==== First qualifier ====
First round
1	(France) Fiona Ferro	6	6
WC	(Italy) Dalila Spiteri	1	1
(Italy) Giorgia Pedone	1	4
12	(Switzerland) Jil Teichmann	6	6

Qualifying competition
1	(France) Fiona Ferro	3	2
12	(Switzerland) Jil Teichmann	6	6

==== Second qualifier ====
First round
2	(Australia) Olivia Gadecki	6	6
(Switzerland) Susan Bandecchi	2	2
(Italy) Camilla Rosatello	6	3	6
10	(China) You Xiaodi	2	6	4

Qualifying competition
2	(Australia) Olivia Gadecki	6	6
(Italy) Camilla Rosatello	1	3

==== Third qualifier ====
First round
3	(Germany) Noma Noha Akugue	7	7
(Liechtenstein) Kathinka von Deichmann	5	5
(Romania) Cristina Dinu	3	2
11	(United States) Louisa Chirico	6	6

Qualifying competition
3	(Germany) Noma Noha Akugue	7	6
11	(United States) Louisa Chirico	5	1

==== Fourth qualifier ====
First round
4	Aliona Falei	1	6	6
WC	(Italy) Aurora Zantedeschi	6	3	3
WC	(Malta) Francesca Curmi	5	1
9	(Germany) Mona Barthel	7	6

Qualifying competition
4	Aliona Falei	3	4
9	(Germany) Mona Barthel	6	6

==== Fifth qualifier ====
First round
5	(Spain) Leyre Romero Gormaz	6	4	4
WC	(Serbia) Mia Ristić	2	6	6
(Italy) Nuria Brancaccio	2	6	6
7	Anastasia Tikhonova	6	0	3

Qualifying competition
WC	(Serbia) Mia Ristić	7^{7}	6
(Italy) Nuria Brancaccio	6^{3}	3

==== Sixth qualifier ====
First round
6	(Poland) Katarzyna Kawa	6	6
(Spain) Irene Burillo Escorihuela	1	3
Sofya Lansere	3	4
Alt	(France) Audrey Albié	6	6

Qualifying competition
6	(Poland) Katarzyna Kawa	7	6
Alt	(France) Audrey Albié	5	3
