= 2018 Advantage Cars Prague Open – Women's doubles =

Women's doubles
- 2018 Advantage Cars Prague Open

Final
- Champions: (Sweden) Cornelia Lister (Serbia) Nina Stojanović
- Runners-up: (Netherlands) Bibiane Schoofs (Belgium) Kimberley Zimmermann
- Score: 6–2, 2–6, [10–8]

Events
| Singles | men | women |
| Doubles | men | women |
- Advantage Cars Prague Open

The women's doubles of the 2018 Advantage Cars Prague Open tournament was played on clay in Prague, Czech Republic.

Anastasia Potapova and Dayana Yastremska were the defending champions, but both players chose not to participate.

Cornelia Lister and Nina Stojanović won the title, defeating Bibiane Schoofs and Kimberley Zimmermann in the final, 6–2, 2–6, [10–8].

== Seeds ==
1. (Sweden) Cornelia Lister / (Serbia) Nina Stojanović (champions)
2. (Czech Republic) Lucie Hradecká / (Netherlands) Michaëlla Krajicek (first round)
3. (Slovakia) Michaela Hončová / (Croatia) Tereza Mrdeža (quarterfinals)
4. (Netherlands) Bibiane Schoofs / (Belgium) Kimberley Zimmermann (final)

== Draw ==
Key

- Q = Qualifier
- WC = Wild card
- LL = Lucky loser
- Alt = Alternate
- ITF = ITF entry
- PR = Protected ranking
- SR = Special ranking
- SE = Special exempt
- JE = Junior exempt
- JR = Junior Accelerator Programme entrant
- CO = College Accelerator Programme entrant
- NG = Next Gen Accelerator Program entrant
- w/o = Walkover
- r = Retired
- d = Defaulted

=== Draw ===
First round
1 | (Sweden) C Lister (Serbia) N Stojanović | 7 | 3 | [10]
(Belgium) A-S Mestach (United States) K Stewart | 5 | 6 | [5]
(Czech Republic) K Muchová (Czech Republic) B Štefková | 6 | 6
WC | (Czech Republic) R Bužková (Czech Republic) A Laboutková | 1 | 4
3 | (Slovakia) M Hončová (Croatia) T Mrdeža | 6 | 4 | [10]
(Czech Republic) J Marková (Czech Republic) M Pantůčková | 2 | 6 | [6]
(Italy) M Di Giuseppe (Italy) A Grymalska | 6 | 6
WC | (United States) N Suk (Czech Republic) K Vaňková | 4 | 1
(Romania) A Cadanțu (Bulgaria) E Kostova | 1 | 3
(Czech Republic) P Krejsová (Czech Republic) J Malečková | 6 | 6
(Russia) Ana Pribylova (Russia) Ann Pribylova | 1 | 3
4 | (Netherlands) B Schoofs (Belgium) K Zimmermann | 6 | 6
(Norway) U Eikeri (Mexico) AS Sánchez | 6 | 7^{8}
(Germany) A Klasen (Austria) P König | 2 | 6^{6}
WC | (Czech Republic) A Dețiuc (Czech Republic) M Kolodziejová | 6 | 5 | [10]
2 | (Czech Republic) L Hradecká (Netherlands) M Krajicek | 3 | 7 | [5]

Quarterfinals
1 | (Sweden) C Lister (Serbia) N Stojanović | 7^{7} | 6
(Czech Republic) K Muchová (Czech Republic) B Štefková | 6^{4} | 2
3 | (Slovakia) M Hončová (Croatia) T Mrdeža | 4 | 2
(Italy) M Di Giuseppe (Italy) A Grymalska | 6 | 6
(Czech Republic) P Krejsová (Czech Republic) J Malečková | 6^{5} | 6 | [5]
4 | (Netherlands) B Schoofs (Belgium) K Zimmermann | 7^{7} | 4 | [10]
(Norway) U Eikeri (Mexico) AS Sánchez | 6^{2} | 3
WC | (Czech Republic) A Dețiuc (Czech Republic) M Kolodziejová | 7^{7} | 6

Semifinals
1 | (Sweden) C Lister (Serbia) N Stojanović | 6 | 7
(Italy) M Di Giuseppe (Italy) A Grymalska | 4 | 5
4 | (Netherlands) B Schoofs (Belgium) K Zimmermann | 6 | 6
WC | (Czech Republic) A Dețiuc (Czech Republic) M Kolodziejová | 1 | 0

Final
1 | (Sweden) C Lister (Serbia) N Stojanović | 6 | 2 | [10]
4 | (Netherlands) B Schoofs (Belgium) K Zimmermann | 2 | 6 | [8]
