= 2022 Internazionali Femminili di Palermo – Doubles =

Doubles
- 2022 Internazionali Femminili di Palermo

Final
- Champions: (Hungary) Anna Bondár (Belgium) Kimberley Zimmermann
- Runners-up: Amina Anshba (Hungary) Panna Udvardy
- Score: 6–3, 6–2

Events
Singles	Doubles
← 2021 ·	Internazionali Femminili di Palermo	· 2023 →

Defending champion Kimberley Zimmermann and her partner, Anna Bondár, defeated Amina Anshba and Panna Udvardy in the final, 6–3, 6–2 to win the doubles tennis title at the 2022 Internazionali Femminili di Palermo. It marked Zimmermann's second career WTA Tour doubles title and Bondár's first in either discipline.

Zimmermann had won the previous edition with Erin Routliffe, who did not return to compete.

== Seeds ==
1. (Chile) Alexa Guarachi / (United States) Asia Muhammad (semifinals)
2. (Kazakhstan) Anna Danilina / (Georgia (country)) Oksana Kalashnikova (quarterfinals)
3. (Hungary) Anna Bondár / (Belgium) Kimberley Zimmermann (champions)
4. (United States) Ingrid Neel / (Czech Republic) Renata Voráčová (first round)

== Draw ==
=== Key ===
- Q = Qualifier
- WC = Wild card
- LL = Lucky loser
- Alt = Alternate
- SE = Special exempt
- PR = Protected ranking
- ITF = ITF entry
- JE = Junior exempt
- w/o = Walkover
- r = Retired
- d = Defaulted
- SR = Special ranking

=== Draw ===
First round
1	(Chile) A Guarachi (United States) A Muhammad	7	6
(Georgia (country)) N Dzalamidze; A Tikhonova	5	4
WC	(Italy) L Pigato (Italy) L Stefanini	2	3
(Venezuela) A Gámiz (Netherlands) E Vedder	6	6
3	(Hungary) A Bondár (Belgium) K Zimmermann	6	6
A Fomina-Klotz; E Yashina	2	0
(Spain) N Párrizas Díaz (Argentina) N Podoroska	5	2
(Indonesia) J Rompies (Australia) O Tjandramulia	7	6
(Brazil) C Alves (Brazil) R Pereira	1	6	[6]
PR	(Czech Republic) A Dețiuc (Poland) P Kania-Choduń	6	3	[10]
A Gabueva; A Zakharova	4	6	[10]
4	(United States) I Neel (Czech Republic) R Voráčová	6	3	[7]
(China) Xiy Wang (China) S Zhang	6	3	[6]
A Anshba (Hungary) P Udvardy	2	6	[10]
Alt	(Australia) J Fourlis (Romania) G Lee	6	4	[2]
2	(Kazakhstan) A Danilina (Georgia (country)) O Kalashnikova	4	6	[10]

Quarterfinals
1	(Chile) A Guarachi (United States) A Muhammad	6	6
(Venezuela) A Gámiz (Netherlands) E Vedder	3	0
3	(Hungary) A Bondár (Belgium) K Zimmermann	6	6
(Indonesia) J Rompies (Australia) O Tjandramulia	1	2
PR	(Czech Republic) A Dețiuc (Poland) P Kania-Choduń	7^{7}	5	[10]
A Gabueva; A Zakharova	6^{3}	7	[6]
A Anshba (Hungary) P Udvardy	7^{7}	5	[10]
2	(Kazakhstan) A Danilina (Georgia (country)) O Kalashnikova	6^{5}	7	[6]

Semifinals
1	(Chile) A Guarachi (United States) A Muhammad	6^{8}	4
3	(Hungary) A Bondár (Belgium) K Zimmermann	7^{10}	6
PR	(Czech Republic) A Dețiuc (Poland) P Kania-Choduń
A Anshba (Hungary) P Udvardy	w/o

Final
3	(Hungary) A Bondár (Belgium) K Zimmermann	6	6
A Anshba (Hungary) P Udvardy	3	2
