= 2022 Internazionali Femminili di Palermo – Singles =

Singles
- 2022 Internazionali Femminili di Palermo

Final
- Champion: (Romania) Irina-Camelia Begu
- Runner-up: (Italy) Lucia Bronzetti
- Score: 6–2, 6–2

Details
- Draw: 32
- Seeds: 8

Events
Singles	Doubles
← 2021 ·	Internazionali Femminili di Palermo	· 2023 →

Irina-Camelia Begu defeated Lucia Bronzetti in the final, 6–2, 6–2 to win the singles tennis title at the 2022 Internazionali Femminili di Palermo. It was her fifth career WTA Tour singles title, her first since 2017. Bronzetti was contesting her first career singles final.

Danielle Collins was the reigning champion, but did not participate.

== Seeds ==
1. (Italy) Martina Trevisan (withdrew)
2. (Kazakhstan) Yulia Putintseva (second round)
3. (China) Zhang Shuai (second round, withdrew)
4. (Spain) Sara Sorribes Tormo (semifinals)
5. (France) Caroline Garcia (quarterfinals)
6. (Romania) Irina-Camelia Begu (champion)
7. (Hungary) Anna Bondár (quarterfinals)
8. (Spain) Nuria Párrizas Díaz (quarterfinals)

== Draw ==
=== Key ===
- Q = Qualifier
- WC = Wild card
- LL = Lucky loser
- Alt = Alternate
- SE = Special exempt
- PR = Protected ranking
- ITF = ITF entry
- JE = Junior exempt
- w/o = Walkover
- r = Retired
- d = Defaulted
- SR = Special ranking

=== Finals ===
Semifinals
(Italy) Lucia Bronzetti	0	6	6
(Italy) Jasmine Paolini	6	3	3
4	(Spain) Sara Sorribes Tormo	6	3	4
6	(Romania) Irina-Camelia Begu	3	6	6

Final
(Italy) Lucia Bronzetti	2	2
6	(Romania) Irina-Camelia Begu	6	6

=== Top half ===
First round
LL	(Brazil) C Alves	2	7	1
Q	E Avanesyan	6	5	6
(Italy) L Bronzetti	6	6
(China) Xiy Wang	3	3
WC	(Italy) S Errani	1	0
WC	(Italy) E Cocciaretto	6	6
(France) C Paquet	7^{7}	2	2
5	(France) C Garcia	6^{2}	6	6
3	(China) S Zhang	7^{7}	7^{9}
Q	(Spain) R Masarova	6^{3}	6^{7}
(Italy) J Paolini	6	6
(Slovakia) AK Schmiedlová	3	1
(China) Xin Wang	3	3
LL	(Austria) J Grabher	6	6
Q	(United States) A Muhammad	6	5	5
8	(Spain) N Párrizas Díaz	4	7	7

Second round
Q	E Avanesyan	1	3
(Italy) L Bronzetti	6	6
WC	(Italy) E Cocciaretto	6	3	4
5	(France) C Garcia	0	6	6
3	(China) S Zhang
(Italy) J Paolini	w/o
LL	(Austria) J Grabher	2	4
8	(Spain) N Párrizas Díaz	6	6

Quarterfinals
(Italy) L Bronzetti	3	7	6
5	(France) C Garcia	6	5	3
(Italy) J Paolini	6^{5}	7	6
8	(Spain) N Párrizas Díaz	7^{7}	5	2

Semifinals
(Italy) L Bronzetti	0	6	6
(Italy) J Paolini	6	3	3

=== Bottom half ===
First round
7	(Hungary) A Bondár	6	6
(France) C Burel	4	4
WC	(Italy) L Stefanini	1	6^{4}
(Hungary) P Udvardy	6	7^{7}
(Switzerland) Y In-Albon	2	4
Q	(France) L Jeanjean	6	6
(Romania) A Bogdan	6	4	2
4	(Spain) S Sorribes Tormo	2	6	6
6	(Romania) I-C Begu	6	4	6
Q	(Spain) M Bassols Ribera	3	6	3
Q	(Italy) M Paoletti	4	5
(France) O Dodin	6	7
(United States) L Davis	6^{5}	2
(France) D Parry	7^{7}	6
LL	(Australia) J Fourlis	3	1
2	(Kazakhstan) Y Putintseva	6	6

Second round
7	(Hungary) A Bondár	6	6
(Hungary) P Udvardy	2	4
Q	(France) L Jeanjean	0	2
4	(Spain) S Sorribes Tormo	6	6
6	(Romania) I-C Begu	1	6	6
(France) O Dodin	6	2	4
(France) D Parry	6	6
2	(Kazakhstan) Y Putintseva	3	4

Quarterfinals
7	(Hungary) A Bondár	2	3
4	(Spain) S Sorribes Tormo	6	6
6	(Romania) I-C Begu	6	6
(France) D Parry	1	3

Semifinals
4	(Spain) S Sorribes Tormo	6	3	4
6	(Romania) I-C Begu	3	6	6

== Qualifying ==
=== Seeds ===
1. (Romania) Ana Bogdan (moved to main draw)
2. (Switzerland) Ylena In-Albon (moved to main draw)
3. Elina Avanesyan (qualified)
4. (Spain) Rebeka Masarova (qualified)
5. (Austria) Julia Grabher (qualifying competition, lucky loser)
6. (Romania) Gabriela Lee (first round)
7. (Australia) Jaimee Fourlis (qualifying competition, lucky loser)
8. (France) Léolia Jeanjean (qualified)
9. Anastasia Zakharova (first round)
10. (United States) Asia Muhammad (qualified)
11. (Brazil) Carolina Alves (qualifying competition, lucky loser)
12. Anastasia Tikhonova (qualifying competition)

=== Qualifiers ===
1. (Spain) Marina Bassols Ribera
2. (United States) Asia Muhammad
3. Elina Avanesyan
4. (Spain) Rebeka Masarova
5. (France) Léolia Jeanjean
6. (Italy) Matilde Paoletti

=== Lucky losers ===
1. (Australia) Jaimee Fourlis
2. (Austria) Julia Grabher
3. (Brazil) Carolina Alves

=== Qualifying draw ===
==== First qualifier ====
First round
Alt	(Spain) Marina Bassols Ribera	6	6
WC	(Italy) Dalila Spiteri	2	3
(Greece) Despina Papamichail	6	6
9	Anastasia Zakharova	4	4

Qualifying competition
Alt	(Spain) Marina Bassols Ribera	6	6
(Greece) Despina Papamichail	2	1

==== Second qualifier ====
First round
Alt	(Brazil) Gabriela Cé	3	3
(United States) Louisa Chirico	6	6
WC	(Italy) Lisa Pigato	6^{5}	2
10	(United States) Asia Muhammad	7^{7}	6

Qualifying competition
(United States) Louisa Chirico
10	(United States) Asia Muhammad	w/o

==== Third qualifier ====
First round
3	Elina Avanesyan	6	7
WC	(Italy) Nuria Brancaccio	4	5
(United States) Francesca Di Lorenzo	5	6	4
11	(Brazil) Carolina Alves	7	2	6

Qualifying competition
3	Elina Avanesyan	6	7
11	(Brazil) Carolina Alves	3	5

==== Fourth qualifier ====
First round
4	(Spain) Rebeka Masarova	6	2	6
(Australia) Seone Mendez	4	6	3
Natalia Vikhlyantseva	4	1
7	(Australia) Jaimee Fourlis	6	6

Qualifying competition
4	(Spain) Rebeka Masarova	5	6	6
7	(Australia) Jaimee Fourlis	7	3	4

==== Fifth qualifier ====
First round
5	(Austria) Julia Grabher	6	6
(Argentina) Nadia Podoroska	4	1
(France) Elsa Jacquemot	4	3
8	(France) Léolia Jeanjean	6	6

Qualifying competition
5	(Austria) Julia Grabher	4	6	2
8	(France) Léolia Jeanjean	6	3	6

==== Sixth qualifier ====
First round
6	(Romania) Gabriela Lee	5	2
WC	(Italy) Matilde Paoletti	7	6
(Italy) Federica Di Sarra	6	5	3
12	Anastasia Tikhonova	2	7	6

Qualifying competition
WC	(Italy) Matilde Paoletti	6	6
12	Anastasia Tikhonova	3	4
