= 2022 Internazionali Femminili di Palermo =

- Date: 18–24 July
- Edition: 30th
- Category: International
- Draw: 32S / 16D
- Prize money: $251,750
- Surface: Clay / outdoor
- Location: Palermo, Italy
- Venue: Country Time Club

Champions

Singles
- (Romania) Irina-Camelia Begu

Doubles
- (Hungary) Anna Bondár / (Belgium) Kimberley Zimmermann
← 2021 ·	Internazionali Femminili di Palermo	· 2023 →

The 2022 Internazionali Femminili di Palermo was a professional women's tennis tournament played on outdoor clay courts at the Country Time Club. It was the 30th edition of the tournament and part of the 2022 WTA Tour. It took place in Palermo, Italy, between 18 and 24 July 2022.

== Finals ==
=== Singles ===
(Romania) Irina-Camelia Begu defeated (Italy) Lucia Bronzetti 6–2, 6–2

- It was Begu's only singles title of the year and the fifth of her career.

=== Doubles ===
- (Hungary) Anna Bondár / (Belgium) Kimberley Zimmermann defeated Amina Anshba / (Hungary) Panna Udvardy 6–3, 6–2.

== Singles main draw entrants ==
=== Seeds ===
Country	Player	Rank^{1}	Seed
~~ITA~~	~~Martina Trevisan~~	~~26~~	~~1~~
KAZ	Yulia Putintseva	32	2
CHN	Zhang Shuai	37	3
ESP	Sara Sorribes Tormo	43	4
FRA	Caroline Garcia	48	5
ROU	Irina-Camelia Begu	49	6
HUN	Anna Bondár	53	7
ESP	Nuria Párrizas Díaz	54	8

- ^{†} Rankings are as of 11 July 2022

=== Other entrants ===
The following players received wildcards into the main draw:

- (Italy) Elisabetta Cocciaretto
- (Italy) Sara Errani
- (Italy) Lucrezia Stefanini

The following player received entry using a protected ranking:

- ~~(Germany) Laura Siegemund~~

The following players received entry from the qualifying draw:

- Elina Avanesyan
- (Spain) Marina Bassols Ribera
- (France) Léolia Jeanjean
- (Spain) Rebeka Masarova
- (United States) Asia Muhammad
- (Italy) Matilde Paoletti

The following player received entry as a lucky loser:

- (Brazil) Carolina Alves
- (Australia) Jaimee Fourlis
- (Austria) Julia Grabher

=== Withdrawals ===
Before the tournament

- (Slovenia) Kaja Juvan → replaced by (Hungary) Panna Udvardy
- (Montenegro) Danka Kovinić → replaced by (Switzerland) Ylena In-Albon
- (Croatia) Petra Martić → replaced by (Australia) Jaimee Fourlis
- (Netherlands) Arantxa Rus → replaced by (Romania) Ana Bogdan
- (Germany) Laura Siegemund → replaced by (Austria) Julia Grabher
- (Australia) Ajla Tomljanović → replaced by (France) Chloé Paquet
- (Italy) Martina Trevisan → replaced by (Brazil) Carolina Alves

During the tournament

- (China) Zhang Shuai

== Doubles main draw entrants ==
=== Seeds ===
Country	Player	Country	Player	Rank^{1}	Seed
CHI	Alexa Guarachi	USA	Asia Muhammad	67	1
KAZ	Anna Danilina	GEO	Oksana Kalashnikova	103	2
HUN	Anna Bondár	BEL	Kimberley Zimmermann	119	3
USA	Ingrid Neel	CZE	Renata Voráčová	207	4

- ^{†} Rankings are as of 11 July 2022

=== Other entrants ===
The following pairs received wildcards into the doubles main draw:

- ~~(Italy) Elisabetta Cocciaretto / (Italy) Camilla Rosatello~~
- (Italy) Lisa Pigato / (Italy) Lucrezia Stefanini

The following pair received entry into the doubles main draw using a special ranking:

- (Czech Republic) Anastasia Dețiuc / (Poland) Paula Kania-Choduń

The following pair received entry as alternates:

- (Australia) Jaimee Fourlis / (Romania) Gabriela Lee

=== Withdrawals ===
- (Georgia (country)) Natela Dzalamidze / (Slovenia) Kaja Juvan → replaced by (Georgia (country)) Natela Dzalamidze / Anastasia Tikhonova
- (Georgia (country)) Ekaterine Gorgodze / (Georgia (country)) Oksana Kalashnikova → replaced by (Kazakhstan) Anna Danilina / (Georgia (country)) Oksana Kalashnikova
- (Germany) Laura Siegemund / (China) Zhang Shuai → replaced by (China) Wang Xiyu / (China) Zhang Shuai
- (Italy) Elisabetta Cocciaretto / (Italy) Camilla Rosatello → replaced by (Australia) Jaimee Fourlis / (Romania) Gabriela Lee
