= 2018 Advantage Cars Prague Open – Men's doubles =

Men's doubles
- 2018 Advantage Cars Prague Open

Final
- Champions: (Belgium) Sander Gillé (Belgium) Joran Vliegen
- Runners-up: (Brazil) Fernando Romboli (Spain) David Vega Hernández
- Score: 6–4, 6–2

Events
Singles	men	women
Doubles	men	women
- Advantage Cars Prague Open

The men's doubles of the 2018 Advantage Cars Prague Open tournament was played on clay in Prague, Czech Republic.

Jan Šátral and Tristan-Samuel Weissborn were the defending champions but only Šátral chose to defend his title, partnering Jan Mertl. Šátral lost in the quarterfinals to Fernando Romboli and David Vega Hernández.

Sander Gillé and Joran Vliegen won the title after defeating Romboli and Vega Hernández 6–4, 6–2 in the final.

== Seeds ==
1. (Belgium) Sander Gillé / (Belgium) Joran Vliegen (champions)
2. (Brazil) Fernando Romboli / (Spain) David Vega Hernández (final)
3. (United States) Nathan Pasha / (United States) Hunter Reese (first round)
4. (Croatia) Tomislav Draganja / (Croatia) Ivan Sabanov (semifinals)

== Draw ==
Key

- Q = Qualifier
- WC = Wild card
- LL = Lucky loser
- Alt = Alternate
- ITF = ITF entry
- PR = Protected ranking
- SR = Special ranking
- SE = Special exempt
- JE = Junior exempt
- JR = Junior Accelerator Programme entrant
- CO = College Accelerator Programme entrant
- NG = Next Gen Accelerator Program entrant
- w/o = Walkover
- r = Retired
- d = Defaulted

First round
1	(Belgium) S Gillé (Belgium) J Vliegen	6^{5}	6	[10]
WC	(Czech Republic) Robin Staněk (Czech Republic) O Štyler	7^{7}	4	[8]
WC	(Slovakia) F Polášek (Czech Republic) P Rikl	7^{7}	7
(Brazil) G Clezar (Portugal) J Domingues	6^{5}	5
3	(United States) N Pasha (United States) H Reese	4	6	[6]
(Czech Republic) M Gengel (Czech Republic) D Kellovský	6	4	[10]
(Czech Republic) Z Kolář (Poland) G Panfil	5	6	[8]
(Slovakia) F Horanský (Australia) S Puodziunas	7	3	[10]
Alt	(Germany) Marc Sieber (Germany) P Torebko	3	2
(Italy) L Giustino (Portugal) G Oliveira	6	6
(Argentina) M Kestelboim (Ukraine) V Uzhylovskyi	7^{11}	2	[7]
4	(Croatia) T Draganja (Croatia) I Sabanov	6^{9}	6	[10]
(Spain) P Martínez (Spain) B Zapata Miralles	1	6	[5]
WC	(Czech Republic) J Mertl (Czech Republic) J Šátral	6	4	[10]
(France) Yanaïs Laurent (France) C Lestienne	3	6^{7}
2	(Brazil) F Romboli (Spain) D Vega Hernández	6	7^{9}

Quarterfinals
1	(Belgium) S Gillé (Belgium) J Vliegen	6	6
WC	(Slovakia) F Polášek (Czech Republic) P Rikl	3	4
(Czech Republic) M Gengel (Czech Republic) D Kellovský	6	7^{7}
(Slovakia) F Horanský (Australia) S Puodziunas	3	6^{2}
(Italy) L Giustino (Portugal) G Oliveira	6^{2}	7^{7}	[11]
4	(Croatia) T Draganja (Croatia) I Sabanov	7^{7}	6^{3}	[13]
WC	(Czech Republic) J Mertl (Czech Republic) J Šátral	4	5
2	(Brazil) F Romboli (Spain) D Vega Hernández	6	7

Semifinals
1	(Belgium) S Gillé (Belgium) J Vliegen	6	6
(Czech Republic) M Gengel (Czech Republic) D Kellovský	4	3
4	(Croatia) T Draganja (Croatia) I Sabanov	6^{3}	3
2	(Brazil) F Romboli (Spain) D Vega Hernández	7^{7}	6

Final
1	(Belgium) S Gillé (Belgium) J Vliegen	6	6
2	(Brazil) F Romboli (Spain) D Vega Hernández	4	2
