= 2023 Internazionali Femminili di Palermo – Doubles =

Doubles
- 2023 Internazionali Femminili di Palermo

Final
- Champions: Yana Sizikova (Belgium) Kimberley Zimmermann
- Runners-up: (Italy) Angelica Moratelli (Italy) Camilla Rosatello
- Score: 6–2, 6–4

Details
- Draw: 15
- Seeds: 4

Events
Singles	Doubles
← 2022 ·	Internazionali Femminili di Palermo	· 2024 →

Two-time defending champion Kimberley Zimmermann and her partner, Yana Sizikova, defeated Angelica Moratelli and Camilla Rosatello in the final.

They won 6–2, 6–4, respectively to win the doubles tennis title at the 2023 Internazionali Femminili di Palermo. It was Zimmermann's third consecutive doubles title in Palermo, all won with different partners.

Anna Bondár and Zimmermann were the reigning champions, but Bondár chose to compete in Budapest instead.

== Seeds ==
The top seed received a bye into the quarterfinals.

1. Yana Sizikova / (Belgium) Kimberley Zimmermann (champions)
2. (Estonia) Ingrid Neel / (Chinese Taipei) Wu Fang-hsien (first round)
3. (Spain) Cristina Bucșa / (Netherlands) Bibiane Schoofs (semifinals)
4. (Venezuela) Andrea Gámiz / (Netherlands) Eva Vedder (first round)

== Draw ==
=== Key ===
- Q = Qualifier
- WC = Wild card
- LL = Lucky loser
- Alt = Alternate
- SE = Special exempt
- PR = Protected ranking
- ITF = ITF entry
- JE = Junior exempt
- w/o = Walkover
- r = Retired
- d = Defaulted
- SR = Special ranking

=== Draw ===
First round
(Italy) N Brancaccio (Italy) G Pedone	5	6^{2}
(Italy) D Spiteri (Italy) A Zantedeschi	7	7^{7}
3	(Spain) C Bucșa (Netherlands) B Schoofs	6	7^{7}
(United Kingdom) E Appleton (Germany) J Lohoff	3	6^{3}
(United States) Q Gleason (France) E Lechemia	6	6
(Colombia) Y Lizarazo (Colombia) MP Pérez García	1	1
(Uzbekistan) N Abduraimova; S Lansere	5	7^{7}	[11]
(Italy) D Chiesa (Italy) M Colmegna	7	6^{5}	[9]
(Italy) S Errani (Italy) J Paolini	6	6
4	(Venezuela) A Gámiz (Netherlands) E Vedder	2	1
(Italy) A Moratelli (Italy) C Rosatello	6	6
(Italy) L Bronzetti (Turkey) Ç Büyükakçay	4	2
A Anshba (Czech Republic) A Dețiuc	6	4	[11]
2	(Estonia) I Neel (Chinese Taipei) F-h Wu	2	6	[9]

Quarterfinals
1	Y Sizikova (Belgium) K Zimmermann	6	6
(Italy) D Spiteri (Italy) A Zantedeschi	3	4
3	(Spain) C Bucșa (Netherlands) B Schoofs	6	6
(United States) Q Gleason (France) E Lechemia	4	2
(Uzbekistan) N Abduraimova; S Lansere	2	4
(Italy) S Errani (Italy) J Paolini	6	6
(Italy) A Moratelli (Italy) C Rosatello	6	6
A Anshba (Czech Republic) A Dețiuc	3	0

Semifinals
1	Y Sizikova (Belgium) K Zimmermann	7^{9}	6
3	(Spain) C Bucșa (Netherlands) B Schoofs	6^{7}	2
(Italy) S Errani (Italy) J Paolini	2	1
(Italy) A Moratelli (Italy) C Rosatello	6	6

Final
1	Y Sizikova (Belgium) K Zimmermann	6	6
(Italy) A Moratelli (Italy) C Rosatello	2	4
