= 2018 Advantage Cars Prague Open – Men's singles =

Men's singles
- 2018 Advantage Cars Prague Open

Final
- Champion: (Czech Republic) Lukáš Rosol
- Runner-up: (Kazakhstan) Aleksandr Nedovyesov
- Score: 4–6, 6–3, 6–4

Events
Singles	men	women
Doubles	men	women
- Advantage Cars Prague Open

The men's singles of the 2018 Advantage Cars Prague Open tournament was played on clay in Prague, Czech Republic.

Andrej Martin was the defending champion but chose not to defend his title.

Lukáš Rosol won the title after defeating Aleksandr Nedovyesov 4–6, 6–3, 6–4 in the final.

== Seeds ==
1. (Germany) Yannick Maden (second round)
2. (Brazil) Rogério Dutra Silva (second round)
3. (Germany) Mats Moraing (quarterfinals)
4. (Spain) Enrique López Pérez (quarterfinals)
5. (Czech Republic) Adam Pavlásek (first round)
6. (Hungary) Attila Balázs (first round)
7. (Germany) Oscar Otte (second round)
8. (Spain) Pedro Martínez (semifinals)

== Draw ==
Key

- Q = Qualifier
- WC = Wild card
- LL = Lucky loser
- Alt = Alternate
- ITF = ITF entry
- PR = Protected ranking
- SR = Special ranking
- SE = Special exempt
- JE = Junior exempt
- JR = Junior Accelerator Programme entrant
- CO = College Accelerator Programme entrant
- NG = Next Gen Accelerator Program entrant
- w/o = Walkover
- r = Retired
- d = Defaulted

=== Finals ===
Semifinals
(Kazakhstan) Aleksandr Nedovyesov	6	6
8	(Spain) Pedro Martínez	3	4
(Czech Republic) Lukáš Rosol	1	6	7^{7}
Q	(Slovakia) Filip Horanský	6	3	6^{5}

Final
(Kazakhstan) Aleksandr Nedovyesov	6	3	4
(Czech Republic) Lukáš Rosol	4	6	6

=== Top half ===
First round
1	(Germany) Y Maden	6	6
(Portugal) G Oliveira	3	3
(Kazakhstan) A Nedovyesov	6	6
Q	(Germany) Marc Sieber	0	4
(Brazil) G Clezar	6	6
SE	(Germany) D Brands	3	1
Q	(Netherlands) T van Rijthoven	6	6^{2}	6
5	(Czech Republic) A Pavlásek	3	7^{7}	3
3	(Germany) M Moraing	7^{8}	2	6
(Czech Republic) Z Kolář	6^{6}	6	3
WC	(Czech Republic) P Rikl	5	7	6
(Russia) I Nedelko	7	5	4
WC	(Czech Republic) Marek Podlešák	1	4
(Netherlands) S Griekspoor	6	6
SE	(Austria) J Rodionov	1	1
8	(Spain) P Martínez	6	6

Second round
1	(Germany) Y Maden	3	5
(Kazakhstan) A Nedovyesov	6	7
(Brazil) G Clezar	6	6^{5}	6
Q	(Netherlands) T van Rijthoven	3	7^{7}	4
3	(Germany) M Moraing	4	6	6
WC	(Czech Republic) P Rikl	6	3	2
(Netherlands) S Griekspoor	6	4	5
8	(Spain) P Martínez	4	6	7

Quarterfinals
(Kazakhstan) A Nedovyesov	6	7^{7}
(Brazil) G Clezar	4	6^{3}
3	(Germany) M Moraing	2	3
8	(Spain) P Martínez	6	6

Semifinals
(Kazakhstan) A Nedovyesov	6	6
8	(Spain) P Martínez	3	4

=== Bottom half ===
First round
6	(Hungary) A Balázs	2	1
(Czech Republic) L Rosol	6	6
WC	(Czech Republic) J Šátral	1	3
(Portugal) J Domingues	6	6
(Spain) B Zapata Miralles	7^{10}	6^{4}	6
(Slovenia) B Rola	6^{8}	7^{7}	4
(Italy) L Giustino	2	7^{7}	6^{4}
4	(Spain) E López Pérez	6	6^{2}	7^{7}
7	(Germany) O Otte	2	6	6
(Belarus) U Ignatik	6	4	1
Q	(Czech Republic) Pavel Nejedlý	2	2
Q	(Slovakia) F Horanský	6	6
(Czech Republic) V Šafránek	6	6
WC	(Slovakia) Dominik Šproch	3	3
(France) C Lestienne	2	4
2	(Brazil) R Dutra Silva	6	6

Second round
(Czech Republic) L Rosol	7	6
(Portugal) J Domingues	5	4
(Spain) B Zapata Miralles	3	3
4	(Spain) E López Pérez	6	6
7	(Germany) O Otte	4	6^{4}
Q	(Slovakia) F Horanský	6	7^{7}
(Czech Republic) V Šafránek	6	6
2	(Brazil) R Dutra Silva	4	4

Quarterfinals
(Czech Republic) L Rosol	1	6	7^{8}
4	(Spain) E López Pérez	6	2	6^{6}
Q	(Slovakia) F Horanský	0	6	6
(Czech Republic) V Šafránek	6	2	1

Semifinals
(Czech Republic) L Rosol	1	6	7^{7}
Q	(Slovakia) F Horanský	6	3	6^{5}
