= Zheng Qinwen =

Chinese tennis player (born 2002)

Zheng Qinwen 郑钦文
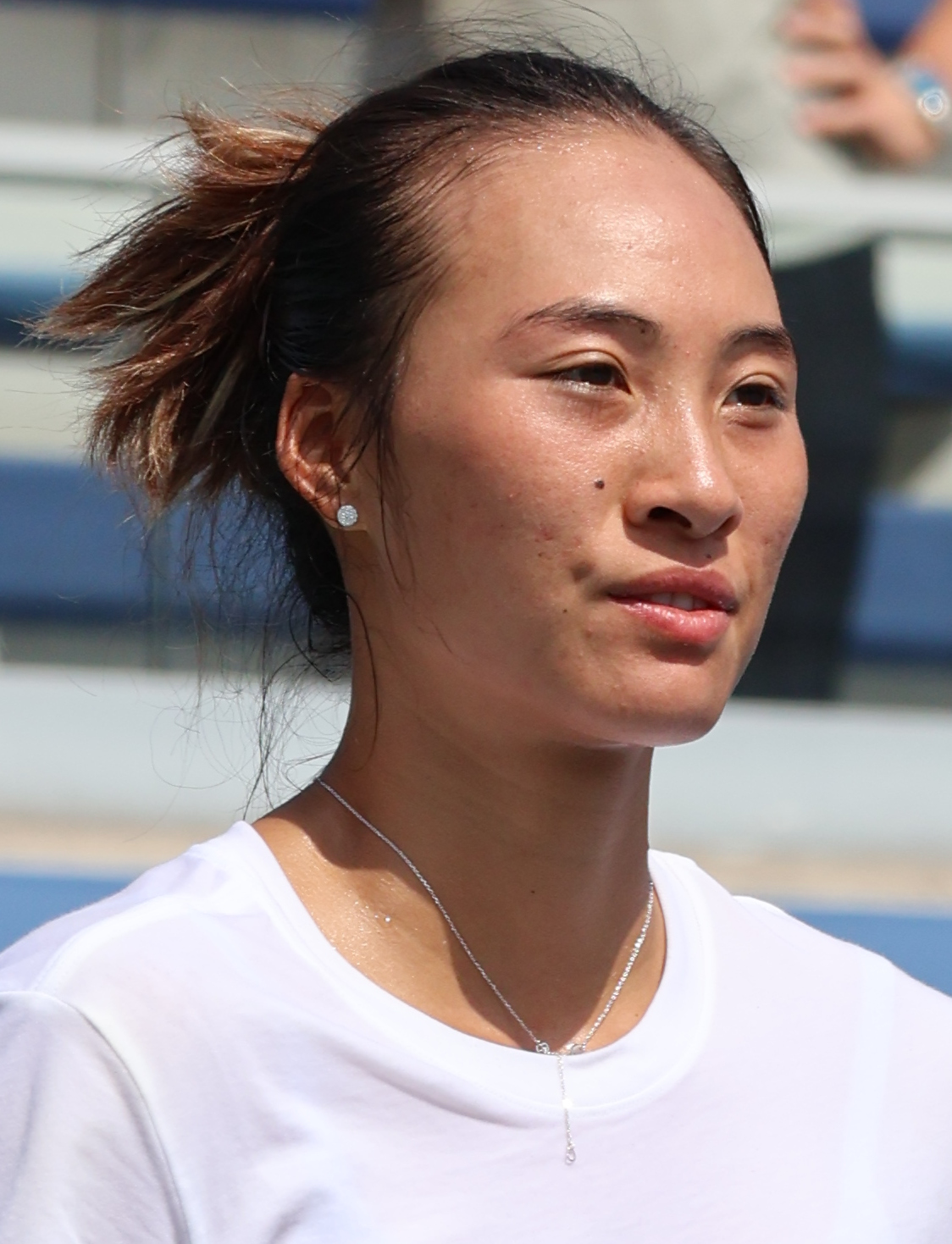
- Zheng at the 2024 US Open
- Country (sports): China
- Residence: Barcelona, Spain
- Born: 8 October 2002 (age 24) Shiyan, Hubei, China
- Height: 1.78 m (5 ft 10 in)
- Turned pro: 2018
- Plays: Right-handed (two-handed backhand)
- College: Huazhong University of Science and Technology
- Coach: Pere Riba (2023–)
- Prize money: US$ 12,415,645

Singles
- Career record: 270–120
- Career titles: 6
- Highest ranking: No. 4 (16 June 2025)
- Current ranking: No. 21 (2 November 2026)

Grand Slam singles results
- Australian Open: F (2024)
- French Open: QF (2025)
- Wimbledon: 3R (2022)
- US Open: QF (2023, 2024, 2026)

Other tournaments
- Tour Finals: F (2024)
- Olympic Games: W (2024)

Doubles
- Career record: 8–13
- Career titles: 0
- Highest ranking: No. 724 (26 October 2020)

Grand Slam doubles results
- Wimbledon: 1R (2022)
Medal record
Women's tennis
Representing China
Olympic Games
Gold medal – first place	2024 Paris	Singles
Asian Games
Gold medal – first place	2022 Hangzhou	Singles
- Last updated on: 19 October 2026.

Zheng Qinwen
- Simplified Chinese: 郑钦文
- Traditional Chinese: 鄭欽文
Transcriptions
Standard Mandarin
- Hanyu Pinyin: Zhèng Qīnwén
- IPA: [ʈʂə̂ŋ tɕʰínwə̌n]

Zheng Qinwen (born 8 October 2002) is a Chinese professional tennis player. She has been ranked world No. 4 by the WTA, achieved in June 2025, and is only the second Chinese player to reach the top 5 in women's singles after Li Na. Zheng has won six career singles titles, including the gold medal at the 2024 Paris Olympics, becoming the first Asian tennis player to win an Olympic gold medal in singles, as well as a WTA 1000 event at the 2026 China Open.

Zheng made her WTA Tour main draw debut in 2021. The following year, she reached the fourth round at the French Open, defeating No. 19 Simona Halep en route. In 2023, Zheng won her first WTA Tour singles title at the Palermo Ladies Open, reached her first career major quarterfinal at the US Open, and reached the final at the WTA Elite Trophy. In 2024, Zheng reached her first major final at the Australian Open, won the gold medal at the Paris Olympics, and finished runner-up at the WTA Finals. The following two years saw injuries weaken her results, but in late 2026 she returned to the US Open quarterfinals and won her first WTA 1000 title on home soil at the China Open.

== Early life and junior years ==
Zheng was born in Shiyan, Hubei, on 8 October 2002. Her parents encouraged her to try several sports during her childhood, including table tennis, before she began playing tennis at the age of seven. At the age of eight, she left her parents and moved to Wuhan to receive more advanced coaching. Her mother initially visited her on weekends and later left her job to support her training full-time. During her formative years, Zheng trained at an academy in Beijing under Carlos Rodríguez, who had previously coached Justine Henin and Li Na. Zheng turned professional in 2018 while continuing to compete on the junior circuit. In December 2018, she reached the girls' singles final of the Orange Bowl, where she lost to Coco Gauff in three sets. In 2019, she reached the girls' singles semifinals at both the French Open and the US Open, and achieved a career-high ITF junior ranking of world No. 6. In late 2019, Zheng moved to Spain to continue her development and established a training base in Barcelona. She began working with Spanish coach Pere Riba in 2021.

== Career ==
=== 2021: WTA Tour debut ===
In January 2021, Zheng won the Tennis Future Hamburg, Germany where she defeated Linda Fruhvirtová in the final of the 25k event, held at the venue of the Hamburger Tennis-Verband. On 20 June 2021, she won the final of the 60k Macha Lake Open in Staré Splavy defeating Aleksandra Krunić in two sets. Zheng made her WTA Tour debut at the Palermo Ladies Open, where she defeated second seed Liudmila Samsonova in the first round, before losing her next match to Jaqueline Cristian.

=== 2022: French 4th round, top 30 ===
Ranked No. 126, Zheng entered the Melbourne Summer Set 1 after qualifying. She beat lucky loser Mai Hontama, Vera Zvonareva, and Ana Konjuh to make her first WTA Tour semifinal, but lost to No. 20 Simona Halep, in straight sets. Zheng debuted at the main draw of a Grand Slam tournament at the Australian Open after qualifying. She defeated Aliaksandra Sasnovich in the first round, but lost in the second round to No. 8 Maria Sakkari. As a result, Zheng broke into the top 100 for the first time.

At the French Open, Zheng defeated Maryna Zanevska in the first round. In the second round, she came back from a set and a break down to upset No. 19 Simona Halep for her first top-20 win. She moved into the fourth round after Alizé Cornet retired while trailing by a set. She lost in the fourth round to world No. 1 and eventual champion Iga Świątek in three sets. She was the only player to win a set against Świątek in the tournament. As a result, Zheng moved to a new career-high of No. 54. She broke into the top 50 a week later after winning her first WTA 125 title at the Open Internacional de Valencia, defeating compatriot Wang Xiyu.

At the Wimbledon Championships, Zheng defeated Sloane Stephens and Greet Minnen to reach the third round, where she fell to No. 23 and eventual champion Elena Rybakina in straight sets.

At the Canadian Open, Zheng came from a set down to defeat wildcard entrant Rebecca Marino in the first round. She advanced to the third round after No. 5 Ons Jabeur retired while trailing by a set. She defeated Bianca Andreescu in three sets to advance to her first WTA 1000 quarterfinal. In the quarterfinals, she lost to No. 14 Karolína Plíšková, in three sets. At the US Open, she defeated No. 16 Jeļena Ostapenko and Anastasia Potapova before losing to Jule Niemeier.

At the Pan Pacific Open, Zheng defeated Misaki Doi, No. 4 Paula Badosa, and Claire Liu, without dropping a set, to reach the semifinals. In the semifinals, she came from a set down to defeat No. 13 Veronika Kudermetova and reach her first WTA Tour final. In the final, she lost to Liudmila Samsonova in straight sets. Despite the loss, Zheng reached a new career-high ranking of No. 28, becoming the first Chinese teenager to break into the top 30. Entering the San Diego Open as a lucky loser, she advanced to the second round as No. 13 Garbiñe Muguruza retired. She lost in the second round to world No. 1 and eventual champion Iga Świątek in three sets. Zheng was named WTA Newcomer of the Year.

=== 2023: First tour titles, top 20 ===
Zheng began the season at the Adelaide International. She defeated No. 17 Anett Kontaveit before losing to Victoria Azarenka. At the Australian Open, she beat Dalma Gálfi before losing to Bernarda Pera.

At the Abu Dhabi Open, Zheng defeated qualifier Rebecca Marino, No. 12 Jeļena Ostapenko, and No. 8 Daria Kasatkina, without dropping a set, to reach the semifinals. She lost in the semifinals to No. 19 Liudmila Samsonova in three sets.

At the Stuttgart Open, Zheng defeated lucky loser Alycia Parks before losing to world No. 1, Iga Świątek, in straight sets. At the Madrid Open, she defeated Caty McNally before losing to No. 17, Ekaterina Alexandrova. At the Italian Open, Zheng defeated Alizé Cornet, qualifier Anna Bondár, and compatriot Wang Xiyu to reach her second WTA 1000 quarterfinal. She then lost to No. 12 Veronika Kudermetova, in three sets. As a result, Zheng reached No. 19 in the WTA rankings, becoming the fifth Chinese player to break into the top 20. At the French Open, she beat qualifier Tamara Zidanšek before losing to Yulia Putintseva.

At Wimbledon, Zheng lost in the first round to Kateřina Siniaková.

Zheng received a wildcard into the Palermo Ladies Open. She double bagelled Sara Errani, then beat Diane Parry, Emma Navarro and Mayar Sherif to reach her second WTA Tour final. She beat Jasmine Paolini in three sets to win her first WTA Tour title.

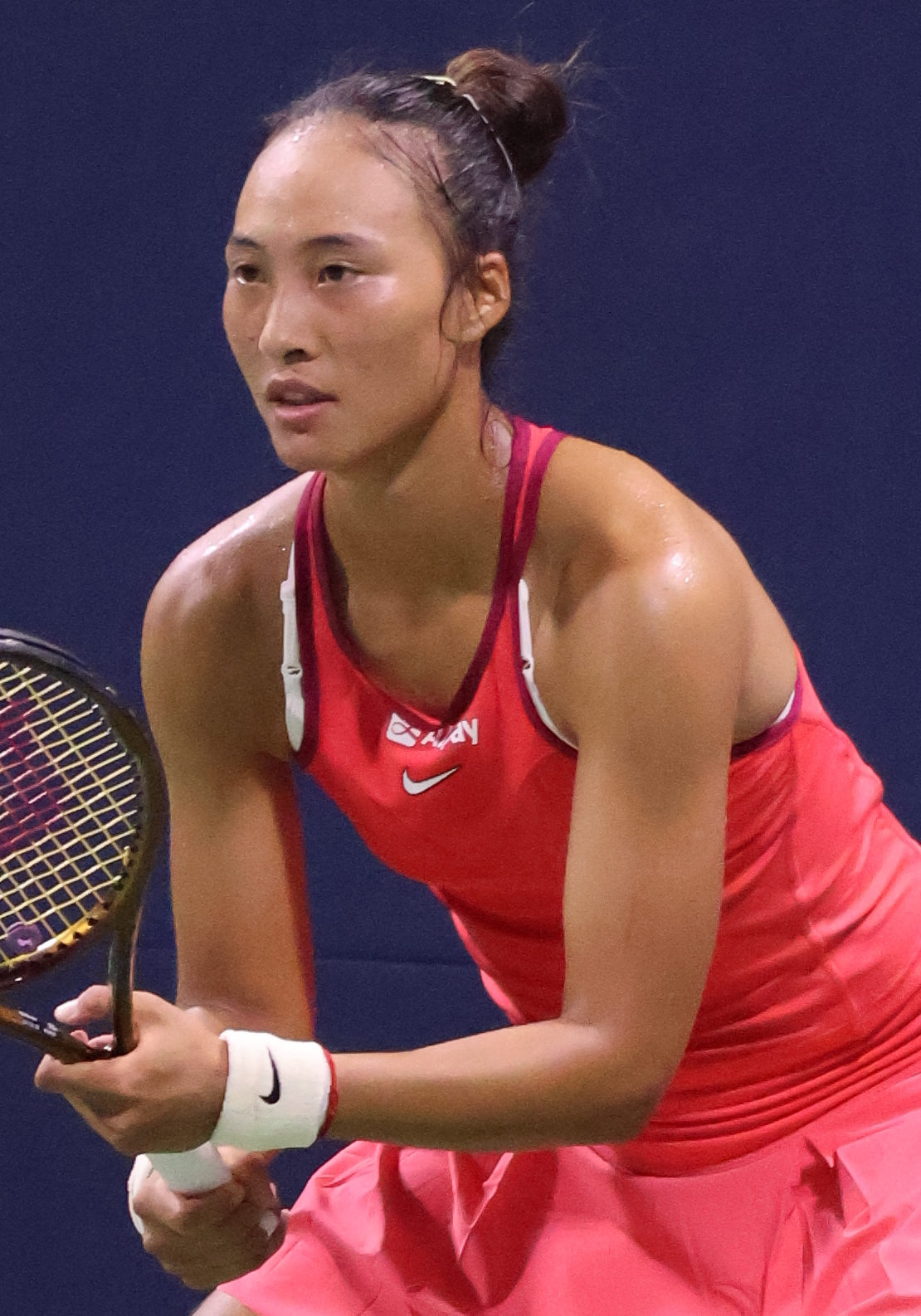
Zheng reached her first Grand Slam quarterfinals at the 2023 US Open.

At the Canadian Open, Zheng defeated Marta Kostyuk before losing to No. 18 Liudmila Samsonova. At the Cincinnati Open, she defeated qualifier Aliaksandra Sasnovich and wildcard entrant Venus Williams before losing to world No. 1, Iga Świątek, in three sets. At the US Open, Zheng defeated Nadia Podoroska, Kaia Kanepi, Lucia Bronzetti, and No. 5 Ons Jabeur to advance to her first major quarterfinal, where she lost to world No. 2, Aryna Sabalenka, in straight sets.

Zheng won gold in singles at the Asian Games. At the China Open, she lost in the first round to world No. 5, Elena Rybakina. At the Zhengzhou Open, Zheng defeated qualifier Kateryna Volodko, No. 6 Maria Sakkari, Anhelina Kalinina, and Jasmine Paolini, without dropping a set, to reach the final. She defeated world No. 18, Barbora Krejčíková, in the final in three sets to win her second career title. Zheng made her debut at the WTA Elite Trophy. She defeated Donna Vekić and Jeļena Ostapenko in the round-robin stage. She beat compatriot Zhu Lin in the semifinals but lost in the final to Beatriz Haddad Maia, in straight sets. Zheng was named WTA Most Improved Player.

=== 2024: Olympic champion, Australia final ===
Zheng made her debut at the United Cup as China's No. 1 player. She defeated Markéta Vondroušová and Olga Danilović before losing to Iga Świątek in straight sets. At the Australian Open, Zheng came from a set down to defeat Ashlyn Krueger in the first round. She defeated Katie Boulter, compatriot Wang Yafan, and Océane Dodin to reach her second consecutive major quarterfinal. She came from a set down to defeat Anna Kalinskaya and reach her first major semifinal. She beat qualifier Dayana Yastremska in straight sets to reach her first major final. In the final, she lost to world No. 2 and defending champion, Aryna Sabalenka, in straight sets. As a result, Zheng made her top 10 debut following the tournament, at No. 7. She became the second Chinese player to be ranked inside the top 10 following Li Na.

At the Qatar Ladies Open, Zheng defeated Magda Linette before losing to Leylah Fernandez. At the Dubai Championships, Zheng defeated qualifier Nao Hibino and Anastasia Potapova to reach her third WTA 1000 quarterfinal, where she lost to world No. 1, Iga Świątek, in straight sets.

At the Italian Open, Zheng defeated Shelby Rogers, No. 29 Linda Nosková, and Naomi Osaka to reach her fourth WTA 1000 quarterfinal, where she lost to No. 3 Coco Gauff in straight sets. At the French Open, she defeated wildcard entrant Alizé Cornet and Tamara Korpatsch before losing to Elina Avanesyan.

At Wimbledon, Zheng lost in the first round to qualifier Lulu Sun.

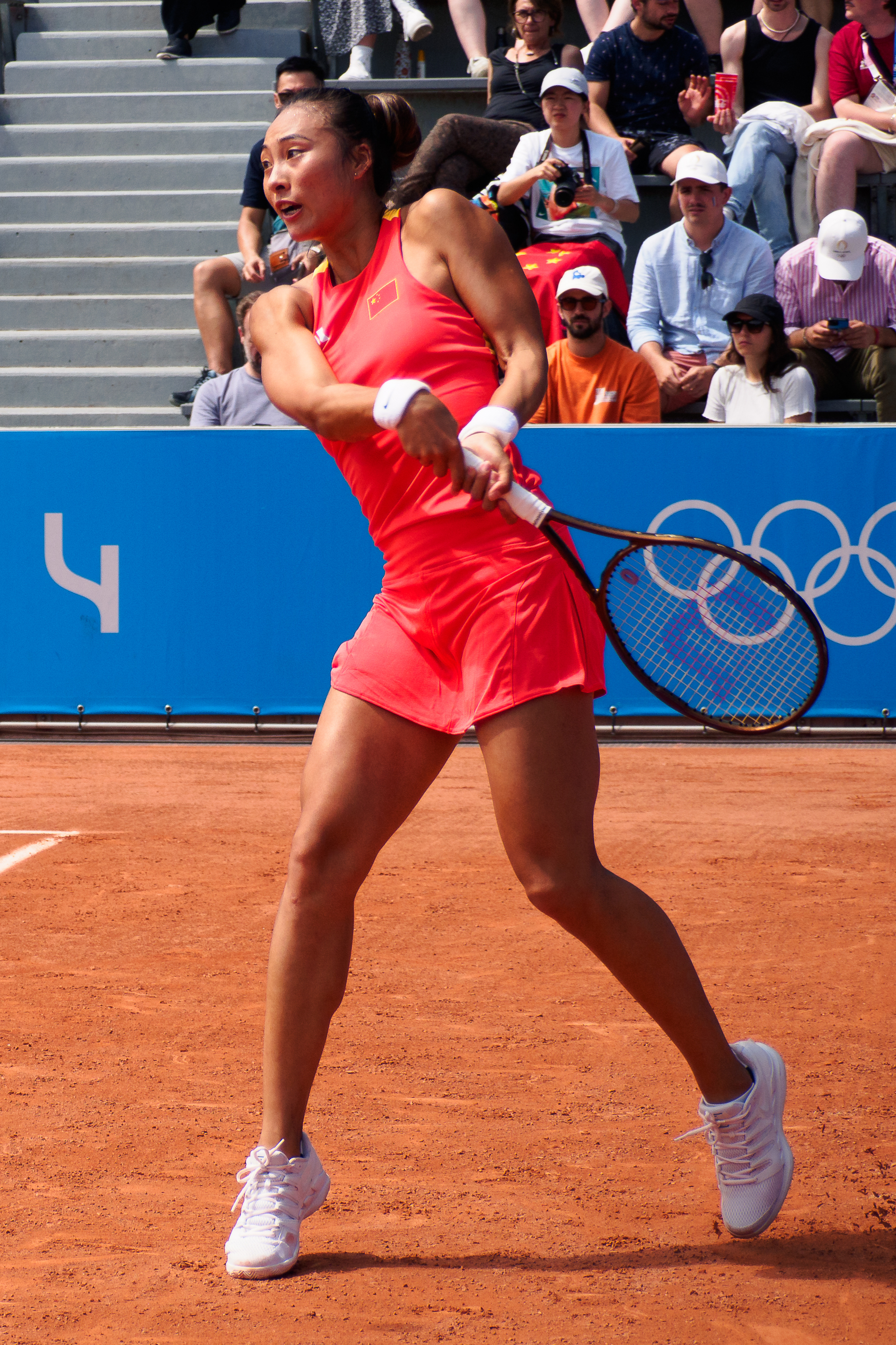
At the 2024 Summer Olympics, Zheng won the gold medal in women's singles.

Zheng defended her title at Palermo in July. She defeated Sara Errani, Petra Martić, Jaqueline Cristian, and Diane Parry without dropping a set, to reach the final. In the final, she defeated Karolína Muchová in three sets. Seeded sixth at the Paris Olympics, Zheng defeated Sara Errani and Arantxa Rus to reach the third round. She came from a set down to defeat 11th seed Emma Navarro and Angelique Kerber to reach the semifinals. In the semifinals, she upset top seed and four-time French Open winner Iga Świątek in straight sets, ending her 25-match winning streak at Roland Garros. She defeated 13th seed, Donna Vekić, in the final in straight sets to win the gold medal in women's singles, becoming the first Asian player to win Olympic gold in a singles event. This was also China's second-ever Olympic gold in tennis, and the first since the women's doubles in 2004.

At the US Open, Zheng came from a set down to defeat wildcard entrant Amanda Anisimova and Erika Andreeva. She defeated Jule Niemeier and No. 24 Donna Vekić to make her second consecutive US Open quarterfinal. In the quarterfinals, she lost again to world No. 2 and eventual champion Aryna Sabalenka in straight sets.

At the China Open, Zheng defeated lucky loser Kamilla Rakhimova and Nadia Podoroska to reach the fourth round. She came from a set down to defeat Amanda Anisimova and No. 22 Mirra Andreeva to advance to her first WTA 1000 semifinal. In the semifinals, she lost to Karolína Muchová in straight sets. At the Wuhan Open, Zheng defeated wildcard entrant Jaqueline Cristian in her opening match. She defeated Leylah Fernandez and No. 6 Jasmine Paolini in three sets to reach the semifinals. She defeated compatriot Wang Xinyu to advance to her first WTA 1000 final. In the final, she lost again to world No. 2 Aryna Sabalenka in three sets. At the Pan Pacific Open, Zheng defeated Moyuka Uchijima, Leylah Fernandez, and No. 16 Diana Shnaider to reach the final. She overcame wildcard entrant Sofia Kenin in straight sets to claim her third title of the year and clinch a place at the WTA Finals for the first time in her career.

At the WTA Finals, Zheng lost her opening group match against Aryna Sabalenka but then defeated Elena Rybakina and Jasmine Paolini to reach the semifinals. In the semifinals, she overcame Barbora Krejčíková. In the final, she lost to Coco Gauff in a match which went to a third-set tiebreak. Despite the defeat, Zheng reached a career-high ranking of world No. 5.

=== 2025: French quarterfinal, surgery ===
At the Australian Open, Zheng defeated qualifier Anca Todoni before losing in the second round to Laura Siegemund. She then lost her opening matches at the Qatar Ladies Open to Ons Jabeur and at the Dubai Championships against Peyton Stearns.

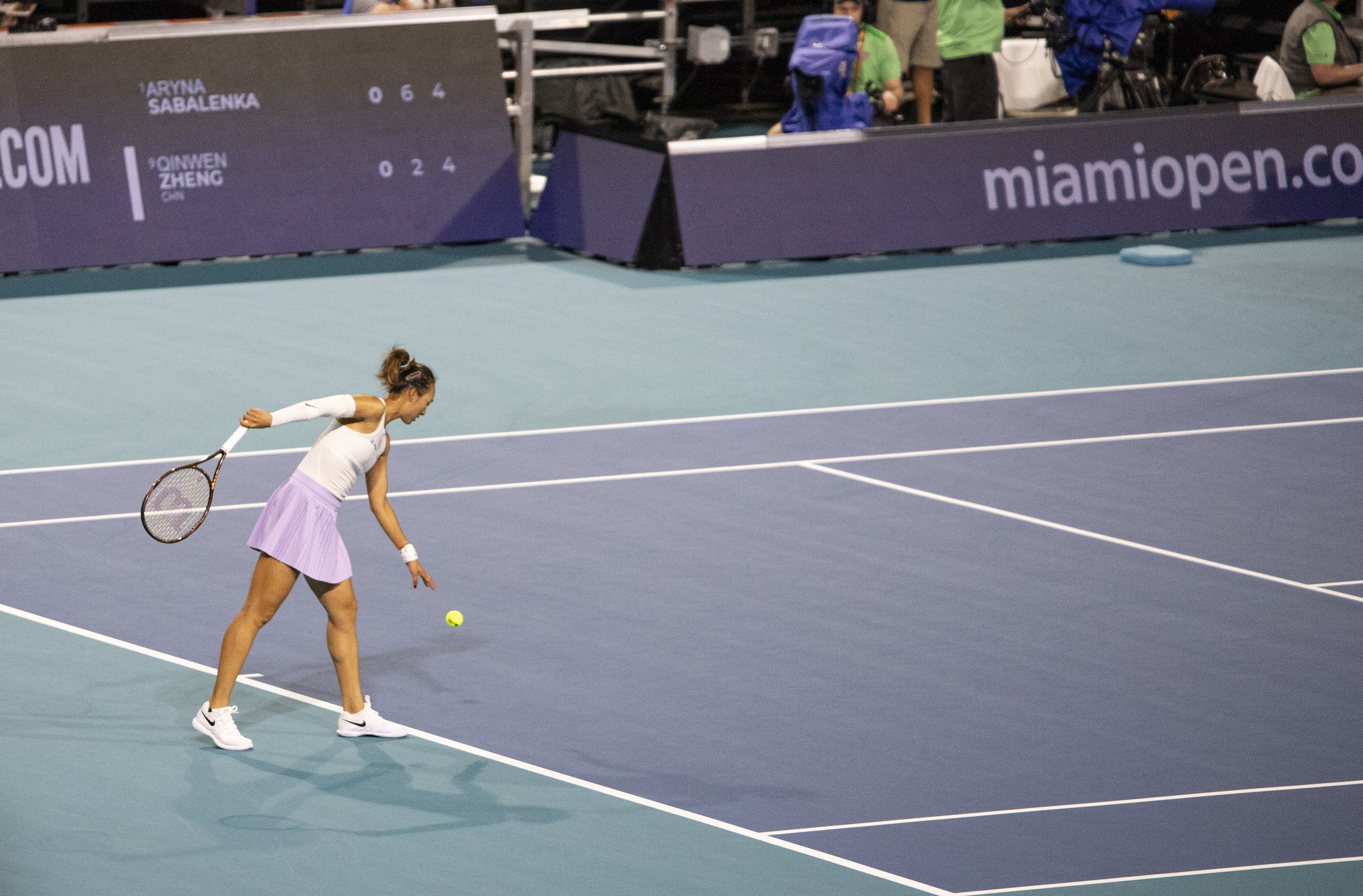
Zheng at the 2025 Miami Open

At the Indian Wells, Zheng defeated Victoria Azarenka, Lulu Sun and No. 24 Marta Kostyuk, without dropping a set, to reach the quarterfinals. She lost in the quarterfinals to world No. 2 Iga Świątek in straight sets. At the Miami Open, Zheng overcame Lauren Davis, qualifier Taylor Townsend, and Ashlyn Krueger, without dropping a set, to reach the quarterfinals. She lost in the quarterfinals to world No. 1 and eventual champion Aryna Sabalenka in straight sets.

At the Charleston Open, Zheng made it three quarterfinals in as many tournaments with wins over Maria Sakkari and No. 28 Elise Mertens, before losing in the last eight to No. 26 Ekaterina Alexandrova. At the Italian Open, Zheng overcame Olga Danilović, No. 25 Magdalena Fręch, and Bianca Andreescu, without dropping a set, to reach the quarterfinals. In the quarterfinals, she upset world No. 1 Aryna Sabalenka for the first time after losing their previous six meetings. She lost in the semifinals to No. 3 Coco Gauff in a three-hour match that went to a third-set tiebreak.

At the French Open, Zheng defeated Anastasia Pavlyuchenkova, Emiliana Arango, qualifier Victoria Mboko, and No. 18 Liudmila Samsonova to reach her first French Open quarterfinal. She lost in the quarterfinals to world No. 1 Aryna Sabalenka in straight sets.

At the Queen's Club Championships in London, Zheng defeated McCartney Kessler and wildcard entrant Emma Raducanu to advance to her first grass-court semifinal. She lost in the semifinals to No. 15 Amanda Anisimova, in three sets. Nevertheless, her ranking rose to a new career-high of No. 4. She went out in the first round of Wimbledon at the hands of Kateřina Siniaková.

On 19 July, Zheng announced she had undergone surgery on her right elbow the previous day and would be out of action for an unspecified amount of time, saying on social media that she had been dealing with "persistent pain" in the joint "over the past months" and the procedure was a "necessary step toward a better version of myself on court."

Zheng made her return to WTA Tour in the last week of September at the China Open where, as seventh seed, she received a bye and then defeated qualifier Emiliana Arango to reach the third round. There, she retired while trailing in the third set against No. 27 Linda Nosková due to an issue with her recently operated upon elbow. Zheng subsequently withdrew from the Wuhan Open.

=== 2026: First WTA 1000 title ===
Zheng missed the first month of the 2026 season including the Australian Open while she continued to recover from her elbow surgery. In February, she made her return to the WTA Tour at the Qatar Open where she defeated Sofia Kenin and qualifier Alycia Parks, before losing in the third round to second seed Elena Rybakina. The following week, Zheng withdrew from the Dubai Tennis Championships due to illness.

Her next appearance was at the WTA 1000 tournament in Indian Wells, where, as 24th seed, she received a bye into the second round but lost to Antonia Ružić in straight sets. At the Miami Open, as 23rd seed, Zheng received a first-round bye and then defeated wildcard entrant Sloane Stephens and 15th seed Madison Keys to reach the fourth round, at which point her run was ended by world No.1 Aryna Sabalenka.

She made it through to the third round at her next two tournaments, the Madrid Open, where she lost to second seed Elena Rybakina, and the Italian Open, where she was eliminated by Jeļena Ostapenko. As a result of these early exits, Zheng dropped out of the world's top 50 for the first time since August 2022. At the French Open, she went out in the opening round of this major for the first time in her career, losing to qualifier and eventual finalist Maja Chwalińska and winning just four games throughout the entire match. Due to her defeat and subsequent loss of the ranking points she was defending from reaching the quarterfinals the previous year, Zheng fell out of the world's top 100.

Zheng began her grass-court season at the Queen's Club Championships in London, but lost to Jaqueline Cristian in the first round. The following week, having dropped further down the rankings to world No. 160, she defeated Maria Sakkari at the Nottingham Open, before losing in the second round to Talia Gibson. Zheng was given a wildcard entry into the main-draw at the Bad Homburg Open and overcame qualifier Solana Sierra to reach the second round, where she lost to Clara Tauson. At Wimbledon, she lost to 32nd seed Kateřina Siniaková in the first round for the second year in succession.

In July at the Athens Open, Zheng won back-to-back WTA Tour matches for the first time in two months with defeats of sixth seed Jéssica Bouzas Maneiro and qualifier Elena Micic, before losing to third seed Barbora Krejčíková in the quarterfinals, a loss which confirmed she would miss out on direct qualification for that year's US Open.

Zheng Qinwen at the 2026 US Open

Having successfully navigated the three qualifying rounds at the US Open, Zheng progressed through the draw and defeated No. 24 Madison Keys in the third round despite a 5–0 deficit in the final set. In the fourth round she won in straight sets against No. 8 Iga Swiatek, but again overcame a 5–0 deficit in the first set to reach her third US Open quarterfinal (and fifth major quarterfinal overall), becoming the first qualifier to reach the quarterfinals at the US Open since Emma Raducanu in 2021. Despite losing in the quarterfinals to world No. 2 and eventual champion Elena Rybakina in three sets (after winning the first set), Zheng returned to the top 100 following the tournament, climbing nearly 70 spots from No. 121 to No. 52.

Entering as a wildcard, Zheng reached her first WTA 1000 semifinal in over a year in Beijing, upsetting seeds Anna Kalinskaya and Marie Bouzková, then defeating Alina Charaeva, and finally upsetting 6th seed and world no. 7 Elina Svitolina. She then defeated Elise Mertens to reach the final, becoming the first wildcard to do so, and the first Chinese player to do so since Chen Li in 1996. Zheng then won her first WTA 1000 title and first title in 2 years by defeating Mirra Andreeva in the final, in the process becoming the first Chinese player and first wildcard to win the title. As a result, she returned to the world's top 30.

== Playing style ==
Zheng's game is centred on baseline aggression and is built around her powerful serve and heavy-topspin forehand. Her forehand has been described as a signature weapon, capable of pushing opponents behind the baseline and creating opportunities for her to dictate rallies. At the 2024 Australian Open, her forehands averaged 2,800 revolutions per minute, the highest spin rate among the women competing at the tournament and close to the men's tournament average. Zheng is also an athletic mover whose first serve can be highly effective when it lands in, complementing her forehand and allowing her to control points from the opening shot. However, her serve has at times been affected by technical issues and a low first-serve percentage. Her heavy topspin and comparatively long swings initially made her particularly effective on clay courts, although she has become increasingly capable on faster surfaces. Although she primarily seeks to dictate play from the baseline, she can vary the pace of rallies with high, looping balls and drop shots, a tactic she used effectively during her victory over Iga Świątek in the semifinals of the 2024 Paris Olympics.

== Coaches ==
In 2021, Zheng began working with coach Pere Riba. In June 2023, Zheng split with Riba and hired Wim Fissette. Previously, Fissette had coached Naomi Osaka, until they split in July 2022. However, in September 2023, Fissette abruptly ended his collaboration with Zheng, a decision which Zheng called "immoral". Fissette later reunited with Osaka following the birth of her daughter in July 2023. In December 2023, Zheng reunited with Riba.

== Endorsements ==
In 2015, Zheng signed a sponsorship deal with Nike. Her racquets have been provided by Wilson. After her run at the 2026 US Open, Nike produced a Zoom Vapor 12 player exclusive for her. In 2022, Zheng became a Rolex Testimonee and signed endorsement deals with the financial services company Ant Group and the dairy company Yili Group. In 2023, she signed sponsorship deals with Gatorade and Swisse. In 2024, Zheng joined Lancôme as a brand ambassador, signed sponsorship deals with the milk tea brand Chagee and the consumer electronics brand vivo, and became a brand ambassador for Audi. In 2025, she became a global brand ambassador for Dior and Beats.

== Personal life ==
Zheng has cited Li Na—the only Chinese player to win a singles major title—as a source of inspiration. In 2024, Zheng said: "I watched her since I was a little kid so I'm trying to follow in her steps. She inspired me a lot when I was a child." Zheng has also credited her parents' support and guidance as a reason for her success.

Following her gold medal win at the 2024 Summer Olympics, Zheng said that she had always wanted "to become one of the Asians that can inspire young kids and make them love tennis more". She also said she looked up to Liu Xiang, a Chinese hurdler whose win in the 110-meter hurdles at the 2004 Summer Olympics was China's first gold in any men's track and field event. In a 2024 interview with Sky Sports, Zheng said her hobbies include walking with her family, reading, and singing. She also enjoys roller coaster rides and is a fan of the K-pop group Blackpink.

According to the China Charity Federation, Zheng donated 1 million yuan in August 2026 for disaster relief in Gyirong County during the 2026 Nepal–Tibet floods.

== Career statistics ==
=== Grand Slam singles performance timeline ===
Key
W	F	SF	QF	#R	RR	Q#	DNQ	A	NH

(W) winner; (F) finalist; (SF) semifinalist; (QF) quarterfinalist; (#R) rounds 4, 3, 2, 1; (RR) round-robin stage; (Q#) qualification round; (DNQ) did not qualify; (A) absent; (NH) not held; (SR) strike rate (events won / competed); (W–L) win–loss record.
To avoid confusion and double counting, these charts are updated at the conclusion of a tournament or when the player's participation has ended.

Current through the 2026 US Open.

Tournament	2022	2023	2024	2025	2026	SR	W–L	Win %
Australian Open	2R	2R	F	2R	A	0 / 4	9–4	69%
French Open	4R	2R	3R	QF	1R	0 / 5	10–5	67%
Wimbledon	3R	1R	1R	1R	1R	0 / 5	2–5	29%
US Open	3R	QF	QF	A	QF	0 / 4	14–4	78%
Win–Loss	8–4	6–4	12–4	5–3	4–3	0 / 18	35–18	66%

=== Grand Slam tournament finals ===
==== Singles: 1 (runner-up) ====
Result	Year	Tournament	Surface	Opponent	Score
Loss	2024	Australian Open	Hard	Aryna Sabalenka	3–6, 2–6

=== Year-end championships finals ===
==== Singles: 1 (runner-up) ====
Result	Year	Tournament	Surface	Opponent	Score
Loss	2024	WTA Finals	Hard (i)	(United States) Coco Gauff	6–3, 4–6, 6–7^{(2–7)}

=== Olympic medal matches ===
==== Singles: 1 (gold medal) ====
Result	Year	Tournament	Surface	Opponent	Score
Gold	2024	Paris Olympics	Clay	(Croatia) Donna Vekić	6–2, 6–3

=== WTA 1000 tournaments ===
==== Singles: 2 (1 title, 1 runner-up) ====
Result	Year	Tournament	Surface	Opponent	Score
Loss	2024	Wuhan Open	Hard	Aryna Sabalenka	3–6, 7–5, 3–6
Win	2026	China Open	Hard	Mirra Andreeva	7–5, 6–4
