= Kimberley Zimmermann =

Belgian tennis player

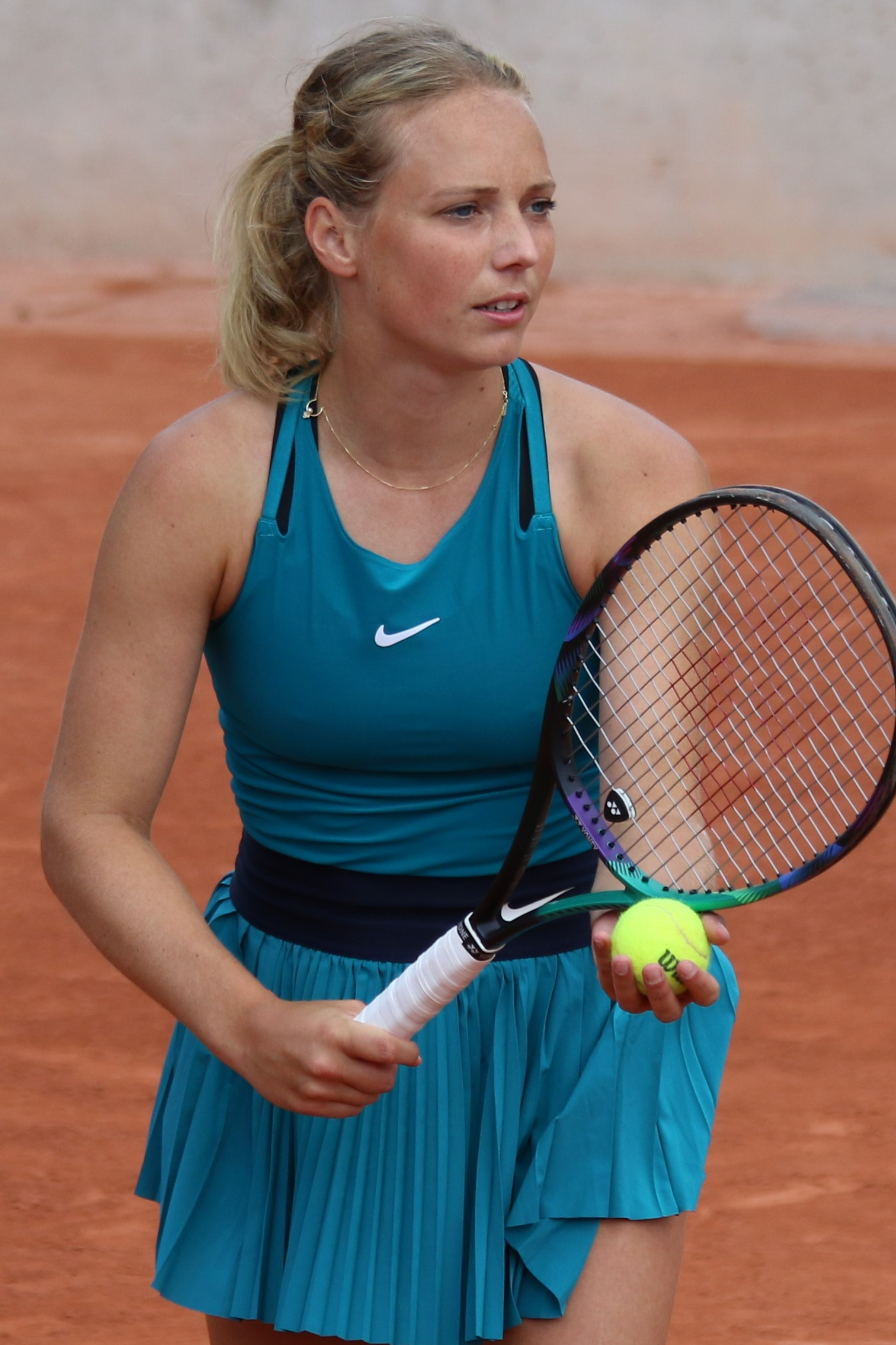
- Zimmermann at the 2022 French Open
- Country (sports): Belgium
- Born: 9 November 1995 (age 30) Wemmel, Belgium
- Height: 1.72 m (5 ft 8 in)
- Plays: Right (two-handed backhand)
- Prize money: $538,977

Singles
- Career record: 245–236
- Career titles: 0 WTA, 2 ITF
- Highest ranking: No. 215 (13 May 2019)

Grand Slam singles results
- Australian Open: Q1 (2019)
- Wimbledon: Q1 (2019)

Doubles
- Career record: 296–254
- Career titles: 3 WTA, 2 WTA 125
- Highest ranking: No. 37 (6 March 2023)
- Current ranking: No. 860 (3 August 2026)

Grand Slam doubles results
- Australian Open: 2R (2023)
- French Open: QF (2022)
- Wimbledon: 2R (2023)
- US Open: 1R (2022, 2023)

Grand Slam mixed doubles results
- Australian Open: 1R (2023)
- US Open: 1R (2022)
- Last updated on: 10 August 2026.

Kimberley Zimmermann (born 9 November 1995) is a Belgian tennis player. Zimmermann has a career-high singles ranking of world No. 215, achieved on 13 May 2019. On 6 March 2023, she peaked at No. 37 in the WTA doubles rankings. Zimmermann has specialized in doubles since 2021, and she has won three doubles titles on the WTA Tour and two on WTA 125 tournaments, along with two singles and 18 doubles titles on the ITF Circuit.

== Career overview ==
Zimmermann won her first tour title in July 2021 at the Palermo Ladies Open, in the doubles event, partnering Erin Routliffe and defended her title the following year partnering with Anna Bondár.

She defended the doubles title for a third consecutive year in 2023, this time partnering Yana Sizikova.

== Family ==
Kimberley Zimmermann is the daughter of Michel Zimmermann, men's 400 metres hurdles' finalist at the 1984 Summer Olympics.

== Performance timelines ==
Key
W	F	SF	QF	#R	RR	Q#	DNQ	A	NH

(W) winner; (F) finalist; (SF) semifinalist; (QF) quarterfinalist; (#R) rounds 4, 3, 2, 1; (RR) round-robin stage; (Q#) qualification round; (DNQ) did not qualify; (A) absent; (NH) not held; (SR) strike rate (events won / competed); (W–L) win–loss record.
To avoid confusion and double counting, these charts are updated at the conclusion of a tournament or when the player's participation has ended.

=== Doubles ===
Tournament	2022	2023	2024	2025	W–L
Grand Slam tournaments
Australian Open	1R	2R	1R	1R	1–4
French Open	QF	2R	1R	A	4–3
Wimbledon	1R	A	1R	A	0–2
US Open	1R	1R	A	A	0–2
Win–loss	3–4	2–3	0–3	0–1	5–11
WTA 1000
Dubai / Qatar Open (Note: The first Premier 5 event of the year has switched back and forth between the Dubai Tennis Championships and the Qatar Ladies Open since 2009. Dubai was classified as a Premier 5 event from 2009 to 2011 before being succeeded by Doha for the 2012–2014 period. In 2015, Dubai regained its Premier 5 status while Doha was demoted to Premier status. The Premier 5 tournaments were reclassified as WTA 1000 tournaments in 2021.)	A	QF	A	A	1–1
Indian Wells Open	A	1R	A	A	0–1
Miami Open	A	1R	A	A	0–1
Madrid Open	1R	1R	A	A	0–2
Canadian Open	1R	A	A	A	0–1
Guadalajara Open	2R	A	A	A	1–1

== WTA Tour finals ==
=== Doubles: 5 (3 titles, 2 runner-ups) ===
Legend WTA 500 WTA 250 (3–2)	Finals by surface Clay (3–1) Hard (0–1)

Result	W–L	Date	Tournament	Tier	Surface	Partner	Opponents	Score
Win	1–0	Jul 2021	Palermo Ladies Open, Italy	WTA 250	Clay	(New Zealand) Erin Routliffe	(Georgia (country)) Natela Dzalamidze (Russia) Kamilla Rakhimova	7–6^{(5)}, 4–6, [10–4]
Loss	1–1	Sep 2021	Luxembourg Open, Luxembourg	WTA 250	Hard (i)	(New Zealand) Erin Routliffe	(Belgium) Greet Minnen (Belgium) Alison Van Uytvanck	3–6, 3–6
Loss	1–2	Jul 2022	Budapest Grand Prix, Hungary	WTA 250	Clay	(Poland) Katarzyna Piter	(Georgia (country)) Ekaterine Gorgodze (Georgia (country)) Oksana Kalashnikova	6–1, 4–6, [6–10]
Win	2–2	Jul 2022	Palermo Ladies Open, Italy (2)	WTA 250	Clay	(Hungary) Anna Bondár	(Russia) Amina Anshba (Hungary) Panna Udvardy	6–3, 6–2
Win	3–2	Jul 2023	Palermo Ladies Open, Italy (3)	WTA 250	Clay	(Russia) Yana Sizikova	(Italy) Angelica Moratelli (Italy) Camilla Rosatello	6–2, 6–4

== WTA 125 finals ==
=== Doubles: 4 (2 titles, 2 runner-ups) ===
Result	W–L	Date	Tournament	Surface	Partner	Opponents	Score
Win	1–0	Sep 2022	Hungarian Pro Open, Hungary	Clay	(Hungary) Anna Bondár	(Czech Republic) Jesika Malečková (Czech Republic) Renata Voráčová	6–3, 2–6, [10–5]
Loss	1–1	Sep 2023	Emilia-Romagna Open, Italy	Clay	(Hungary) Anna Bondár	(Slovenia) Dalila Jakupović (Russia) Irina Khromacheva	2–6, 3–6
Loss	1–2	Oct 2023	Open de Rouen, France	Hard (i)	(Hungary) Anna Bondár	(United Kingdom) Maia Lumsden (France) Jessika Ponchet	3–6, 6–7^{(4–7)}
Win	2–2	Aug 2024	Hamburg European Open, Germany	Clay	(Hungary) Anna Bondár	(Netherlands) Arantxa Rus (Serbia) Nina Stojanović	5–7, 6–3, [11–9]

== ITF Circuit finals ==
Legend
$100,000 tournaments
$80,000 tournaments
$60,000 tournaments
$25,000 tournaments
$10/15,000 tournaments

=== Singles: 4 (2 titles, 2 runner-ups) ===
Result	W–L	Date	Tournament	Tier	Surface	Opponent	Score
Loss	0–1	Jul 2016	ITF Brussels, Belgium	10,000	Clay	(Australia) Ellen Perez	2–6, 3–6
Win	1–1	Aug 2016	ITF Wanfercée-Baulet, Belgium	10,000	Clay	(Belgium) Hélène Scholsen	6–2, 6–2
Win	2–1	May 2018	ITF Caserta, Italy	25,000	Clay	(Italy) Stefania Rubini	1–6, 7–5, 6–1
Loss	2–2	Sep 2018	Montreux Ladies Open, Switzerland	60,000	Clay	(Poland) Iga Świątek	2–6, 2–6

=== Doubles: 40 (18 titles, 22 runner-ups) ===
Result	W–L	Date	Tournament	Tier	Surface	Partner	Opponents	Score
Loss	0–1	Aug 2011	ITF Rebecq, Belgium	10,000	Hard	(Belgium) Marie Benoît	(Netherlands) Kim Kilsdonk (Netherlands) Nicolette van Uitert	2–6, 2–6
Loss	0–2	Aug 2013	ITF Koksijde, Belgium	25,000	Clay	(Belgium) Marie Benoît	(Belgium) Magali Kempen (Belgium) Nicky van Dyck	3–6, 6–7^{(3)}
Loss	0–3	Oct 2013	ITF Antalya, Turkey	10,000	Clay	(Belgium) Marie Benoît	(Netherlands) Quirine Lemoine (Netherlands) Gabriela van de Graaf	3–6, 6–0, [7–10]
Loss	0–4	Nov 2013	ITF Antalya, Turkey	10,000	Clay	(Bosnia and Herzegovina) Anita Husarić	(Serbia) Natalija Kostić (Slovakia) Karin Morgošová	6–7^{(2)}, 4–6
Loss	0–5	Apr 2014	ITF Heraklion, Greece	10,000	Hard	(Belgium) Marie Benoît	(Russia) Polina Leykina (Greece) Despina Papamichail	2–6, 2–6
Win	1–5	May 2014	ITF Tarsus, Turkey	10,000	Clay	(Bosnia and Herzegovina) Anita Husarić	(Russia) Anastasia Pivovarova (Turkey) Melis Sezer	6–4, 6–2
Loss	1–6	Sep 2014	ITF Pula, Italy	10,000	Clay	(Belgium) Marie Benoît	(Italy) Alice Balducci (Italy) Georgia Brescia	6–3, 0–6, [5–10]
Loss	1–7	Sep 2014	ITF Pula, Italy	10,000	Clay	(Belgium) Marie Benoît	(Italy) Verena Hofer (Italy) Martina Pratesi	4–6, 5–7
Loss	1–8	Oct 2014	ITF Pula, Italy	10,000	Clay	(Belgium) Marie Benoît	(Germany) Anna Klasen (Germany) Charlotte Klasen	3–6, 6–4, [8–10]
Win	2–8	Feb 2015	ITF Antalya, Turkey	10,000	Clay	(Bosnia and Herzegovina) Anita Husarić	(Turkey) Başak Eraydın (Italy) Verena Meliss	6–0, 6–3
Win	3–8	Mar 2015	ITF Pula, Italy	10,000	Clay	(Italy) Claudia Giovine	(Romania) Irina Bara (Hungary) Lilla Barzó	7–6^{(4)}, 6–3
Loss	3–9	Apr 2015	ITF Pula, Italy	10,000	Clay	(France) Margot Yerolymos	(Romania) Irina Bara (Romania) Oana Georgeta Simion	5–7, 4–6
Loss	3–10	Jul 2015	ITF Knokke, Belgium	10,000	Clay	(Australia) Sally Peers	(Belgium) Elyne Boeykens (Netherlands) Kelly Versteeg	2–6, 4–6
Loss	3–11	Sep 2015	ITF Pula, Italy	10,000	Clay	(Switzerland) Nina Stadler	(Greece) Despina Papamichail (France) Carla Touly	3–6, 4–6
Win	4–11	Sep 2015	ITF Pula, Italy	10,000	Clay	(Switzerland) Nina Stadler	(Italy) Alice Balducci (Italy) Camilla Scala	6–0, 6–1
Win	5–11	Feb 2016	GB Pro-Series Glasgow, UK	10,000	Hard (i)	(Switzerland) Nina Stadler	(Oman) Fatma Al-Nabhani (Germany) Anna Zaja	6–2, 7–6^{(7)}
Loss	5–12	Mar 2016	ITF Amiens, France	10,000	Clay (i)	(France) Alice Bacquié	(Italy) Gioia Barbieri (Italy) Giorgia Marchetti	3–6, 4–6
Loss	5–13	Apr 2016	ITF Manama, Bahrain	10,000	Hard	(Germany) Katharina Hering	(Russia) Anna Kalinskaya (Slovakia) Tereza Mihalíková	5–7, 3–6
Loss	5–14	Jan 2017	ITF Stuttgart, Germany	15,000	Hard (i)	(Bosnia and Herzegovina) Anita Husarić	(Czech Republic) Miriam Kolodziejová (Czech Republic) Markéta Vondroušová	6–7^{(3)}, 5–7
Win	6–14	Mar 2017	ITF Le Havre, France	15,000	Clay (i)	(Belgium) Elyne Boeykens	(Oman) Fatma Al-Nabhani (Romania) Diana Negreanu	7–6^{(5)}, 6–3
Win	7–14	May 2017	ITF Båstad, Sweden	25,000	Clay	(Belgium) An-Sophie Mestach	(Belarus) Ilona Kremen (Sweden) Cornelia Lister	4–6, 6–2, [10–5]
Loss	7–15	Jun 2017	Bredeney Ladies Open, Germany	25,000	Clay	(Bosnia and Herzegovina) Anita Husarić	(Germany) Carolin Daniels (Belarus) Lidziya Marozava	1–6, 4–6
Win	8–15	Jun 2017	ITF Périgueux, France	25,000	Clay	(Italy) Camilla Rosatello	(France) Manon Arcangioli (France) Shérazad Reix	6–4, 6–3
Loss	8–16	Jan 2018	Open Andrézieux-Bouthéon, France	60,000	Hard (i)	(Italy) Camilla Rosatello	(Belgium) Ysaline Bonaventure (Netherlands) Bibiane Schoofs	6–4, 5–7, [7–10]
Loss	8–17	Jul 2018	ITF Prague Open, Czech Republic	80,000	Clay	(Netherlands) Bibiane Schoofs	(Sweden) Cornelia Lister (Serbia) Nina Stojanović	2–6, 6–2, [8–10]
Win	9–17	Jul 2019	Open de Biarritz, France	W80	Clay	(France) Manon Arcangioli	(Mexico) Victoria Rodríguez (Romania) Ioana Loredana Roșca	2–6, 6–3, [10–6]
Win	10–17	Aug 2019	ITF Koksijde, Belgium	W25	Clay	(Belgium) Lara Salden	(Netherlands) Suzan Lamens (Russia) Anna Pribylova	6–1, 6–7^{(3)}, [11–9]
Loss	10–18	Aug 2019	ITF Las Palmas, Spain	W25	Clay	(France) Manon Arcangioli	(Spain) Marina Bassols Ribera (China) Feng Shuo	3–6, 1–6
Loss	10–19	Oct 2019	ITF Cherbourg, France	W25	Hard (i)	(France) Myrtille Georges	(United Kingdom) Naomi Broady (United Kingdom) Samantha Murray	3–6, 2–6
Win	11–19	Nov 2019	ITF Malibu, US	W25	Hard	(Hungary) Dalma Gálfi	(United States) Lorraine Guillermo (Poland) Anna Hertel	7–6^{(5)}, 6–3
Win	12–19	Jan 2020	ITF Daytona Beach, US	W25	Clay	(Hungary) Dalma Gálfi	(Argentina) Paula Ormaechea (India) Prarthana Thombare	7–6^{(4)}, 6–2
Win	13–19	Feb 2020	GB Pro-Series Glasgow, UK	W25	Hard (i)	(France) Myrtille Georges	(Belgium) Lara Salden (Denmark) Clara Tauson	7–6^{(2)}, 7–6^{(5)}
Win	14–19	Nov 2020	ITF Ortisei, Italy	W15	Hard (i)	(Netherlands) Suzan Lamens	(Italy) Federica di Sarra (Finland) Anastasia Kulikova	3–6, 6–4, [11–9]
Win	15–19	Nov 2020	ITF Las Palmas, Spain	W25	Clay	(Belgium) Lara Salden	(Netherlands) Suzan Lamens (Netherlands) Eva Vedder	6–1, 6–3
Loss	15–20	Jan 2021	ITF Hamburg, Germany	W25	Hard (i)	(France) Amandine Hesse	(Hungary) Anna Bondár (Slovakia) Tereza Mihalíková	4–6, 4–6
Win	16–20	Feb 2021	Open de Grenoble, France	W25	Clay	(Romania) Ioana Loredana Roșca	(Netherlands) Arianne Hartono (Japan) Yuriko Miyazaki	6–1, 7–5
Win	17–20	May 2021	ITF Prague, Czech Republic	W25	Clay	(Hungary) Anna Bondár	(Switzerland) Xenia Knoll (Romania) Elena-Gabriela Ruse	7–6^{(5)}, 6–2
Loss	17–21	May 2021	Open Saint-Gaudens, France	W60	Hard	(United Kingdom) Eden Silva	(France) Estelle Cascino (France) Jessika Ponchet	6–0, 5–7, [7–10]
Loss	17–22	Jul 2021	Contrexéville Open, France	W100	Clay	(Hungary) Dalma Gálfi	(Kazakhstan) Anna Danilina (Norway) Ulrikke Eikeri	0–6, 6–1, [4–10]
Win	18–22	Apr 2022	Oeiras Ladies Open, Portugal	W80	Clay	(Poland) Katarzyna Piter	(Serbia) Natalija Stevanović (Germany) Katharina Gerlach	6–1, 6–1
