= 2024 Grand Est Open 88 =

Tennis tournament

- Date: 8–14 July
- Edition: 17th
- Category: WTA 125
- Prize money: $115,000
- Surface: Clay
- Location: Contrexéville, France
- Venue: Tennis Club de Contrexéville

Champions

Singles
- (Italy) Lucia Bronzetti

Doubles
- (Georgia (country)) Oksana Kalashnikova / Iryna Shymanovich
| ← 2023 · | Grand Est Open 88 | · 2025 → |

The 2024 Grand Est Open 88 was a professional women's tennis tournament played on outdoor clay courts. It was the seventeenth edition of the tournament, and part of the 2024 WTA 125 tournaments. It took place in Contrexéville, France between 8 and 14 July 2024.

== Singles main-draw entrants ==
=== Seeds ===
| Country | Player | Rank^{1} | Seed |
|---|---|---|---|
| ARG | Nadia Podoroska | 65 | 1 |
| ~~FRA~~ | ~~Varvara Gracheva~~ | ~~70~~ | ~~2~~ |
| EGY | Mayar Sherif | 78 | 3 |
| ITA | Lucia Bronzetti | 81 | 4 |
| BRA | Laura Pigossi | 110 | 5 |
| COL | Emiliana Arango | 122 | 6 |
| NED | Suzan Lamens | 138 | 7 |
| FRA | Elsa Jacquemot | 151 | 8 |
| CRO | Lucija Ćirić Bagarić | 167 | 9 |

- ^{1} Rankings are as of 1 July 2024.

=== Other entrants ===
The following players received wildcards into the singles main draw:

- (France) Audrey Albié
- (France) Amandine Hesse
- (France) Jenny Lim
- (France) Margaux Rouvroy

The following players received entry from the qualifying draw:

- (France) Diana Martynov
- (France) Amandine Monnot
- (Switzerland) Conny Perrin
- Elena Pridankina

The following players received entry as lucky losers:

- (China) Gao Xinyu
- Iryna Shymanovich
- (Germany) Caroline Werner

== Doubles main-draw entrants ==
=== Seeds ===
| Country | Player | Country | Player | Rank^{1} | Seed |
|---|---|---|---|---|---|
| TPE | Wu Fang-hsien | CHN | Zhang Shuai | 111 | 1 |
| GEO | Oksana Kalashnikova | | Iryna Shymanovich | 152 | 2 |

- ^{1} Rankings are as of 1 July 2024.

== Champions ==
=== Singles ===
- (Italy) Lucia Bronzetti def. (Egypt) Mayar Sherif 6–4, 6–7^{(4–7)}, 7–5

=== Doubles ===
- (Georgia (country)) Oksana Kalashnikova / Iryna Shymanovich def. (Chinese Taipei) Wu Fang-hsien / (China) Zhang Shuai 5–7, 6–3, [10–7]
