= 2025 Grand Est Open 88 – Doubles =

Doubles
- 2025 Grand Est Open 88

Final
- Champions: (United States) Quinn Gleason (Brazil) Ingrid Martins
- Runners-up: (United Kingdom) Emily Appleton (Netherlands) Isabelle Haverlag
- Score: 6–1, 7–6^{(7–4)}

Events
Singles	Doubles
← 2024 ·	Grand Est Open 88	· 2026 →

Quinn Gleason and Ingrid Martins won the title, defeating Emily Appleton and Isabelle Haverlag in the final, 6–1, 7–6^{(7–4)}.

Oksana Kalashnikova and Iryna Shymanovich were the reigning champions, but they chose to not compete this year.

== Seeds ==
1. (United States) Quinn Gleason / (Brazil) Ingrid Martins (champions)
2. (United Kingdom) Emily Appleton / (Netherlands) Isabelle Haverlag (final)

== Draw ==
=== Key ===
- Q = Qualifier
- WC = Wild card
- LL = Lucky loser
- Alt = Alternate
- ITF = ITF entry
- PR = Protected ranking
- SR = Special ranking
- SE = Special exempt
- JE = Junior exempt
- JR = Junior Accelerator Programme entrant
- CO = College Accelerator Programme entrant
- NG = Next Gen Accelerator Program entrant
- w/o = Walkover
- r = Retired
- d = Defaulted

=== Draw ===
Quarterfinals
1	(United States) Q Gleason (Brazil) I Martins	6	6
A Anshba (Spain) A Bolsova	4	2
(France) E Cascino (France) C Monnet	3	1
(Spain) Y Cavallé Reimers (Spain) A Herrero Liñana	6	6
(Spain) Á Fita Boluda (Brazil) L Pigossi	3	6	[10]
(Italy) N Fossa Huergo (Belgium) M Kempen	6	3	[7]
(Andorra) V Jiménez Kasintseva (Serbia) L Radivojević	4	6^{0}
2	(United Kingdom) E Appleton (Netherlands) I Haverlag	6	7^{7}

Semifinals
1	(United States) Q Gleason (Brazil) I Martins	6	5	[10]
(Spain) Y Cavallé Reimers (Spain) A Herrero Liñana	3	7	[4]
(Spain) Á Fita Boluda (Brazil) L Pigossi	5	4
2	(United Kingdom) E Appleton (Netherlands) I Haverlag	7	6

Final
1	(United States) Q Gleason (Brazil) I Martins	6	7^{7}
2	(United Kingdom) E Appleton (Netherlands) I Haverlag	1	6^{4}
