= 2025 Grand Est Open 88 – Singles =

Singles
- 2025 Grand Est Open 88

Final
- Champion: (United Kingdom) Francesca Jones
- Runner-up: (France) Elsa Jacquemot
- Score: 6–4, 7–6^{7–2}

Events
Singles	Doubles
← 2024 ·	Grand Est Open 88	· 2026 →

Francesca Jones won the title, defeating Elsa Jacquemot in the final, 6–4, 7–6^{7–2}.

Lucia Bronzetti was the reigning champion, but she chose to compete in Båstad instead.

== Seeds ==
1. (France) Varvara Gracheva (quarterfinals)
2. (France) Léolia Jeanjean (first round)
3. (Switzerland) Rebeka Masarova (quarterfinals, retired)
4. (France) Elsa Jacquemot (final)
5. (United Kingdom) Francesca Jones (champion)
6. (Switzerland) Simona Waltert (quarterfinals)
7. (Andorra) Victoria Jiménez Kasintseva (second round)
8. Oksana Selekhmeteva (semifinals)

== Draw ==
Key

- Q = Qualifier
- WC = Wild card
- LL = Lucky loser
- Alt = Alternate
- ITF = ITF entry
- PR = Protected ranking
- SR = Special ranking
- SE = Special exempt
- JE = Junior exempt
- JR = Junior Accelerator Programme entrant
- CO = College Accelerator Programme entrant
- NG = Next Gen Accelerator Program entrant
- w/o = Walkover
- r = Retired
- d = Defaulted

=== Finals ===
Semifinals
8	Oksana Selekhmeteva	6	6^{0}	6^{0}
4	(France) Elsa Jacquemot	3	7^{7}	7^{7}
5	(United Kingdom) Francesca Jones	7^{7}	6
(Croatia) Petra Marčinko	6^{4}	3

Final
4	(France) Elsa Jacquemot	4	6^{2}
5	(United Kingdom) Francesca Jones	6	7^{7}

=== Top half ===
First round
1	(France) V Gracheva	6	6
WC	(France) M Rouvroy	4	2
(Argentina) J Riera	5	6	6
Q	(France) M Lollia	7	3	1
(Romania) M Bulgaru	5	4
Q	E Kazionova	7	6
Q	(Spain) K Quevedo	6	2	4
8	O Selekhmeteva	3	6	6
4	(France) E Jacquemot	6	7
(Switzerland) S Bandecchi	2	5
(Italy) G Pedone	2	7^{7}	3
(Liechtenstein) K von Deichmann	6	6^{5}	6
WC	(France) S Janicijevic	3	5
A Charaeva	6	7
(Austria) S Kraus	4	1
6	(Switzerland) S Waltert	6	6

Second round
1	(France) V Gracheva	6	6
(Argentina) J Riera	4	4
Q	E Kazionova	1	3
8	O Selekhmeteva	6	6
4	(France) E Jacquemot	3	6	6
(Liechtenstein) K von Deichmann	6	2	2
A Charaeva	5	4
6	(Switzerland) S Waltert	7	6

Quarterfinals
1	(France) V Gracheva	5	3
8	O Selekhmeteva	7	6
4	(France) E Jacquemot	2	6	6
6	(Switzerland) S Waltert	6	2	4

Semifinals
8	O Selekhmeteva	6	6^{0}	6^{0}
4	(France) E Jacquemot	3	7^{7}	7^{7}

=== Bottom half ===
First round
5	(United Kingdom) F Jones	6	7
(France) T Andrianjafitrimo	1	5
WC	(France) J Belgraver	2	2
(France) C Monnet	6	6
(France) T Rakotomanga Rajaonah	3	6	1
(Brazil) L Pigossi	6	4	6
Q	(Spain) Á Fita Boluda	3	3
3	(Switzerland) R Masarova	6	6
7	(Andorra) V Jiménez Kasintseva	6	6
(Netherlands) A Koevermans	3	1
(Japan) S Saito	2	1
(Croatia) P Marčinko	6	6
(Serbia) L Radivojević	6	7
PR	(Spain) A Bolsova	4	5
WC	(France) A Hesse	6	3	6
2	(France) L Jeanjean	2	6	3

Second round
5	(United Kingdom) F Jones	6	6
(France) C Monnet	1	2
(Brazil) L Pigossi	2	1
3	(Switzerland) R Masarova	6	6
7	(Andorra) V Jiménez Kasintseva	5	4
(Croatia) P Marčinko	7	6
(Serbia) L Radivojević	6	6
WC	(France) A Hesse	4	0

Quarterfinals
5	(United Kingdom) F Jones	2	6	0
3	(Switzerland) R Masarova	6	2	0^{r}
(Croatia) P Marčinko	6	6
(Serbia) L Radivojević	4	2

Semifinals
5	(United Kingdom) F Jones	7^{7}	6
(Croatia) P Marčinko	6^{4}	3

== Qualifying ==
=== Seeds ===
1. (Spain) Ángela Fita Boluda (qualified)
2. (Spain) Kaitlin Quevedo (qualified)
3. (Burundi) Sada Nahimana (first round)
4. (Brazil) Carolina Alves (first round)
5. (Bulgaria) Lia Karatantcheva (first round)
6. (Italy) Nicole Fossa Huergo (qualifying competition)
7. (Italy) Silvia Ambrosio (qualifying competition)
8. (Germany) Caroline Werner (qualifying competition)

=== Qualifiers ===
1. (Spain) Ángela Fita Boluda
2. (Spain) Kaitlin Quevedo
3. (France) Mathilde Lollia
4. Ekaterina Kazionova

=== Qualifying draw ===
==== First qualifier ====
First round
1	(Spain) Ángela Fita Boluda	6	6
(Australia) Tina Nadine Smith	1	1
(Germany) Mina Hodzic	4	1
6	(Italy) Nicole Fossa Huergo	6	6

Qualifying competition
1	(Spain) Ángela Fita Boluda	6	6
6	(Italy) Nicole Fossa Huergo	2	0

==== Second qualifier ====
First round
2	(Spain) Kaitlin Quevedo	6	6
(France) Diana Martynov	4	2
(Italy) Diletta Cherubini	3	5
7	(Italy) Silvia Ambrosio	6	7

Qualifying competition
2	(Spain) Kaitlin Quevedo	7^{8}	6
7	(Italy) Silvia Ambrosio	6^{6}	4

==== Third qualifier ====
First round
3	(Burundi) Sada Nahimana	6	4	3
(Spain) Alicia Herrero Liñana	3	6	6
WC	(France) Mathilde Lollia	6^{9}	6	6
5	(Bulgaria) Lia Karatantcheva	7^{11}	3	3

Qualifying competition
(Spain) Alicia Herrero Liñana	6^{5}	4
WC	(France) Mathilde Lollia	7^{7}	6

==== Fourth qualifier ====
First round
4	(Brazil) Carolina Alves	4	4
Ekaterina Kazionova	6	6
WC	(France) Sarah Iliev	1	3
8	(Germany) Caroline Werner	6	6

Qualifying competition
Ekaterina Kazionova	5	7	6
8	(Germany) Caroline Werner	7	5	2
