= 2022 Grand Est Open 88 =

Tennis tournament

- Date: 4–10 July
- Edition: 15th
- Category: WTA 125
- Prize money: $115,000
- Surface: Clay
- Location: Contrexéville, France
- Venue: Tennis Club de Contrexéville

Champions

Singles
- (Italy) Sara Errani

Doubles
- (Norway) Ulrikke Eikeri / (Slovakia) Tereza Mihalíková
← 2021 ·	Grand Est Open 88	· 2023 →

The 2022 Grand Est Open 88 was a professional women's tennis tournament played on outdoor clay courts. It was the fifteenth edition of the tournament and first ever as a WTA 125 event, which is also part of the 2022 WTA 125 tournaments. It took place in Contrexéville, France between 4 and 10 July 2022.

== Singles main-draw entrants ==
=== Seeds ===
Country	Player	Rank^{1}	Seed
HUN	Anna Bondár	64	1
	Varvara Gracheva	69	2
ITA	Jasmine Paolini	72	3
FRA	Océane Dodin	85	4
NED	Arantxa Rus	86	5
HUN	Dalma Gálfi	89	6
SUI	Ylena In-Albon	113	7
USA	Katie Volynets	117	8

- ^{1} Rankings are as of 27 June 2022.

=== Other entrants ===
The following players received wildcards into the singles main draw:

- (France) Audrey Albié
- (France) Julie Gervais
- (France) Margaux Rouvroy
- (Switzerland) Stefanie Vögele

The following player received entry using a protected ranking:

- (Australia) Zoe Hives

The following players received entry from the qualifying draw:

- Erika Andreeva
- (Germany) Lena Papadakis
- (France) Alice Robbe
- (Italy) Camilla Rosatello

=== Withdrawals ===
Before the tournament

- (France) Tessah Andrianjafitrimo → replaced by (Mexico) Fernanda Contreras Gómez
- (Romania) Ana Bogdan → replaced by (Australia) Olivia Gadecki
- (Germany) Tamara Korpatsch → replaced by (Italy) Sara Errani
- (Germany) Tatjana Maria → replaced by Oksana Selekhmeteva
- (France) Diane Parry → replaced by (France) Elsa Jacquemot
- (France) Harmony Tan → replaced by (Argentina) María Lourdes Carlé

== Doubles main-draw entrants ==
=== Seeds ===
Country	Player	Country	Player	Rank^{1}	Seed
NOR	Ulrikke Eikeri	SVK	Tereza Mihalíková	111	1
CHN	Han Xinyun		Alexandra Panova	178	2

- ^{1} Rankings are as of 27 June 2022.

=== Other entrants ===
The following pair received a wildcard into the doubles main draw:

- (France) Alice Robbe / (France) Margaux Rouvroy

== Champions ==
=== Singles ===
- (Italy) Sara Errani def. (Hungary) Dalma Gálfi 6–4, 1–6, 7–6^{(7–4)}

=== Doubles ===
- (Norway) Ulrikke Eikeri / (Slovakia) Tereza Mihalíková def. (China) Han Xinyun / Alexandra Panova 7–6^{(10–8)}, 6–2
