= 2023 Grand Est Open 88 =

Tennis tournament

- Date: 10–16 July
- Edition: 16th
- Category: WTA 125
- Prize money: $115,000
- Surface: Clay
- Location: Contrexéville, France
- Venue: Tennis Club de Contrexéville

Champions

Singles
- (Netherlands) Arantxa Rus

Doubles
- (Spain) Cristina Bucșa / Alena Fomina-Klotz
← 2022 ·	Grand Est Open 88	· 2024 →

The 2023 Grand Est Open 88 was a professional women's tennis tournament played on outdoor clay courts. It was the sixteenth edition of the tournament and second as a WTA 125 event, which is also part of the 2023 WTA 125 tournaments. It took place in Contrexéville, France between 10 and 16 July 2023.

== Singles main-draw entrants ==
=== Seeds ===
Country	Player	Rank^{1}	Seed
GER	Tatjana Maria	62	1
ESP	Cristina Bucșa	78	2
ITA	Sara Errani	79	3
NED	Arantxa Rus	86	4
GER	Anna-Lena Friedsam	87	5
FRA	Diane Parry	96	6
FRA	Clara Burel	104	7
	Anastasia Pavlyuchenkova	119	8

- ^{1} Rankings are as of 3 July 2023.

=== Other entrants ===
The following players received wildcards into the singles main draw:

- (France) Tessah Andrianjafitrimo
- (France) Fiona Ferro
- (France) Amandine Hesse
- (France) Margaux Rouvroy

The following players received entry from the qualifying draw:

- (Slovenia) Dalila Jakupović
- (United States) Elvina Kalieva
- (Czech Republic) Tereza Martincová
- Anastasia Tikhonova

The following players received entry as a lucky loser:

- (Spain) Rosa Vicens Mas

=== Withdrawals ===
- Mirra Andreeva → replaced by (France) Elsa Jacquemot
- (Hungary) Dalma Gálfi → replaced by (Spain) Rosa Vicens Mas
- (Montenegro) Danka Kovinić → replaced by (Greece) Despina Papamichail
- (Germany) Jule Niemeier → replaced by (Romania) Irina Bara
- (France) Jessika Ponchet → replaced by (France) Kristina Mladenovic
- (Italy) Lucrezia Stefanini → replaced by Maria Timofeeva

== Doubles main-draw entrants ==
=== Seeds ===
Country	Player	Country	Player	Rank^{1}	Seed
	Alexandra Panova	NED	Bibiane Schoofs	163	1
ESP	Cristina Bucșa		Alena Fomina-Klotz	198	2

- ^{1} Rankings are as of 3 July 2023.

== Champions ==
=== Singles ===
- (Netherlands) Arantxa Rus def. Anastasia Pavlyuchenkova 6–3, 6–3

=== Doubles ===
- (Spain) Cristina Bucșa / Alena Fomina-Klotz def. Amina Anshba / (Czech Republic) Anastasia Dețiuc 4–6, 6–3, [10–7]
