= 2021 Grand Est Open 88 =

Tennis tournament

- Date: 5–11 July 2021
- Edition: 14th
- Category: ITF Women's World Tennis Tour
- Prize money: $100,000
- Surface: Clay
- Location: Contrexéville, France

Champions

Singles
- (Ukraine) Anhelina Kalinina

Doubles
- (Kazakhstan) Anna Danilina / (Norway) Ulrikke Eikeri
← 2019 ·	Grand Est Open 88	· 2022 →

The 2021 Grand Est Open 88 was a professional women's tennis tournament played on outdoor clay courts. It was the fourteenth edition of the tournament which was part of the 2021 ITF Women's World Tennis Tour. It took place in Contrexéville, France between 5 and 11 July 2021.

== Singles main-draw entrants ==
=== Seeds ===
Country	Player	Rank^{1}	Seed
ITA	Martina Trevisan	98	1
FRA	Océane Dodin	113	2
SUI	Stefanie Vögele	121	3
UKR	Anhelina Kalinina	125	4
HUN	Réka Luca Jani	181	5
CHN	Zheng Qinwen	194	6
CRO	Jana Fett	200	7
HUN	Dalma Gálfi	205	8

- ^{1} Rankings are as of 28 June 2021.

=== Other entrants ===
The following players received wildcards into the singles main draw:

- (France) Loïs Boisson
- (France) Elsa Jacquemot
- (France) Marine Partaud
- (France) Lucie Wargnier

The following player received entry using a protected ranking:

- (China) Yuan Yue

The following players received entry from the qualifying draw:

- (Latvia) Kamilla Bartone
- (France) Émeline Dartron
- (Poland) Weronika Falkowska
- (France) Léolia Jeanjean
- (Germany) Lena Papadakis
- (France) Margaux Rouvroy
- (Russia) Oksana Selekhmeteva
- (Ukraine) Valeriya Strakhova

== Champions ==
=== Singles ===
- (Ukraine) Anhelina Kalinina def. (Hungary) Dalma Gálfi, 6–2, 6–2

=== Doubles ===
- (Kazakhstan) Anna Danilina / (Norway) Ulrikke Eikeri def. (Hungary) Dalma Gálfi / (Belgium) Kimberley Zimmermann, 6–0, 1–6, [10–4]
