= 2021 Grand Est Open 88 – Singles =

Singles
- 2021 Grand Est Open 88

Final
- Champion: (Ukraine) Anhelina Kalinina
- Runner-up: (Hungary) Dalma Gálfi
- Score: 6–2, 6–2

Events
Singles	Doubles
← 2019 ·	Grand Est Open 88	· 2022 →

Katarina Zavatska was the defending champion but chose not to participate.

Anhelina Kalinina won the title, defeating Dalma Gálfi in the final, 6–2, 6–2.

== Seeds ==
1. (Italy) Martina Trevisan (first round)
2. (France) Océane Dodin (quarterfinals)
3. (Switzerland) Stefanie Vögele (first round)
4. (Ukraine) Anhelina Kalinina (champion)
5. (Hungary) Réka Luca Jani (first round)
6. (China) Zheng Qinwen (semifinals)
7. (Croatia) Jana Fett (second round, retired)
8. (Hungary) Dalma Gálfi (final)

== Draw ==
=== Key ===
- Q = Qualifier
- WC = Wild card
- LL = Lucky loser
- Alt = Alternate
- SE = Special exempt
- PR = Protected ranking
- ITF = ITF entry
- JE = Junior exempt
- w/o = Walkover
- r = Retired
- d = Defaulted
- SR = Special ranking

=== Finals ===
Semifinals
(France) Amandine Hesse	6^{3}	4
8	(Hungary) Dalma Gálfi	7^{7}	6
4	(Ukraine) Anhelina Kalinina	6	6
6	(China) Zheng Qinwen	4	4

Final
8	(Hungary) Dalma Gálfi	2	2
4	(Ukraine) Anhelina Kalinina	6	6

=== Top half ===
First round
1	(Italy) M Trevisan	6	3	2
Q	(Russia) O Selekhmeteva	1	6	6
(France) A Hesse	6	6
Q	(France) É Dartron	2	1
Q	(Latvia) K Bartone	6	3
(Romania) I Fetecău	3	0^{r}
Q	(Ukraine) V Strakhova	0	7^{7}	5
7	(Croatia) J Fett	6	6^{4}	7
3	(Switzerland) S Vögele	2	4
Q	(France) L Jeanjean	6	6
(United States) J Loeb	4	1
(Kazakhstan) A Danilina	6	6
(Norway) U Eikeri	4	6	4
(Bulgaria) E Kostova	6	3	6
WC	(France) M Partaud	1	4
8	(Hungary) D Gálfi	6	6

Second round
Q	(Russia) O Selekhmeteva	6^{5}	1
(France) A Hesse	7^{7}	6
Q	(Latvia) K Bartone	6	2
7	(Croatia) J Fett	1	1^{r}
Q	(France) L Jeanjean	6	6
(Kazakhstan) A Danilina	2	4
(Bulgaria) E Kostova	6^{2}	1
8	(Hungary) D Gálfi	7^{7}	6

Quarterfinals
(France) A Hesse	6	6
Q	(Latvia) K Bartone	2	1
Q	(France) L Jeanjean	1	0
8	(Hungary) D Gálfi	6	6

Semifinals
(France) A Hesse	6^{3}	4
8	(Hungary) D Gálfi	7^{7}	6

=== Bottom half ===
First round
5	(Hungary) RL Jani	2	7^{7}	4
WC	(France) E Jacquemot	6	6^{4}	6
Q	(Poland) W Falkowska	0	3
PR	(China) Y Yuan	6	6
(Italy) J Pieri	4	1
WC	(France) L Boisson	6	6
(Chile) D Seguel	7^{7}	2	4
4	(Ukraine) A Kalinina	6^{4}	6	6
6	(China) Q Zheng	7	7^{7}
(France) M Yerolymos	5	6^{2}
(Netherlands) A Hartono	3	6	1
(Japan) YL Miyazaki	6	2	6
Q	(Germany) L Papadakis	4	2
Q	(France) M Rouvroy	6	6
WC	(France) L Wargnier	5	3
2	(France) O Dodin	7	6

Second round
WC	(France) E Jacquemot	6	5	6
PR	(China) Y Yuan	2	7	1
WC	(France) L Boisson	2	1
4	(Ukraine) A Kalinina	6	6
6	(China) Q Zheng	7^{7}	6
(Japan) YL Miyazaki	6^{3}	2
Q	(France) M Rouvroy	4	2
2	(France) O Dodin	6	6

Quarterfinals
WC	(France) E Jacquemot	7^{9}	0	1
4	(Ukraine) A Kalinina	6^{7}	6	6
6	(China) Q Zheng	6	6
2	(France) O Dodin	2	1

Semifinals
4	(Ukraine) A Kalinina	6	6
6	(China) Q Zheng	4	4
