= Contrex =

Mineral water brand

- Country: France
- Produced by: Nestlé Waters
- Source: Contrexéville
- Type: still
- pH: 7.4
- Calcium (Ca): 468
- Chloride (Cl): 7.6
- Bicarbonate (HCO_{3}): 372.0
- Fluoride (F): 0.36
- Magnesium (Mg): 74.5
- Nitrate (NO_{3}): 2.7
- Potassium (K): 2.8
- Sodium (Na): 9.4
- Sulfate (SO_{4}): 1121
- TDS: 2078
- Website: www.contrex.fr
- All concentrations in milligrams per liter (mg/L); pH without units

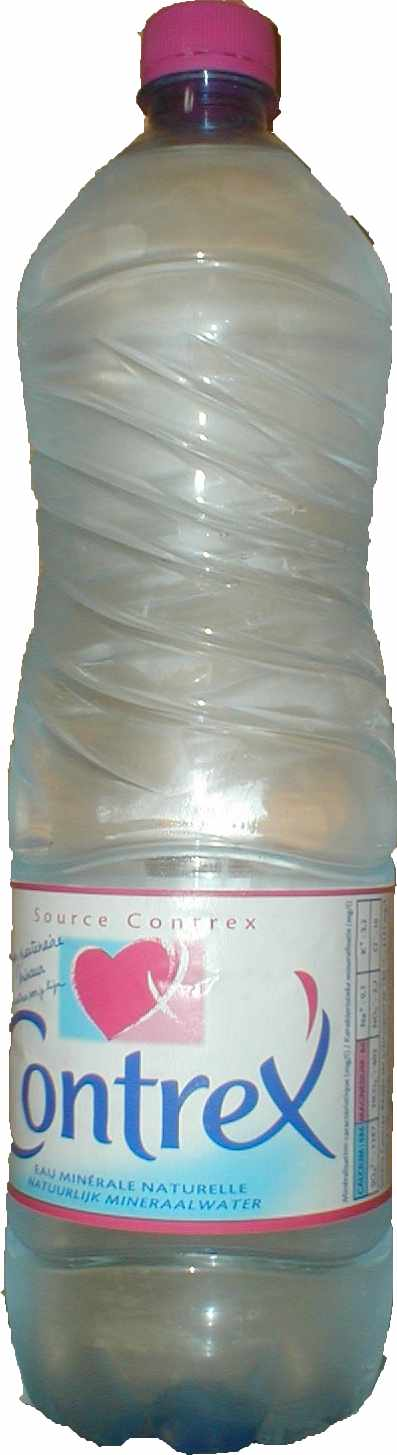
A bottle of Contrex water

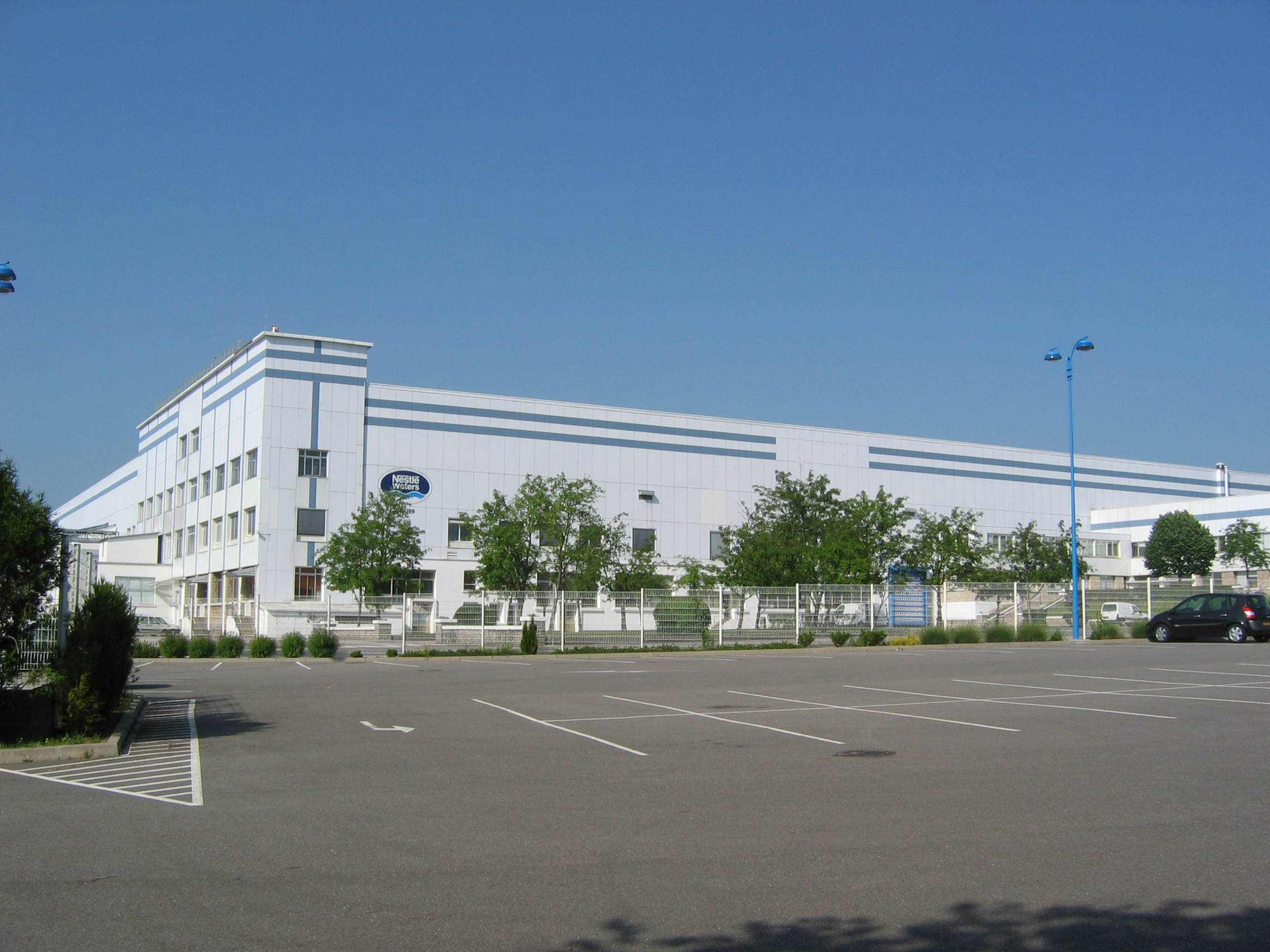
Bottling factory, Contrexéville

Contrex is a brand of mineral water owned since 1992 by Nestlé Waters, a branch of the Swiss group Nestlé, and is part of the Vittel mineral water company that includes Vittel and Hépar. The water, whose source is located in Contrexéville in the French département of Vosges, was discovered by Charles Bagard, the first doctor of Louis XV.

== Information ==
The water is bottled in a 250,000 m^{2} factory complex that employs around 900 people. 635 million bottles of all kinds are produced a year, of which 11% are exported. The bottling factory is connected by pipelines with the Vittel factory in Vittel, a few kilometers from Contrexéville, which permits bottling of the Contrex water in either Vittel or in Contrexéville.

Contrex is a highly mineralized water and has diuretic properties.
