= 2024 Grand Est Open 88 – Singles =

Singles
- 2024 Grand Est Open 88

Final
- Champion: (Italy) Lucia Bronzetti
- Runner-up: (Egypt) Mayar Sherif
- Score: 6–4, 6–7^{(4–7)}, 7–5

Events
Singles	Doubles
← 2023 ·	Grand Est Open 88	· 2025 →

Lucia Bronzetti won the title, defeating Mayar Sherif in the final, 6–4, 6–7^{(4–7)}, 7–5.

Arantxa Rus was the reigning champion, but chose not to participate this year.

== Seeds ==
1. (Argentina) Nadia Podoroska (first round)
2. (France) Varvara Gracheva (withdrew)
3. (Egypt) Mayar Sherif (final)
4. (Italy) Lucia Bronzetti (champion)
5. (Brazil) Laura Pigossi (second round)
6. (Colombia) Emiliana Arango (quarterfinals)
7. (Netherlands) Suzan Lamens (second round)
8. (France) Elsa Jacquemot (quarterfinals)
9. (Croatia) Lucija Ćirić Bagarić (first round)

== Draw ==
=== Key ===
- Q = Qualifier
- WC = Wild card
- LL = Lucky loser
- Alt = Alternate
- SE = Special exempt
- PR = Protected ranking
- ITF = ITF entry
- JE = Junior exempt
- w/o = Walkover
- r = Retired
- d = Defaulted
- SR = Special ranking

=== Finals ===
Semifinals
LL	(China) Gao Xinyu	2	1
4	(Italy) Lucia Bronzetti	6	6
3	(Egypt) Mayar Sherif	4	7	7^{7}
(France) Séléna Janicijevic	6	5	6^{4}

Final
4	(Italy) Lucia Bronzetti	6	6^{4}	7
3	(Egypt) Mayar Sherif	4	7^{7}	5

=== Top half ===
First round
1	(Argentina) N Podoroska	6	3	3
Q	(France) D Martynov	2	6	6
(Portugal) F Jorge	4	1
WC	(France) M Rouvroy	6	6
(Serbia) L Radivojević	0	4
LL	(China) X Gao	6	6
LL	I Shymanovich	3	6	4
5	(Brazil) L Pigossi	6	0	6
4	(Italy) L Bronzetti	6	6
(Switzerland) S Waltert	1	2
(Ukraine) K Baindl	7^{7}	6
(France) C Monnet	6^{4}	1
(Romania) A Mitu	6	7^{11}
Q	(France) A Monnot	2	6^{9}
Q	E Pridankina	6	4	6^{0}
8	(France) E Jacquemot	4	6	7^{7}

Second round
Q	(France) D Martynov	3	1
WC	(France) M Rouvroy	6	6
LL	(China) X Gao	6	5	6
5	(Brazil) L Pigossi	2	7	2
4	(Italy) L Bronzetti	7	5	6
(Ukraine) K Baindl	5	7	3
(Romania) A Mitu	3	0
8	(France) E Jacquemot	6	6

Quarterfinals
WC	(France) M Rouvroy	4	5
LL	(China) X Gao	6	7
4	(Italy) L Bronzetti	4	6	6
8	(France) E Jacquemot	6	3	4

Semifinals
LL	(China) X Gao	2	1
4	(Italy) L Bronzetti	6	6

=== Bottom half ===
First round
6	(Colombia) E Arango	6	4	6
Q	(Switzerland) C Perrin	3	6	2
(Lithuania) J Mikulskytė	6	2	0
LL	(Germany) C Werner	3	6	6
(United States) M Mateas	6	7^{7}
(Germany) N Noha Akugue	2	6^{1}
P Kudermetova	2	0^{r}
3	(Egypt) M Sherif	6	1
7	(Netherlands) S Lamens	6	7^{8}
WC	(France) J Lim	2	6^{6}
(France) S Janicijevic	6	6
WC	(France) A Hesse	1	3
(Spain) L Romero Gormaz	7	5	6
WC	(France) A Albié	5	7	3
(Slovenia) D Jakupović	6	6
9	(Croatia) L Ćirić Bagarić	1	3

Second round
6	(Colombia) E Arango	6	6
LL	(Germany) C Werner	1	1
(United States) M Mateas	1	1
3	(Egypt) M Sherif	6	6
7	(Netherlands) S Lamens	4	4
(France) S Janicijevic	6	6
(Spain) L Romero Gormaz	6	6^{3}	6^{4}
(Slovenia) D Jakupović	3	7^{7}	7^{7}

Quarterfinals
6	(Colombia) E Arango	4	2
3	(Egypt) M Sherif	6	6
(France) S Janicijevic	2	6	6
(Slovenia) D Jakupović	6	2	3

Semifinals
3	(Egypt) M Sherif	4	7	7^{7}
(France) S Janicijevic	6	5	6^{4}

== Qualifying ==
=== Seeds ===
1. (China) Gao Xinyu (qualifying competition, lucky loser)
2. Iryna Shymanovich (qualifying competition, lucky loser)
3. (Lithuania) Justina Mikulskytė (moved to main draw)
4. Elena Pridankina (qualified)
5. (Serbia) Lola Radivojević (moved to main draw)
6. (Italy) Camilla Rosatello (first round)
7. (Italy) Miriana Tona (first round)
8. (Australia) Tina Smith (qualifying competition)

=== Qualifiers ===
1. (Switzerland) Conny Perrin
2. (France) Amandine Monnot
3. (France) Diana Martynov
4. Elena Pridankina

=== Lucky losers ===
1. (China) Gao Xinyu
2. Iryna Shymanovich
3. (Germany) Caroline Werner

=== Qualifying draw ===
==== First qualifier ====
First round				Qualifying competition
				1	(China) Gao Xinyu	3	2
					(Switzerland) Conny Perrin	6	6
	(Switzerland) Conny Perrin	7^{11}	6		(Switzerland) Conny Perrin	6	6
6	(Italy) Camilla Rosatello	6^{9}	4

==== Second qualifier ====
First round					Qualifying competition
					2	Iryna Shymanovich	3	6	3
						(France) Amandine Monnot	6	1	6
	(France) Amandine Monnot	6	4	6		(France) Amandine Monnot	6	1	6
7	(Italy) Miriana Tona	0	6	2

==== Third qualifier ====
First round				Qualifying competition
					(France) Diana Martynov	4	6	6
				8	(Australia) Tina Smith	6	2	3
	(China) Tang Qianhui	3	4	8	(Australia) Tina Smith	6	2	3
8	(Australia) Tina Smith	6	6

==== Fourth qualifier ====
First round					Qualifying competition
4	Elena Pridankina	6	3	6
WC	(France) Yaroslava Bartashevich	1	6	2
WC	(France) Yaroslava Bartashevich	1	6	2	4	Elena Pridankina	7	3	6
						(Germany) Caroline Werner	5	6	1
