= 2022 Grand Est Open 88 – Doubles =

Doubles
- 2022 Grand Est Open 88

Final
- Champions: (Norway) Ulrikke Eikeri (Slovakia) Tereza Mihalíková
- Runners-up: (China) Han Xinyun; Alexandra Panova
- Score: 7–6^{(10–8)}, 6–2

Events
Singles	Doubles
← 2021 ·	Grand Est Open 88	· 2023 →

Anna Danilina and Ulrikke Eikeri were the defending champions, but Danilina chose not to participate. Eikeri partnered alongside Tereza Mihalíková and successfully defended her title, defeating Han Xinyun and Alexandra Panova in the final, 7–6^{(10–8)}, 6–2.

== Seeds ==
1. (Norway) Ulrikke Eikeri / (Slovakia) Tereza Mihalíková (champions)
2. (China) Han Xinyun / Alexandra Panova (final)

== Draw ==
=== Key ===
- Q = Qualifier
- WC = Wild card
- LL = Lucky loser
- Alt = Alternate
- SE = Special exempt
- PR = Protected ranking
- ITF = ITF entry
- JE = Junior exempt
- w/o = Walkover
- r = Retired
- d = Defaulted
- SR = Special ranking

=== Draw ===
Quarterfinals
1	(Norway) U Eikeri (Slovakia) T Mihalíková	6	6
A Blinkova; V Gracheva	4	3
SR	(Germany) J Lohoff (Romania) LI Paar	7^{8}	6
WC	(France) A Robbe (France) M Rouvroy	6^{6}	2
(Spain) C Bucșa (Georgia (country)) O Kalashnikova	2	6^{5}
(France) E Cascino (France) J Ponchet	6	7^{7}
(Netherlands) A Rus; O Selekhmeteva	4	6	[6]
2	(China) X Han; A Panova	6	3	[10]

Semifinals
1	(Norway) U Eikeri (Slovakia) T Mihalíková	6	6
SR	(Germany) J Lohoff (Romania) LI Paar	2	1
(France) E Cascino (France) J Ponchet	2	6^{6}
2	(China) X Han; A Panova	6	7^{8}

Final
1	(Norway) U Eikeri (Slovakia) T Mihalíková	7^{10}	6
2	(China) X Han; A Panova	6^{8}	2
