= 2023 Grand Est Open 88 – Doubles =

Doubles
- 2023 Grand Est Open 88

Final
- Champions: (Spain) Cristina Bucșa; Alena Fomina-Klotz
- Runners-up: Amina Anshba (Czech Republic) Anastasia Dețiuc
- Score: 4–6, 6–3, [10–7]

Events
| Singles | Doubles |
| ← 2022 · | Grand Est Open 88 | · 2024 → |

Ulrikke Eikeri and Tereza Mihalíková were the defending champions, but chose not to participate this year.

Cristina Bucșa and Alena Fomina-Klotz won the title, defeating Amina Anshba and Anastasia Dețiuc in the final, 4–6, 6–3, [10–7].

== Seeds ==
1. Alexandra Panova / (Netherlands) Bibiane Schoofs (quarterfinals)
2. (Spain) Cristina Bucșa / Alena Fomina-Klotz (champions)

== Draw ==
=== Key ===
- Q = Qualifier
- WC = Wild card
- LL = Lucky loser
- Alt = Alternate
- SE = Special exempt
- PR = Protected ranking
- ITF = ITF entry
- JE = Junior exempt
- w/o = Walkover
- r = Retired
- d = Defaulted
- SR = Special ranking

=== Draw ===
Quarterfinals
1 | A Panova (Netherlands) B Schoofs | 2 | 2
(France) A Hesse (France) K Mladenovic | 6 | 6
A Anshba (Czech Republic) A Dețiuc | 7^{7} | 6
(France) E Jacquemot (France) M Rouvroy | 6^{3} | 2
(France) D Parry (Netherlands) A Rus | 6 | 6
(Argentina) ML Carlé (Brazil) L Pigossi | 4 | 3
(France) C Burel; S Lansere | 3 | 6 | [6]
2 | (Spain) C Bucșa; A Fomina-Klotz | 6 | 2 | [10]

Semifinals
(France) A Hesse (France) K Mladenovic | 6 | 4 | [4]
A Anshba (Czech Republic) A Dețiuc | 1 | 6 | [10]
(France) D Parry (Netherlands) A Rus
2 | (Spain) C Bucșa; A Fomina-Klotz | w/o

Final
A Anshba (Czech Republic) A Dețiuc | 6 | 3 | [7]
2 | (Spain) C Bucșa; A Fomina-Klotz | 4 | 6 | [10]
