= 2022 Grand Est Open 88 – Singles =

Singles
- 2022 Grand Est Open 88

Final
- Champion: (Italy) Sara Errani
- Runner-up: (Hungary) Dalma Gálfi
- Score: 6–4, 1–6, 7–6^{(7–4)}

Events
Singles	Doubles
← 2021 ·	Grand Est Open 88	· 2023 →

Anhelina Kalinina was the defending champion but chose not to participate.

Sara Errani won the title, defeating Dalma Gálfi in the final, 6–4, 1–6, 7–6^{(7–4)}.

== Seeds ==
1. (Hungary) Anna Bondár (semifinals)
2. Varvara Gracheva (first round)
3. (Italy) Jasmine Paolini (quarterfinals)
4. (France) Océane Dodin (first round)
5. (Netherlands) Arantxa Rus (second round)
6. (Hungary) Dalma Gálfi (final)
7. (Switzerland) Ylena In-Albon (first round)
8. (United States) Katie Volynets (first round)

== Draw ==
=== Key ===
- Q = Qualifier
- WC = Wild card
- LL = Lucky loser
- Alt = Alternate
- SE = Special exempt
- PR = Protected ranking
- ITF = ITF entry
- JE = Junior exempt
- w/o = Walkover
- r = Retired
- d = Defaulted
- SR = Special ranking

=== Finals ===
Semifinals
1	(Hungary) Anna Bondár	3	1
6	(Hungary) Dalma Gálfi	6	6
(Spain) Cristina Bucșa	3	2
(Italy) Sara Errani	6	6

Final
6	(Hungary) Dalma Gálfi	4	6	6^{4}
(Italy) Sara Errani	6	1	7^{7}

=== Top half ===
First round
1	(Hungary) A Bondár	6	6
(Brazil) L Pigossi	4	2
Q	(Germany) L Papadakis	3	6	6
PR	(Australia) Z Hives	6	3	3
WC	(France) A Albié	5	3
(Australia) O Gadecki	7	6
(France) E Jacquemot	6	3	6
8	(United States) K Volynets	4	6	2
3	(Italy) J Paolini	0	6	6
(United States) B Pera	6	2	1
WC	(Switzerland) S Vögele	1	3
A Blinkova	6	6
WC	(France) M Rouvroy	4	1
(Romania) A Cadanțu-Ignatik	6	6
(France) K Mladenovic	7^{7}	4	3
6	(Hungary) D Gálfi	6^{5}	6	6

Second round
1	(Hungary) A Bondár	6	6
Q	(Germany) L Papadakis	2	2
(Australia) O Gadecki	6	6
(France) E Jacquemot	2	1
3	(Italy) J Paolini	6	6
A Blinkova	0	3
(Romania) A Cadanțu-Ignatik	4	4
6	(Hungary) D Gálfi	6	6

Quarterfinals
1	(Hungary) A Bondár	4	6	6
(Australia) O Gadecki	6	3	2
3	(Italy) J Paolini	5	0
6	(Hungary) D Gálfi	7	6

Semifinals
1	(Hungary) A Bondár	3	1
6	(Hungary) D Gálfi	6	6

=== Bottom half ===
First round
5	(Netherlands) A Rus	6	6
WC	(France) J Gervais	0	3
(Spain) C Bucșa	6	6
(Argentina) ML Carlé	2	3
(Spain) A Lázaro García	1	6	3
(France) J Ponchet	6	4	6
Q	E Andreeva	6	7^{7}
4	(France) O Dodin	3	6^{5}
7	(Switzerland) Y In-Albon	6^{5}	4
Q	(France) A Robbe	7^{7}	6
(Mexico) F Contreras Gómez	6^{4}	6^{1}
Q	(Italy) C Rosatello	7^{7}	7^{7}
O Selekhmeteva	6^{5}	3
(Italy) S Errani	7^{7}	6
(Serbia) O Danilović	6	6
2	V Gracheva	4	2

Second round
5	(Netherlands) A Rus	5	2
(Spain) C Bucșa	7	6
(France) J Ponchet	6^{6}	6	6
Q	E Andreeva	7^{8}	2	3
Q	(France) A Robbe	6^{7}	1
Q	(Italy) C Rosatello	7^{9}	6
(Italy) S Errani	2	6	6
(Serbia) O Danilović	6	2	4

Quarterfinals
(Spain) C Bucșa	w/o
(France) J Ponchet
Q	(Italy) C Rosatello	2	3
(Italy) S Errani	6	6

Semifinals
(Spain) C Bucșa	3	2
(Italy) S Errani	6	6

== Qualifying ==
=== Seeds ===
1. Erika Andreeva (qualified)
2. Natalia Vikhlyantseva (qualifying competition, retired)
3. (Italy) Camilla Rosatello (qualified)
4. (France) Alice Robbe (qualified)

=== Qualifiers ===
1. Erika Andreeva
2. (Germany) Lena Papadakis
3. (Italy) Camilla Rosatello
4. (France) Alice Robbe

=== Draw ===
==== First qualifier ====
Qualifying competition
1	Erika Andreeva	7	7^{7}
WC	(France) Caroline Roméo	5	6^{4}

==== Second qualifier ====
Qualifying competition
2	Natalia Vikhlyantseva	0	0^{r}
	(Germany) Lena Papadakis	6	4

==== Third qualifier ====
Qualifying competition
3	(Italy) Camilla Rosatello	6	6
	(France) Émeline Dartron	3	2

==== Fourth qualifier ====
Qualifying competition
4/WC	(France) Alice Robbe	6	6
	(Slovenia) Nika Radišić	4	1
