= 2023 Grand Est Open 88 – Singles =

Singles
- 2023 Grand Est Open 88

Final
- Champion: (Netherlands) Arantxa Rus
- Runner-up: Anastasia Pavlyuchenkova
- Score: 6–3, 6–3

Events
Singles	Doubles
← 2022 ·	Grand Est Open 88	· 2024 →

Sara Errani was the defending champion, but lost in the quarterfinals to Anastasia Pavlyuchenkova.

Arantxa Rus won the title, defeating Pavlyuchenkova in the final, 6–3, 6–3.

== Seeds ==
1. (Germany) Tatjana Maria (first round)
2. (Spain) Cristina Bucșa (quarterfinals)
3. (Italy) Sara Errani (quarterfinals)
4. (Netherlands) Arantxa Rus (champion)
5. (Germany) Anna-Lena Friedsam (quarterfinals)
6. (France) Diane Parry (second round)
7. (France) Clara Burel (second round)
8. Anastasia Pavlyuchenkova (final)

== Draw ==
=== Key ===
- Q = Qualifier
- WC = Wild card
- LL = Lucky loser
- Alt = Alternate
- SE = Special exempt
- PR = Protected ranking
- ITF = ITF entry
- JE = Junior exempt
- w/o = Walkover
- r = Retired
- d = Defaulted
- SR = Special ranking

=== Finals ===
Semifinals
Q	(Czech Republic) Tereza Martincová	2	0^{r}
8	Anastasia Pavlyuchenkova	6	1
4	(Netherlands) Arantxa Rus	6	7
WC	(France) Fiona Ferro	2	5

Final
8	Anastasia Pavlyuchenkova	3	3
4	(Netherlands) Arantxa Rus	6	6

=== Top half ===
First round
1	(Germany) T Maria	3	6^{2}
Q	(Czech Republic) T Martincová	6	7^{7}
WC	(France) M Rouvroy	1	4
(United States) H Baptiste	6	6
(Serbia) A Krunić	6	3	6
(Greece) V Grammatikopoulou	2	6	4
(Greece) D Papamichail	3	4
5	(Germany) A-L Friedsam	6	6
3	(Italy) S Errani	7^{7}	7
(France) E Jacquemot	6^{5}	5
(Canada) C Zhao	3	2
Q	A Tikhonova	6	6
Q	(Slovenia) D Jakupović	1^{r}
LL	(Spain) R Vicens Mas	2
WC	(France) A Hesse	3	6	6^{7}
8	A Pavlyuchenkova	6	1	7^{9}

Second round
Q	(Czech Republic) T Martincová	4	6	6
(United States) H Baptiste	6	3	2
(Serbia) A Krunić	0	6^{5}
5	(Germany) A-L Friedsam	6	7^{7}
3	(Italy) S Errani	6	7
Q	A Tikhonova	2	5
LL	(Spain) R Vicens Mas	4	6^{4}
8	A Pavlyuchenkova	6	7^{7}

Quarterfinals
Q	(Czech Republic) T Martincová	6	6
5	(Germany) A-L Friedsam	1	1
3	(Italy) S Errani	1	0
8	A Pavlyuchenkova	6	6

Semifinals
Q	(Czech Republic) T Martincová	2	0^{r}
8	A Pavlyuchenkova	6	1

=== Bottom half ===
First round
7	(France) C Burel	7	6
(Czech Republic) B Palicová	5	1
M Timofeeva	2	6	4
(Germany) E Lys	6	2	6
(Romania) I Bara	1	0
E Andreeva	6	6
Q	(United States) E Kalieva	1	3
4	(Netherlands) A Rus	6	6
6	(France) D Parry	6	7^{7}
(France) K Mladenovic	3	6^{2}
(Slovakia) R Šramková	5	6	2
WC	(France) F Ferro	7	0	6
(Brazil) L Pigossi	5	0
WC	(France) T Andrianjafitrimo	7	6
(Germany) T Korpatsch	6	4	3
2	(Spain) C Bucșa	1	6	6

Second round
7	(France) C Burel	6	1	3
(Germany) E Lys	2	6	6
E Andreeva	6	2	4
4	(Netherlands) A Rus	3	6	6
6	(France) D Parry	6	2	5
WC	(France) F Ferro	3	6	7
WC	(France) T Andrianjafitrimo	0	0
2	(Spain) C Bucșa	6	6

Quarterfinals
(Germany) E Lys	4	4
4	(Netherlands) A Rus	6	6
WC	(France) F Ferro	6	6
2	(Spain) C Bucșa	2	2

Semifinals
4	(Netherlands) A Rus	6	7
WC	(France) F Ferro	2	5

== Qualifying ==
=== Seeds ===
1. (Czech Republic) Tereza Martincová (qualified)
2. (Argentina) María Lourdes Carlé (qualifying competition)
3. (United States) Elvina Kalieva (qualified)
4. (Spain) Rosa Vicens Mas (qualifying competition, lucky loser)
5. (Czech Republic) Barbora Palicová (moved to main draw)
6. Tatiana Prozorova (qualifying competition)
7. (Slovenia) Dalila Jakupović (qualified)
8. Anastasia Tikhonova (qualified)

=== Qualifiers ===
1. (Czech Republic) Tereza Martincová
2. (Slovenia) Dalila Jakupović
3. (United States) Elvina Kalieva
4. Anastasia Tikhonova

=== Lucky loser ===
1. (Spain) Rosa Vicens Mas

=== Draw ===
==== First qualifier ====
First round			Qualifying competition
			1	(Czech Republic) Tereza Martincová	6	4	7
				Amina Anshba	0	6	5
	Amina Anshba	w/o		Amina Anshba	0	6	5
5	(Czech Republic) Barbora Palicová

==== Second qualifier ====
First round				Qualifying competition
				2	(Argentina) María Lourdes Carlé	4	4
				7	(Slovenia) Dalila Jakupović	6	6
	Sofya Lansere	4	3	7	(Slovenia) Dalila Jakupović	6	6
7	(Slovenia) Dalila Jakupović	6	6

==== Third qualifier ====
First round				Qualifying competition
				3	(United States) Elvina Kalieva	6	4	6
				6	Tatiana Prozorova	4	6	2
	(Ukraine) Kateryna Volodko	2	5	6	Tatiana Prozorova	4	6	2
6	Tatiana Prozorova	6	7

==== Fourth qualifier ====
First round					Qualifying competition
					4	(Spain) Rosa Vicens Mas	6	3	4
					8	Anastasia Tikhonova	4	6	6
	(France) Sarah Iliev	6	1	0	8	Anastasia Tikhonova	4	6	6
8	Anastasia Tikhonova	3	6	6
