= 2021 Grand Est Open 88 – Doubles =

Doubles
- 2021 Grand Est Open 88

Final
- Champions: (Kazakhstan) Anna Danilina (Norway) Ulrikke Eikeri
- Runners-up: (Hungary) Dalma Gálfi (Belgium) Kimberley Zimmermann
- Score: 6–0, 1–6, [10–4]

Events
Singles	Doubles
← 2019 ·	Grand Est Open 88	· 2022 →

Georgina García Pérez and Oksana Kalashnikova were the defending champions but chose not to participate. Anna Danilina and Ulrikke Eikeri won the title, defeating Dalma Gálfi and Kimberley Zimmermann in the final, 6–0, 1–6, [10–4].

== Seeds ==
1. (Kazakhstan) Anna Danilina / (Norway) Ulrikke Eikeri (champions)
2. (Hungary) Dalma Gálfi / (Belgium) Kimberley Zimmermann (final)
3. (France) Amandine Hesse / (Chile) Daniela Seguel (semifinals)
4. (France) Estelle Cascino / (China) Yuan Yue (quarterfinals)

== Draw ==
=== Key ===
- Q = Qualifier
- WC = Wild card
- LL = Lucky loser
- Alt = Alternate
- ITF = ITF entry
- PR = Protected ranking
- SR = Special ranking
- SE = Special exempt
- JE = Junior exempt
- JR = Junior Accelerator Programme entrant
- CO = College Accelerator Programme entrant
- NG = Next Gen Accelerator Program entrant
- w/o = Walkover
- r = Retired
- d = Defaulted

=== Draw ===
First round
(Germany) A Klasen (France) M Partaud	6	7
(Netherlands) A Hartono (Japan) YL Miyazaki	3	5
(Belgium) M Kempen (Switzerland) J Züger
(Romania) I Fetecău (Bulgaria) E Kostova	w/o
(France) E Girard (Ukraine) M Kostiuk
(France) A Albié (France) L Jeanjean	w/o

Quarterfinals
1	(Kazakhstan) A Danilina (Norway) U Eikeri	6	6
(Germany) A Klasen (France) M Partaud	0	0
3	(France) A Hesse (Chile) D Seguel	w/o
(Romania) I Fetecău (Bulgaria) E Kostova
(France) A Albié (France) L Jeanjean	7	4	[10]
4	(France) E Cascino (China) Y Yuan	5	6	[8]
(Russia) O Selekhmeteva (Ukraine) V Strakhova	3	1
2	(Hungary) D Gálfi (Belgium) K Zimmermann	6	6

Semifinals
1	(Kazakhstan) A Danilina (Norway) U Eikeri	6	6
3	(France) A Hesse (Chile) D Seguel	1	3
(France) A Albié (France) L Jeanjean	4	5
2	(Hungary) D Gálfi (Belgium) K Zimmermann	6	7

Final
1	(Kazakhstan) A Danilina (Norway) U Eikeri	6	1	[10]
2	(Hungary) D Gálfi (Belgium) K Zimmermann	0	6	[4]
