= 2024 Grand Est Open 88 – Doubles =

Doubles
- 2024 Grand Est Open 88

Final
- Champions: (Georgia (country)) Oksana Kalashnikova; Iryna Shymanovich
- Runners-up: (Chinese Taipei) Wu Fang-hsien (China) Zhang Shuai
- Score: 5–7, 6–3, [10–7]

Events
Singles	Doubles
← 2023 ·	Grand Est Open 88	· 2025 →

Oksana Kalashnikova and Iryna Shymanovich won the title, defeating Wu Fang-hsien and Zhang Shuai in the final, 5–7, 6–3, [10–7].

Cristina Bucșa and Alena Fomina-Klotz were the reigning champions but chose not to participate.

== Seeds ==
1. (Chinese Taipei) Wu Fang-hsien / (China) Zhang Shuai (final)
2. (Georgia (country)) Oksana Kalashnikova / Iryna Shymanovich (champions)

== Draw ==
=== Key ===
- Q = Qualifier
- WC = Wild card
- LL = Lucky loser
- Alt = Alternate
- SE = Special exempt
- PR = Protected ranking
- ITF = ITF entry
- JE = Junior exempt
- w/o = Walkover
- r = Retired
- d = Defaulted
- SR = Special ranking

Quarterfinals
1	(Chinese Taipei) F-h Wu (China) S Zhang	4	6	[11]
(United Kingdom) S Murray Sharan (Netherlands) B Schoofs	6	2	[9]
(Switzerland) C Perrin (China) Q Tang	4	6	[5]
(Italy) C Rosatello (Belgium) K Zimmermann	6	4	[10]
(France) C Monnet (France) M Rouvroy	7	6
(Spain) Y Cavallé Reimers (Colombia) Y Lizarazo	5	1
(France) E Cascino (France) E Jacquemot	1	3
2	(Georgia (country)) O Kalashnikova; I Shymanovich	6	6

Semifinals
1	(Chinese Taipei) F-h Wu (China) S Zhang	6	7^{7}
(Italy) C Rosatello (Belgium) K Zimmermann	3	6^{3}
(France) C Monnet (France) M Rouvroy	2	3
2	(Georgia (country)) O Kalashnikova; I Shymanovich	6	6

Final
1	(Chinese Taipei) F-h Wu (China) S Zhang	7	3	[7]
2	(Georgia (country)) O Kalashnikova; I Shymanovich	5	6	[10]
