= 2026 Grand Est Open 88 – Singles =

Singles
- 2026 Grand Est Open 88

Final
- Champion: (Egypt) Mayar Sherif
- Runner-up: (Belgium) Jeline Vandromme
- Score: 3–6, 7–6^{(7–0)}, 7–5

Events
Singles	Doubles
- Grand Est Open 88

Mayar Sherif won the title, defeating Jeline Vandromme 3–6, 7–6^{(7–0)}, 7–5 in the final.

Francesca Jones was the defending champion, but lost in the second round to Léolia Jeanjean.

== Seeds ==
1. (Croatia) Petra Marčinko (first round)
2. (France) Elsa Jacquemot (first round)
3. (Spain) Oksana Selekhmeteva (second round)
4. (United Kingdom) Francesca Jones (second round)
5. (Egypt) Mayar Sherif (champion)
6. Anna Blinkova (quarterfinals)
7. (Austria) Julia Grabher (first round)
8. (Czech Republic) Dominika Šalková (first round)

== Draw ==
Key

- Q = Qualifier
- WC = Wild card
- LL = Lucky loser
- Alt = Alternate
- ITF = ITF entry
- PR = Protected ranking
- SR = Special ranking
- SE = Special exempt
- JE = Junior exempt
- JR = Junior Accelerator Programme entrant
- CO = College Accelerator Programme entrant
- NG = Next Gen Accelerator Program entrant
- w/o = Walkover
- r = Retired
- d = Defaulted

=== Finals ===
Semifinals
5	(Egypt) Mayar Sherif	7	7^{7}
(France) Léolia Jeanjean	5	6^{3}
(Belgium) Jeline Vandromme	6	6
(Italy) Aurora Zantedeschi	3	4

Final
5	(Egypt) Mayar Sherif	3	7^{7}	7
(Belgium) Jeline Vandromme	6	6^{0}	5

=== Top half ===
First round
1	(Croatia) P Marčinko	7^{7}	0	2
WC	(France) C Burel	6^{3}	6	6
(Armenia) E Avanesyan	2	4
Q	(Spain) A Herrero Liñana	6	6
WC	(France) A Hesse	6	6
(Czech Republic) B Palicová	4	2
(Morocco) Y Kabbaj	4	2
5	(Egypt) M Sherif	6	6
4	(United Kingdom) F Jones	6	7
(France) A Ramé	2	5
Q	(France) A Monnot	4	3
(France) L Jeanjean	6	6
(France) A Tubello	2	7	6
(China) Y Ren	6	5	4
(Germany) C Werner	6	7
8	(Czech Republic) D Šalková	1	5

Second round
WC	(France) C Burel	3	6	3
Q	(Spain) A Herrero Liñana	6	4	6
WC	(France) A Hesse	3	5
5	(Egypt) M Sherif	6	7
4	(United Kingdom) F Jones	6	4	5
(France) L Jeanjean	1	6	7
(France) A Tubello	6	6
(Germany) C Werner	3	3

Quarterfinals
Q	(Spain) A Herrero Liñana	2	3
5	(Egypt) M Sherif	6	6
(France) L Jeanjean	3	6	6
(France) A Tubello	6	3	4

Semifinals
5	(Egypt) M Sherif	7	7^{7}
(France) L Jeanjean	5	6^{3}

=== Bottom half ===
First round
7	(Austria) J Grabher	6^{5}	6	5
(Switzerland) R Masarova	7^{7}	4	7
(Malta) F Curmi	6	6
WC	(France) O Dodin	4	3
(Belgium) J Vandromme	6	6
Q	(France) D Martynov	3	3
Q	(Ukraine) Y Kotliar	4	4
3	(Spain) O Selekhmeteva	6	6
6	A Blinkova	7^{7}	7
E Andreeva	6^{4}	5
(Argentina) ML Carlé	6	6
(Brazil) L Pigossi	2	1
(Spain) Á Fita Boluda	1	6	6^{7}
(Italy) L Pigato	6	1	7^{9}
(Italy) A Zantedeschi	6	6
2/WC	(France) E Jacquemot	1	2

Second round
(Switzerland) R Masarova	4	4
(Malta) F Curmi	6	6
(Belgium) J Vandromme	6	6
3	(Spain) O Selekhmeteva	0	1
6	A Blinkova	6	7^{7}
(Argentina) ML Carlé	4	6^{5}
(Italy) L Pigato	2	5^{r}
(Italy) A Zantedeschi	6	5

Quarterfinals
(Malta) F Curmi	3	0
(Belgium) J Vandromme	6	6
6	A Blinkova	4	6^{5}
(Italy) A Zantedeschi	6	7^{7}

Semifinals
(Belgium) J Vandromme	6	6
(Italy) A Zantedeschi	3	4

== Qualifying ==
=== Seeds ===
1. (Uzbekistan) Polina Kudermetova (first round)
2. (France) Amandine Monnot (qualified)
3. (Spain) Alicia Herrero Liñana (qualified)
4. (Germany) Gina Dittmann (first round)
5. (France) Lucie Nguyen Tan (qualifying competition)
6. (Ukraine) Yelyzaveta Kotliar (qualified)
7. (France) Diana Martynov (qualified)
8. (Romania) Maria Sara Popa (qualifying competition)

=== Qualifiers ===
1. (Ukraine) Yelyzaveta Kotliar
2. (France) Amandine Monnot
3. (Spain) Alicia Herrero Liñana
4. (France) Diana Martynov

=== Qualifying draw ===
==== First qualifier ====
First round
1	(Uzbekistan) Polina Kudermetova	6^{2}	2
(France) Liv Boulard	7^{7}	6
(Germany) Tayisiya Morderger	6	3	0
6	(Ukraine) Yelyzaveta Kotliar	3	6	6

Qualifying competition
(France) Liv Boulard	4	3
6	(Ukraine) Yelyzaveta Kotliar	6	6

==== Second qualifier ====
First round
2	(France) Amandine Monnot	6	7^{7}
(Netherlands) Jasmijn Gimbrère	3	6^{5}
(France) Yara Bartashevich	1	6^{6}
8	(Romania) Maria Sara Popa	6	7^{8}

Qualifying competition
2	(France) Amandine Monnot	7	7^{7}
8	(Romania) Maria Sara Popa	5	6^{5}

==== Third qualifier ====
First round
3	(Spain) Alicia Herrero Liñana	5	6	6
(France) Dune Vaissaud	7	1	0
(Germany) Yana Morderger	0	2
5	(France) Lucie Nguyen Tan	6	6

Qualifying competition
3	(Spain) Alicia Herrero Liñana	6	6
5	(France) Lucie Nguyen Tan	1	1

==== Fourth qualifier ====
First round
4	(Germany) Gina Dittmann	4	4
(France) Astrid Lew Yan Foon	6	6
(Czech Republic) Michaela Bayerlová	4	1
7	(France) Diana Martynov	6	6

Qualifying competition
(France) Astrid Lew Yan Foon	3	6	5
7	(France) Diana Martynov	6	4	7
