= Arboretum de Contrexéville =

Arboretum in Grand Est, France

Coordinates: 48.185°N 5.896°E

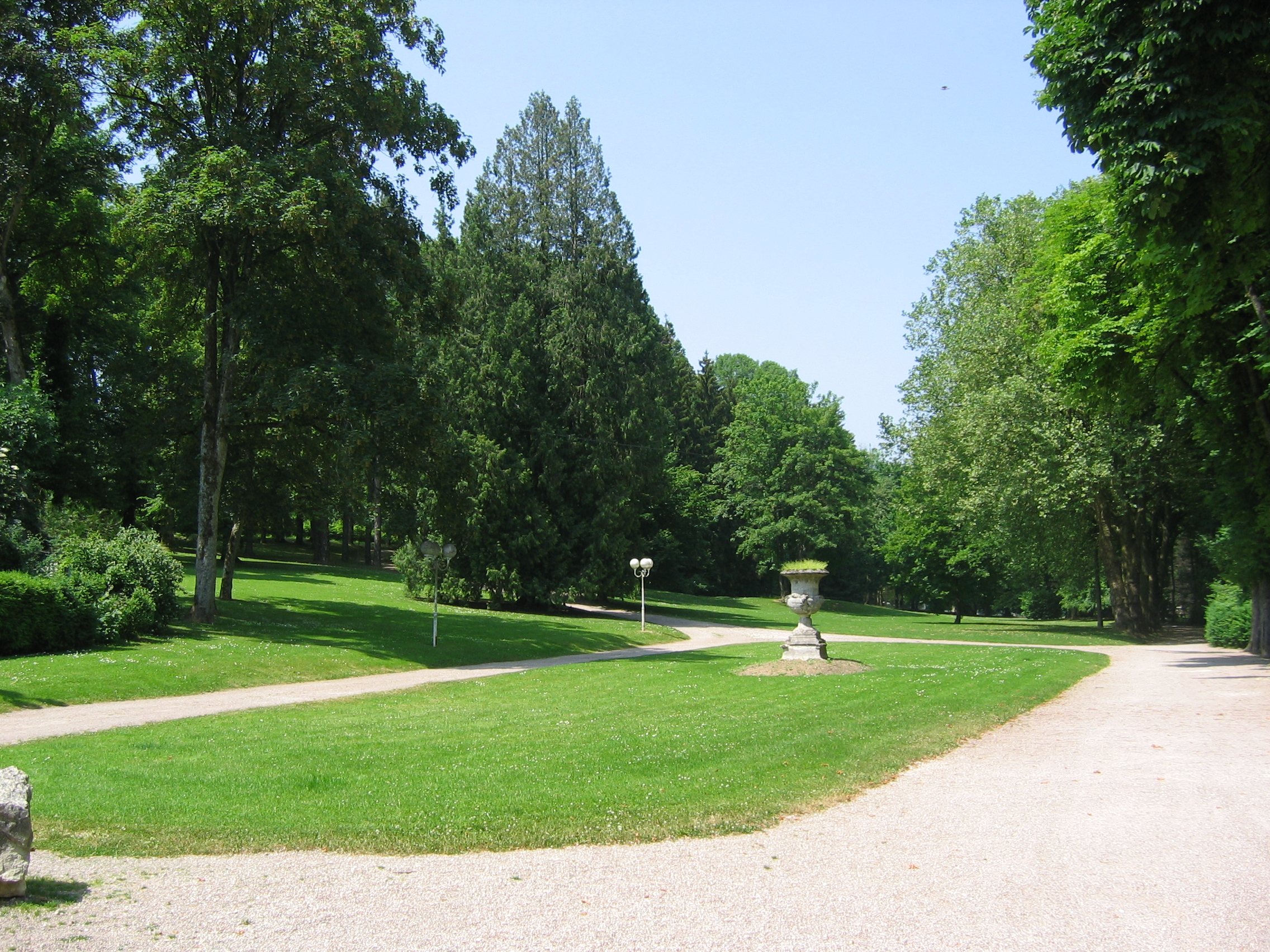
Arboretum de Contrexéville in the thermal park

The Arboretum de Contrexéville (0.7 hectares) is an arboretum located in the thermal park (constructed 1908) in the center of Contrexéville, Vosges, Grand Est, France. It contains walking paths and is open daily without charge.

== See also ==
- List of botanical gardens in France
