= 2026 Grand Est Open 88 – Doubles =

Doubles
- 2026 Grand Est Open 88

Final
- Champions: (France) Estelle Cascino (Argentina) Nicole Fossa Huergo
- Runners-up: (Spain) Yvonne Cavallé Reimers (Brazil) Laura Pigossi
- Score: 6–7^{(3–7)}, 6–2, [10–6]

Details
- Draw: 6
- Seeds: 4

Events
Singles	Doubles
- Grand Est Open 88

Quinn Gleason and Ingrid Martins were the defending champions, but did not participate this year.

Estelle Cascino and Nicole Fossa Huergo won the title, defeating Yvonne Cavallé Reimers and Laura Pigossi 6–7^{(3–7)}, 6–2, [10–6] in the final.

== Seeds ==
1. (Spain) Yvonne Cavallé Reimers / (Brazil) Laura Pigossi (final)
2. (France) Estelle Cascino / (Argentina) Nicole Fossa Huergo (champions)
3. (Spain) Alicia Herrero Liñana / (Australia) Alexandra Osborne (semifinals)
4. (Romania) Irina Bara / (United Kingdom) Madeleine Brooks (quarterfinals)

== Draw ==
Key

- Q = Qualifier
- WC = Wild card
- LL = Lucky loser
- Alt = Alternate
- ITF = ITF entry
- PR = Protected ranking
- SR = Special ranking
- SE = Special exempt
- JE = Junior exempt
- JR = Junior Accelerator Programme entrant
- CO = College Accelerator Programme entrant
- NG = Next Gen Accelerator Program entrant
- w/o = Walkover
- r = Retired
- d = Defaulted

=== Draw ===
Quarterfinals
(Czech Republic) M Bayerlová (China) S Feng	1	6	[7]
3	(Spain) A Herrero Liñana (Australia) A Osborne	6	2	[10]
4	(Romania) I Bara (United Kingdom) M Brooks	2	5
(Argentina) ML Carlé (Spain) O Selekhmeteva	6	7

Semifinals
1	(Spain) Y Cavallé Reimers (Brazil) L Pigossi	5	7	[10]
3	(Spain) A Herrero Liñana (Australia) A Osborne	7	5	[8]
(Argentina) ML Carlé (Spain) O Selekhmeteva	2	3
2	(France) E Cascino (Argentina) N Fossa Huergo	6	6

Final
1	(Spain) Y Cavallé Reimers (Brazil) L Pigossi	7^{7}	2	[6]
2	(France) E Cascino (Argentina) N Fossa Huergo	6^{3}	6	[10]
