= 2026 Grand Est Open 88 =

- Date: 6–12 July
- Edition: 19th
- Category: WTA 125
- Prize money: $115,000
- Surface: Clay
- Location: Contrexéville, France
- Venue: Tennis Club de Contrexéville

Champions

Singles
- (Egypt) Mayar Sherif

Doubles
- (France) Estelle Cascino / (Argentina) Nicole Fossa Huergo
- Grand Est Open 88

The 2026 Grand Est Open 88 was a professional women's tennis tournament played on outdoor clay courts. It was the nineteenth edition of the tournament, and part of the 2026 WTA 125 tournaments. It took place in Contrexéville, France between 6 and 12 July 2026.

== Singles main-draw entrants ==
=== Seeds ===
Country	Player	Rank^{1}	Seed
CRO	Petra Marčinko	47	1
FRA	Elsa Jacquemot	80	2
ESP	Oksana Selekhmeteva	91	3
GBR	Francesca Jones	106	4
EGY	Mayar Sherif	109	5
	Anna Blinkova	114	6
AUT	Julia Grabher	116	7
CZE	Dominika Šalková	126	8

- ^{1} Rankings are as of 29 June 2026.

=== Other entrants ===
The following players received wildcards into the singles main draw:

- (France) Clara Burel
- (France) Océane Dodin
- (France) Amandine Hesse
- (France) Elsa Jacquemot

The following players received entry from the qualifying draw:

- (Spain) Alicia Herrero Liñana
- (Ukraine) Yelyzaveta Kotliar
- (France) Diana Martynov
- (France) Amandine Monnot

=== Withdrawals ===
Before the tournament

- (France) Loïs Boisson → replaced by (France) Alice Tubello
- (North Macedonia) Lina Gjorcheska → replaced by (Armenia) Elina Avanesyan
- (Slovenia) Polona Hercog → replaced by (Malta) Francesca Curmi
- (Ukraine) Anhelina Kalinina → replaced by (Germany) Caroline Werner
- (Spain) Guiomar Maristany → replaced by Erika Andreeva
- (France) Carole Monnet → replaced by (Brazil) Laura Pigossi
- (France) Jessika Ponchet → replaced by (Italy) Aurora Zantedeschi
- (France) Tiantsoa Rakotomanga Rajaonah → replaced by (Morocco) Yasmine Kabbaj
- (Slovakia) Rebecca Šramková → replaced by (Czech Republic) Barbora Palicová
- (Switzerland) Jil Teichmann → replaced by (China) Ren Yufei

=== Retirement ===
- (Italy) Lisa Pigato

== Doubles main-draw entrants ==
=== Seeds ===
Country	Player	Country	Player	Rank^{1}	Seed
ESP	Yvonne Cavallé Reimers	BRA	Laura Pigossi	193	1
FRA	Estelle Cascino	ARG	Nicole Fossa Huergo	206	2

- ^{1} Rankings are as of 29 June 2026.

== Champions ==
=== Singles ===
- (Egypt) Mayar Sherif def. (Belgium) Jeline Vandromme 3–6, 7–6^{(7–0)}, 7–5

=== Doubles ===
- (France) Estelle Cascino / (Argentina) Nicole Fossa Huergo def. (Spain) Yvonne Cavallé Reimers / (Brazil) Laura Pigossi 6–7^{(3–7)}, 6–2, [10–6]
