= 2025 Grand Est Open 88 =

Tennis tournament

- Date: 7–13 July
- Edition: 18th
- Category: WTA 125
- Prize money: $115,000
- Surface: Clay
- Location: Contrexéville, France
- Venue: Tennis Club de Contrexéville

Champions

Singles
- (United Kingdom) Francesca Jones

Doubles
- (United States) Quinn Gleason / (Brazil) Ingrid Martins
- Grand Est Open 88

The 2025 Grand Est Open 88 was a professional women's tennis tournament played on outdoor clay courts. It was the eighteenth edition of the tournament, and part of the 2025 WTA 125 tournaments. It took place in Contrexéville, France between 7 and 13 July 2025.

== Singles main-draw entrants ==
=== Seeds ===
Country	Player	Rank^{1}	Seed
FRA	Varvara Gracheva	92	1
FRA	Léolia Jeanjean	96	2
SUI	Rebeka Masarova	100	3
FRA	Elsa Jacquemot	113	4
GBR	Francesca Jones	122	5
SUI	Simona Waltert	127	6
AND	Victoria Jiménez Kasintseva	136	7
	Oksana Selekhmeteva	144	8

- ^{1} Rankings are as of 30 June 2025.

=== Other entrants ===
The following players received wildcards into the singles main draw:

- (France) Julie Belgraver
- (France) Amandine Hesse
- (France) Séléna Janicijevic
- (France) Margaux Rouvroy

The following player received entry using a protected ranking:

- (Spain) Aliona Bolsova

The following players received entry from the qualifying draw:

- (Spain) Ángela Fita Boluda
- Ekaterina Kazionova
- (France) Mathilde Lollia
- (Spain) Kaitlin Quevedo

=== Withdrawals ===
Before the tournament

- (Czech Republic) Sára Bejlek → replaced by (Netherlands) Anouk Koevermans
- (Spain) Cristina Bucșa → replaced by (Brazil) Laura Pigossi
- (Romania) Mihaela Buzărnescu → replaced by Alina Charaeva
- (Poland) Maja Chwalińska → replaced by (Croatia) Petra Marčinko
- (Slovenia) Veronika Erjavec → replaced by (France) Carole Monnet
- (China) Gao Xinyu → replaced by (France) Tessah Andrianjafitrimo
- (Chinese Taipei) Joanna Garland → replaced by (Argentina) Julia Riera
- (Montenegro) Danka Kovinić → replaced by (Switzerland) Susan Bandecchi
- Elena Pridankina → replaced by (France) Tiantsoa Rakotomanga Rajaonah
- (Thailand) Lanlana Tararudee → replaced by (Italy) Giorgia Pedone
- (Romania) Anca Todoni → replaced by (Romania) Miriam Bulgaru

== Doubles main-draw entrants ==
=== Seeds ===
Country	Player	Country	Player	Rank^{1}	Seed
USA	Quinn Gleason	BRA	Ingrid Martins	150	1
GBR	Emily Appleton	NED	Isabelle Haverlag	172	2

- ^{1} Rankings are as of 30 June 2025.

== Champions ==
=== Singles ===
- (United Kingdom) Francesca Jones def. (France) Elsa Jacquemot 6–4, 7–6^{(7–2)}

=== Doubles ===
- (United States) Quinn Gleason / (Brazil) Ingrid Martins def. (United Kingdom) Emily Appleton / (Netherlands) Isabelle Haverlag 6–1, 7–6^{(7–4)}
