= Contrexéville =

- Commune
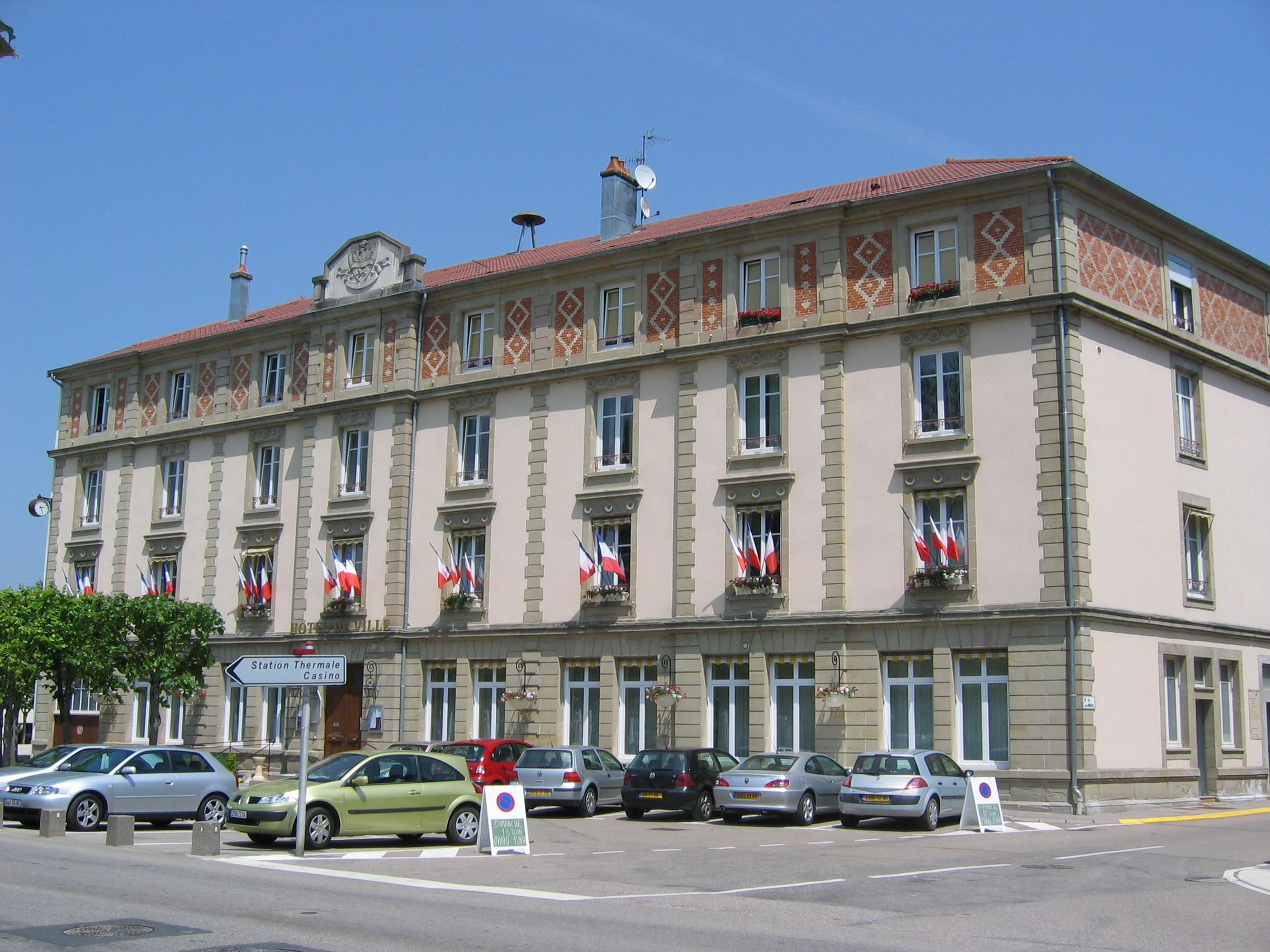
- The town hall in Contrexéville

- Coat of arms
- Location of Contrexéville
- Location within France Location within Grand Est
- Coordinates: 48°11′06″N 5°53′46″E
- Country: France
- Region: Grand Est
- Department: Vosges
- Arrondissement: Neufchâteau
- Canton: Vittel
- Intercommunality: CC Terre d'eau

Government
  - Mayor (2020–2026): Luc Gerecke
- Area^{1}: 14.96 km^{2} (5.78 sq mi)
- Elevation: 344 m (1,129 ft)
- Highest elevation: 442 m (1,450 ft)
- Lowest elevation: 324 m (1,063 ft)
- Population (2023): 2,923
  - Density: 195.4/km^{2} (506.1/sq mi)
- Time zone: UTC+01:00 (CET)
  - Summer (DST): UTC+02:00 (CEST)
- INSEE/Postal code: 88114 /88140
- ^{1} French Land Register data, which excludes lakes, ponds, glaciers > 1 km^{2} (0.386 sq mi or 247 acres) and river estuaries.

Contrexéville (French pronunciation: [kɔ̃tʁɛksevil]) is a commune of north-eastern France, in the Vosges département.

The mineral springs of Contrexéville have been known locally for many years, but became generally known only towards the end of the 18th century. The particular reputation of Contrexéville as a mineral spa and health resort dates from 1864, when development began by a company, the Société des Eaux de Contrexéville. Mineral water is bottled here by Nestlé Waters France, under the Contrex brand.

== Population ==
Historical population
Year	Pop.	±% p.a.
1968	3,236	—
1975	4,076	+3.35%
1982	4,090	+0.05%
1990	3,945	−0.45%
1999	3,708	−0.69%
2007	3,526	−0.63%
2012	3,317	−1.21%
2017	3,202	−0.70%
2023	2,923	−1.51%
Source: INSEE

Inhabitants are called Contrexévillois in French.

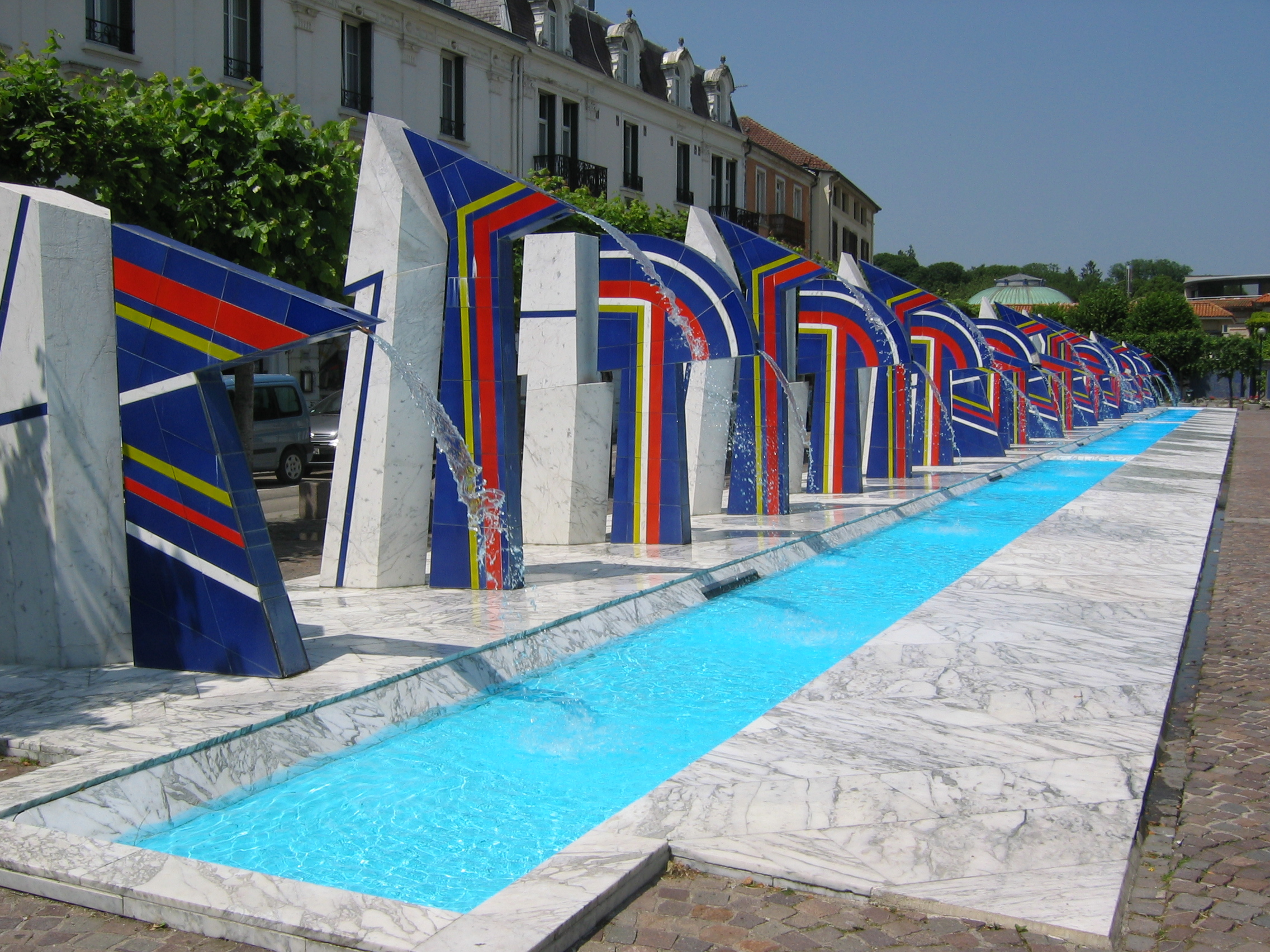
Place des fontaines in Contrexéville

== Sights ==
- Arboretum de Contrexéville

== Sport ==
- Grand Est Open 88 – WTA clay court tennis tournament

== Twin Towns ==
Contrexéville is twinned with:

- Bad Rappenau, Germany
- Llandrindod Wells, Wales, United Kingdom
- Luso, Portugal
- Mealhada, Portugal

== See also ==
- Communes of the Vosges department
- Lion and Sun#Other (non-Iranian) variants
