= Monaco at the 1976 Summer Olympics =

- IOC code: MON
- NOC: Comité Olympique Monégasque

in Montreal, Quebec, Canada
- Competitors: 6
- Flag bearer: Francis Boisson
- Medals: Gold 0 Silver 0 Bronze 0 Total 0

Summer Olympics appearances (overview)
- 1920; 1924; 1928; 1932; 1936; 1948; 1952; 1956; 1960; 1964; 1968; 1972; 1976; 1980; 1984; 1988; 1992; 1996; 2000; 2004; 2008; 2012; 2016; 2020; 2024

Monaco competed at the 1976 Summer Olympics in Montreal, Quebec, Canada. The country didn't win any medals.

In sailing, a team consisting of Gérard Battaglia, Jean-Pierre Borro and Claude Rossi participated in the Soling class. They ended in 23rd place.

In shooting, two men participated in the 50 metre rifle prone: Joe Barral (60th) and Pierre Boisson (64th). In the Trap competition Marcel Rué ended in 42nd position and Paul Cerutti was disqualified.

In swimming Patrick Novaretti participated in the 200 and 400 metres freestyle and the 400 metres individual medley.
