= Monaco at the 1960 Summer Olympics =

- IOC code: MON
- NOC: Comité Olympique Monégasque

in Rome
- Competitors: 11 in 3 sports
- Medals: Gold 0 Silver 0 Bronze 0 Total 0

Summer Olympics appearances (overview)
- 1920; 1924; 1928; 1932; 1936; 1948; 1952; 1956; 1960; 1964; 1968; 1972; 1976; 1980; 1984; 1988; 1992; 1996; 2000; 2004; 2008; 2012; 2016; 2020; 2024

Monaco competed at the 1960 Summer Olympics in Rome, Italy. The nation returned to the Olympic Games after missing the 1956 Summer Olympics. Eleven competitors, all men, took part in six events in three sports.

== Fencing ==
Two fencers represented Monaco in 1960.

Men's foil

- Gilbert Orengo
- Henri Bini

Men's épée

- Gilbert Orengo
- Henri Bini

== Shooting ==
Six shooters represented Monaco in 1960.

50 m rifle, three positions

- Gilbert Scorsoglio
- Francis Boisson

50 m rifle, prone

- Pierre Marsan
- Michel Ravarino

Trap

- Francis Bonafede
- Marcel Rué
