= Monaco at the 1924 Summer Olympics =

- IOC code: MON
- NOC: Comité Olympique Monégasque

in Paris
- Competitors: 7 men in 4 sports
- Flag bearer: Gaston Médecin
- Medals: Gold 0 Silver 0 Bronze 0 Total 0

Summer Olympics appearances (overview)
- 1920; 1924; 1928; 1932; 1936; 1948; 1952; 1956; 1960; 1964; 1968; 1972; 1976; 1980; 1984; 1988; 1992; 1996; 2000; 2004; 2008; 2012; 2016; 2020; 2024

Monaco competed at the 1924 Summer Olympics held in Paris, France.

Julien Médecin won a bronze medal for architecture at the art competitions. However, the medals for art competition are not included in the official tally. Seven competitors, all men, took part in six events in four sports.

== Athletics ==
A single athlete represented Monaco in 1924. It was the nation's second appearance in the sport as well as the Games.

Ranks given are within the heat.

Athlete	Event	Heats		Quarterfinals		Semifinals		Final	
Athlete	Event	Result	Rank	Result	Rank	Result	Rank	Result	Rank
Gaston Médecin	Long jump	N/A				6.51	8	did not advance	
Gaston Médecin	Pentathlon	N/A						Elim-3	
Gaston Médecin	Decathlon	N/A						5347.540	20

== Sailing ==
A single sailor represented Monaco in 1924. It was the nation's debut in the sport.

Sailor	Event	Qualifying				Final			
Sailor	Event	Race 1	Race 2	Race 3	Total	Race 1	Race 2	Total	Rank
Émile Barral	Olympic monotype	6	8 (DNF)	N/A		did not advance			

== Shooting ==
Four sport shooters represented Monaco in 1924. It was the nation's debut in the sport.

Shooter	Event	Final	
Shooter	Event	Score	Rank
Roger Abel	50 m rifle, prone	375	45
Victor Bonafède	50 m rifle, prone	383	31
Joseph Chiaubaut	50 m rifle, prone	361	59
Herman Schultz	50 m rifle, prone	381	36
