= Monaco at the 1936 Summer Olympics =

- IOC code: MON
- NOC: Comité Olympique Monégasque

in Berlin
- Competitors: 8 in 2 sports
- Medals: Gold 0 Silver 0 Bronze 0 Total 0

Summer Olympics appearances (overview)
- 1920; 1924; 1928; 1932; 1936; 1948; 1952; 1956; 1960; 1964; 1968; 1972; 1976; 1980; 1984; 1988; 1992; 1996; 2000; 2004; 2008; 2012; 2016; 2020; 2024

Monaco competed at the 1936 Summer Olympics in Berlin, Germany. The nation returned to the Olympic Games after missing the 1932 Summer Olympics. Eight competitors, all men, took part in five events in two sports.

== Shooting ==
Six shooters represented Monaco in 1936.

25 m rapid fire pistol

- Roger Abel
- Michel Ravarino
- Herman Schultz

50 m pistol

- Herman Schultz
- Louis Briano
- Victor Bonafède

50 m rifle, prone

- Michel Ravarino
- Roger Abel
- Pierre Marsan
