= Monaco at the 1948 Summer Olympics =

- IOC code: MON
- NOC: Comité Olympique Monégasque

in London
- Competitors: 4 in 1 sport
- Medals: Gold 0 Silver 0 Bronze 0 Total 0

Summer Olympics appearances (overview)
- 1920; 1924; 1928; 1932; 1936; 1948; 1952; 1956; 1960; 1964; 1968; 1972; 1976; 1980; 1984; 1988; 1992; 1996; 2000; 2004; 2008; 2012; 2016; 2020; 2024

Monaco competed at the 1948 Summer Olympics in London, England. Four competitors, all men, took part in two events in one sports.

== Shooting ==
Four shooters represented Monaco in 1948.

50 metre pistol

- Herman Schultz

50 metre rifle

- Michel Ravarino
- Pierre Marsan
- Roger Abel
