= Monaco at the 1972 Summer Olympics =

- IOC code: MON
- NOC: Comité Olympique Monégasque

in Munich
- Competitors: 5 in 2 sports
- Flag bearer: Jean-Charles Seneca
- Medals: Gold 0 Silver 0 Bronze 0 Total 0

Summer Olympics appearances (overview)
- 1920; 1924; 1928; 1932; 1936; 1948; 1952; 1956; 1960; 1964; 1968; 1972; 1976; 1980; 1984; 1988; 1992; 1996; 2000; 2004; 2008; 2012; 2016; 2020; 2024

Monaco competed at the 1972 Summer Olympics in Munich, West Germany. Five competitors, all men, took part in four events in two sports.

== Fencing ==
One fencer represented Monaco in 1972

Men's épée

- Jean-Charles Seneca - Eliminating rounds (2V-5L), did not advance

== Shooting ==
Four shooters represented Monaco in 1972.

50 m rifle, three positions

- Francis Boisson - 1004, 67th place

50 m rifle, prone

- Joe Barral - 593 pts, 31st place
- Pierre Boisson - 585 pts, 73rd place

Trap

- Paul Cerutti - 171pts, 45th place (disqualified)
