= Monaco at the 1952 Summer Olympics =

- IOC code: MON
- NOC: Comité Olympique Monégasque

in Helsinki
- Competitors: 8 in 2 sports
- Medals: Gold 0 Silver 0 Bronze 0 Total 0

Summer Olympics appearances (overview)
- 1920; 1924; 1928; 1932; 1936; 1948; 1952; 1956; 1960; 1964; 1968; 1972; 1976; 1980; 1984; 1988; 1992; 1996; 2000; 2004; 2008; 2012; 2016; 2020; 2024

Monaco competed at the 1952 Summer Olympics in Helsinki, Finland. Eight competitors, all men, took part in six events in two sports.

== Sailing ==
- Michel Auréglia
- Victor de Sigaldi

== Shooting ==
Six shooters represented Monaco in 1952.

25 m pistol

- Herman Schultz
- Charles Bergonzi

50 m pistol

- Herman Schultz

50 m rifle, three positions

- Roger Abel

50 m rifle, prone

- Pierre Marsan
- Roger Abel

Trap

- Georges Robini
- Marcel Rué
