= Monaco at the Mediterranean Games =

- IOC code: MON
- NOC: Monégasque Olympic Committee
- Medals Ranked 27th: Gold 1 Silver 4 Bronze 1 Total 6

Mediterranean Games appearances (overview)
- 1955; 1959; 1963; 1967–1971; 1975; 1979; 1983; 1987; 1991; 1993; 1997; 2001; 2005; 2009; 2013; 2018; 2022; 2026

Monaco first appeared in the quadrennial Mediterranean Games event in 1955; 71 years ago in Barcelona. After missing two editions in 1967 and 1971, the country has consistently appeared at every event since 1975. As of 2026, Monegasque athletes have won a total of six medals.

== Overview ==
Monaco's first medal came in 1963 in Naples, a bronze won by sailors Gérard Battaglia and Jean-Pierre Crovetto in the Snipe category. Along with Jules Soccal, they had competed three years earlier in the Dragon event as part of the 1960 Rome Olympics which also took place in the Gulf of Naples, where they finished 23rd.

This was the first major sporting medal won by any Monegasque competitor since architect Julien Médécin had been awarded a bronze medal in art competition at the 1924 Olympics in Paris.

Monaco's second medal came 46 years later, in the 2009 Mediterranean Games at Pescara, with judoka Yann Siccardi winning silver in the 60 kg event. In 2018 in Tarragona Lucas Catarina won silver in the men's tennis tournament, and the Chinese-born table tennis player Xiaoxin Yang added another silver in the women's singles tournament.

At the 2022 Mediterranean Games Xiaoxin Yang won a gold medal in women's singles, making it the first gold for Monaco in any international sporting event in history.

=== By event ===
Games	Athletes	Gold	Silver	Bronze	Total	Rank
1951 Alexandria	Did not participate					
1955 Barcelona	14	0	0	0	0	—
1959 Beirut	Did not participate					
1963 Naples	3	0	0	1	1	11th
1967 Tunis	Did not participate					
1971 İzmir	Did not participate					
1975 Algiers	4	0	0	0	0	—
1979 Split	5	0	0	0	0	—
1983 Casablanca	8	0	0	0	0	—
1987 Latakia	5	0	0	0	0	—
1991 Athens	8	0	0	0	0	—
1993 Languedoc-Roussillon	14	0	0	0	0	—
1997 Bari	13	0	0	0	0	—
2001 Tunis	7	0	0	0	0	—
2005 Almería	16	0	0	0	0	—
2009 Pescara	15	0	1	0	1	20th
2013 Mersin		0	0	0	0	—
2018 Tarragona	22	0	2	0	2	21st
2022 Oran	17	1	0	0	1	22nd
2026 Taranto	18	0	1	0	1	23rd
Total		1	4	1	6	27th

=== By sport ===
Sport	Gold	Silver	Bronze	Total
Table tennis	1	2	0	3
Judo	0	1	0	1
Tennis	0	1	0	1
Sailing	0	0	1	1
Total	1	4	1	6

== See also ==
- Monaco at the Olympics
- Monaco at the Paralympics
