= Shooting at the 1976 Summer Olympics – Mixed trap =

Sports shooting at the Olympics

Trap at the Games of the XXI Olympiad
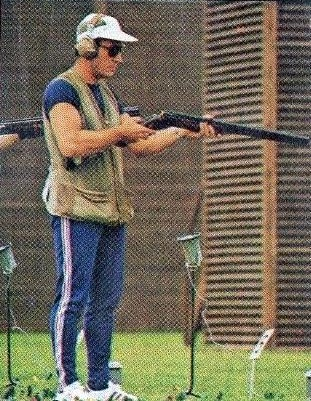
- Michel Carrega during the competition
- Venue: Olympic Shooting Range, L'Acadie
- Dates: 18–20 July 1976
- Competitors: 44 from 29 nations
- Winning score: 190

Medalists
1st place, gold medalist(s)		Donald Haldeman	United States
2nd place, silver medalist(s)		Armando Marques	Portugal
3rd place, bronze medalist(s)		Ubaldesco Baldi	Italy

The trap competition at the 1976 Summer Olympics was held on 18–20 July in Montreal, Canada. There were 44 competitors from 29 nations, with each nation limited to two shooters. The event was won by Donald Haldeman of the United States, the nation's first victory in the trap since back-to-back wins in 1912 and 1920. The three total victories tied the United States with Italy for most among nations at the time, though Italy would win the next two and the United States has not win again since (as of the 2016 Games). In this Games, Ubaldesco Baldi of Italy took bronze. Silver went to Armando Marques of Portugal, that nation's first medal in the trap.

== Background ==
This was the 12th appearance of the men's ISSF Olympic trap event. The event was held at every Summer Olympics from 1896 to 1924 (except 1904, when no shooting events were held) and from 1952 to 2016. As with most shooting events, it was nominally open to women from 1968 to 1980; the trap remained open to women through 1992. Very few women participated these years. The event returned to being men-only for 1996, though the new double trap had separate events for men and women that year. In 2000, a separate women's event was added and it has been contested at every Games since. There was also a men's team trap event held four times from 1908 to 1924.

Seven of the top 10 shooters from the 1972 Games returned: silver medalist Michel Carrega of France, bronze medalist Silvano Basagni of Italy, fourth-place finisher Burckhardt Hoppe of East Germany, fifth-place finisher Johnny Påhlsson of Sweden, seventh-place finisher John Primrose of Canada, eighth-place finisher Marcos José Olsen of Brazil, and tenth-place finisher Eladio Vallduvi of Spain. Primrose had also been in the top 10 in 1968. Adam Smelczyński of Poland made his sixth appearance in the event; he had taken silver in his first, in 1956. The three World Champions since the last Games were Aleksandr Androshkin of the Soviet Union (1973), Carrega (1974), and Primrose (1975).

Andorra, Guatemala, Iran, Papua New Guinea, and Singapore each made their debut in the event. Great Britain made its 12th appearance, the only nation to have competed at each edition of the event to that point.

== Competition format ==
The competition used the 200-target format introduced with the return of trap to the Olympics in 1952. Only a single round of shooting was done, with all shooters facing 200 targets. Shooting was done in 8 series of 25 targets. The first three series (75 shots) were on day 1, the next three (75 shots) on day 2, and the final two series (50 shots) on day 3.

== Records ==
Prior to this competition, the existing world and Olympic records were as follows.

World record	Angelo Scalzone (ITA)	199	Munich, West Germany	27–29 August 1972
Olympic record	Angelo Scalzone (ITA)	199	Munich, West Germany	27–29 August 1972

No new world or Olympic records were set during the competition.

== Schedule ==
Date	Time	Round
Sunday, 18 July 1976	9:30	Course 1
Monday, 19 July 1976	9:30	Course 2
Tuesday, 20 July 1976	9:30	Course 3

== Results ==
Cerutti was disqualified after it was discovered he had been taking amphetamines. The stimulants didn't help his performance - he finished 43rd out of a field of 44.

Rank	Shooter	Nation	Score	Notes
1st place, gold medalist(s)	Donald Haldeman	United States	190	
2nd place, silver medalist(s)	Armando Marques	Portugal	189	
3rd place, bronze medalist(s)	Ubaldesco Baldi	Italy	189	
4	Burckhardt Hoppe	East Germany	186	
5	Aleksandr Androshkin	Soviet Union	185	
6	Adam Smelczyński	Poland	183	
7	John Primrose	Canada	183	
8	Bernard Blondeau	France	182	
9	Jacques Colon	Belgium	182	
10	Johnny Påhlsson	Sweden	181	
11	Esteban Azcue	Spain	181	
11	Charvin Dixon	United States	181	
11	Marcos José Olsen	Brazil	181	
14	Aleksandr Alipov	Soviet Union	180	
15	Richard Flynn	Ireland	179	
16	Jitsuka Matsuoka	Japan	178	
16	Josef Meixner	Austria	178	
18	György Gruber	Hungary	177	
18	Toshiyasu Ishige	Japan	177	
18	Malcolm Jenkins	Great Britain	177	
21	Silvano Basagni	Italy	175	
21	Leo Franciosi	San Marino	175	
21	Randhir Singh	India	175	
21	Eladio Vallduvi	Spain	175	
25	Susan Nattrass	Canada	173	
25	Nikolaus Reinprecht	Austria	173	
25	Peter Wray	Australia	173	
28	Peter Boden	Great Britain	169	
29	Justo Fernández	Mexico	168	
29	Silvano Raganini	San Marino	168	
31	Michel Carrega	France	167	
32	Hugo Dufey	Chile	166	
33	Joan Tomas	Andorra	162	
34	Pavitr Kachasanee	Thailand	160	
35	Trevan Clough	Papua New Guinea	159	
35	Esteve Dolsa	Andorra	159	
37	Fernando Walls	Mexico	158	
38	Eduardo Echeverría	Guatemala	156	
39	Damrong Pachonyut	Thailand	153	
40	Frank Oh	Singapore	152	
41	Mohammad Alidjani-Momer	Iran	150	
42	Marcel Rué	Monaco	141	
43	Houshang Ghazvini	Iran	71	5 rounds
—	Paul Cerutti	Monaco	~~129~~	DPG
