= Monaco at the 1920 Summer Olympics =

- IOC code: MON
- NOC: Comité Olympique Monégasque

in Antwerp
- Flag bearer: Edmond Médécin
- Medals: Gold 0 Silver 0 Bronze 0 Total 0

Summer Olympics appearances (overview)
- 1920; 1924; 1928; 1932; 1936; 1948; 1952; 1956; 1960; 1964; 1968; 1972; 1976; 1980; 1984; 1988; 1992; 1996; 2000; 2004; 2008; 2012; 2016; 2020; 2024

Monaco competed in the Summer Olympic Games for the first time at the 1920 Summer Olympics held in Antwerp, Belgium.

== Competitors ==
- In the long jump, Edmond Médecin of Monaco achieved 21st place in the eliminatory round with a jump of 6.035 m (19′ 9 3/8″).
- Joseph Grovetto and Michel Porasso represented Monaco in the individual gymnastics competition.

== Athletics ==
Two athletes represented Monaco in the nation's debut in 1920.

Ranks given are within the heat.

Athlete	Event	Heats		Quarterfinals		Semifinals		Final	
Athlete	Event	Result	Rank	Result	Rank	Result	Rank	Result	Rank
Émile Barral	800 m	N/A			7	did not advance			
Edmond Médécin	100 m	11.8	5	did not advance					
Edmond Médécin	200 m		5	did not advance					
Edmond Médécin	Long jump	6.035	21	N/A				did not advance	
Edmond Médécin	Pentathlon	N/A						did not finish	

== Gymnastics ==
Two gymnasts represented Monaco in 1920. It was the nation's debut in the sport. Monaco's gymnasts took twelfth and twenty-second among the 25-man field.

=== Artistic gymnastics ===
Gymnast	Event	Final	
Gymnast	Event	Result	Rank
Joseph Crovetto	All-around	74.10	22
Michel Porasso	All-around	81.40	12
