= Monaco at the 1984 Summer Olympics =

- IOC code: MON
- NOC: Comité Olympique Monégasque

in Los Angeles
- Competitors: 8 in 5 sports
- Flag bearer: Jean-Luc Adorno
- Medals: Gold 0 Silver 0 Bronze 0 Total 0

Summer Olympics appearances (overview)
- 1920; 1924; 1928; 1932; 1936; 1948; 1952; 1956; 1960; 1964; 1968; 1972; 1976; 1980; 1984; 1988; 1992; 1996; 2000; 2004; 2008; 2012; 2016; 2020; 2024

Monaco competed at the 1984 Summer Olympics in Los Angeles, United States. The nation returned to the Summer Games after participating in the American-led boycott of the 1980 Summer Olympics. Eight competitors, all men, took part in seven events in five sports.

== Archery ==
- Gilles Cresto — 2389 points (→ 39th place)

== Fencing ==
One fencer represented Monaco in 1984.

Men's sabre

- Olivier Martini

== Swimming ==
Men's 100m Freestyle

- Jean-Luc Adomo

- Heat — 56.38 (→ did not advance, 56th place)
