= Monaco at the 1968 Summer Olympics =

- IOC code: MON
- NOC: Comité Olympique Monégasque

in Mexico City
- Competitors: 2 in 1 sport
- Medals: Gold 0 Silver 0 Bronze 0 Total 0

Summer Olympics appearances (overview)
- 1920; 1924; 1928; 1932; 1936; 1948; 1952; 1956; 1960; 1964; 1968; 1972; 1976; 1980; 1984; 1988; 1992; 1996; 2000; 2004; 2008; 2012; 2016; 2020; 2024

Monaco competed at the 1968 Summer Olympics in Mexico City, Mexico. Two competitors, both men, took part in one event in one sport.

== Results by athlete ==
=== Shooting ===
50 metre rifle, prone position

- Joe Barral — 577 points (→ 83rd place)
- Gilbert Scorsoglio — 573 points (→ 85th place)
