= Shooting at the 1948 Summer Olympics – Men's 50 metre rifle prone =

Men's 50 metre rifle, prone at the Games of the XIV Olympiad
- Venue: London, England
- Date: 3 August 1948
- Competitors: 71 from 26 nations

Medalists
1st place, gold medalist(s)		Art Cook	United States
2nd place, silver medalist(s)		Walter Tomsen	United States
3rd place, bronze medalist(s)		Jonas Jonsson	Sweden

The men's 50 metre rifle, prone was a shooting sports event held as part of the Shooting at the 1948 Summer Olympics programme. It was the sixth appearance of the event. The competition was held on 3 August 1948 at the shooting ranges at London. 71 shooters from 26 nations competed.

== Medalists ==
Gold	Silver	Bronze
Art Cook; United States	Walter Tomsen; United States	Jonas Jonsson; Sweden

== Results ==
Place	Shooter	Total
1	Art Cook (USA)	599
2	Walter Tomsen (USA)	599
3	Jonas Jonsson (SWE)	597
4	Halvor Kongsjorden (NOR)	597
5	Thore Skredegaard (NOR)	597
6	Enrique Baldwin (PER)	596
7	Albert Ravila (FIN)	596
8	Willy Røgeberg (NOR)	596
9	Harry Cail (USA)	596
10	Uno Berg (SWE)	595
11	Gustaf Nielsen (DEN)	595
12	Otto Horber (SUI)	595
13	Antônio Guimarães (BRA)	594
14	Veijo Kaakinen (FIN)	594
15	John Chandler (GBR)	593
16	Onni Hynninen (FIN)	593
17	César Jayme (PHI)	593
18	George Jones (GBR)	592
19	Erland Koch (SWE)	592
20	Georges Gauthier-Lafond (FRA)	592
21	Victor Gilbert (GBR)	591
22	Albert von Einsiedel (PHI)	591
23	Jacques Lafortune (BEL)	591
24	Lucien Genot (FRA)	591
25	George Johnson (PUR)	590
26	Oscar Lozano (MEX)	590
27	M. Bouchez (FRA)	589
28	Manoel Braga (BRA)	589
29	Jan Hendrik Brussaard (NED)	588
30	Gustavo Huet (MEX)	588
31	Orlando Santamaría (CUB)	588
32	Erik Sætter-Lassen (DEN)	588
33	Jacques Delval (BEL)	587
34	Emil Grünig (SUI)	587
35	Augusto Larrabure (PER)	586
36	Michel Ravarino (MON)	586
37	Wilfredo Coto (CUB)	586
38	Ilias Valatas (GRE)	586
39	Marcel Lafortune (BEL)	586
40	Georgios Vikhos (GRE)	586
41	Luis Mantilla (PER)	586
42	Børge Christensen (DEN)	585
43	Martin Gison (PHI)	585
44	Julio Nolasco (ARG)	585
45	João de Faria (BRA)	584
46	Claude Platt (AUS)	584
47	Neville Holt (AUS)	584
48	Antonio Ando (ARG)	584
49	David Schiaffino (ARG)	583
50	Andreas Krapf (AUT)	581
51	Geurt Schoonman (NED)	580
52	Pierre Marsan (MON)	580
53	José de la Torre (MEX)	580
54	Rinaldo Capuzzi (ITA)	579
55	Leo Dove (AUS)	578
56	Mario Ciocco (SUI)	576
57	Abílio Brandão (POR)	576
58	Richard Bohslavsky (AUT)	575
59	Luigi Adami (ITA)	573
60	Ernst Wöll (AUT)	573
61	Christiaan Both (NED)	572
62	Cristóbal Tauler (ESP)	572
63	Carlos Queiroz (POR)	572
64	José Manuel Andoin (ESP)	571
65	Athanasios Aravositas (GRE)	570
66	José da Silva (POR)	570
67	Mahmoud Sakhaie (IRI)	552
68	Roger Abel (MON)	551
69	Farhang Khosro Panah (IRI)	545
70	Salem Salam (LIB)	544
71	Samad Molla Zal (IRI)	511
