= Monaco at the 1928 Summer Olympics =

- IOC code: MON
- NOC: Comité Olympique Monégasque

in Amsterdam
- Competitors: 7 men in 3 sports
- Medals: Gold 0 Silver 0 Bronze 0 Total 0

Summer Olympics appearances (overview)
- 1920; 1924; 1928; 1932; 1936; 1948; 1952; 1956; 1960; 1964; 1968; 1972; 1976; 1980; 1984; 1988; 1992; 1996; 2000; 2004; 2008; 2012; 2016; 2020; 2024

Monaco competed at the 1928 Summer Olympics held at Amsterdam in the Netherlands.

== Athletics ==
Men
Track & Field

Athlete	Event	Final	
Athlete	Event	Points	Position
Gaston Médécin	Decathlon	did not finish	

Men
Field Events

Athlete	Event	Qualification		Final	
Athlete	Event	Distance	Position	Distance	Position
Gaston Médécin	Long Jump	6.51	34T	did not advance	

== Rowing ==
Ranks given are within the heat.

Rower	Event	Round One		Repechage 1		Round Two		Round Three		Semifinals		Final	
Rower	Event	Result	Rank	Result	Rank	Result	Rank	Result	Rank	Result	Rank	Result	Rank
Alexandre Devissi; Louis Giobergia; Charles Gardetto; Émile Gardetto; Pierre Levesy	Coxed four	Unknown	2 r	8:02.4	2	did not advance							

== Sailing ==
Sailor	Event	Final	
Sailor	Event	Points	Rank
Émile Barral	12' Dinghy	did not finish	

== Art Competition ==
Monaco had three men represent them in these competitions, Michel Ravarino, Marc-Cesar Scotto and Auguste Philippe Marocco.
