= Monaco at the 2012 Summer Olympics =

- IOC code: MON
- NOC: Monégasque Olympic Committee
- Website: www.comite-olympique.mc (in French)

in London
- Competitors: 6 in 6 sports
- Flag bearers: Angélique Trinquier (opening); Damien Desprat (closing)
- Medals: Gold 0 Silver 0 Bronze 0 Total 0

Summer Olympics appearances (overview)
- 1920; 1924; 1928; 1932; 1936; 1948; 1952; 1956; 1960; 1964; 1968; 1972; 1976; 1980; 1984; 1988; 1992; 1996; 2000; 2004; 2008; 2012; 2016; 2020; 2024

Monaco competed at the 2012 Summer Olympics in London from 27 July to 12 August 2012. This was the nation's 19th consecutive Olympiad since its debut in 1920.

The Monégasque Olympic Committee sent the nation's largest delegation to the Games since the 1988 Summer Olympics in Seoul, South Korea. A total of six athletes, five men and one woman, competed. Monaco continued its medal-less streak started after the 1924 Games.

== Background ==
Monaco made their Olympic debut at the 1920 Summer Olympics in Antwerp, Belgium and they had appeared at every Summer Olympics since. The 2012 Summer Olympics in London, England, United Kingdom marked Monaco's 19th appearance at a Summer Olympics and the six athletes present was their largest delegation since the 1988 Summer Olympics in Seoul, South Korea. Prior to 2012, Monaco had not won an Olympic medal since the 1924 Summer Olympics in Paris, France.

== Competitors ==
In total, six athletes represented Moncao at the 2012 Summer Olympics in London, England, United Kingdom across six different sports.

Sport	Men	Women	Total
Athletics	1	0	1
Judo	1	0	1
Rowing	1	0	1
Sailing	1	0	1
Swimming	0	1	1
Triathlon	1	0	1
Total	5	1	6

== Athletics ==
In total, one Monégasque athlete participated in the athletics events – Brice Etès in the men's 800 m.

Athlete	Event	Heat		Semifinal		Final	
Athlete	Event	Result	Rank	Result	Rank	Result	Rank
Brice Etès	800 m	DSQ		Did not advance			

== Judo ==
In total, one Monégasque athlete participated in the judo events – Yann Siccardi in the men's −60 kg category.

Athlete	Event	Round of 64	Round of 32	Round of 16	Quarterfinals	Semifinals	Repechage	Final / BM	
Athlete	Event	Opposition Result	Opposition Result	Opposition Result	Opposition Result	Opposition Result	Opposition Result	Opposition Result	Rank
Yann Siccardi	Men's −60 kg	Bye	Khousrof (YEM); W 0101–0012	Galstyan (RUS); L 0000–0100	Did not advance				

== Rowing ==
In total, one Monégasque athlete participated in the rowing events – Mathias Raymond in the men's single sculls.

Athlete	Event	Heats		Repechage		Quarterfinals		Semifinals		Final	
Athlete	Event	Time	Rank	Time	Rank	Time	Rank	Time	Rank	Time	Rank
Mathias Raymond	Single sculls	6:58.60	3 QF	Bye		7:20.16	5 SC/D	7:38.17	3 FC	7:36.35	18

== Sailing ==
In total, one Monégasque athlete participated in the sailing events – Damien Desprat in the men's laser.

Athlete	Event	Race											Net points	Final rank
Athlete	Event	1	2	3	4	5	6	7	8	9	10	M*	Net points	Final rank
Damien Desprat	Laser	44	45	45	39	40	43	42	32	41	25	EL	351	45

== Swimming ==
In total, one Monégasque athlete participated in the swimming events – Angélique Trinquier in the women's 100 m backstroke.

Athlete	Event	Heat		Semifinal		Final	
Athlete	Event	Time	Rank	Time	Rank	Time	Rank
Angélique Trinquier	100 m backstroke	1:10.79	45	Did not advance			

== Triathlon ==
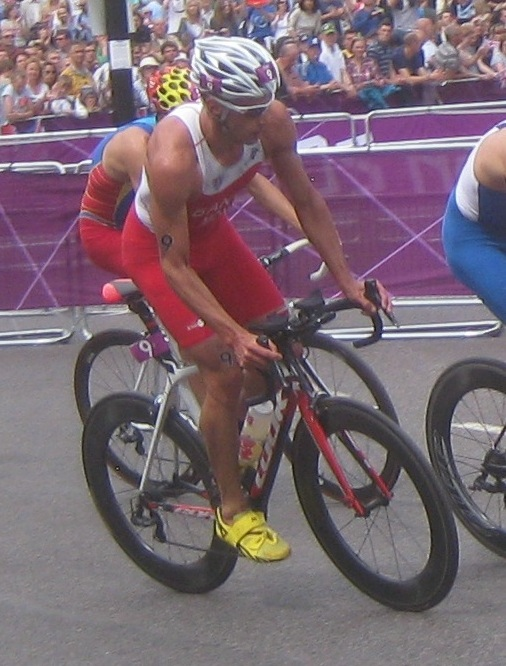
Monégasque triathlete Hervé Banti.

In total, one Monégasque athlete participated in the triathlon events – Hervé Banti in the men's race.

Athlete	Event	Swim (1.5 km)	Trans 1	Bike (40 km)	Trans 2	Run (10 km)	Total Time	Rank
Hervé Banti	Men's	18:55	0:40	58:51	0:32	33:44	1:52:42	49
