= Monaco at the 1992 Summer Olympics =

- IOC code: MON
- NOC: Comité Olympique Monégasque

in Barcelona
- Competitors: 2 in 2 sports
- Flag bearer: Christophe Verdino
- Medals: Gold 0 Silver 0 Bronze 0 Total 0

Summer Olympics appearances (overview)
- 1920; 1924; 1928; 1932; 1936; 1948; 1952; 1956; 1960; 1964; 1968; 1972; 1976; 1980; 1984; 1988; 1992; 1996; 2000; 2004; 2008; 2012; 2016; 2020; 2024

Monaco participated at the 1992 Summer Olympics in Barcelona, Spain held between 25 July and 9 August 1992. The country's participation in the Games marked its fourteenth appearance at the Summer Olympics since its debut in the 1920 Games.

The Monaco team consisted of two athletes who competed across two sports. Christophe Verdino served as the country's flag-bearer during the opening ceremony. Monaco did not win any medal in the Games, and has not won a Summer Olympics medal as of these Games.

== Background ==
Monaco first participated in Olympic competition at the 1920 Antwerp Olympics, and have participated in most Summer Olympic Games since. The Comité Olympique Monégasque (the National Olympic Committee (NOC) of Monaco) was recognized by the International Olympic Committee on 1 January 1953. After the nation made its debut in the 1920 Games, this edition of the Games in 1992 marked the nation's fourteenth appearance at the Summer Games.

The 1992 Summer Olympics was held in Barcelona between 25 July and 9 August 1992. The Monegasque team consisted of two athletes who competed across two sports. Christophe Verdino served as the country's flag-bearer during the opening ceremony. Monaco did not win any medal in the Games, and has not won a Summer Olympics medal as of these Games.

== Competitors ==
Monaco sent two athletes who competed in two sports at the Games.

Sport	Men	Women	Total
Shooting	0	1	1
Swimming	1	0	1
Total	1	1	2

== Shooting ==
Shooting events were held between 26 July and 2 August 1992 at the Camp de Tir Olímpic at Mollet del Vallès. There were 13 medal events including seven for men, four for women, and two mixed events. Fabienne Pasetti was the lone Monegasque representative in the shooting competition. This was Pasetti's second consecutive Olympic appearance in the air rifle event after her debut in the 1988 Games.

In the qualifying rounds for the 10 metre air rifle event held on 26th July, Pasetti shot a score of 381 and was ranked joint 39th amongst the 45 competitors. She began well with a score of 97 out of 100 in the first round. However, she missed five shots in the second round, and eight in the third round to slip down the table. Though she improved on the final round to score a 97, she did not make it to the finals.

Athlete	Event	Qualifier		Final	
Athlete	Event	Score	Rank	Score	Rank
Fabienne Pasetti	10 metre air rifle	381	=39	Did not qualify	–

== Swimming ==
Swimming events were held between 26 and 31 July 1992 at the Piscinas Bernat Picornell in Barcelona. Flag-bearer Christophe Verdino was the lone Monegasque representative in the shooting competition. He participated in three events in the competition. This was Verdino's debut at the Summer Olympics.

In the men's 100 m breaststroke event, there were 59 participants. Though Verdino finished second in his heats, he was classified 47th overall and did not advance to the next round. In the 200 m breaststroke event, he was ranked 36th amongst the 54 participants in the heats and failed to progress. In his final event of 200 m individual medley, he finishes third in his heat and 43rd in the overall classification.

Athlete	Event	Heats		Semi-final		Final	
Athlete	Event	Score	Rank	Score	Rank	Score	Rank
Christophe Verdino	Men's 100 m breaststroke	1:07.90	47	Did not qualify			
Christophe Verdino	Men's 200 m breaststroke	381	36	Did not qualify			
Christophe Verdino	Men's 200 m individual medley	381	43	Did not qualify			
