= Richard Flynn =

Richard Flynn or Dick Flynn may refer to:

- Dick Flynn (American football) (born 1943), American football player and coach
- Dick Flynn (Australian footballer) (1926–1949), Australian rules footballer
- Richard Flynn (sound engineer), New Zealand-British sound engineer
- Richard Flynn (sport shooter) (1933–2025), Irish sport shooter
- Richard M. Flynn, chairman of the New York Power Authority, namesake of the Richard M. Flynn Power Plant
