= Monaco at the 1996 Summer Olympics =

- IOC code: MON
- NOC: Comité Olympique Monégasque
- Website: www.comite-olympique.mc (in French)

in Atlanta
- Competitors: 3
- Flag bearer: Thierry Vatrican
- Medals: Gold 0 Silver 0 Bronze 0 Total 0

Summer Olympics appearances (overview)
- 1920; 1924; 1928; 1932; 1936; 1948; 1952; 1956; 1960; 1964; 1968; 1972; 1976; 1980; 1984; 1988; 1992; 1996; 2000; 2004; 2008; 2012; 2016; 2020; 2024

Monaco competed at the 1996 Summer Olympics in Atlanta, Georgia, United States.

== Results by event ==
=== Swimming ===
Men's 100m Breaststroke

- Christophe Verdino
  1. Heat – 01:05.66 (→ did not advance, 36th place)

Men's 200m Breaststroke

- Christophe Verdino
  1. Heat – 2:20.77 (→ did not advance, 27th place)
