= Monaco at the 2005 Mediterranean Games =

- IOC code: MON
- NOC: Comité Olympique Monégasque

in Almería
- Medals Ranked —th: Gold 0 Silver 0 Bronze 0 Total 0

Mediterranean Games appearances (overview)
- 1955; 1959; 1963; 1967–1971; 1975; 1979; 1983; 1987; 1991; 1993; 1997; 2001; 2005; 2009; 2013; 2018; 2022

Monaco (MON) competed at the 2005 Mediterranean Games in Almería, Spain. The nation had a total number of 16 participants (15 men and 1 woman).

== Results by event ==
| Participant | Event |
|---|---|
| Anthony De Sevelinges | Men's 110m Hurdles |
| Florent Battistel | Men's 400m |
| Mouflard Roland | Men's Individual Épée |
| Vincent Tonelli | Men's Individual Épée |
| Jean-François Calmes | Men's Individual Golf |
| Edmond-P. LeCourt | Men's Individual Golf |
| Charles-Henry Rey | Men's Individual Golf |
| Charles-Henry Rey, Edmond-P. LeCourt, & Jean-François Calmes | Men's Team Golf |
| Mathias Raymond | Men's Single Sculls Rowing |
| Matthieu Mariani & Sébastien Peillon | Men's Double-handed Dinghy-470 |
| Mickaël Battaglia | Men's Singles Table Tennis |
| Romain Loulergue | Men's Singles Table Tennis |
| Mickaël Battaglia & Romain Loulergue | Men's Doubles Table Tennis |
| Fabienne Pasetti | Women's 10m Air Rifle |

== See also ==
- Monaco at the 2004 Summer Olympics
- Monaco at the 2008 Summer Olympics
