= Monaco at the 1988 Summer Olympics =

- IOC code: MON
- NOC: Comité Olympique Monégasque

in Seoul
- Competitors: 9 (8 men and 1 woman) in 7 sports
- Flag bearer: Stéphane Operto (cycling)
- Medals: Gold 0 Silver 0 Bronze 0 Total 0

Summer Olympics appearances (overview)
- 1920; 1924; 1928; 1932; 1936; 1948; 1952; 1956; 1960; 1964; 1968; 1972; 1976; 1980; 1984; 1988; 1992; 1996; 2000; 2004; 2008; 2012; 2016; 2020; 2024

Monaco competed at the 1988 Summer Olympics in Seoul, South Korea. Nine competitors, eight men and one woman, took part in nine events in seven sports.

== Competitors ==
The following is the list of number of competitors in the Games.

Sport	Men	Women	Total
Archery	1	0	1
Athletics	1	0	1
Cycling	1	0	1
Fencing	1	0	1
Judo	2	–	2
Sailing	2	0	2
Shooting	0	1	1
Total	8	1	9

== Archery ==
Men's individual

- Gilles Cresto - preliminary round, 65th place

== Cycling ==
One male cyclists represented Monaco in 1988.

Men's road race

- Stéphane Operto

== Fencing ==
One male fencer represented Monaco in 1988.

Men's sabre

- Olivier Martini
