= Monaco at the 2024 Summer Olympics =

- IOC code: MON
- NOC: Comité Olympique Monégasque
- Website: www.comite-olympique.mc (in French)

in Paris, France 26 July 2024 – 11 August 2024
- Competitors: 6 (3 men and 3 women) in 5 sports
- Flag bearers: Théo Druenne & Lisa Pou
- Medals: Gold 0 Silver 0 Bronze 0 Total 0

Summer Olympics appearances (overview)
- 1920; 1924; 1928; 1932; 1936; 1948; 1952; 1956; 1960; 1964; 1968; 1972; 1976; 1980; 1984; 1988; 1992; 1996; 2000; 2004; 2008; 2012; 2016; 2020; 2024; 2028

Monaco competed at the 2024 Summer Olympics in Paris, which took place from 26 July 2024 to 11 August 2024. It was the nation's twenty-second appearance at the Summer Olympics.

The Monaco team consisted of six athletes competing in five sports. Swimmers Théo Druenne and Lisa Pou were the country's flagbearers during the opening ceremony.

== Competitors ==
The following is the list of number of competitors in the Games.

Sport	Men	Women	Total
Athletics	0	1	1
Judo	1	0	1
Rowing	1	0	1
Swimming	1	1	2
Table tennis	0	1	1
Total	3	3	6

== Athletics ==
Monaco sent one sprinter to compete at the 2024 Summer Olympics.

Key

- Note–Ranks given for track events are within the athlete's heat only
- Q = Qualified for the next round
- q = Qualified for the next round as a fastest loser or, in field events, by position without achieving the qualifying target
- NR = National record
- N/A = Round not applicable for the event
- Bye = Athlete not required to compete in round

Track & road events

Athlete	Event	Preliminary		Heats		Quarterfinals		Semifinals		Final	
Athlete	Event	Result	Rank	Result	Rank	Result	Rank	Result	Rank	Result	Rank
Marie-Charlotte Gastaud	Women's 100 m	12.41	21 PB	Did not advance							

== Judo ==
Monaco entered one judoka to compete at the Olympic tournament. Marvin Gadeau qualified for the games through the allocations of universality places.

Athlete	Event	Round of 32	Round of 16	Quarterfinals	Semifinals	Final	
Athlete	Event	Opposition Result	Opposition Result	Opposition Result	Opposition Result	Opposition Result	Rank
Marvin Gadeau	Men's +100 kg	Bye	Granda (CUB); L 00–10	Did not advance			

== Rowing ==
Monaco qualified one boat in the men's single sculls events for Paris 2024. Tokyo 2020 Olympian, Quentin Antognelli directly secured his spots through the allocation process of universality spots.

Athlete	Event	Heats		Repechage		Quarterfinals		Semifinals		Final	
Athlete	Event	Time	Rank	Time	Rank	Time	Rank	Time	Rank	Time	Rank
Quentin Antognelli	Men's single sculls	7:02.15	4 R	7:10.00	1 QF	6:58.89	5 SC/D	7:14.32	5 FD	6:54.93	19

Qualification Legend: FD=Final D (non-medal); SC/D=Semifinals C/D; SE/F=Semifinals E/F; QF=Quarterfinals; R=Repechage

== Swimming ==
Monégasque swimmers achieved the entry standards in the following events for Paris 2024 (a maximum of two swimmers under the designated competition and Universality Place:

Athlete	Event	Heat		Semifinal		Final	
Athlete	Event	Time	Rank	Time	Rank	Time	Rank
Théo Druenne	Men's 800 m freestyle	8:25.01	31	—N/a		Did not advance	
Lisa Pou	Women's 10 km open water	—N/a				2:07:05.4	18

== Table tennis ==
Monaco entered one table tennis player into Paris 2024. Yang Xiaoxin qualified for the games as the highest eligible ranked women's single players from Europe in the Olympics ranking.

Athlete	Event	Preliminary	Round of 64	Round of 32	Round of 16	Quarterfinals	Semifinals	Final / BM	
Athlete	Event	Opposition Result	Opposition Result	Opposition Result	Opposition Result	Opposition Result	Opposition Result	Opposition Result	Rank
Yang Xiaoxin	Women's singles	Bye	Matelová (CZE); L 2–4	Did not advance					

== See also ==
- Monaco at the 2024 Winter Youth Olympics
