= Påhlsson =

Påhlsson is a Swedish-language surname. Notable people with the surname include:

- Johnny Påhlsson (1941–2009), Swedish sport shooter
- Samuel Påhlsson (born 1977), Swedish former professional ice hockey player
