= Monaco at the 2022 Mediterranean Games =

- IOC code: MON
- NOC: Monégasque Olympic Committee

in Oran, Algeria 25 June 2022 – 6 July 2022
- Competitors: 17
- Medals Ranked 22nd: Gold 1 Silver 0 Bronze 0 Total 1

Mediterranean Games appearances (overview)
- 1955; 1959; 1963; 1967–1971; 1975; 1979; 1983; 1987; 1991; 1993; 1997; 2001; 2005; 2009; 2013; 2018; 2022

Monaco competed at the 2022 Mediterranean Games held in Oran, Algeria from 25 June to 6 July 2022.

Albert II, Prince of Monaco attended judo competitions as a guest on 30 June.

== Medalists ==
Medal	Name	Sport	Event	Date
Gold	Xiaoxin Yang	Table tennis	Women's singles	

== Artistic gymnastics ==
Kevin Crovetto competed in the men's artistic individual all-around event.

== Athletics ==
Monaco competed in athletics.

== Boules ==
Monaco competed in boules.

== Cycling ==
Monaco competed in cycling.

== Equestrian ==
Monaco competed in equestrian.

== Judo ==
Monaco competed in judo.

Men

Athlete	Event	Round of 16	Quarterfinals	Semifinals	Repechage 1	Repechage 2	Final / BM	
Athlete	Event	Opposition Result	Opposition Result	Opposition Result	Opposition Result	Opposition Result	Opposition Result	Rank
Nicolas Grinda	90 kg	Damier (FRA); L 00–10	did not advance					10
Marvin Gadeau	+100 kg	Esseryry (MAR); L 00–10	did not advance					9

== Sailing ==
Monaco competed in sailing.

== Swimming ==
Monaco competed in swimming.

Men

Athlete	Event	Heat		Final	
Athlete	Event	Time	Rank	Time	Rank
Théo Druenne	400 m freestyle	4:08.36	12	did not advance	
Théo Druenne	1500 m freestyle	16:33.07	11	did not advance	

Women

Athlete	Event	Heat		Final	
Athlete	Event	Time	Rank	Time	Rank
Claudia Verdino	50 m breaststroke	34.33	10	did not advance	
Claudia Verdino	100 m breaststroke	1:17.41	12	did not advance	

== Table tennis ==
Xiaoxin Yang won the gold medal in the women's singles event.

== Tennis ==
Monaco competed in tennis.

Men

Athlete	Event	Round of 32	Round of 16	Quarterfinals	Semifinals	Final / BM	
Athlete	Event	Opposition Score	Opposition Score	Opposition Score	Opposition Score	Opposition Score	Rank
Lucas Catarina	Singles	Bye	Efstathiou (CYP); W 6-3, 7-5	López Montagud (ESP); L 2-6, 6-3, 3-6	did not advance		
