= Roger Abel =

Roger Abel may refer to:

- Roger Abel (sport shooter) (1900–1982), Monegasque sport shooter
- Roger Abel (speedway rider) (born 1954), New Zealand speedway rider
