= Armando Marques =

Armando Marques may refer to:

- Armando Marques (sport shooter) (born 1937), Portuguese sport shooter
- Armando Marques (referee) (1930–2014), Brazilian football referee
