= Monaco at the 2013 Mediterranean Games =

Sporting event delegation

- IOC code: MON
- NOC: Comité Olympique Monégasque

in Mersin
- Medals: Gold 0 Silver 0 Bronze 0 Total 0

Mediterranean Games appearances (overview)
- 1955; 1959; 1963; 1967–1971; 1975; 1979; 1983; 1987; 1991; 1993; 1997; 2001; 2005; 2009; 2013; 2018; 2022; 2026

Monaco competed at the 2013 Mediterranean Games held in Mersin, Turkey, from 20 to 30 June 2013. The country did not win any medals.

== Cycling ==
Athlete	Event	Time	Rank
Nicolas d'Angelo	Men's road race	3:20:15	24
Nicolas d'Angelo	Men's time trial	37:43.11	18

== Sailing ==
Men

Athlete	Event	Race											Net points	Final rank
Athlete	Event	1	2	3	4	5	6	7	8	9	10	M*	Net points	Final rank
Damien Desprat	Laser													

== Taekwondo ==
Athlete	Event	Round of 16	Quarterfinals	Semifinals	Repechage 1	Repechage 2	Final / BM	
Athlete	Event	Opposition Result	Opposition Result	Opposition Result	Opposition Result	Opposition Result	Opposition Result	Rank
Anouk Doria	Women's −49 kg							
