= Michel Porasso =

Monegasque gymnast (1891–1944)

- Full name: Michel Émile Porasso
- Born: 20 August 1891 Monaco City, Monaco
- Died: 6 August 1944 (aged 52)

Gymnastics career
- Discipline: Men's artistic gymnastics
- Country represented: Monaco

Michel Émile Porasso (20 August 1891 – 6 August 1944) was a Monegasque gymnast. Born in Monaco, he would compete at the 1920 Summer Olympics, representing Monaco in men's artistic gymnastics. He would be one of the first Monegasque athletes to compete at an Olympic Games as the nation would debut at these Summer Games.

Porasso would compete in the men's artistic individual all-around event, which consisted a total of five combined events. There, he would place 12th out of the 25 competitors who participated in the event.

== Biography ==
Michel Émile Porasso was born on 20 August 1891 in Monaco. Porasso would compete at the 1920 Summer Olympics in Antwerp, Belgium, representing Monaco in men's artistic gymnastics. He would be one of the first Monegasque athletes to compete at an Olympic Games, as the nation had made its first appearance at these Summer Games. The entire team would be composed of four athletes.

Alongside his teammate Joseph Crovetto, Porasso would compete in the men's artistic individual all-around event which consists of the floor exercise, rings, parallel bars, horizontal bar, and pommel horse. Each exercise would be worth up to 12 points, which would then be added to get a total number of points attributed to each athlete. The pair would compete on 26 August in the Olympisch Stadion. There, Porasso would score a total of 81.40 points out of a possible 96, placing twelfth among the twenty-five competitors who participated in the event.

Porasso later died on 6 August 1944.
