= Qabil =

Qabil transliterates two different Arabic names: قابيل (the name of Cain) and قابل. It may refer to:

== People ==
=== Given name ===
- Habil and Qabil, or Cain and Abel
- Qabil Ajmeri (1931–1962), Indian-Pakistani Urdu poet
- Qabil Ambak (born 1980), Malaysian equestrian rider

=== Surname ===
- Maulawi Qabil, detainee in Bagram
- Mohammed Qabel (born 1988), Iraqi footballer
- Thuraya Qabil (1940–2026), Saudi Arabian poet and journalist

== Places ==
- Al-Qabil, a province in ash-Sharqiya North Governorate, Oman
- Al Qabil, Al Buraimi, a village in al-Buraimi Governorate, Oman
- Qaryat al-Qabil, a village in Yemen

== See also ==
- Ghabel (disambiguation), a related name
- Kabil (disambiguation), a related name
- Qabiil, the Somali word for clan
