= Monaco at the 2020 Summer Olympics =

- IOC code: MON
- NOC: Comité Olympique Monégasque
- Website: www.comite-olympique.mc (in French)

in Tokyo 23 July 2021 – 8 August 2021
- Competitors: 6 in 5 sports
- Flag bearers (opening): Yang Xiaoxin; Quentin Antognelli
- Flag bearer (closing): Games Volunteer
- Medals: Gold 0 Silver 0 Bronze 0 Total 0

Summer Olympics appearances (overview)
- 1920; 1924; 1928; 1932; 1936; 1948; 1952; 1956; 1960; 1964; 1968; 1972; 1976; 1980; 1984; 1988; 1992; 1996; 2000; 2004; 2008; 2012; 2016; 2020; 2024

Monaco competed at the 2020 Summer Olympics in Tokyo. Originally scheduled to take place from 24 July to 9 August 2020, the Games were rescheduled for 23 July to 8 August 2021, due to the COVID-19 pandemic. Since the nation's official debut in 1920, Monegasque athletes have appeared in every edition of the Summer Olympic Games throughout the modern era, except for three occasions; Monaco did not attend the 1932 Summer Olympics in Los Angeles during the period of the worldwide Great Depression, failed to register any athletes at the 1956 Summer Olympics in Melbourne, and also joined the United States-led boycott when Moscow hosted the 1980 Summer Olympics.

== Competitors ==
The following is the list of number of competitors in the Games.

Sport	Men	Women	Total
Athletics	0	1	1
Judo	1	0	1
Rowing	1	0	1
Swimming	1	1	2
Table tennis	0	1	1
Total	3	3	6

== Athletics ==
Monaco received a universality slot from the World Athletics to send a female track and field athlete to the Olympics.

Key

- Note–Ranks given for track events are within the athlete's heat only
- Q = Qualified for the next round
- q = Qualified for the next round as a fastest loser or, in field events, by position without achieving the qualifying target
- NR = National record
- N/A = Round not applicable for the event
- Bye = Athlete not required to compete in round

Track & road events

Athlete	Event	Heat		Quarterfinal		Semifinal		Final	
Athlete	Event	Result	Rank	Result	Rank	Result	Rank	Result	Rank
Charlotte Afriat	Women's 100 m	12.35	5	Did not advance					

== Judo ==
Monaco entered one male judoka into the Olympic tournament after International Judo Federation awarded them a tripartite invitation quota.

Athlete	Event	Round of 64	Round of 32	Round of 16	Quarterfinals	Semifinals	Repechage	Final / BM	
Athlete	Event	Opposition Result	Opposition Result	Opposition Result	Opposition Result	Opposition Result	Opposition Result	Opposition Result	Rank
Cédric Bessi	Men's –73 kg	Bye	Diallo (BUR); W 10–00	Tsend-Ochir (MGL); L 01–11	Did not advance				

== Rowing ==
Monaco received an invitation from the Tripartite Commission to send a rower in the men's single sculls to the Tokyo regatta, signifying the nation's return to the sport for the first time since London 2012.

Athlete	Event	Heats		Repechage		Quarterfinals		Semifinals		Final	
Athlete	Event	Time	Rank	Time	Rank	Time	Rank	Time	Rank	Time	Rank
Quentin Antognelli	Men's single sculls	7:10.52	4 R	7:34.14	1 QF	7:29.99	4 SC/D	7:06.03	2 FC	7:01.85	15

Qualification Legend: FA=Final A (medal); FB=Final B (non-medal); FC=Final C (non-medal); FD=Final D (non-medal); FE=Final E (non-medal); FF=Final F (non-medal); SA/B=Semifinals A/B; SC/D=Semifinals C/D; SE/F=Semifinals E/F; QF=Quarterfinals; R=Repechage

== Swimming ==
Monaco received a universality invitation from FINA to send two top-ranked swimmers (one per gender) in their respective individual events to the Olympics, based on the FINA Points System of June 28, 2021.

Athlete	Event	Heat		Semifinal		Final	
Athlete	Event	Time	Rank	Time	Rank	Time	Rank
Theo Druenne	Men's 1500 m freestyle	16:17.20	28	—N/a		Did not advance	
Claudia Verdino	Women's 100 m breaststroke	DSQ		Did not advance			

== Table tennis ==
Monaco entered one athlete into the table tennis competition for the first time at the Games. Chinese-born Xiaoxin Yang scored a fourth-match final triumph to book one of the five available places in the women's singles at the 2021 ITTF World Qualification Tournament in Doha, Qatar.

Athlete	Event	Preliminary	Round of 64	Round of 32	Round of 16	Quarterfinals	Semifinals	Final / BM		
Athlete	Event	Opposition Result	Opposition Result	Opposition Result	Opposition Result	Opposition Result	Opposition Result	Opposition Result	Opposition Result	Rank
Yang Xiaoxin	Women's singles	Bye		Trifonova (BUL); W 4–1	Sun Ys (CHN); L 0–4	Did not advance				
