= Azcue =

Azcue is a surname. Notable people with the surname include:

- Esteban Azcue (born 1944), Spanish sports shooter
- Joe Azcue (born 1939), Cuban baseball player
