= Veijo =

Surname list

Veijo is a given name. Notable people with the name include:

- Veijo Baltzar (born 1942), Romani author and visual artist
- Veijo-Lassi Holopainen (1921–2006), Finnish field hockey player
- Veijo Kaakinen (1907–1976), Finnish sports shooter
- Veijo Meri (1928–2015), Finnish writer
- Veijo Mikkolainen (1925–2013), Finnish rower
- Veijo Niemi (born 1954), Finnish politician
- Veijo Pasanen (1930–1988), Finnish actor
- Veijo Puhjo (1948–2019), Finnish politician
- Veijo Tahvanainen, Finnish orienteering competitor
- Veijo Vannesluoma (born 1958), Finnish pole vaulter
- Veijo Viinikka, Finnish darts player
