= Kabil =

Kabil is an Arabic masculine given name and surname. Notable people with the name include:

== Given name ==
- Kabil Lahsen (born 1971), Moroccan boxer and Olympics competitor
- Kabil Mahmoud, Egyptian gymnast and Olympics competitor

== Surname ==
- Mahmoud Kabil (born 1946), Egyptian actor and political activist
- Mohamed Kabil (1927–2023), Egyptian footballer and Olympics competitor

== See also ==
- Kaabil (film), 2017 Indian Hindi-language action thriller film
- Pyar Ke Kabil, 1987 Indian Bollywood film
- Ghabel (disambiguation), related name
- Qabil (disambiguation), related name
