= Óscar Lozano =

Óscar Lozano may refer to

- Oscar Lozano (sport shooter) (born 1928), Mexican sports shooter
- Óscar Lozano (footballer) (born 1996), Spanish footballer
