= Verdino =

Verdino is a surname. Notable people with the surname include:

- Christophe Verdino (born 1973), Monegasque swimmer
- Claudia Verdino (born 2001), Monegasque swimmer
