= Monaco at the 1964 Summer Olympics =

- IOC code: MON
- NOC: Comité Olympique Monégasque

in Tokyo
- Competitors: 1 in 1 sport
- Flag bearer: Joseph Asso
- Medals: Gold 0 Silver 0 Bronze 0 Total 0

Summer Olympics appearances (overview)
- 1920; 1924; 1928; 1932; 1936; 1948; 1952; 1956; 1960; 1964; 1968; 1972; 1976; 1980; 1984; 1988; 1992; 1996; 2000; 2004; 2008; 2012; 2016; 2020; 2024

Monaco competed at the 1964 Summer Olympics in Tokyo, Japan. One competitor competed in one sport.

== Weightlifting ==
Athlete	Event	Military press		Snatch		Clean & jerk		Total	
Athlete	Event	Weight	Rank	Weight	Rank	Weight	Rank	Weight	Rank
René Battaglia	82.5 kg	127.5	15	115.0	19	165.0	11	407.5	16
