= Monaco at the 2000 Summer Olympics =

- IOC code: MON
- NOC: Comité Olympique Monégasque
- Website: www.comite-olympique.mc (in French)

in Sydney
- Flag bearer: Thierry Vatrican
- Medals: Gold 0 Silver 0 Bronze 0 Total 0

Summer Olympics appearances (overview)
- 1920; 1924; 1928; 1932; 1936; 1948; 1952; 1956; 1960; 1964; 1968; 1972; 1976; 1980; 1984; 1988; 1992; 1996; 2000; 2004; 2008; 2012; 2016; 2020; 2024

Monaco competed at the 2000 Summer Olympics in Sydney, Australia.

== Results by event ==
=== Swimming ===
Men's 100 m breaststroke

- Sylvain Faure

- Preliminary Heat – 1:05.51 (→ did not advance)
