= Monaco at the 2016 Summer Olympics =

- IOC code: MON
- NOC: Comité Olympique Monégasque
- Website: www.comite-olympique.mc (in French)

in Rio de Janeiro
- Competitors: 3 in 3 sports
- Flag bearer: Brice Etès
- Medals: Gold 0 Silver 0 Bronze 0 Total 0

Summer Olympics appearances (overview)
- 1920; 1924; 1928; 1932; 1936; 1948; 1952; 1956; 1960; 1964; 1968; 1972; 1976; 1980; 1984; 1988; 1992; 1996; 2000; 2004; 2008; 2012; 2016; 2020; 2024

Monaco competed at the 2016 Summer Olympics in Rio de Janeiro, Brazil, from 5 to 21 August 2016. Since the nation's official debut in 1920, Monegasque athletes have appeared in every edition of the Summer Olympic Games throughout the modern era, except for three occasions. Monaco did not attend the 1932 Summer Olympics in Los Angeles at the period of the worldwide Great Depression, failed to register any athletes at the 1956 Summer Olympics in Melbourne, and also joined the United States-led boycott when Moscow hosted the 1980 Summer Olympics.

Monegasque Olympic Committee (French: Comité Olympique Monégasque, COM) selected a team of three male athletes to compete each in track and field, judo, and artistic gymnastics (the nation's Olympic return after nine decades) at the Games, failing to register women for the first time since the 1984 Summer Olympics in Los Angeles. Middle-distance runner and London 2012 Olympian Brice Etès (men's 800 m) served as the nation's flag bearer and the only Monegasque athlete to lead the delegation in the opening ceremony, as both artistic gymnast Kevin Crovetto and judoka Yann Siccardi decided to prepare for their competition on the first day of the Games.

== Athletics ==
Monaco has received a universality slot from IAAF to send a male athlete to the Olympics.

Key

- Note–Ranks given for track events are within the athlete's heat only
- Q = Qualified for the next round
- q = Qualified for the next round as a fastest loser or, in field events, by position without achieving the qualifying target
- NR = National record
- N/A = Round not applicable for the event
- Bye = Athlete not required to compete in round

Track and road events

Athlete	Event	Heat		Semifinal		Final	
Athlete	Event	Result	Rank	Result	Rank	Result	Rank
Brice Etès	Men's 800 m	1:50.40	8	Did not advance			

== Gymnastics ==
=== Artistic ===
Monaco has received an invitation from the Tripartite Commission to send a male gymnast to the Games, signifying the nation's Olympic return to the sport for the first time since 1920.

Men

Athlete	Event	Qualification								Final							
Athlete	Event	Apparatus						Total	Rank	Apparatus						Total	Rank
Athlete	Event	F	PH	R	V	PB	HB	Total	Rank	F	PH	R	V	PB	HB	Total	Rank
Kevin Crovetto	All-around	12.858	11.800	12.866	13.166	12.700	12.666	76.056	49	Did not advance							

== Judo ==
Monaco has received an invitation from the Tripartite Commission to send a judoka competing in the men's extra-lightweight category (60 kg) to the Olympics.

Athlete	Event	Round of 64	Round of 32	Round of 16	Quarterfinals	Semifinals	Repechage	Final / BM	
Athlete	Event	Opposition Result	Opposition Result	Opposition Result	Opposition Result	Opposition Result	Opposition Result	Opposition Result	Rank
Yann Siccardi	Men's −60 kg	Bye	Takato (JPN); L 000–101	Did not advance					

== See also ==
- Monaco at the 2015 European Games
