= Monaco at the 2008 Summer Olympics =

- IOC code: MON
- NOC: Comité Olympique Monégasque
- Website: www.comite-olympique.mc (in French)

in Beijing
- Competitors: 5 in 5 sports
- Flag bearer: Mathias Raymond
- Medals: Gold 0 Silver 0 Bronze 0 Total 0

Summer Olympics appearances (overview)
- 1920; 1924; 1928; 1932; 1936; 1948; 1952; 1956; 1960; 1964; 1968; 1972; 1976; 1980; 1984; 1988; 1992; 1996; 2000; 2004; 2008; 2012; 2016; 2020; 2024

Monaco was represented at the 2008 Summer Olympics in Beijing by the Comité Olympique Monégasque.

In total, five athletes represented Monaco in five different sports including athletics, judo, rowing, shooting and weightlifting.

== Athletics ==
One Monégasque athlete participated in the athletic events – Sébastien Gattuso in the men's 100 m.

The heats for the men's 100 m took place on 15 August 2008. Gattuso contested heat nine which took place at 10:49 am. He finished fifth in a time of 10.7 seconds and failed to advance to the semi-finals.

Men

Athlete	Event	Heat		Quarterfinal		Semifinal		Final	
Athlete	Event	Result	Rank	Result	Rank	Result	Rank	Result	Rank
Sébastien Gattuso	100 m	10.70	5	Did not advance					

== Judo ==
One Monégasque athlete participated in the judo events – Yann Siccardi in the men's −60 kg.

The men's −60 kg event took place on 9 August 2008. Siccardi received a bye in the preliminary round but lost by ippon to Craig Fallon of Great Britain in the round of 32.

Athlete	Event	Preliminary	Round of 32	Round of 16	Quarterfinals	Semifinals	Repechage 1	Repechage 2	Repechage 3	Final / BM	
Athlete	Event	Opposition Result	Opposition Result	Opposition Result	Opposition Result	Opposition Result	Opposition Result	Opposition Result	Opposition Result	Opposition Result	Rank
Yann Siccardi	−60 kg	Bye	Fallon (GBR); L 0000–1010	Did not advance							

== Rowing ==
One Monégasque athlete participated in the rowing events – Mathias Raymond in the men's single sculls.

The men's single sculls took place from 9–16 August 2008. Raymond contested heat four which took place at 3:20 pm on 9 August. He finished fourth in a time of 7 minutes 51.69 seconds and advanced to the quarterfinals. Raymond contested quarter-final one which took place at 4:10 pm on 11 August. He finished fifth in a time of 7 minutes 11.66 seconds and advanced to semi-final C/D. Raymond contested heat two of the C/D semi-final which took place at 3:20 pm on 13 August. He finished fifth in a time of 7 minutes 33.06 seconds and advanced to Final D. Final D took place on 15 August 2:40 pm. Raymond finished fourth in a time of 7 minutes 14.27 seconds to finish 22nd overall.

Men

Athlete	Event	Heats		Quarterfinals		Semifinals		Final	
Athlete	Event	Time	Rank	Time	Rank	Time	Rank	Time	Rank
Mathias Raymond	Single sculls	7:51.69	4 QF	7:11.66	5 SC/D	7:33.06	5 FD	7:14.27	22

Qualification Legend: FA=Final A (medal); FB=Final B (non-medal); FC=Final C (non-medal); FD=Final D (non-medal); FE=Final E (non-medal); FF=Final F (non-medal); SA/B=Semifinals A/B; SC/D=Semifinals C/D; SE/F=Semifinals E/F; QF=Quarterfinals; R=Repechage

== Shooting ==
One Monégasque athlete participated in the shooting events – Fabienne Pasetti in the women's 10 m air rifle.

The women's 10 m air rifle took place on 9 August 2008. Pasetti recorded a score of 387 in the preliminary round but did not advance to the final and finished 41st overall.

Women

Athlete	Event	Qualification		Final	
Athlete	Event	Points	Rank	Points	Rank
Fabienne Pasetti	10 m air rifle	387	41	Did not advance	

== Weightlifting ==
One Monégasque athlete participated in the weightlifting events – Romain Marchessou in the men's −77 kg.

The men's −77 kg took place on 13 August 2008. Marchessou lifted 110 kg (snatch) and 140 kg (clean and jerk) for a combined score of 250 kg which placed him 24th in the overall rankings.

Athlete	Event	Snatch		Clean & Jerk		Total	Rank
Athlete	Event	Result	Rank	Result	Rank	Total	Rank
Romain Marchessou	Men's −77 kg	110	27	140	24	250	24
