= San Marino at the Mediterranean Games =

- IOC code: SMR
- NOC: Sammarinese National Olympic Committee
- Medals Ranked 21st: Gold 7 Silver 10 Bronze 10 Total 27

Mediterranean Games appearances (overview)
- 1987; 1991; 1993; 1997; 2001; 2005; 2009; 2013; 2018; 2022; 2026

San Marino first appeared in the quadrennial Mediterranean Games in 1987, and has regularly continued to send athletes to the multi-sport event ever since.

== Overview ==
=== By event ===
Games	Athletes	Gold	Silver	Bronze	Total	Rank
1951–1983	Did not participate					
1987 Latakia	30	0	1	0	1	14th
1991 Athens	36	0	0	0	0	—
1993 Languedoc-Roussillon	13	0	1	0	1	16th
1997 Bari	37	0	1	0	1	15th
2001 Tunis	51	0	0	0	0	—
2005 Almería		0	1	0	1	18th
2009 Pescara	30	1	3	2	6	17th
2013 Mersin		0	2	3	5	17th
2018 Tarragona	16	2	0	0	2	18th
2022 Oran	20	2	1	3	6	17th
2026 Taranto	29	2	0	2	4	17th
Total		7	10	10	27	21st

== See also ==
- San Marino at the Olympics
- San Marino at the Paralympics
- San Marino at the European Games
