= Monaco at the 2018 Mediterranean Games =

- IOC code: MON
- NOC: Monégasque Olympic Committee

in Tarragona
- Competitors: 21 in 13 sports
- Medals Ranked 22nd: Gold 0 Silver 2 Bronze 0 Total 2

Mediterranean Games appearances (overview)
- 1955; 1959; 1963; 1967–1971; 1975; 1979; 1983; 1987; 1991; 1993; 1997; 2001; 2005; 2009; 2013; 2018; 2022

Monaco competed at the 2018 Mediterranean Games in Tarragona, Spain from the 22 June to 1 July 2018.

== Medal summary ==
=== Medal table ===
Medal	Name	Sport	Event	Date
Silver	Yang Xiaoxin	Table tennis	Women's singles	28 June
Silver	Lucas Catarina	Tennis	Men's singles	30 June

Medals by sport
Sport	1st place, gold medalist(s)	2nd place, silver medalist(s)	3rd place, bronze medalist(s)	Total
Table tennis	0	1	0	1
Tennis	0	1	0	1

Medals by date
Date	1st place, gold medalist(s)	2nd place, silver medalist(s)	3rd place, bronze medalist(s)	Total
28 June	0	1	0	1
30 June	0	1	0	1

== Athletics ==
Women
Track events

Athlete	Event	Semifinals		Final	
Athlete	Event	Result	Rank	Result	Rank
Charlotte Afriat	100 m	12.70	11	Did not advance	

== Beach volleyball ==
Men

Athlete	Preliminary round				Round of 16	Quarterfinals	Semifinals	Final / BM	
Athlete	Opposition Score	Opposition Score	Opposition Score	Rank	Opposition Score	Opposition Score	Opposition Score	Opposition Score	Rank
Pascal Ferry; Vincent Ferry	Giginoğlu / Göğtepe (TUR); L 17–21, 15–21	A. Huerta / J. Huerta (ESP); L 16–21, 17–21	Boussaid / Souadi (ALG); L 17–21, 26–24, 15–17	4	Did not advance				

== Boules ==
Lyonnaise

Athlete	Event	Heats				Semifinals	Final / BM	
Athlete	Event	Heat 1	Heat 2	Total	Rank	Opposition Score	Opposition Score	Rank
Florian Valeri	Men's precision throw	8	13	21	10	Did not advance		
Jessica Samarati	Women's precision throw	9	11	20	5	Did not advance		
Jessica Samarati	Women's progressive throw	25	24	49	6	Did not advance		

Pétanque

Athlete	Event	Preliminary round					Semifinals	Final / BM	
Athlete	Event	Round1	Rank	Round 2	Total	Rank	Opposition Score	Opposition Score	Rank
Michel Audino	Men's precision throw	25	16	Did not advance					
Jacky Petturiti	Men's precision throw	20	17	Did not advance					

Athlete	Event	Group stage					Semifinals	Final / BM	
Athlete	Event	Opposition Score	Opposition Score	Opposition Score	Opposition Score	Rank	Opposition Score	Opposition Score	Rank
Michel Audino; Jacky Petturiti	Men's doubles	Morocco (MAR); L 3–13	Italy (ITA); L 8–11	Spain (ESP); L 7–13	Andorra (AND); L 3–13	5	Did not advance		

== Boxing ==
Men

Athlete	Event	Round of 16	Quarterfinals	Semifinals	Final	
Athlete	Event	Opposition Result	Opposition Result	Opposition Result	Opposition Result	Rank
Hugo Micallef	Light welterweight	Mehah (FRA); L 0–5	Did not advance			

== Equestrian ==
Jumping

Athlete	Horse	Event	Qualification	Final		Total	
Athlete	Horse	Event	Qualification	Round 1	Round 2	Total	
Athlete	Horse	Event	Penalties	Penalties	Penalties	Penalties	Rank
Wenceslas Thomel	Tonic d'Ick	Individual	16	17	1	34	25

== Gymnastics ==
Artistic gymnastics

Men

Athlete	Event	Qualification								Final							
Athlete	Event	Apparatus						Total	Rank	Apparatus						Total	Rank
Athlete	Event	F	PH	R	V	PB	HB	Total	Rank	F	PH	R	V	PB	HB	Total	Rank
Kevin Crovetto	All-around	12.200	11.800	12.050	13.100	12.400	12.750	74.300	23 Q	11.900	12.000	12.200	12.950	12.650	12.700	74.400	17

== Judo ==
Men

Athlete	Event	Round of 16	Quarterfinals	Semifinals	Repechage 1	Repechage 2	Final / BM	
Athlete	Event	Opposition Result	Opposition Result	Opposition Result	Opposition Result	Opposition Result	Opposition Result	Rank
Yann Siccardi	–60 kg	Bye	Dhouibi (TUN); L 00–10	Did not advance	Štarkel (SLO); L 00–10	Did not advance		
Cédric Bessi	–73 kg	Basile (ITA); L 00–10	Did not advance		Nourine (ALG); L 01–10	Did not advance		
Nicolas Grinda	–90 kg	Tselidis (GRE); L 00–11	Did not advance		Martinho (POR); L 00–10	Did not advance		
Marvin Gadeau	+100 kg	Parra (ESP); L 00–10	Did not advance		Jaballah (TUN); L 00–10	Did not advance		

== Rowing ==
Men

Athlete	Event	Heats		Repechage		Semifinals		Final	
Athlete	Event	Time	Rank	Time	Rank	Time	Rank	Time	Rank
Quentin Antognelli	M1x	3:18.330	3 R	3:32.772	1 FA	—N/a		3:28.103	4

== Sailing ==
Athlete	Event	Race											Net points	Final rank
Athlete	Event	1	2	3	4	5	6	7	8	9	10	11	Net points	Final rank
Jérémy Moutout	Laser	~~15~~	13	9	7	5	10	5	3	12	11	6	81	8
Lisa Caussin	Laser Radial	~~15~~	15	14	12	15	14	15	15	14	7	15	136	14

== Swimming ==
Women

Athlete	Event	Heats		Final	
Athlete	Event	Time	Rank	Time	Rank
Claudia Verdino	200 m backstroke	—N/a		2:28.59	8
Claudia Verdino	200 m medley	2:28.86	13	Did not advance	

== Table tennis ==
Athlete	Event	Group stage 1		Group stage 2		Quarterfinal	Semifinals	Final / BM	
Athlete	Event	Pool Scores	Rank	Pool Scores	Rank	Opposition Score	Opposition Score	Opposition Score	Rank
Yang Xiaoxin	Women's singles	Tofant (SLO) W 4–0; Hassan (EGY) W 4–0; Martins (POR) W 4–0	1 Q	Yılmaz (TUR) W 4–0; Meshref (EGY) W 4–3; Colantoni (ITA) W 4–1	1 Q	Xiao (ESP); W 4–1	Dvorak (ESP); W 4–3	Meshref (EGY); L 1–4	2nd place, silver medalist(s)

== Tennis ==
Men

Athlete	Event	Round of 32	Round of 16	Quarterfinals	Semifinals	Final / BM	
Athlete	Event	Opposition Score	Opposition Score	Opposition Score	Opposition Score	Opposition Score	Rank
Lucas Catarina	Singles	Bye	Makhlouf (ALG); W 6–3, 5–7, 7–6	Saraiva (POR); W 6–2, 6–4	Ahouda (MAR); W 7–5, 6–1	Ouahab (MAR); L 2–6, 3–6	2nd place, silver medalist(s)

== Water skiing ==
Athlete	Event	Preliminary round			Final	
Athlete	Event	Round 1	Round 2	Rank	Points	Rank
Alexandre Marsan	Men's slalom	0.00/40	4.00/40	16	Did not advance	
