= Augusto Larrabure =

Peruvian sports shooter

Personal information
- Born: 17 February 1912
- Died: 15 October 1995 (aged 83)

Sport
- Sport: Sports shooting

Augusto Larrabure (17 February 1912 – 15 October 1995) was a Peruvian sports shooter. He competed in the 50 m rifle event at the 1948 Summer Olympics.
