= Justo Fernández =

Mexican sports shooter

Personal information
- Nationality: Mexican
- Born: 20 June 1941 (age 83)

Sport
- Sport: Sports shooting

Justo Fernández (born 20 June 1941) is a Mexican sports shooter. He competed in the mixed trap event at the 1976 Summer Olympics.
