= Gymnastics at the 1920 Summer Olympics – Men's artistic individual all-around =

Olympic gymnastics event

Men's artistic individual all-around at the Games of the VII Olympiad
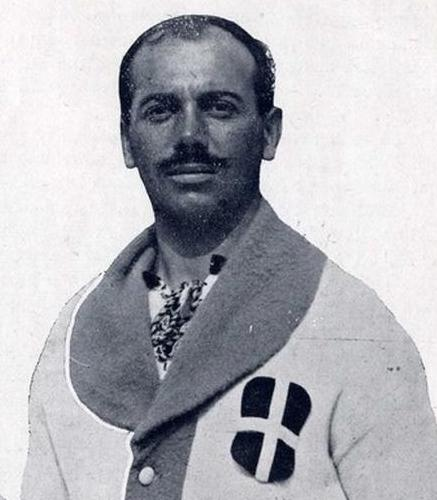
- Gold medalist Giorgio Zampori
- Venue: Olympisch Stadion, Antwerp
- Date: 25 August 1920
- Competitors: 25 from 7 nations
- Winning score: 88.35

Medalists
1st place, gold medalist(s)		Giorgio Zampori; Italy
2nd place, silver medalist(s)		Marco Torrès; France
3rd place, bronze medalist(s)		Jean Gounot; France

The men's artistic individual all-around was an artistic gymnastics event held as part of the gymnastics at the 1920 Summer Olympics programme. It was the fifth appearance of the event. The competition was held on Wednesday, 25 August 1920. 25 gymnasts from seven nations competed. Nations had been limited to 6 gymnasts each since 1912. The event was won by Giorgio Zampori of Italy, the nation's third consecutive victory in the men's individual all-around. France's Marco Torrès took silver and Jean Gounot earned bronze, stretching the French podium streak to three Games as well.

The gymnastics programme in 1920, just as in 1912, featured an individual all-around and three different team events. The individual all-around scores were not used for the team events. No separate apparatus competitions were held.

== Background ==
This was the fifth appearance of the men's individual all-around. The first individual all-around competition had been held in 1900, after the 1896 competitions featured only individual apparatus events. A men's individual all-around has been held every Games since 1900.

Two of the top 10 gymnasts from the pre-war 1912 Games returned: fourth-place finisher Giorgio Zampori of Italy and seventh-place finisher Marco Torrès of France. Torrès was the favorite and reigning World Champion, having won in 1913 (as well as previously in 1909); no major gymnastics events had been held since World War I (the 1919 Inter-Allied Games did not include the sport).

Egypt and Monaco each made their debut in the event. France and Italy each made their fourth appearance, tied for most among nations, both having missed only the 1904 Games in St. Louis.

== Competition format ==
The format for the all-around competition varied widely at early Games. The 1920 competition added a floor exercise, bringing the number of apparati used to 5 (floor, rings, parallel bars, horizontal bar, and pommel horse). A total of 8 exercises were performed by each gymnast, with a compulsory and an optional exercise in each of the parallel bars, horizontal bar, and rings as well as optional exercises on the floor and pommel horse. The 12-point scale from 1912 was modified to a 10-point scale with a 2-point addition for finishing the exercise, so the total score possible for the exercise remained 12. (Unlike 1912, the gymnast received a single score of up to 12 for each exercise rather than 3 separate judges' scores for a total of up to 36 for each exercise.) With eight exercises, the maximum score was 96.

== Schedule ==
Date	Time	Round
Thursday, 26 August 1920	15:00	Final

== Results ==
Rank	Gymnast	Nation	Score
1st place, gold medalist(s)	Giorgio Zampori	Italy	88.35
2nd place, silver medalist(s)	Marco Torrès	France	87.62
3rd place, bronze medalist(s)	Jean Gounot	France	87.45
4	Félicien Kempeneers	Belgium	86.25
5	Georges Thurnherr	France	86.00
6	Laurent Grech	France	85.65
7	Luigi Maiocco	Italy	85.38
8	Luigi Costigliolo	Italy	84.90
9	Julianus Wagemans	Belgium	83.58
10	Frank Kriz	United States	83.10
11	François Gibens	Belgium	83.08
12	Michel Porasso	Monaco	81.40
13	Louis-Charles Marty	France	81.15
14	Petter Hol	Norway	80.75
15	François Walker	France	80.55
16	Angelo Zorzi	Italy	80.51
17	François Verboven	Belgium	80.42
18	Vittorio Lucchetti	Italy	80.12
19	Charles Lannie	Belgium	78.95
20	Paul Krempel	United States	78.00
21	Bjørne Jorgensen	United States	76.71
22	Joseph Crovetto	Monaco	74.10
23	John Mais	United States	74.10
24	Kabil Mahmoud	Egypt	63.30
25	Ahmed Amin Tabouzada	Egypt	51.85

== Sources ==
- Belgium Olympic Committee (1957). Olympic Games Antwerp 1920: Official Report (in French).
- Wudarski, Pawel (1999). "Wyniki Igrzysk Olimpijskich" (in Polish).
