= Wilfredo Coto =

Cuban sports shooter

Personal information
- Born: 12 October 1917 Havana, Cuba
- Died: 1 December 1993 (aged 76) West Palm Beach, Florida, United States

Sport
- Sport: Sports shooting

Wilfredo Coto (12 October 1917 – 1 December 1993) was a Cuban sports shooter. He competed in the 50 m rifle event at the 1948 Summer Olympics.
