= Louis-Charles Marty =

French artistic gymnast

- Born: 30 December 1891 Cette, France
- Died: 19 March 1970 (aged 78)

Gymnastics career
- Discipline: Men's artistic gymnastics
- Country represented: France
Medal record
Men's artistic gymnastics
Representing France
World Championships
Bronze medal – third place	1922 Ljubljana	Team

Louis-Charles Marty (December 30, 1891 – March 19, 1970) was a French gymnast who competed in the 1912 Summer Olympics and in the 1920 Summer Olympics.

In 1912, he finished eleventh in the all-around competition. Eight years later, he finished thirteenth in the all-around competition.
