= Jacques Colon =

Belgian sports shooter (born 1944)

Personal information
- Nationality: Belgian
- Born: 15 September 1944 (age 81) Tihange, Belgium

Sport
- Sport: Sports shooting

Jacques Colon (born 15 September 1944) is a Belgian sports shooter. He competed in the mixed trap event at the 1976 Summer Olympics.
