= John Chandler (sport shooter) =

British sports shooter

Personal information
- Born: 27 June 1924
- Died: 13 July 2016 (aged 92)

Sport
- Sport: Sports shooting

John Chandler (27 June 1924 – 13 July 2016) was a British sports shooter. He competed in the 50 m rifle event at the 1948 Summer Olympics. In November 2016 it was reported that Chandler had died aged 92.
