= Ghabel =

Ghabel is a surname. It may refer to:

- Ahmad Ghabel (1954–2012), Iranian Hojjatoleslam Shia Muslim cleric, theologian, seminary lecturer, researcher, and author.
- Hadi Ghabel (born ?), Iranian Islamic cleric, activist, and political prisoner

== See also ==
- Kabil (disambiguation), related name
- Qabil (disambiguation), related name
