= Luigi Adami =

Italian sports shooter (1900–1985)

Personal information
- Born: 12 December 1900 Bologna, Kingdom of Italy
- Died: 4 July 1985 (aged 84) Treviso, Italy

Sport
- Sport: Sports shooting

Luigi Adami (12 December 1900 – 4 July 1985) was an Italian sports shooter. He competed in the 50 m rifle event at the 1948 Summer Olympics.
