= Albert Ravila =

Finnish sports shooter

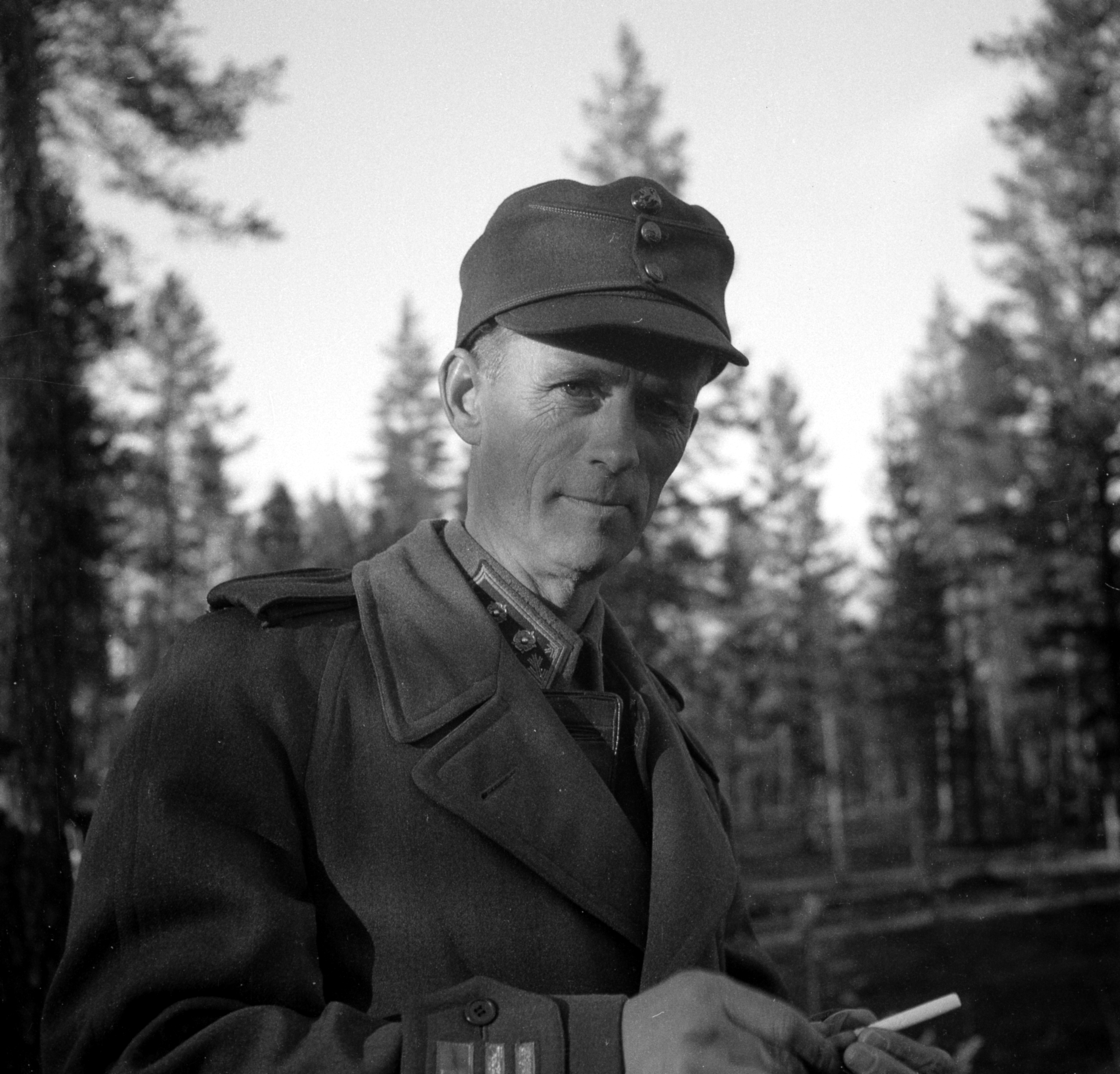
- Ravila in 1943.

Personal information
- Full name: Johan Albert Ravila
- Born: 28 December 1897 Helsinki, Finland
- Died: 28 June 1980 (aged 82) Helsinki, Finland

Sport
- Sport: Sports shooting

Johan Albert Ravila (28 December 1897 – 28 June 1980) was a Finnish sports shooter and a military officer. He finished in seventh place in the 50 m rifle event at the 1948 Summer Olympics.
