= Hugo Dufey =

Chilean sports shooter

Personal information
- Nationality: Chilean
- Born: 21 January 1938 (age 87)

Sport
- Sport: Sports shooting

Hugo Dufey (born 21 June 1938) is a Chilean sports shooter. He competed in the mixed trap event at the 1976 Summer Olympics.
