= Monaco at the 2009 Mediterranean Games =

- IOC code: MON
- NOC: Comité Olympique Monégasque

in Pescara
- Medals Ranked 20th: Gold 0 Silver 1 Bronze 0 Total 1

Mediterranean Games appearances (overview)
- 1955; 1959; 1963; 1967–1971; 1975; 1979; 1983; 1987; 1991; 1993; 1997; 2001; 2005; 2009; 2013; 2018; 2022

Monaco competed at the 2009 Mediterranean Games held in Pescara, Italy.

== Rowing ==
Men

Athletes	Events	Heat		Repechage		Final	
Athletes	Events	Time	Rank	Time	Rank	Time	Rank
Matthias Raymond	Double Sculls	7:29.10	6 Q→FA				
