= Leo Dove =

Australian sports shooter

Personal information
- Born: 24 August 1903 Burnley, Victoria, Australia
- Died: 14 December 1986 (aged 83) Murwillumbah, New South Wales, Australia

Sport
- Sport: Sports shooting

Leo Dove (24 August 1903 – 14 December 1986) was an Australian sports shooter. He competed in the 50 m rifle event at the 1948 Summer Olympics.
