= Cristóbal Tauler =

Spanish sports shooter (1894–1955)

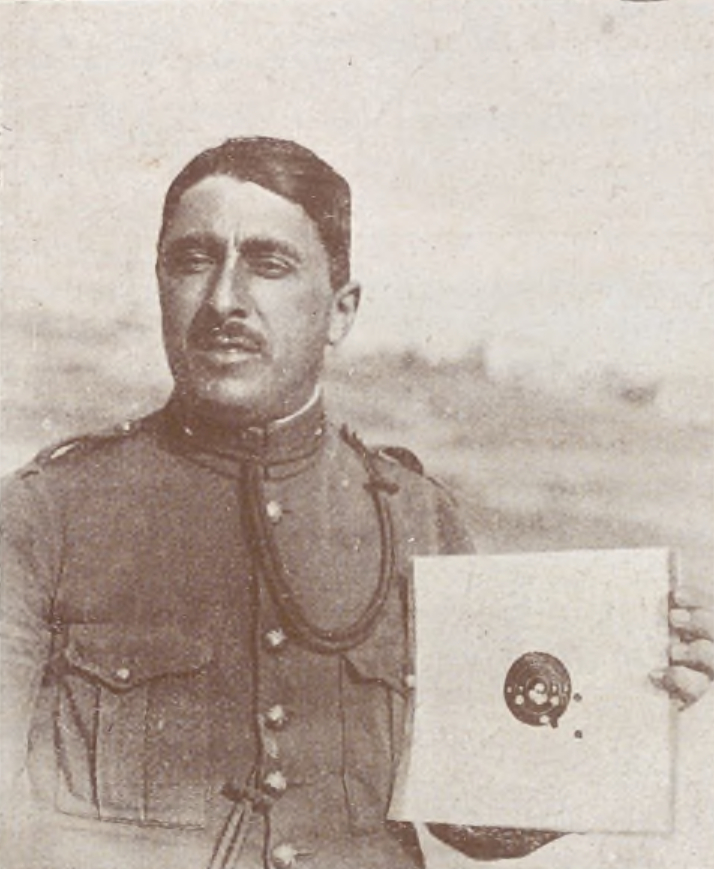

Personal information
- Born: 19 October 1894 Besalú, Spain
- Died: 25 March 1955 (aged 60) Madrid, Spain

Sport
- Sport: Sports shooting

Cristóbal Tauler (19 October 1894 – 25 March 1955) was a Spanish sports shooter. He competed in the 50 m rifle event at the 1948 Summer Olympics. Tauler died in Madrid on 25 March 1955, at the age of 60.

He was the first Mallorcan to win the title of World Champion, in this case in the discipline of Olympic Shooting. Although born in Palma de Mallorca (Spain) in 1893, Cristóbal Tauler Alós, a police inspector by profession, spent part of his life in Felanitx, where he married.

In 1918, 1919, and 1920, he was the Mallorca Champion in rifle shooting at 200 meters and in short-barreled military firearms at 30 and 25 meters, respectively. A General Inspector of Police and Weapons Instructor at the Madrid Police Academy, in 1921 he earned the title of National Master Shooter in rifle shooting at 200 meters and the Diploma of First Category Shooter in short-barreled military firearms at 25 meters. The following year, he was proclaimed Spanish Champion in speed shooting with a short-barreled military firearm at 25 meters in Santander.

In 1923, he again became Spanish Champion in the 50-meter free-range rifle event and won the individual gold medal in the international team shooting competition for military teams from Spain, France, Italy, and Portugal. In 1924, he participated in the Paris Olympics. At the 1927 World Championships in Rome, Italy, he won the team bronze medal in the 300-meter free-range rifle event.

In 1928, he participated in the Amsterdam Olympics and achieved fifth place in the team competition. 1929 would be his best year, as he became Spanish Champion and subsequently World Champion in the 300-meter free-range rifle event in Stockholm, Sweden. In 1933, he again became Spanish Champion in the 200-meter rifle event and runner-up in the World Championships of Olympic Shooting held in Granada. In 1948, he participated in the London Olympics.
