= Richard Bohslavsky =

Austrian sports shooter (1902–1984)

Personal information
- Born: 19 April 1904 Obervellach, Austria-Hungary
- Died: 22 May 1984 (aged 80) Zirl, Austria

Sport
- Sport: Sports shooting

Richard Bohslavsky (19 July 1904 – 22 May 1984) was an Austrian sports shooter. He competed in the 50 m rifle event at the 1948 Summer Olympics.
