= Bjørne Jorgensen =

American gymnast (1893–1934)

- Alternative name: Barney Jorgensen
- Born: December 16, 1893 Asker, Norway
- Died: June 22, 1934 (aged 40) Brooklyn, New York, U.S.
- Height: 170 cm (5 ft 7 in)

Gymnastics career
- Discipline: Men's artistic gymnastics
- Country represented: United States
- Gym: Norwegian Turnverein

Bjørne "Barney" Jorgensen (December 16, 1893 – June 22, 1934) was an American gymnast. He was a member of the United States men's national artistic gymnastics team and competed in the men's artistic individual all-around event at the 1920 Summer Olympics.

As a gymnast, Jorgensen was a member of Norwegian Turnverein and Athletic Club in Brooklyn, New York City.
