= Claude Platt =

Australian sports shooter

Personal information
- Born: 3 March 1904 Sunny Corner, New South Wales, Australia
- Died: 13 October 1966 (aged 62) Sydney, Australia

Sport
- Sport: Sports shooting

Claude Platt (3 March 1904 – 13 October 1966) was an Australian sports shooter. He competed in the 50 m rifle event at the 1948 Summer Olympics in England.
