= Walter Tomsen =

American sport shooter

Personal information
- Born: March 4, 1912 Kiev, Russian Empire
- Died: December 30, 2000 (aged 88) Southbury, Connecticut

Sport
- Sport: Sport shooting
Medal record
Men's shooting
Representing United States
Olympic Games
Silver medal – second place	1948 London	50 metre rifle

Walter Tomsen (March 4, 1912 – December 30, 2000) was a sport shooter and Olympic medalist for the United States. He won a silver medal in the 50 metre rifle prone event at the 1948 Summer Olympics in London.
