= Donald Haldeman =

American sport shooter

Personal information
- Born: 29 May 1947 Souderton, Pennsylvania, United States
- Died: 22 February 2003 (aged 55) Harleysville, Pennsylvania, United States

Sport
- Sport: Sport shooting
Medal record
Men's shooting
Representing United States
Olympic Games
Gold medal – first place	1976 Montreal	Trap shooting

Donald Stanley Haldeman (May 29, 1947 – February 22, 2003) was an American sport shooter from Souderton, Pennsylvania. He competed and won a gold medal in the 1976 Summer Olympics, the third American shooter to win Olympic gold in Trapshooting. He served in the United States Army during the Vietnam War era.
