= Mediterranean Sports Palace =

Arena in Almería, Spain

Mediterranean Sports Palace (Spanish: Palacio de Deportes Mediterráneo) is an arena in Almería, Spain. It is primarily used for indoor sports and was one of the main venues for the 2005 Mediterranean Games. The arena holds 5,000 people and was opened in 2004. The arena is the regular home venue of CV Almería volleyball team.
