= Ernst Wöll =

Austrian sports shooter

Personal information
- Born: 3 February 1907 Brixlegg, Austria-Hungary

Sport
- Sport: Sports shooting

Ernst Wöll (born 3 February 1907, date of death unknown) was an Austrian sports shooter. He competed in the 50 m rifle event at the 1948 Summer Olympics.
