= Mohammad Ali Alijani =

Iranian sports shooter (born 1951)

Personal information
- Full name: Mohammad Ali Alijani Momer
- Nationality: Iranian
- Born: 26 February 1951 (age 74)

Sport
- Sport: Sports shooting

Mohammad Ali Alijani Momer (Persian: محمدعلی علی‌جانی مومر, born 26 February 1951) is an Iranian sports shooter. He competed in the mixed trap event at the 1976 Summer Olympics.
