= George Jones (sport shooter) =

British sports shooter

Personal information
- Full name: George A. J. Jones

Sport
- Sport: Sports shooting

George A. J. Jones was a British sports shooter. He competed in the 50 m rifle event at the 1948 Summer Olympics.
