= Julio Nolasco =

Argentine sports shooter

Personal information
- Born: c. 1914

Sport
- Sport: Sports shooting

Julio Nolasco (born c. 1914, date of death unknown) was an Argentine sports shooter. He competed in the 50 m rifle event at the 1948 Summer Olympics.
