= San Marino at the 2005 Mediterranean Games =

San Marino at the 1951 Mediterranean Games
- IOC code: SMR
- NOC: Comitato Olimpico Nazionale Sammarinese

in Alexandria
- Medals Ranked 18th: Gold 0 Silver 1 Bronze 0 Total 1

Mediterranean Games appearances (overview)
- 1987; 1991; 1993; 1997; 2001; 2005; 2009; 2013; 2018; 2022

San Marino (SMR) competed at the 2005 Mediterranean Games in Almería, Spain. The nation had a total number of 33 participants (28 men and 5 women).

== Medal ==
=== Silver ===
Shooting

- Women's Trap: Daniela Del Din

== Results by event ==
Beach Volleyball

- Men's Competition

- Alfredo Tabarini and Francesco Tabarini

Bowls

- Men's doubles

- Fernando Chiaruzzi
- Alfredo Mazza

- Men's Triples

- Corrado Albani
- Fernando Chiaruzzi
- Alfredo Mazza

Equestrian

- Individual Jumping

- Tommaso Lonfernini

Golf

- Men's Individual

- Fabio Grossi

Shooting

- Men's 10m Air Pistol

- Mirko Bugli

- Men's 50m Rifle Prone

- Federico Volpini

- Men's Skeet

- Moreno Benedettini

- Men's Trap

- Francesco Amici
- Alfio Tomassoni

- Men's Double Trap

- Maurizio Zonzini

- Women's 10m Air Pistol

- Nadia Marchi

- Women's 10m Air Rifle

- Erika Ghiotti

- Women's Trap

- Daniela Del Din
- Emanuela Felici

Swimming

- Men's 100m Freestyle

- Emanuele Nicolini

- Men's 200m Freestyle

- Emanuele Nicolini

- Men's 400m Freestyle

- Emanuele Nicolini

- Men's 1500m Freestyle

- Emanuele Nicolini

- Men's 200m Butterfly

- Emanuele Nicolini

- Women's 100m Freestyle

- Simona Muccioli

- Women's 400m Freestyle

- Simona Muccioli

- Women's 800m Freestyle

- Simona Muccioli

- Women's 200m Butterfly

- Simona Muccioli

Tennis

- Men's singles

- William Forcellini
- Domenico Vicini

- Men's doubles

- William Forcellini and Domenico Vicini

Volleyball

- Men's Team Competition

- Luca de Luigi
- Alessandro Della Balda
- Leonardo Gennari
- Simone Giorgetti
- Valerio Guagnelli
- Elia Lazzarini
- Enrico Morganti
- Davide Righi
- Ivan Stefanelli
- Francesco Tabarini
- Davide Tini
- Lino Zonzini

== See also ==
- San Marino at the 2004 Summer Olympics
- San Marino at the 2008 Summer Olympics
