= Ilias Valatas =

Greek sports shooter (1915–1994)

Personal information
- Born: 1915
- Died: 1994 (aged 78–79)

Sport
- Sport: Sports shooting

Ilias Valatas (1915–1994) was a Greek sports shooter. He competed in the 50 m rifle event at the 1948 Summer Olympics.
