= Børge Christensen (sport shooter) =

Danish sports shooter (1912–1967)

Personal information
- Born: 18 May 1912 Copenhagen, Denmark
- Died: 4 August 1967 (aged 55) Gentofte, Denmark

Sport
- Sport: Sports shooting

Børge Christensen (18 May 1912 – 4 August 1967) was a Danish sports shooter. He competed in the 50 m rifle event at the 1948 Summer Olympics.
