= Eduardo Echeverría (sport shooter) =

Guatemalan sports shooter

Personal information
- Nationality: Guatemalan
- Born: 23 June 1939 (age 85)

Sport
- Sport: Sports shooting

Eduardo Echeverría (born 23 June 1939) is a Guatemalan sports shooter. He competed in the mixed trap event at the 1976 Summer Olympics.
