= San Marino at the 2009 Mediterranean Games =

- IOC code: SMR
- NOC: Comitato Olimpico Nazionale Sammarinese

in Pescara
- Medals Ranked 17th: Gold 1 Silver 3 Bronze 2 Total 6

Mediterranean Games appearances (overview)
- 1987; 1991; 1993; 1997; 2001; 2005; 2009; 2013; 2018; 2022

San Marino competed at the 2009 Mediterranean Games held in Pescara, Italy. It won 1 gold, 3 silver and 2 bronze medals.

== Rhythmic ==
Athlete	Event	Qualification						Final					
Athlete	Event	Rope	Hoop	Ball	Ribbon	Total	Rank	Rope	Hoop	Ball	Ribbon	Total	Rank
Giada Della Valle	Individual	19.700	20.200	18.025	16.850	74.775	17	Did not advance					17
