= Jacques Delval =

Sports shooter

Personal information
- Born: 1 April 1908 Uccle, Belgium

Sport
- Sport: Sports shooting

Jacques Delval (born 1 April 1908, date of death unknown) was a Belgian sports shooter. He competed in the 50 m rifle event at the 1948 Summer Olympics.
