= György Gruber =

Hungarian sports shooter

Personal information
- Nationality: Hungarian
- Born: 11 July 1954; Veszprém, Hungary
- Died: 1 July 2009 (aged 54)

Sport
- Sport: Sports shooting

György Gruber (11 July 1954 – 1 July 2009) was a Hungarian sports shooter. He competed in the mixed trap event at the 1976 Summer Olympics.
