= José de la Torre (sport shooter) =

Mexican sports shooter

Personal information
- Born: 3 April 1913 Acatic, Mexico

Sport
- Sport: Sports shooting

José de la Torre (born 3 April 1913, date of death unknown) was a Mexican sports shooter. He competed in the 50 m rifle event at the 1948 Summer Olympics.
