= Malcolm Jenkins (sport shooter) =

British sports shooter

Personal information
- Nationality: British
- Born: 27 December 1944 (age 80)

Sport
- Sport: Sports shooting

Malcolm Jenkins (born 27 December 1944) is a British former sports shooter. He competed in the mixed trap event at the 1976 Summer Olympics.
