= George Johnson (sport shooter) =

Puerto Rican sports shooter

Personal information
- Born: 6 June 1915 Santurce, Puerto Rico
- Died: 27 June 2006 (aged 91) San Juan, Puerto Rico

Sport
- Sport: Sports shooting

George Johnson (6 June 1915 – 27 June 2006) was a Puerto Rican sports shooter. He competed in the 50 m rifle event at the 1948 Summer Olympics.
