= Peter Wray =

Australian sports shooter (born 1937)

Personal information
- Nationality: Australian
- Born: 16 October 1937 (age 88)
- Height: 183 cm (6 ft 0 in)
- Weight: 86 kg (190 lb)

Sport
- Sport: Sports shooting

Peter Wray (born 16 October 1937) is an Australian sports shooter. He competed in the mixed trap event at the 1976 Summer Olympics.
