= Orlando Santamaría =

Cuban sports shooter

Personal information
- Born: 29 May 1920
- Died: 9 September 1992 (aged 72) Miami, Florida, United States

Sport
- Sport: Sports shooting

Orlando Santamaría (29 May 1920 – 9 September 1992) was a Cuban sports shooter. He competed in the 50 m rifle event at the 1948 Summer Olympics.
