= Houshang Ghazvini =

Iranian sports shooter

Personal information
- Nationality: Iranian
- Born: 7 January 1938 (age 87); Kerman, Iran

Sport
- Sport: Sports shooting

Houshang Ghazvini (Persian: هوشنگ قزوینی, born 7 January 1938) is an Iranian sports shooter. He competed in the mixed trap event at the 1976 Summer Olympics.
