= João de Faria =

Brazilian sports shooter

Carlos de Faria
Personal information
- Full name: João Carlos Pinto de Faria
- Born: 31 August 1912 Rio de Janeiro, Brazil

Sport
- Sport: Sports shooting

Carlos de Faria (born 31 August 1912, date of death unknown) was a Brazilian sports shooter. He competed in the 50 m rifle event at the 1948 Summer Olympics.
