= Victor Gilbert =

British sports shooter

Personal information
- Born: 27 May 1905 Bolton, England
- Died: 6 December 1978 (aged 73)

Sport
- Sport: Sports shooting

Victor Gilbert (27 May 1905 – 6 December 1978) was a British sports shooter. He competed in the 50 m rifle event at the 1948 Summer Olympics.
