= Frank Oh =

Singaporean sports shooter (born 1946)

Personal information
- Nationality: Singaporean
- Born: 26 August 1946 (age 78)

Sport
- Sport: Sports shooting

Frank Oh Hock Chu (born 26 August 1946) is a Singaporean former sports shooter. He competed in the mixed trap event at the 1976 Summer Olympics.
