= Dick Flynn (Australian footballer) =

Australian rules footballer

Personal information
- Full name: Richard Charles Flynn
- Born: 2 November 1926; Broken Hill, New South Wales
- Died: 25 July 1949 (aged 22); Parkville, Victoria
- Height: 179 cm (5 ft 10 in)
- Weight: 81 kg (179 lb)

Playing career^{1}
Years	Club	Games (Goals)
1946	North Melbourne	1 (0)
- ^{1} Playing statistics correct to the end of 1946.

Richard Charles Flynn (2 November 1926 – 25 July 1949) was an Australian rules footballer who played with North Melbourne in the Victorian Football League (VFL). He was born in Broken Hill and died in Parkville.

His only senior appearance for North Melbourne came in the opening round of the 1946 VFL season, a 59-point win over St Kilda at Arden Street Oval. He was initially named as an emergency, but came into the team when Kevin Dynon pulled out with an injury.

Flynn was badly injured on 20 July 1949 when he crashed his car into the back of a truck. He died five days later in Royal Melbourne Hospital.
