= Stéphane Operto =

Monegasque cyclist (born 1966)

Personal information
- Born: 25 November 1966 (age 59)

Cycling career
- Sport: Cycling

Stéphane Operto (born 25 November 1966) is a Monegasque former cyclist. He competed in the road race at the 1988 Summer Olympics.
