= Patrick Novaretti =

Monegasque swimmer (born 1957)

Personal information
- Born: 5 April 1957 (age 69)

Sport
- Sport: Swimming

Patrick Novaretti (born 5 April 1957) is a Monegasque former swimmer. He competed in three events at the 1976 Summer Olympics.
