= Richard Flynn (sport shooter) =

Irish sports shooter (1933–2025)

Personal information
- Nationality: Irish
- Born: 13 May 1933
- Died: 19 December 2025 (aged 92) Dublin, Republic of Ireland

Sport
- Sport: Sports shooting

Richard Flynn (13 May 1933 – 19 December 2025) was an Irish sports shooter. He competed in the mixed trap event at the 1976 Summer Olympics.

Flynn died on 19 December 2025, at the age of 92.
