= Ubaldesco Baldi =

Italian sport shooter

Olympic medal record

Shooting

Representing Italy
Bronze medal – third place	1976 Montreal	Trap

Ubaldesco Baldi (13 July 1944 – 13 June 1991) was an Italian sport shooter who competed in the 1976 Summer Olympics, winning a bronze medal in the Mixed Trap event.
