= Oscar Lozano (sport shooter) =

Mexican sports shooter

Óscar Lozano
Personal information
- Full name: Óscar Lozano Soto
- Born: 29 September 1928 Monterrey, Mexico

Sport
- Sport: Sports shooting

Óscar Lozano (born 29 September 1928) is a Mexican former sports shooter. He competed in the 50 m rifle event at the 1948 Summer Olympics.
