= Kabil Mahmoud =

Egyptian gymnast

- قابيل محمود

Gymnastics career
- Discipline: Men's artistic gymnastics
- Country represented: Egypt

Kabil Mahmoud was an Egyptian gymnast. He competed in the men's artistic individual all-around event at the 1920 Summer Olympics.
