= Hervé Banti =

Monegasque triathlete (born 1977)

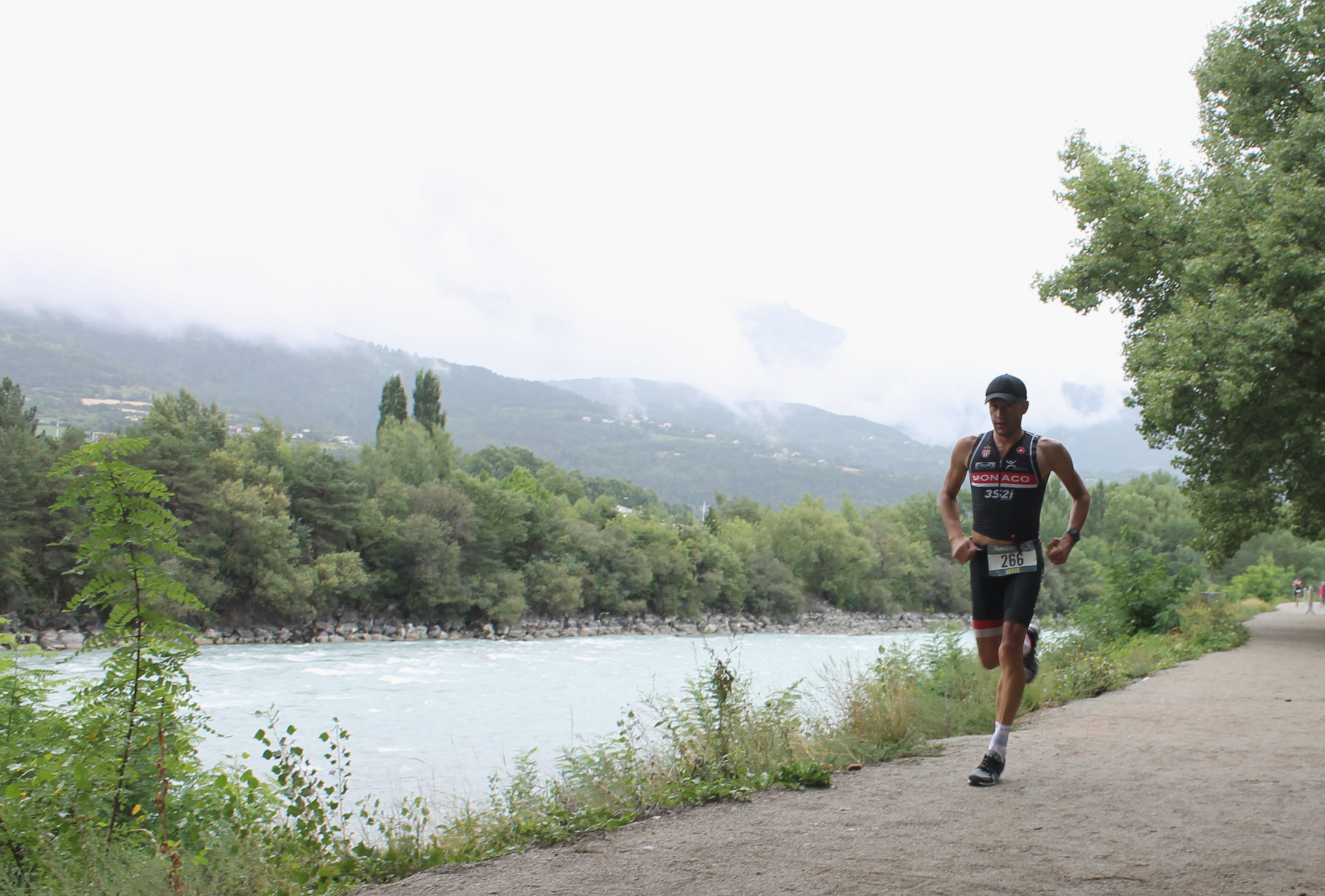

Personal information
- Nationality: Monégasque
- Born: March 26, 1977 (age 49) Ollioules, France
- Height: 1.80 m (5 ft 11 in)
- Weight: 71 kg (157 lb)

Sport
- Country: Monaco
- Sport: Triathlon

Hervé Banti (born March 26, 1977) is a Monégasque-national Olympic triathlete, who competes on pro team AS Monaco Triathlon. Banti competed in the 2012 Summer Olympics Men's Triathlon, placing 49th overall.

== Olympic results ==
Athlete	Event	Swim (1.5 km)	Trans 1	Bike (40 km)	Trans 2	Run (10 km)	Total	Rank
Hervé Banti	Men's	18:55	0:40	58:51	0:32	33:44	1:52:42	49
