= Jean-Luc Adorno =

Monegasque swimmer (born 1961)

Personal information
- Born: 30 June 1961 (age 65)

Sport
- Sport: Swimming

Jean-Luc Adorno (born 30 June 1961) is a Monegasque swimmer. He competed in the men's 100 metre freestyle at the 1984 Summer Olympics.
