= Armando Marques (sport shooter) =

Portuguese sports shooter

Personal information
- Full name: Armando da Silva Marques
- Born: 1 May 1937 (age 89) Lisbon, Portugal

Sport
- Sport: Sports shooting
Medal record
Men's shooting
Representing Portugal
Olympic Games
Silver medal – second place	1976 Montreal	Trap

Armando da Silva Marques, CvIH (born 1 May 1937) is a Portuguese sports shooter. He competed at the 1964, 1972 and 1976 Summer Olympics. In the mixed trap event at the 1976 Olympics, he won a silver medal.
