= Maulawi Qabil =

- Arrested: 2009-06-13
- Detained at: Bagram
- Other name
- ISN: 4065

On January 15, 2010, the U.S. Department of Defense published a list of Detainees held in the Bagram Theater Internment Facility that included the name Maulawi Qabil.

According to historian Andy Worthington, author of The Guantanamo Files and the Afghanistan Times he was captured on June 13, 2009, Konar Province.

Maulawi Qabil, a Salafist commander in Konar province was captured June 13. Qabil led multiple attacks against coalition and ANSF forces and transported IEDs within the province.

No further information is known about this individual.
