= Esteban Azcue =

Spanish sports shooter

Personal information
- Nationality: Spanish
- Born: 24 February 1944 (age 81)

Sport
- Sport: Sports shooting

Esteban Azcue (born 24 February 1944) is a Spanish sports shooter. He competed in the mixed trap event at the 1976 Summer Olympics.
