= Veijo Kaakinen =

Finnish sport shooter

Personal information
- Born: 10 December 1907 Oulu, Finland
- Died: 19 November 1976 (aged 68) Lempäälä, Finland

Sport
- Sport: Sports shooting

Veijo Kaakinen (10 December 1907 – 19 November 1976) was a Finnish sports shooter. He competed in the 50 m rifle event at the 1948 Summer Olympics.
