= Monaco at the Olympics =

- IOC code: MON
- NOC: Comité Olympique Monégasque
- Website: www.comite-olympique.mc (in French)
- Medals: Gold 0 Silver 0 Bronze 0 Total 0

Summer appearances
- 1920; 1924; 1928; 1932; 1936; 1948; 1952; 1956; 1960; 1964; 1968; 1972; 1976; 1980; 1984; 1988; 1992; 1996; 2000; 2004; 2008; 2012; 2016; 2020; 2024; 2028

Winter appearances
- 1984; 1988; 1992; 1994; 1998; 2002; 2006; 2010; 2014; 2018; 2022; 2026

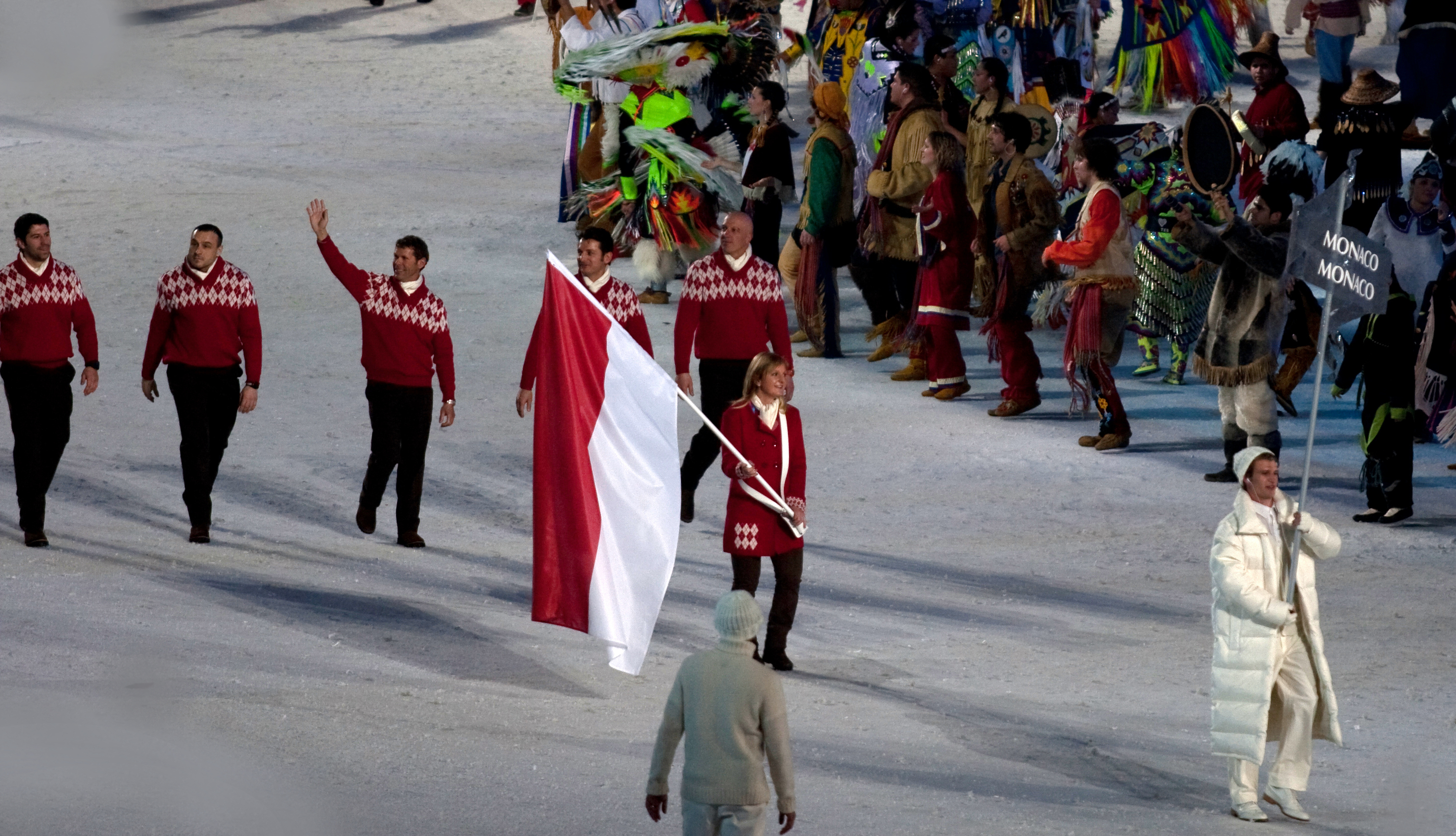
Monaco team with flag at the 2010 Winter Olympics opening ceremony

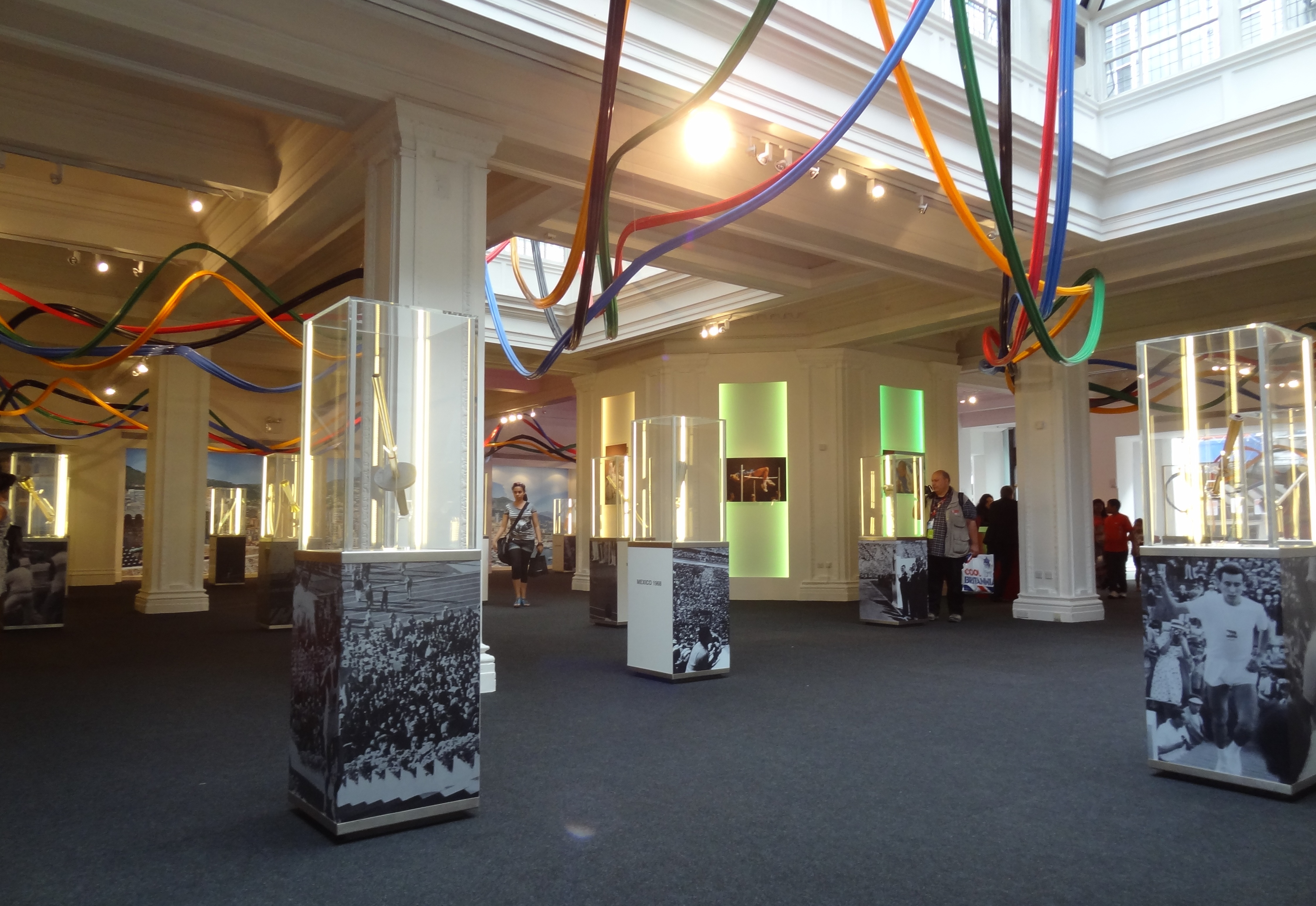
House of Monaco at the 2012 London Olympics

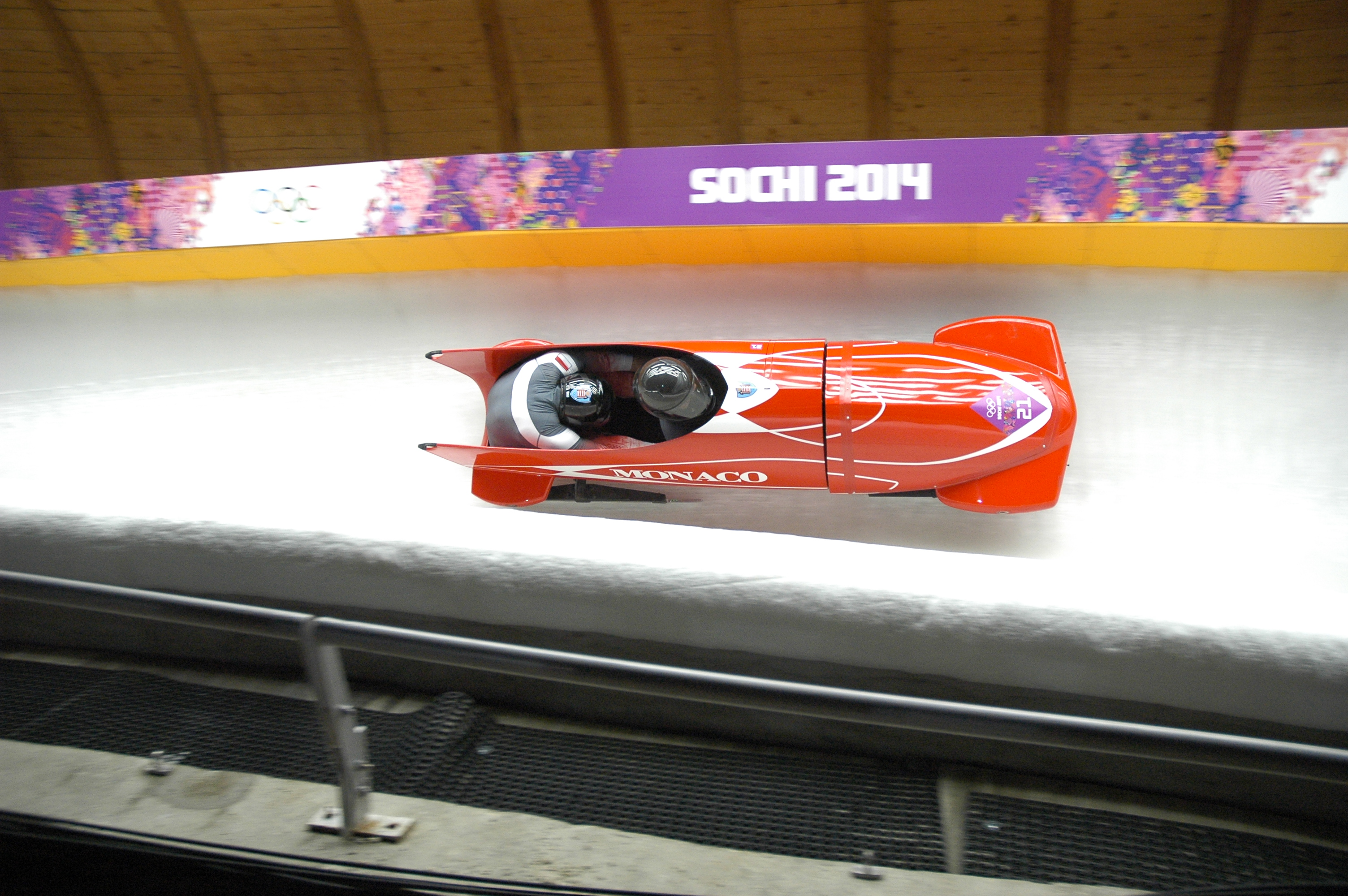
Monaco at the 2014 Winter Olympics, two-man bobsled

Monaco first participated at the Olympic Games in 1920, and has sent athletes to compete in most Summer Olympic Games since then, missing only the 1932 Games in Los Angeles, United States, the 1956 Games in Melbourne, Australia, and the boycotted 1980 Moscow Games. Monaco has also participated in every Winter Olympic Games since 1984.

As of 2024, no athlete from Monaco has ever won an Olympic medal in Summer nor Winter Games, meaning the principality has the most appearances at the Olympics (33, including 22 summer and 11 winter) without ever making it to the podium (Julien Médecin did win a bronze medal for architecture at the 1924 Olympics, but the IOC no longer considers art competition medals as part of the official tally). Its best-ever finish has been sixth place in two-man bobsleigh at the 2022 Winter Olympics.

The National Olympic Committee for Monaco was created in 1907, but not recognized by the International Olympic Committee until 1953.

== Former Bronze medal in 1924 Summer Games ==
Julien Médecin received a bronze medal for his design of the Stadium for Monte Carlo in Monaco at the 1924 Summer Olympics in Paris. The medals in art competitions are considered official medals by the IOC, but not as an olympic sport. Nevertheless, these medals are officially included in the country profiles and in the medal tables. However, most secondary sources only consider medals in sports competitions and list Monaco with zero medals.

== Medal tables ==
=== Medals by Summer Games ===
Games	Athletes	Gold	Silver	Bronze	Total	Rank
(Belgium) 1920 Antwerp	4	0	0	0	0	–
(France) 1924 Paris	7	0	0	0	0	–
(Netherlands) 1928 Amsterdam	7	0	0	0	0	–
(United States) 1932 Los Angeles	did not participate					
(Germany) 1936 Berlin	8	0	0	0	0	–
(United Kingdom) 1948 London	4	0	0	0	0	–
(Finland) 1952 Helsinki	8	0	0	0	0	–
(Australia) 1956 Melbourne	did not participate					
(Italy) 1960 Rome	11	0	0	0	0	–
(Japan) 1964 Tokyo	1	0	0	0	0	–
1968 Mexico City	2	0	0	0	0	–
(Germany) 1972 Munich	5	0	0	0	0	–
(Canada) 1976 Montreal	8	0	0	0	0	–
(Soviet Union) 1980 Moscow	boycotted					
(United States) 1984 Los Angeles	8	0	0	0	0	–
(South Korea) 1988 Seoul	9	0	0	0	0	–
(Spain) 1992 Barcelona	2	0	0	0	0	–
(United States) 1996 Atlanta	3	0	0	0	0	–
(Australia) 2000 Sydney	4	0	0	0	0	–
(Greece) 2004 Athens	3	0	0	0	0	–
(China) 2008 Beijing	5	0	0	0	0	–
(United Kingdom) 2012 London	6	0	0	0	0	–
(Brazil) 2016 Rio de Janeiro	3	0	0	0	0	–
(Japan) 2020 Tokyo	6	0	0	0	0	–
(France) 2024 Paris	7	0	0	0	0	–
(United States) 2028 Los Angeles	future event					
(Australia) 2032 Brisbane	future event					
Total		0	0	0	0	–

=== Medals by Winter Games ===
Games	Athletes	Gold	Silver	Bronze	Total	Rank
(Socialist Federal Republic of Yugoslavia) 1984 Sarajevo	1	0	0	0	0	–
(Canada) 1988 Calgary	3	0	0	0	0	–
(France) 1992 Albertville	5	0	0	0	0	–
(Norway) 1994 Lillehammer	5	0	0	0	0	–
(Japan) 1998 Nagano	4	0	0	0	0	–
(United States) 2002 Salt Lake City	5	0	0	0	0	–
(Italy) 2006 Turin	4	0	0	0	0	–
(Canada) 2010 Vancouver	3	0	0	0	0	–
(Russia) 2014 Sochi	5	0	0	0	0	–
(South Korea) 2018 Pyeongchang	4	0	0	0	0	–
(China) 2022 Beijing	3	0	0	0	0	–
(Italy) 2026 Milano Cortina	1	0	0	0	0	–
(France) 2030 French Alps	future event					
(United States) 2034 Utah	future event					
Total		0	0	0	0	–

== See also ==
- List of flag bearers for Monaco at the Olympics
- Category:Olympic competitors for Monaco
