= Pierre Boisson (sport shooter) =

Monegasque sport shooter (1930–2014)

Personal information
- Born: 8 June 1930
- Died: 13 August 2014 (aged 84) Monaco

Sport
- Sport: Sports shooting

Pierre Boisson (8 June 1930 – 13 August 2014) was a Monegasque sports shooter. He competed at the 1972, 1976 and the 1984 Summer Olympics. Boisson died in Monaco on 13 August 2014, at the age of 84.
