= Johnny Påhlsson =

Swedish sport shooter (1941–2009)

Personal information
- Born: 13 May 1941 Torsby, Sweden
- Died: 21 November 2009 (aged 68) Lakene, Sweden

Sport
- Sport: Sports shooting

Johnny Påhlsson (13 May 1941 – 21 November 2009) was a Swedish sport shooter who competed in the 1972 Summer Olympics, in the 1976 Summer Olympics, in the 1984 Summer Olympics, and in the 1988 Summer Olympics.
