= Gilles Cresto =

Monegasque archer (born 1959)

Personal information
- Nationality: Monegasque
- Born: 30 August 1959 (age 65)

Sport
- Sport: Archery

Gilles Cresto (born 30 August 1959) is a Monegasque archer. He competed at the 1984 Summer Olympics and the 1988 Summer Olympics.
