= 2005 Mediterranean Games =

15th edition of the Mediterranean Games

XV Mediterranean Games Almería 2005
- Host city: Almería, Spain
- Nations: 21
- Athletes: 3,203
- Events: 258 in 27 sports
- Opening: 24 June 2005
- Closing: 3 July 2005
- Opened by: Juan Carlos I
- Main venue: Mediterranean Stadium

The XVth Mediterranean Games Almería 2005 (XV Juegos del Mediterráneo 2005 in Spanish), commonly known as the 2005 Mediterranean Games, were the 15th Mediterranean Games. The Games were held in Almería, Spain over 10 days, from 24 June to 3 July 2005, where 3,203 athletes (2,126 men and 1,077 women) from 21 countries participated. There were a total of 258 medal events from 27 different sports.

== Nations ==
- Albania
- Algeria
- Bosnia and Herzegovina
- Croatia
- Cyprus
- Egypt
- France
- Greece
- Italy
- Lebanon
- Libya
- Malta
- Monaco
- Morocco
- San Marino
- Serbia and Montenegro
- Slovenia
- Spain
- Syria
- Tunisia
- Turkey

== Sports ==
- Archery
- Athletics
- Basketball
- Beach volleyball
- Bowls
- Boxing
- Canoeing
- Cycling
- Equestrian
- Fencing
- Football
- Golf
- Artistic gymnastics
- Rhythmic gymnastics
- Handball
- Judo
- Karate
- Rowing
- Sailing
- Shooting
- Swimming
- Table tennis
- Tennis
- Volleyball
- Water polo
- Weightlifting
- Wrestling

== Competitors ==
Nation	Men	Women	Total
Albania	35	23	58
Algeria	84	30	114
Bosnia and Herzegovina	41	7	49
Croatia	117	83	200
Cyprus	23	13	36
Egypt	113	24	137
France	213	155	368
Greece	207	134	341
Italy	241	156	397
Lebanon	16	4	20
Libya	34	0	34
Malta	26	3	29
Monaco	15	1	16
Morocco	110	32	142
San Marino	28	5	33
Serbia and Montenegro	108	45	153
Slovenia	98	61	159
Spain	289	174	463
Syria	28	2	30
Tunisia	99	25	124
Turkey	200	100	300
Total	2126	1077	3203

== Medal table ==
The rankings sort by the number of gold medals earned by a country. The number of silvers is taken into consideration next and then the number of bronze. Equal ranking is given and they are listed alphabetically if after the above, countries are still tied. This follows the system used by the IOC, IAAF and BBC.

* Host nation (Spain)

Rank	NOC	Gold	Silver	Bronze	Total
1	Italy (ITA)	57	40	56	153
2	France (FRA)	56	51	46	153
3	Spain (ESP)*	45	59	48	152
4	Turkey (TUR)	20	24	29	73
5	Egypt (EGY)	15	10	18	43
6	Greece (GRE)	13	15	31	59
7	Tunisia (TUN)	13	7	15	35
8	Slovenia (SLO)	10	8	17	35
9	Algeria (ALG)	9	5	11	25
10	Serbia and Montenegro (SCG)	8	9	14	31
11	Croatia (CRO)	5	10	11	26
12	Morocco (MAR)	3	6	3	12
13	Syria (SYR)	1	5	5	11
14	Cyprus (CYP)	1	4	2	7
15	Bosnia and Herzegovina (BIH)	1	2	3	6
16	Libya (LBA)	1	0	1	2
17	Albania (ALB)	0	2	4	6
18	San Marino (SMR)	0	1	0	1
19	Malta (MLT)	0	0	1	1
Totals (19 entries)		258	258	315	831

== Competition venues ==
Almería

- Mediterranean Stadium (Athletics, Handisports, Football)
- Mediterranean Sports Palace (Gymnastics, Volleyball)
- Las Almadrabillas Sports Centre (Swimming, Handisports, Water polo)
- "Moisés Ruiz" Sports Hall of the Diputación (Gymnastics, Volleyball)
- Mediterranean Village Golf Course (Golf)
- Almería Equestrian Club (Equestrian sports)
- "Rafael Florido" Sports Hall (Karate, Judo)
- "Emilio Campra" Youth Stadium (Archery)
- "Antonio Rivera" Youth Sports Hall (Weightlifting)
- Club de Mar (Sailing)
- Bullring (Bowls)
- El Palmeral Beach Volleyball Stadium (Beach Volleyball)
- Los Ángeles Sports Hall (Boxing)

Cuevas del Almanzora

- Cuevas del Almanzora Canal (Rowing, Canoe-Kayak)

El Ejido

- El Ejido Stadium (Football)
- El Ejido Sports Hall (Basketball)
- Las Norias Sports Hall (Volleyball)

Gádor

- Mediterranean Games Shooting Centre (Shooting)

Huércal de Almería

- Almería Tennis Club (Tennis)
- Huércal de Almería Sports Hall (Wrestling)

Roquetas de Mar

- "Antonio Peroles" Stadium (Football)
- "Infanta Cristina" Sports Hall (Handball)
- "Máximo Cuervo" Sports Hall (Table tennis, Fencing)

Vícar

- Vícar Stadium (Football)
- Vícar Sports Hall (Handball)

== Mascot ==
The mascot is a multicolored Indalo named Indalete, representing a figure holding an arch over its head. This figure was inspired by a Neolithic icon originating from Almeria, Spain.

== See also ==
- Mediterranean Games Athletic results at gbrathletics website
