= Émile Barral =

Monegasque Olympic sailor (1891–1961)

Personal information
- Nationality: Monegasque
- Born: 24 September 1891 Monaco
- Died: 5 April 1961 (aged 69) Monaco

Sailing career
- Sport: Sailing
- Class: French National Monotype 1924

Émile Louis Vincent Barral (24 September 1891 – 5 April 1961) was a sailor and runner from Monaco. As a sailor, he represented his country in the Monotype event at the 1924 Summer Olympics and the 12 foot dinghy event at the 1928 Summer Olympics. As a runner, he competed in the men's 800 metres at the 1920 Summer Olympics.

== Sources ==
- "Émile Barral Bio, Stats, and Results". Olympic Sports. Sports-Reference.com. Archived from the original on 18 April 2020.
- Les Jeux de la VIIIe Olympiade Paris 1924:rapport official (PDF) (in French). Paris: Librairie de France: Comité Olympique Français. 1924.
