= Gilbert Scorsoglio =

Monegasque sports shooter

Personal information
- Born: 21 July 1932 (age 93) Monaco

Sport
- Sport: Sports shooting

Gilbert Scorsoglio (born 21 July 1932) is a Monegasque former sports shooter. He competed at the 1960 Summer Olympics and the 1968 Summer Olympics.

Scorsoglio was also an amateur filmmaker and a real estate businessman.
