= Joseph Crovetto =

Monegasque gymnast (1889–1964)

- Full name: Joseph Marius Crovetto
- Born: 17 December 1889 Monaco City, Monaco
- Died: 27 March 1964 (aged 74) Monaco City, Monaco

Gymnastics career
- Discipline: Men's artistic gymnastics
- Country represented: Monaco

Joseph Marius Crovetto (17 December 1889 – 27 March 1964) was a Monegasque gymnast. He competed in the men's artistic individual all-around event at the 1920 Summer Olympics.
