= Damien Desprat =

Monegasque sailor (born 1974)

Personal information
- Full name: Damien Desprat-Lerale
- Nationality: Monégasque
- Born: September 14, 1974 (age 51)

Sport
- Country: Monaco
- Sport: Sailing

Damien Desprat (born September 14, 1974, in France) is a Monégasque Olympic sailor, who specializes in Lasers. He competed at the 2012 Summer Olympics in the Men's Laser class, finishing in 45th place in the heats, failing to qualify for the semifinals. Desprat was also Monaco's flag bearer during the Closing Ceremony.

== Olympic results ==
Athlete	Event	Race											Net points	Final rank
Athlete	Event	1	2	3	4	5	6	7	8	9	10	M	Net points	Final rank
Damien Desprat	Laser	44	45	45	39	41	43	42	32	45	25	EL	396	45
