= Paul Cerutti =

Monegasque sports shooter (1910–2000)

Personal information
- Born: 30 November 1910
- Died: 21 September 2000 (aged 89)

Sport
- Sport: Sports shooting

Paul Cerutti (30 November 1910 – 21 September 2000) was a Monegasque former sports shooter. He competed at the 1972 Summer Olympics and the 1976 Summer Olympics.
