= Francis Boisson =

Monegasque sports shooter (1928–2021)

Personal information
- Born: 22 January 1928 Monaco
- Died: 23 December 2021 (aged 93)

Sport
- Sport: Sports shooting

Francis Boisson (22 January 1928 – 23 December 2021) was a Monegasque sports shooter. He competed at the 1960 Summer Olympics and the 1972 Summer Olympics. Boisson died in December 2021, at the age of 93.
