= Julien Médecin =

Monegasque architect (1894-1986)

Olympic medal record

Art competitions
Bronze medal – third place	1924 Paris	Town planning

Julien Médecin
- Born: Julien; 3 November 1894; Monaco
- Died: 26 January 1986 (aged 91); Monaco
- Citizenship: Monaco
- Occupation: Architect
- Notable work: Fondation de Monaco
- Father: François Médecin
- Awards: Knight of the Legion of Honour Olympic bronze medal

Julien Médecin (3 November 1894 – 26 January 1986) was a Monegasque architect. He won a bronze medal in Designs for Town Planning at the 1924 Olympics in Paris for his design of the stadium for Monte Carlo in Fonteville with a cycling track, a rugby and football pitch, and a nautical basin.

== Career ==
Julien Médecin was born on November 3, 1884, in Monaco. Both his father François and his brother Marcel were also architects.

Médecin received his architecture diploma from the École des Beaux-arts in Paris in 1921. He returned home to work in Monaco and Nice in the 1930s. Médecin was a student of Gabriel Héraud and Victor Laloux; his work was primarily classified as art deco and modern architecture.

In 1937, Médecin designed the Fondation de Monaco student residence, which is part of the Cité internationale universitaire de Paris campus in Paris. He also designed the Villa Gloriette apartment building in Monaco, which was torn down in the 1960s.

Médecin joined the Société des architectes diplômés du gouvernement (S.A.D.G.) in 1944.

=== 1924 Summer Olympics ===
Médecin received a bronze medal for his design of the Stadium for Monte Carlo in Monaco at the 1924 Summer Olympics in Paris. As of January 2026, he remains the only Monegasque competitor to have won an Olympic medal in any discipline. The medals in art competitions are considered official medals by the IOC, but not as an olympic sport. Nevertheless, these medals are officially included in the country profiles and in the medal tables. However, most secondary sources only consider medals in sports competitions and list Monaco with zero medals. As a result, Monaco, which has appeared in 33 Olympic Games as of 2021, holds the mark for the most Olympic appearances without a sporting medal.

== Honors ==
- 1944: Knight of the Legion of Honour
- Commander of the Order of Saint Charles
