= Joe Barral =

Monegasque sports shooter (born 1945)

Personal information
- Born: 26 June 1945 (age 81) Monaco

Sport
- Sport: Sports shooting

Joe Barral (born 26 June 1945) is a Monegasque former sports shooter. He competed at the 1968, 1972 and the 1976 Summer Olympics.
