= Christophe Verdino =

Monegasque swimmer (born 1973)

Personal information
- Born: 29 June 1973 (age 53)

Sport
- Sport: Swimming

Christophe Verdino (born 29 June 1973) is a Monegasque swimmer. He competed at the 1992 Summer Olympics and the 1996 Summer Olympics.
