= Fabienne Diato-Pasetti =

Monagasque sport shooter (born 1965)

Personal information
- Born: October 4, 1965 (age 60) La Colle, Monaco

Sport
- Sport: Shooting
Medal record
Women's Shooting
Representing Monaco
Games of the Small States of Europe
Gold medal – first place	2005 Andorra	10 m air rifle

Fabienne Diato-Pasetti (born October 4, 1965 in La Colle, Monaco) is a Monégasque Olympic rifle shooter, who specializes in the 10 metre air rifle advent. She has competed in the 1988, 1992, 1996, 2000, 2004, and the 2008 Summer Olympics. Diato-Pasetti is one of only sixteen shooters to compete in at least six Olympic Games. She was also the first woman to represent Monaco at the Olympics.

== See also ==
- List of athletes with the most appearances at Olympic Games
