= Herman Schultz (sport shooter) =

Monegasque sports shooter

Personal information
- Born: 6 May 1901

Sport
- Sport: Sports shooting

Herman Schultz (born 6 May 1901, date of death unknown) was a Monegasque sports shooter. He competed at the 1924, 1936, 1948 and 1952 Summer Olympics.
