= Marcel Rué =

Monegasque sports shooter (1926–2017)

Personal information
- Born: 21 November 1926 Monaco
- Died: 9 August 2017 (aged 90)

Sport
- Sport: Sports shooting

Marcel Rué (21 November 1926 – 9 August 2017) was a Monegasque sports shooter. He competed at the 1952 Summer Olympics, 1960 Summer Olympics and 1976 Summer Olympics.
