= Pierre Marsan (sport shooter) =

Monegasque sports shooter (1916–2008)

Personal information
- Born: 16 August 1916 Monaco
- Died: 14 August 2008 (aged 91)

Sport
- Sport: Sports shooting

Pierre Marsan (16 August 1916 – 14 August 2008) was a Monegasque sports shooter. He competed at the 1936, 1948, 1952 and 1960 Summer Olympics.
