= Michel Ravarino =

Monegasque sports shooter and architect

Personal information
- Born: 23 January 1906 Monaco
- Died: 18 September 1988 (aged 82)

Sport
- Sport: Sports shooting

Michel Ravarino (23 January 1906 – 18 September 1988) was a Monegasque sports shooter. He competed at the 1936, 1948 and 1960 Summer Olympics.

He was also an architect, with his work being part of the architecture event in the art competition at the 1928 Summer Olympics.
