= Roger Abel (sport shooter) =

Monegasque sports shooter (1900–1982)

Personal information
- Full name: Roger Auguste Victor Abel
- Born: 8 April 1900 Monaco
- Died: 27 June 1982 (aged 82) Monaco

Sport
- Sport: Sports shooting

Roger Auguste Victor Abel (8 April 1900 – 27 June 1982) was a Monegasque sports shooter. He competed at the 1924, 1936, 1948 and 1952 Summer Olympics.
