= Monégasque Olympic Committee =

National Olympic Committee

- Country: Monaco
- Code: MON
- Created: 1907
- Recognized: 1953
- Continental Association: EOC
- Headquarters: Monaco
- President: Albert II, Prince of Monaco
- Secretary General: Yvette Lambin-Berti
- Website: www.comite-olympique.mc

The Monégasque Olympic Committee (French: Comité Olympique Monégasque; IOC Code: MON) is the National Olympic Committee representing Monaco.

== See also ==
- Monaco at the Olympics
