= List of flag bearers for Monaco at the Olympics =

Monaco at the Olympics
- IOC code: MON
- NOC: Comité Olympique Monégasque
- Website: www.comite-olympique.mc (in French)
- Medals: Gold 0 Silver 0 Bronze 0 Total 0

Summer appearances
- 1920; 1924; 1928; 1932; 1936; 1948; 1952; 1956; 1960; 1964; 1968; 1972; 1976; 1980; 1984; 1988; 1992; 1996; 2000; 2004; 2008; 2012; 2016; 2020; 2024

Winter appearances
- 1984; 1988; 1992; 1994; 1998; 2002; 2006; 2010; 2014; 2018; 2022; 2026

This is a list of flag bearers who have represented Monaco at the Olympics.

Flag bearers carry the national flag of their country at the opening ceremony of the Olympic Games.

#	Event year	Season	Flag bearer	Sport
1	1920	Summer	Edmond Médécin	Athletics
2	1924	Summer	Gaston Médécin	Athletics
3	1928	Summer		
4	1936	Summer		
5	1948	Summer		
6	1952	Summer		
7	1960	Summer		
8	1964	Summer	Joseph Asso	Official
9	1968	Summer		
10	1972	Summer	Jean-Charles Seneca	Fencing
11	1976	Summer	Francis Boisson	Shooting (Note: Did not compete.)
12	1984	Winter	David Lajoux	Alpine skiing
13	1984	Summer	Jean-Luc Adorno	Swimming
14	1988	Winter	Albert II, Prince of Monaco	Bobsleigh
15	1988	Summer	Stéphane Operto	Cycling
16	1992	Winter	Albert II, Prince of Monaco	Bobsleigh
17	1992	Summer	Christophe Verdino	Swimming
18	1994	Winter	Albert II, Prince of Monaco	Bobsleigh
19	1996	Summer	Thierry Vatrican	Judo
20	1998	Winter	Gilbert Bessi	Bobsleigh
21	2000	Summer	Thierry Vatrican	Judo
22	2002	Winter	Jean-François Calmes	Bobsleigh
23	2004	Summer	Sébastien Gattuso	Athletics
24	2006	Winter	Patrice Servelle	Bobsleigh
25	2008	Summer	Mathias Raymond	Rowing
26	2010	Winter	Alexandra Coletti	Alpine skiing
27	2012	Summer	Angelique Trinquier	Swimming
28	2014	Winter	Olivier Jenot	Alpine skiing
29	2016	Summer	Brice Etès	Athletics
30	2018	Winter	Rudy Rinaldi	Bobsleigh
31	2020	Summer	Quentin Antognelli	Rowing
31	2020	Summer	Xiaoxin Yang	Table tennis
32	2022	Winter	Arnaud Alessandria	Alpine skiing
33	2024	Summer	Théo Druenne	Swimming
33	2024	Summer	Lisa Pou	Swimming

== See also ==
- Monaco at the Olympics
