= Monaco at the 1992 Winter Olympics =

- IOC code: MON
- NOC: Comité Olympique Monégasque
- Website: www.comite-olympique.mc (in French)

in Albertville
- Competitors: 5 (men) in 1 sport
- Flag bearer: Albert Grimaldi (bobsleigh)
- Officials: 0
- Medals: Gold 0 Silver 0 Bronze 0 Total 0

Winter Olympics appearances (overview)
- 1984; 1988; 1992; 1994; 1998; 2002; 2006; 2010; 2014; 2018; 2022; 2026

Monaco participated at the 1992 Winter Olympics in Albertville, France held between 8 and 23 February 1992. The country's participation in the Games marked its third appearance at the Winter Olympics since its debut in the 1984 Games.

The Monaco team consisted of five athletes who competed in a single sport. Albert Grimaldi served as the country's flag-bearer during the opening ceremony. Monaco did not win any medal in the Games, and has not won a Winter Olympics medal as of these Games.

== Background ==
Monaco first participated in Olympic competition at the 1920 Antwerp Olympics, and have participated in most Summer Olympic Games since. The Comité Olympique Monégasque (the National Olympic Committee (NOC) of Monaco) was recognised by the International Olympic Committee on 1 January 1953. The 1984 Winter Olympics marked Monaco's first participation in the Winter Olympics. After the nation made its debut in the 1984 Games, this edition of the Games in 1992 marked the nation's third appearance at the Winter Games.

The 1992 Winter Olympics was held in Albertville held between 8 and 23 February 1992. The Monegasque team consisted of five athletes who competed in a single sport. Albert Grimaldi served as the country's flag-bearer during the opening ceremony. Monaco did not win any medal in the Games, and has not won a Winter Olympics medal as of these Games.

== Competitors ==
Monaco sent five athletes who competed in a single sport at the Games.

Sport	Men	Women	Total
Bobsleigh	5	0	5
Total	5	0	5

== Bobsleigh ==
Monaco qualified two sleds for the two-man event and a single sled for the four-man event. Albert Grimaldi was the son of Rainier III, then prince of Monaco. The 1988 Winter Olympics marked his debut in the Winter Olympics, and this was his second appearance at the Games. He served in the navy earlier, and would later become the prince of Monaco in 2005. This was the first Winter Olympic appearance for all the other athletes–Gilbert Bessi, David Tomatis, Michel Vatrican, and Pascal Camia. Bessi also competed in the men's 100 metres event in the 1988 Summer Olympics.

The bobsleigh events were held at La Plagne. The track was completed in 1990. The 1,507 m (4,944 ft) long track had 19 curves and a vertical drop of 124 m (407 ft). About 92 teams competed in the two-man event held between 15 and 16 February. The first Monegasque team of Bessi and Vatrican was classified in 28th and the second team of Grimaldi and Camia in 44th place in the final classification. In the four-man event, the team finished with a combined time of over four minutes and two seconds, more than eight seconds behind the first ranked Austrian team. The team was ranked 27th amongst the 124 teams in the competition.

Sled	Athletes	Event	Run 1		Run 2		Run 3		Run 4		Total	
Sled	Athletes	Event	Time	Rank	Time	Rank	Time	Rank	Time	Rank	Time	Rank
MON-1	Gilbert Bessi; Michel Vatrican	Two-man	1:01.55	23	1:02.09	24	1:02.08	22	1:02.41	28	4:08.13	23
MON-2	Albert Grimaldi; Pascal Camia	Two-man	1:03.57	44	1:03.88	42	1:03.93	43	1:04.04	44	4:15.42	43
MON-1	Albert Grimaldi; David Tomatis; Gilbert Bessi; Michel Vatrican	Four-man	1:00.49	28	1:00.66	28	1:00.74	27	1:00.74	27	4:02.63	27
