= Monaco at the 2002 Winter Olympics =

- IOC code: MON
- NOC: Comité Olympique Monégasque
- Website: www.comite-olympique.mc (in French)

in Salt Lake City
- Competitors: 5 (men) in 1 sport
- Flag bearer: Jean-François Calmes
- Medals: Gold 0 Silver 0 Bronze 0 Total 0

Winter Olympics appearances (overview)
- 1984; 1988; 1992; 1994; 1998; 2002; 2006; 2010; 2014; 2018; 2022; 2026

Monaco participated in the 2002 Winter Olympics in Salt Lake City, United States, held between 8 and 24 February 2002. The country's participation in the Games marked its sixth appearance at the Winter Olympics since its debut in the 1984 Games.

The Monaco team consisted of five athletes who competed in a single sport. Jean-François Calmes served as the country's flag-bearer during the opening ceremony. Monaco did not win any medal in the Games, and has not won a Winter Olympics medal as of these Games.

== Background ==
Monaco first participated in Olympic competition at the 1920 Antwerp Olympics, and have participated in most Summer Olympic Games since. The Comité Olympique Monégasque (the National Olympic Committee (NOC) of Monaco) was recognised by the International Olympic Committee on 1 January 1953. The 1984 Winter Olympics marked Monaco's first participation in the Winter Olympics. After the nation made its debut in the 1984 Games, this edition of the Games in 2002 marked the nation's sixth appearance at the Winter Games.

The 2002 Winter Olympics was held in Salt Lake City between 8 and 24 February 2002. The Monegasque team consisted of five athletes who competed in a single sport. Jean-François Calmes served as the country's flag-bearer during the opening ceremony. Monaco did not win any medal in the Games, and has not won a Winter Olympics medal as of these Games.

== Competitors ==
Monaco sent five athletes who competed in a single sport at the Games.

Sport	Men	Women	Total
Bobsleigh	5	0	5
Total	5	0	5

== Bobsleigh ==
Monaco qualified a sled each for the two-man and four-man events. Albert Grimaldi was the son of Rainier III, then prince of Monaco. The 1988 Winter Olympics marked his debut in the Winter Olympics, and this was his fifth and last appearance at the Games. He served in the navy earlier, and would later become the prince of Monaco in 2005. This was the second Olympic appearance for flag-bearer Jean-François Calmes. This was the first Olympic Games for three of the five men. Patrice Servelle, Sébastien Gattuso, and Charles Oula made their debut at the Winter Games.

The bobsleigh events were held at the Utah Olympic Park situated 15 km (9.3 mi) from Salt Lake City. The venue was opened in January 1997 and has hosted a World Cup previously. The 1,335 m (4,380 ft) track had 14 curves, and a vertical drop of 103.5 m (340 ft). About 75 teams competed in the two-man event held between 16 and 17 February. The Monegasque team was classified in 22nd place in the final classification. In the four-man event, the team finished with a combined time of over three minutes and 19 seconds, more than nine seconds behind the first ranked German team. The team was ranked 28th amongst the 127 teams in the competition.

Athletes	Event	Run 1		Run 2		Run 3		Run 4		Total	
Athletes	Event	Time	Rank	Time	Rank	Time	Rank	Time	Rank	Time	Rank
Sébastien Gattuso; Patrice Servelle	Two-man	48.37	20	48.56	25	48.43	20	48.76	27	3:14.12	22
Albert Grimaldi; Charles Oula; Jean-François Calmes; Patrice Servelle; Sébastien Gattuso	Four-man	47.82	25	48.02	25	52.44	30	48.91	24	3:17.19	28
