= Monaco at the 2014 Winter Olympics =

- IOC code: MON
- NOC: Comité Olympique Monégasque
- Website: www.comite-olympique.mc (in French)

in Sochi
- Competitors: 5 in 2 sports
- Flag bearers: Olivier Jenot (opening); Rudy Rinaldi (closing)
- Medals: Gold 0 Silver 0 Bronze 0 Total 0

Winter Olympics appearances (overview)
- 1984; 1988; 1992; 1994; 1998; 2002; 2006; 2010; 2014; 2018; 2022; 2026

Monaco participated at the 2014 Winter Olympics in Sochi, Russia held between 7 and 23 February 2014. The country's participation in the Games marked its ninth appearance at the Winter Olympics since its debut in the 1984 Games.

The Monaco team consisted of five athletes who competed across two sports. Olivier Jenot served as the country's flag-bearer during the opening ceremony and Rudy Rinaldi served as the flag-bearer during the closing ceremony. Monaco did not win any medal in the Games, and has not won a Winter Olympics medal as of these Games.

== Background ==
Monaco first participated in Olympic competition at the 1920 Antwerp Olympics, and have participated in most Summer Olympic Games since. The Comité Olympique Monégasque (the National Olympic Committee (NOC) of Monaco) was recognised by the International Olympic Committee on 1 January 1953. The 1984 Winter Olympics marked Monaco's first participation in the Winter Olympics. After the nation made its debut in the 1984 Games, this edition of the Games in 2014 marked the nation's ninth appearance at the Winter Games.

The 2014 Winter Olympics was held in Sochi held between 7 and 23 February 2014. The Monegasque team consisted of five athletes who competed across two sports. Olivier Jenot served as the country's flag-bearer during the opening ceremony. Rudy Rinaldi carried as the national flag during the closing ceremony. Monaco did not win any medal in the Games, and has not won a Winter Olympics medal as of these Games.

== Competitors ==
Monaco sent five athletes who competed in two sports at the Games.

Sport	Men	Women	Total
Alpine skiing	3	0	3
Bobsleigh	2	0	2
Total	5	0	5

== Alpine skiing ==
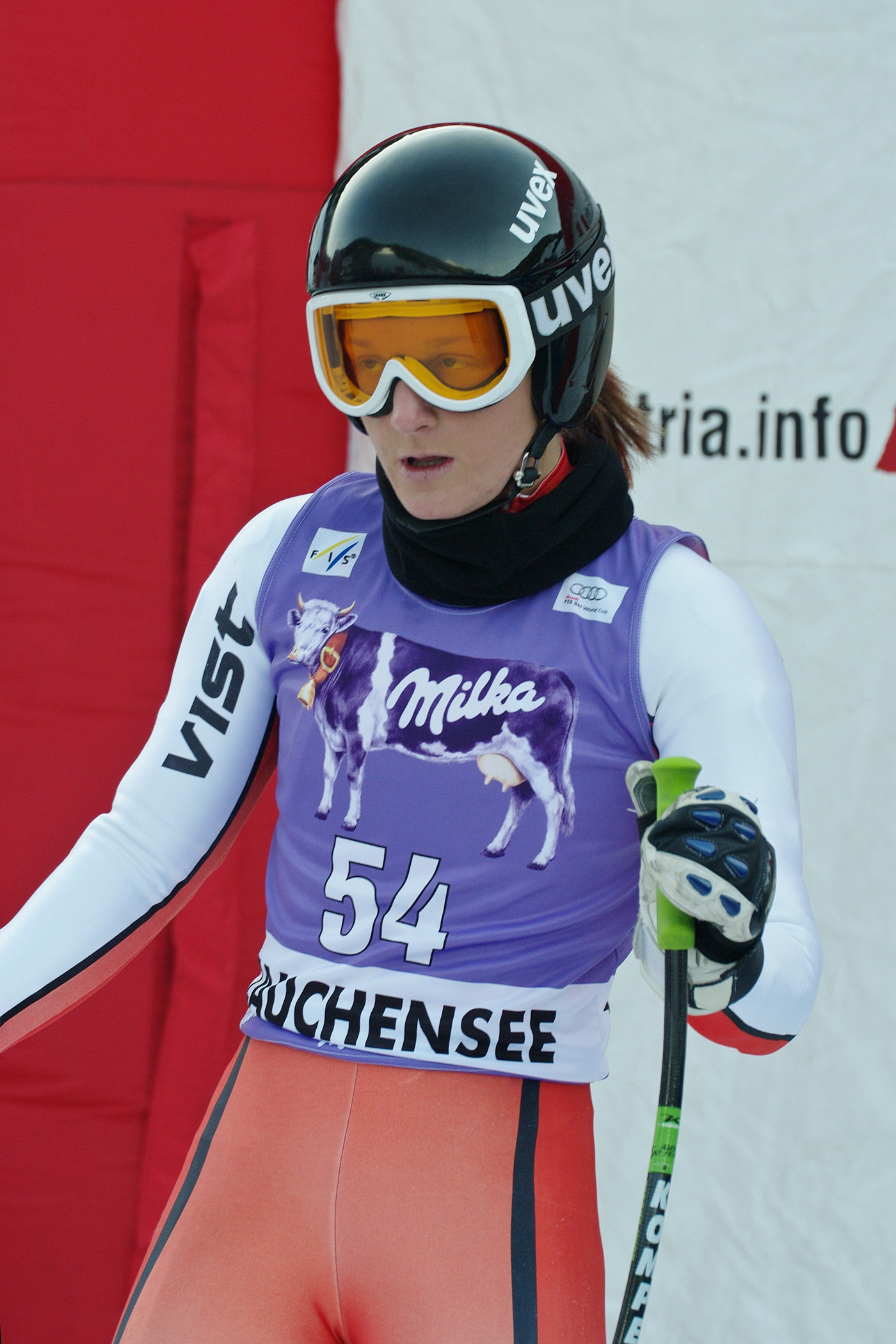
Alexandra Coletti took part in her third straight Winter Olympics

The qualification quotas were allocated based on athletes satisfying he criteria laid out by International Ski Federation, subject to a maximum cap per country. As per the final quota allocation released on 20 January 2014, Monaco qualified three athletes for the Games. While Alexandra Coletti competed in two women's events, Arnaud Alessandria and Olivier Jenot qualified for three and four individual men's events respectively. Coletti was the most experienced of the trio, competing in her third straight Winter Olympic Games since her debut in 2006. This was the second consecutive Olympic appearance for Jenot after the 2006 Games. Alessandria made his debut at the Winter Olympics.

The events were held at the Rosa Khutor Alpine Center in Krasnaya Polyana. The facility was constructed especially for the Olympic Games in the Caucuses, about 50 km (31 mi) from the Black Sea coast. It was designed by 1972 Olympic gold medalist Bernhard Russi. Amongst the nine entries across events, there were only three classified finishes by the Monegasque athletes. While Alessandria registered his only finish in the men's downhill, Coletti did not finish both of her events. Jenot registered finishes in two of the four events he competed in, ranking 28th and 35th in the men's combined and super-G events respectively.

Athlete	Event	Run 1		Run 2		Total	
Athlete	Event	Time	Rank	Time	Rank	Time	Rank
Arnaud Alessandria	Men's combined	1:57.59	36	DNF			
Arnaud Alessandria	Men's downhill	—N/a				2:12.71	39
Arnaud Alessandria	Men's super-G	—N/a				DNF	
Olivier Jenot	Men's combined	1:59.81	45	56.01	25	2:55.82	28
Olivier Jenot	Men's giant slalom	DNF					
Olivier Jenot	Men's slalom	55.89	59	DNF			
Olivier Jenot	Men's super-G	—N/a				1:22.20	35
Alexandra Coletti	Women's combined	DNF					
Alexandra Coletti	Women's downhill	—N/a				DNF	

== Bobsleigh ==
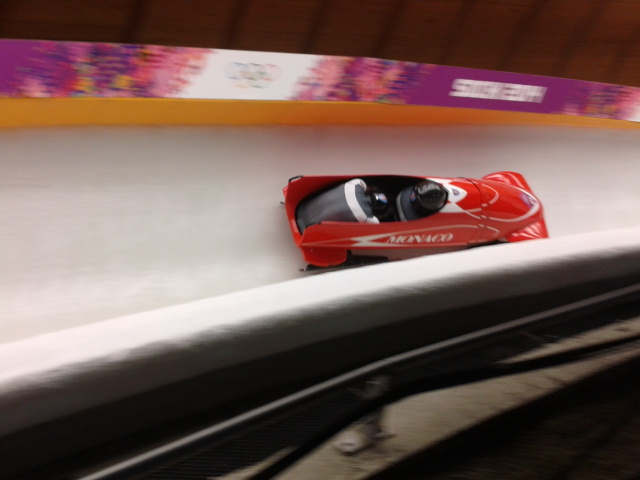
Monaco in the two-man bobsleigh competition

As per the International Bobsleigh & Skeleton Federation, a maximum of 170 quota spots (130 men, 40 women) were available for the Games. The qualification was based on the world rankings as on 20 January 2014. The athletes must be ranked in top 50 for the men's event and should have competed in five different races on three different tracks during the two previous seasons. Monaco qualified a two-man sled for the event based on the rankings. Sébastien Gattuso made his Winter Olympics debut in the 2002 Winter Olympics, and this was his third participation in the Winter Games. He had also taken part in two Summer Olympics for Monaco in the 100 metres event. Patrice Servelle competed in his fourth straight Winter Olympics in the bobsleigh event. He partnered with Gattuso in 2002 and 2010, and was paired with Jérémy Bottin in 2006.

The bobsleigh events were held at the Sanki Sliding Centre in Rzhanaya Polyana, located about 60 km (37 mi) from Sochi. The track was opened in 2012 and consisted of a 1,365 m (4,478 ft) course with 19 curves. In the contest, the team was ranked 21st after the first three runs. As only the top 20 teams made it to the final run, the Monegasque pair was eliminated. However, the pair were classified in 19th place in the revised classification as two Russian teams, which finished first and fourth, were later disqualified due to doping.

Athlete	Event	Run 1		Run 2		Run 3		Run 4		Total	
Athlete	Event	Time	Rank	Time	Rank	Time	Rank	Time	Rank	Time	Rank
Sébastien Gattuso; Patrice Servelle*	Two-man	57.50	20	57.30	20	57.80	26	Did not advance		2:52.60	19

* – Denotes the driver of each sled
