= Monaco at the 2006 Winter Olympics =

- IOC code: MON
- NOC: Comité Olympique Monégasque
- Website: www.comite-olympique.mc (in French)

in Turin
- Competitors: 4 (3 men, 1 woman) in 2 sports
- Flag bearer: Patrice Servelle
- Medals: Gold 0 Silver 0 Bronze 0 Total 0

Winter Olympics appearances (overview)
- 1984; 1988; 1992; 1994; 1998; 2002; 2006; 2010; 2014; 2018; 2022; 2026

Monaco participated at the 2006 Winter Olympics in Turin, Italy held between 10 and 26 February 2006. The country's participation in the Games marked its seventh appearance at the Winter Olympics since its debut in the 1984 Games.

The Monaco team consisted of four athletes who competed across two sports. Patrice Servelle served as the country's flag-bearer during the opening and closing ceremonies. Monaco did not win any medal in the Games, and has not won a Winter Olympics medal as of these Games.

== Background ==
Monaco first participated in Olympic competition at the 1920 Antwerp Olympics, and have participated in most Summer Olympic Games since. The Comité Olympique Monégasque (the National Olympic Committee (NOC) of Monaco) was recognised by the International Olympic Committee on 1 January 1953. The 1984 Winter Olympics marked Monaco's first participation in the Winter Olympics. After the nation made its debut in the 1984 Games, this edition of the Games in 2006 marked the nation's seventh appearance at the Winter Games.

The 2006 Winter Olympics was held in Turin held between 10 and 26 February 2006. The Monegasque team consisted of four athletes who competed across two sports. Patrice Servelle served as the country's flag-bearer during the opening and closing ceremonies. Monaco did not win any medal in the Games, and has not won a Winter Olympics medal as of these Games.

== Competitors ==
Monaco sent four athletes who competed in two sports at the Games.

| Sport | Men | Women | Total |
|---|---|---|---|
| Alpine skiing | 1 | 1 | 2 |
| Bobsleigh | 2 | 0 | 2 |
| Total | 3 | 1 | 4 |

== Alpine skiing ==
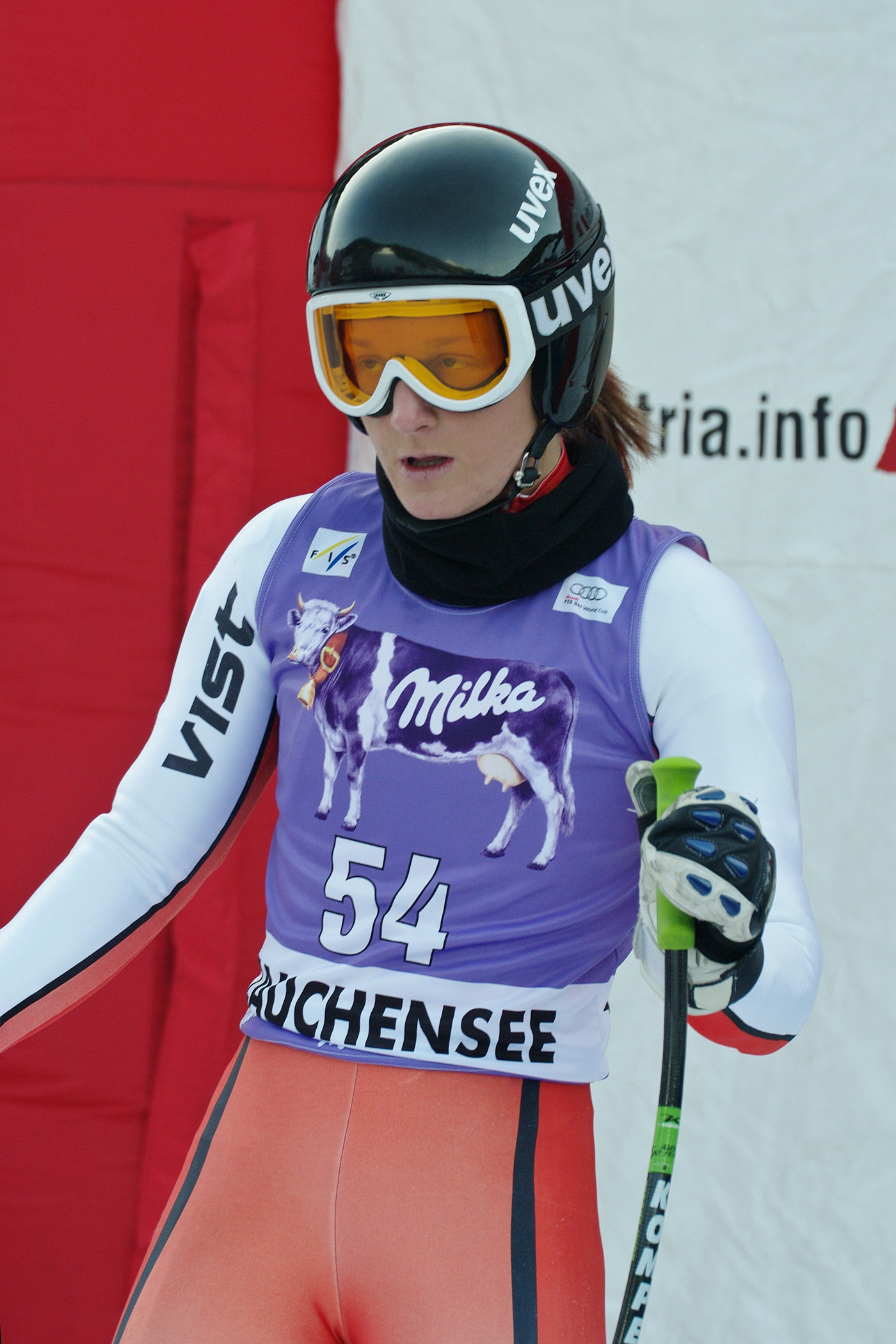
Alexandra Coletti made her debut in the Winter Olympics

Monaco qualified two athletes for the alpine skiing events. While Alexandra Coletti competed in all five women's events, Olivier Jenot qualified for three individual men's events respectively. Both Coletti and Jenot made their debut at the Winter Olympics in the Games.

The Alpine skiing events were held at Sestriere, about 60 km (37 mi) from Turin. The events were held on three different slopes of Borgata Sestriere, Colle Sestriere and San Sicario. The cold weather and heavy snow resulted in several delays and postponements. Amongst the five events, Coletti registered a finish in only three of the events. Her best finish came in the women's downhill event, in which she finished 31st amongst the 44 participants. Jenot registered his best finish in the men's slalom event.

| Athlete | Event | Run 1 | Run 2 | Total | Rank |
|---|---|---|---|---|---|
| Alexandra Coletti | Women's downhill | —N/a | | 2:01.34 | 31 |
| Alexandra Coletti | Women's super-G | —N/a | | 1:37.02 | 41 |
| Alexandra Coletti | Women's giant slalom | DNF | | | |
| Alexandra Coletti | Women's slalom | 45.38 | 50.58 | 1:35.96 | 33 |
| Alexandra Coletti | Women's combined | DNF | | | |
| Olivier Jenot | Men's super-G | —N/a | | 1:37.03 | 48 |
| Olivier Jenot | Men's giant slalom | DNF | | | |
| Olivier Jenot | Men's slalom | 1:03.85 | 55.28 | 1:59.13 | 34 |

== Bobsleigh ==
Monaco qualified a two-man sled for the event based on the rankings. Patrice Servelle competed in his second straight Winter Olympics in the bobsleigh event, while Jeremy Bottin made his debut. He partnered with Sébastien Gattuso in the previous Olympics.

The bobsleigh events were held at the Cesana Pariol track at Cesana Torinese, about 70 km (43 mi) from Turin in a newly constructed course for the Olympics. The 1,435 m (4,708 ft) long course was fast and difficult to navigate resulting in injuries during testing in 2004. Hence, three of the nineteen curves were modified for safety in January 2005. About 58 teams competed in the two-man event held between 17 and 19 February. As per the competition format, only the top twenty in the standings at the end of the third run qualified for the final run. The Monegasque team was ranked in 12th place after the three runs, and hence qualified for the final run. The team was classified in 12th place in the final classification.

| Athlete | Event | Final | | | | | |
| Athlete | Event | Run 1 | Run 2 | Run 3 | Run 4 | Total | Rank |
|---|---|---|---|---|---|---|---|
| Jeremy Bottin; Patrice Servelle | Two-man | 56.21 | 56.13 | 56.67 | 57.08 | 3:46.09 | 12 |
