= Monaco at the 1994 Winter Olympics =

- IOC code: MON
- NOC: Comité Olympique Monégasque
- Website: www.comite-olympique.mc (in French)

in Lillehammer
- Competitors: 5 (men) in 2 sports
- Flag bearer: Albert Grimaldi (bobsleigh)
- Medals: Gold 0 Silver 0 Bronze 0 Total 0

Winter Olympics appearances (overview)
- 1984; 1988; 1992; 1994; 1998; 2002; 2006; 2010; 2014; 2018; 2022; 2026

Monaco participated at the 1994 Winter Olympics in Lillehammer, Norway held between 12 and 27 February 1994. The country's participation in the Games marked its fourth appearance at the Winter Olympics since its debut in the 1984 Games.

The Monaco team consisted of five athletes who competed across two sports. Albert Grimaldi served as the country's flag-bearer during the opening ceremony. Monaco did not win any medal in the Games, and has not won a Winter Olympics medal as of these Games.

== Background ==
Monaco first participated in Olympic competition at the 1920 Antwerp Olympics, and have participated in most Summer Olympic Games since. The Comité Olympique Monégasque (the National Olympic Committee (NOC) of Monaco) was recognised by the International Olympic Committee on 1 January 1953. The 1984 Winter Olympics marked Monaco's first participation in the Winter Olympics. After the nation made its debut in the 1984 Games, this edition of the Games in 1994 marked the nation's fourth appearance at the Winter Games.

The 1994 Winter Olympics was held in Lillehammer held between 12 and 27 February 1994. The Monegasque team consisted of five athletes who competed across two sports. Albert Grimaldi served as the country's flag-bearer during the opening ceremony. Monaco did not win any medal in the Games, and has not won a Winter Olympics medal as of these Games.

== Competitors ==
Monaco sent five athletes who competed in two sports at the Games.

Sport	Men	Women	Total
Alpine skiing	1	0	1
Bobsleigh	4	–	4
Total	5	0	5

== Alpine skiing ==
Monaco qualified a single athlete for the alpine skiing events. Julien Castellini qualified for a single event in the men's category. At 18 years of age, this was Castellini's only participation in the Winter Games.

The Alpine skiing events were between 13 and 27 February. The technical events (giant slalom and slalom) were contested at Hafjell in Øyer Municipality and the speed events (downhill and super-G) were held at Kvitfjell in Ringebu Municipality, about 50 km (31 mi) from Lillehammer. Castellini did not register a finish in the only event he contested.

Athlete	Event	Time	Rank
Julien Castellini	Super-G	DNF	–

== Bobsleigh ==
Monaco qualified a sled each for the two-man and four-man events. Albert Grimaldi was the son of Rainier III, then prince of Monaco. The 1988 Winter Olympics marked his debut in the Winter Olympics, and this was his third appearance at the Games. He served in the navy earlier, and would later become the prince of Monaco in 2005. This was the second Olympic appearance for Gilbert Bessi, Pascal Camia and David Tomatis. Bessi also competed in the men's 100 metres event in the 1988 Summer Olympics.

The bobsleigh events were held at Hunderfossen, about 15 km (9.3 mi) from Lillehammer. The track was completed in 1990 and regular competitions were held since 1991. The 1,395 m (4,577 ft) long track had 16 curves and a vertical drop of 114 m (374 ft). 43 teams competed in the two-man event held between 19 and 20 February. The Monegasque team was classified in 31st place in the final classification. In the four-man event, the team finished with a combined time of over three minutes and 34 seconds, more than six seconds behind the first ranked German team. The team was ranked 26th amongst the 30 teams in the competition.

Athletes	Event	Run 1		Run 2		Run 3		Run 4		Total	
Athletes	Event	Time	Rank	Time	Rank	Time	Rank	Time	Rank	Time	Rank
Albert Grimaldi; Gilbert Bessi	Two-man	54.14	30	54.73	34	54.57	32	54.83	33	3:38.27	31
Albert Grimaldi; David Tomatis; Gilbert Bessi; Pascal Camia	Four-man	53.54	27	53.58	27	53.75	26	53.75	26	3:34.62	26
