= Monaco at the 1998 Winter Olympics =

- IOC code: MON
- NOC: Comité Olympique Monégasque
- Website: www.comite-olympique.mc (in French)

in Nagano
- Competitors: 4 (men) in 1 sport
- Flag bearer: Gilbert Bessi
- Medals: Gold 0 Silver 0 Bronze 0 Total 0

Winter Olympics appearances (overview)
- 1984; 1988; 1992; 1994; 1998; 2002; 2006; 2010; 2014; 2018; 2022; 2026

Monaco participated in the 1998 Winter Olympics in Nagano, Japan, held between 7 and 23 February 1998. The country's participation in the Games marked its fifth appearance at the Winter Olympics since its debut in the 1984 Games.

The Monaco team consisted of four athletes who competed in a single sport. Gilbert Bessi served as the country's flag-bearer during the opening ceremony. Monaco did not win any medal in the Games, and has not won a Winter Olympics medal as of these Games.

== Background ==
Monaco first participated in Olympic competition at the 1920 Antwerp Olympics, and have participated in most Summer Olympic Games since. The Comité Olympique Monégasque (the National Olympic Committee (NOC) of Monaco) was recognised by the International Olympic Committee on 1 January 1953. The 1984 Winter Olympics marked Monaco's first participation in the Winter Olympics. After the nation made its debut in the 1984 Games, this edition of the Games in 1998 marked the nation's fifth appearance at the Winter Games.

The 1998 Winter Olympics was held in Nagano between 7 and 23 February 1998. The Monegasque team consisted of four athletes who competed in a single sport. Gilbert Bessi served as the country's flag-bearer during the opening ceremony. Monaco did not win any medal in the Games, and has not won a Winter Olympics medal as of these Games.

== Competitors ==
Monaco sent four athletes who competed in a single sport at the Games.

Sport	Men	Women	Total
Bobsleigh	4	0	4
Total	4	0	4

== Bobsleigh ==
Monaco qualified a sled each for the two-man and four-man events. This was the third and final Olympic appearance for flag-bearer Gilbert Bessi. He also competed in the men's 100 metres event in the 1988 Summer Olympics. His partner Jean-François Calmes appeared in his first Olympics. Albert Grimaldi was the son of Rainier III, then prince of Monaco. The 1988 Winter Olympics marked his debut in the Winter Olympics, and this was his fourth appearance at the Games. He served in the navy earlier, and would later become the prince of Monaco in 2005. Pascal Camia competed in his third consecutive Winter Games, having made his debut in the 1992 Winter Olympics.

The bobsleigh events were held at Mount Iizuna. The venue which was custom built for the Games, was the first artificial bobsleigh course in Asia. The 1,700 m (5,600 ft) long course had fifteen curves and two uphill sections. About 76 teams competed in the two-man event held between 14 and 15 February. The Monegasque team was classified in 24th place in the final classification. In the four-man event, the team finished with a combined time of over two minutes and 47 seconds, more than seven seconds behind the first ranked German team. The team was ranked 28th amongst the 128 teams in the competition.

Athletes	Event	Run 1		Run 2		Run 3		Run 4		Total	
Athletes	Event	Time	Rank	Time	Rank	Time	Rank	Time	Rank	Time	Rank
Gilbert Bessi; Jean-François Calmes	Two-man	55.89	25	55.86	25	55.92	25	55.87	25	3:43.54	24
Albert Grimaldi; Gilbert Bessi; Jean-François Calmes; Pacal Camia	Four-man	55.58	28	55.70	30	55.86	29	—N/a		2:47.14	28
