= Botwin =

Botwin is a surname. Notable people with the surname include:

- Nancy Botwin, character in the television series Weeds
- Naftali Botwin (1907–1925), Polish communist and labour activist
- Will Botwin (born 1948), American talent manager

== See also ==
- Bottin (surname)
