= Monaco at the 2010 Winter Olympics =

- IOC code: MON
- NOC: Comité Olympique Monégasque
- Website: www.comite-olympique.mc (in French)

in Vancouver
- Competitors: 3 in 2 sports
- Flag bearer: Alexandra Coletti
- Medals: Gold 0 Silver 0 Bronze 0 Total 0

Winter Olympics appearances (overview)
- 1984; 1988; 1992; 1994; 1998; 2002; 2006; 2010; 2014; 2018; 2022; 2026

Monaco sent a delegation to complete at the 2010 Winter Olympics in Vancouver, British Columbia, Canada from 12–28 February 2010. The Monégasque team consisted of three athletes: alpine skier Alexandra Coletti and a two-man bobsleigh team of Sébastien Gattuso and Patrice Servelle. The bobsleigh team finished 19th in their event, as did Coletti in her best event, the women's super combined.

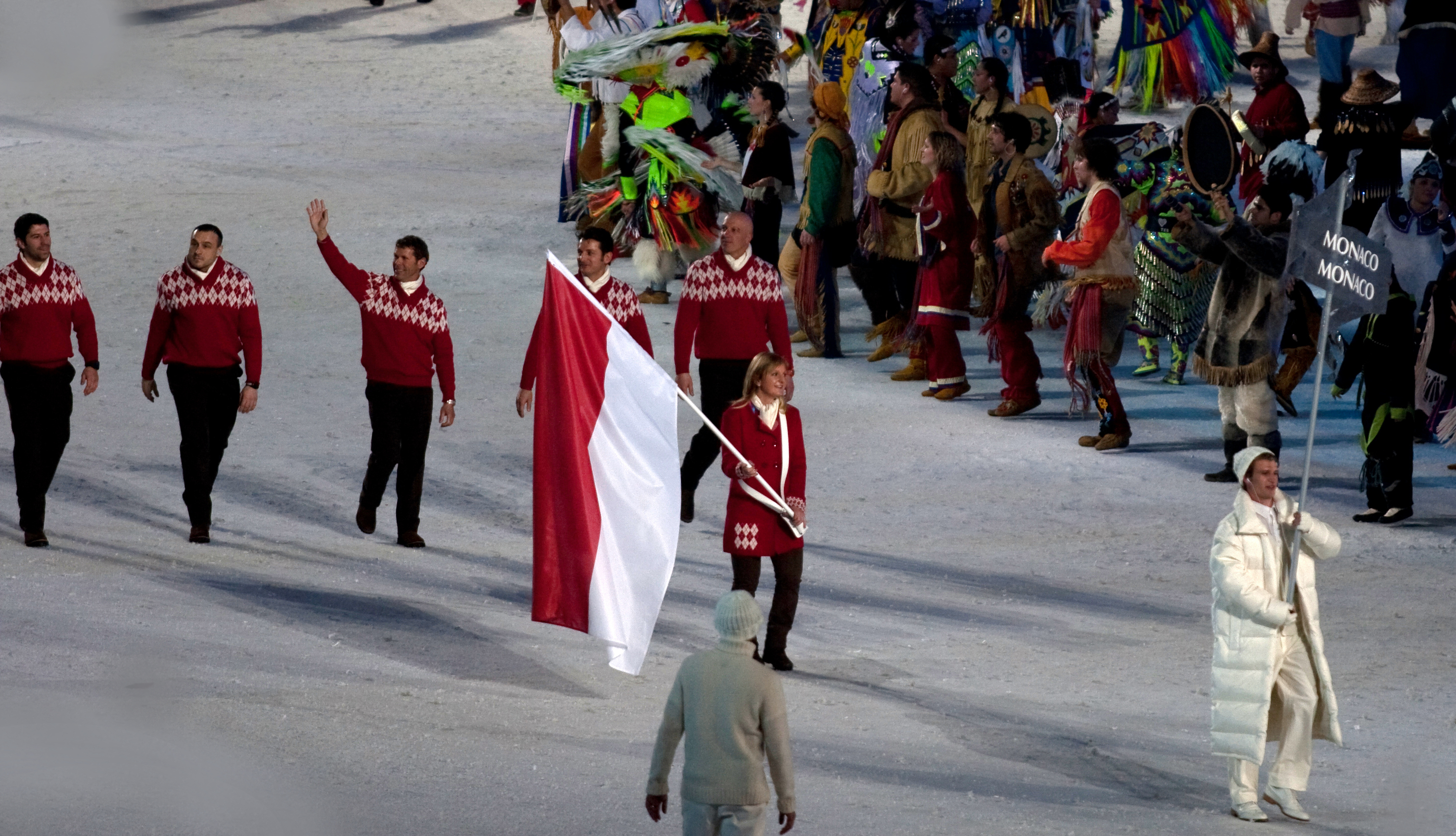
The athletes entering the stadium during the opening ceremonies.

== Background ==
The Principality of Monaco first participated in the Summer Olympics in 1920, and with the exceptions of 1932, 1956, and the boycotted 1980 Moscow Games have participated in every Summer Olympics since. The nation made its first Winter Olympic Games appearance in the 1984 Sarajevo Olympics, and have participated in every Winter Olympics since. No Monégasque athlete has ever won a medal at the Olympics. For the 2010 Vancouver Olympics, the Monégasque team consisted of three competitors, alpine skier Alexandra Coletti and the two-man bobsleigh team of Sébastien Gattuso and Patrice Servelle. Coletti was chosen as the flag bearer for the opening ceremony, while Servelle was chosen as flag bearer for the closing ceremony.

== Alpine skiing ==
Alexandra Coletti was 26 years old at the time of the Vancouver Olympics. She had previously competed for Monaco at the 2006 Winter Olympics, and would go on to participate for Monaco in the 2014 and 2018 Olympics as well. The women's downhill was held on 17 February, and was a single-run race. Coletti would finish with a time of 1 minute and 48 seconds, which put her in 24th place, out of 37 skiers who completed the run. The super combined consisted of one run of downhill skiing, and one run of super-G skiing, the final placement was the sum of the two run times. Coletti posted times of 47 seconds on the slalom portion, and 1 minute and 26 seconds on the downhill portion of the race. Her combined time of 2 minutes and 13 seconds placed her 19th, out of 28 competitors who finished both runs of the race. In the super-G, held two days later, she finished with a time of 1 minute and 24 seconds, which was good for 25th place out of 38 competitors who finished the race. The giant slalom on 24 February was heavily affected by weather, and Coletti was one of 17 competitors unable to finish the first run of the race.

Athlete	Event	Run 1	Run 2	Total Time	Rank
Alexandra Coletti	Women's downhill	N/A	N/A	1:48.92	24
Alexandra Coletti	Women's super-G	N/A	N/A	1:24.56	25
Alexandra Coletti	Women's giant slalom	DNF	N/A	N/A	N/A
Alexandra Coletti	Women's super combined	47.07	1:26.74	2:13.81	19

== Bobsleigh ==
Sébastien Gattuso was 38 years old at the Time of the Vancouver Olympics, while his partner Patrice Servelle was 35 years of age. The two-man event was four runs of the course, held over two days, with total time combined used for final placement. Only the top 20 sleds would be allowed to progress to the final run. The first two runs were held on 20 February, and the Monégasque sled posted times of 52.96 seconds and 52.51 seconds. They ended the first day in 18th place. Runs 3 and 4 were held the next day, and they completed run 3 in 52.71 seconds, enough to allow them to compete in the final run later that day. For the final run, they completed the race in 52.56 seconds; this ranked them 19th for the total competition.

Athlete	Event	Final					
Athlete	Event	Run 1	Run 2	Run 3	Run 4	Total	Rank
Sébastien Gattuso; Patrice Servelle	Two-man	52.96	52.61	52.71	52.56	3:30.84	19

== See also ==
- Monaco at the 2010 Summer Youth Olympics
