= Bottin (surname) =

Bottin is a surname. Notable people with the surname include:

- Guglielmo Bottin (born 1977), Italian music producer, scholar and DJ better known as Bottin
- Jérémy Bottin (born 1973), Monegasque bobsledder
- Lucien Bottin (1881–1961), Belgian wrestler
- Pina Bottin (1933–2024), Italian actress
- Rob Bottin (born 1959), American special make-up effects creator
- Sébastien Bottin (1764–1853), French statistician
