= Monaco at the 2018 Winter Olympics =

- Flag of Monaco
- IOC code: MON
- NOC: Monégasque Olympic Committee
- Website: www.comite-olympique.mc

in Pyeongchang, South Korea 9–25 February 2018
- Competitors: 4 (3 men and 1 woman) in 2 sports
- Flag bearer (opening): Rudy Rinaldi
- Flag bearer (closing): Boris Vain
- Medals: Gold 0 Silver 0 Bronze 0 Total 0

Winter Olympics appearances (overview)
- 1984; 1988; 1992; 1994; 1998; 2002; 2006; 2010; 2014; 2018; 2022; 2026

Monaco participated at the 2018 Winter Olympics held in Pyeongchang held between 9 and 25 February 2018. The country's participation in the Games marked its tenth appearance at the Winter Olympics since its debut in the 1984 Games.

The Monaco team consisted of four athletes who competed across two sports. Rudy Rinaldi served as the country's flag-bearer during the opening ceremony and Boris Vain served as the flag-bearer during the closing ceremony. Monaco did not win any medal in the Games, and has not won a Winter Olympics medal as of these Games.

== Background ==
Monaco first participated in Olympic competition at the 1920 Antwerp Olympics, and have participated in most Summer Olympic Games since. The Comité Olympique Monégasque (the National Olympic Committee (NOC) of Monaco) was recognised by the International Olympic Committee on 1 January 1953. The 1984 Winter Olympics marked Monaco's first participation in the Winter Olympics. After the nation made its debut in the 1984 Games, this edition of the Games in 2018 marked the nation's tenth appearance at the Winter Games.

The 2018 Winter Olympics was held in Pyeongchang held between 9 and 25 February 2018. The Monegasque team consisted of four athletes who competed across two sports. Rudy Rinaldi served as the country's flag-bearer during the opening ceremony. Boris Vain carried the national flag during the closing ceremony. Monaco did not win any medal in the Games, and has not won a Winter Olympics medal as of these Games.

== Competitors ==
Monaco sent four athletes who competed in two sports at the Games.

| Sport | Men | Women | Total |
|---|---|---|---|
| Alpine skiing | 1 | 1 | 2 |
| Bobsleigh | 2 | 0 | 2 |
| Total | 3 | 1 | 4 |

== Alpine skiing ==
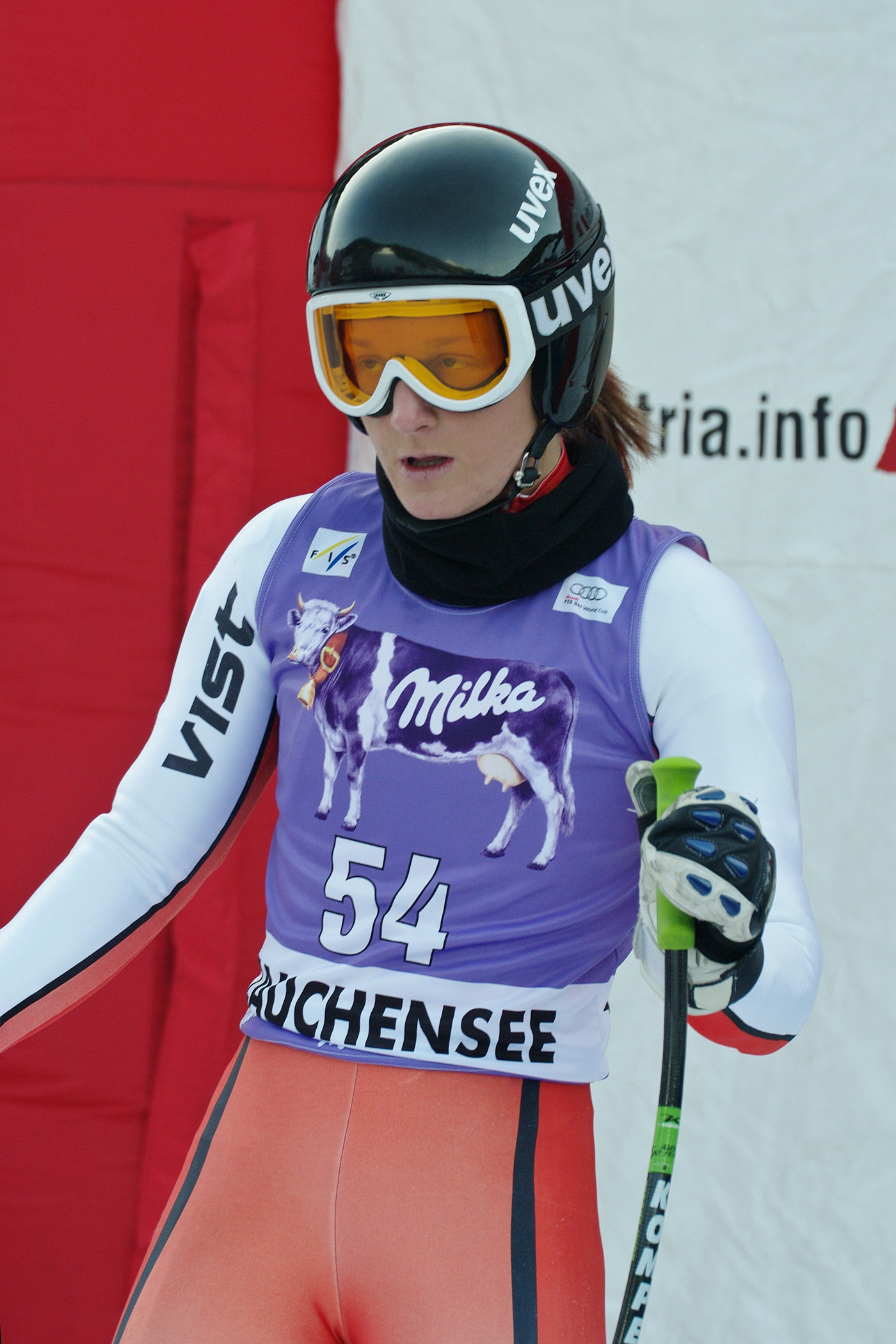
Alexandra Coletti took part in her fourth straight Winter Olympics

The qualification quotas were allocated based on athletes satisfying he criteria laid out by International Ski Federation, subject to a maximum cap per country. Any nation ranked in the top 500 in the rankings as on 21 January 2018 was entitled to send an athlete for that particular event. For nations ranked outside the list, qualification was subject to a maximum accumulated point score as per the event concerned. Monaco qualified two athletes for six alpine skiing events.

While Alexandra Coletti competed in three women's events, Olivier Jenot qualified for three individual men's events respectively. Coletti was the most experienced of the trio, competing in her fourth straight Winter Olympic Games since her debut in 2006. This was the third consecutive Olympic appearance for Jenot after the 2006 Games.

The Alpine skiing events were held in Mount Gariwang. The course for the events was designed by former Olympic champion Bernhard Russi. The weather was cold and windy during the events, resulting in several delays and postponements. Amongst the six entries across events, Jenot registered his best finish in the men's combined event and Coletti registered her best finish in the women's downhill event.

| Athlete | Event | Run 1 | | Run 2 | | Total | |
| Athlete | Event | Time | Rank | Time | Rank | Time | Rank |
|---|---|---|---|---|---|---|---|
| Olivier Jenot | Men's combined | 1:22.71 | 47 | 50.73 | 28 | 2:13.44 | 28 |
| Olivier Jenot | Men's giant slalom | 1:14.93 | 48 | 1:14.16 | 37 | 2:29.09 | 38 |
| Olivier Jenot | Men's super-G | —N/a | | | | 1:28.80 | 38 |
| Alexandra Coletti | Women's super-G | —N/a | | | | 1:24.01 | 30 |
| Alexandra Coletti | Women's combined | DNS | | | | | |
| Alexandra Coletti | Women's downhill | —N/a | | | | 1:45.04 | 27 |

== Bobsleigh ==
As per the International Bobsleigh & Skeleton Federation, a maximum of 170 quota spots (130 men, 40 women) were available for the Games. The qualification was based on the world rankings as on 14 January 2018. The athletes must have competed in five different races on three different tracks during the two previous seasons. Monaco qualified a two-man sled for the event based on the rankings. Rudy Rinaldi and Boris Vain made their debut at the Winter Olympics.

The bobsleigh events were held at the Olympic Sliding Centre at Alpensia. The course was built specifically for the Olympics and hosted the World Cup in March 2017. The track consisted of a 1,376 m (4,514 ft) course with 16 curves. In the contest, the team was ranked 16th after the first three runs. As the top 20 teams made it to the final run, the Monegasque pair entered the final round. However, the pair were classified in 19th amongst the 30 teams with a total time of over three minutes and 19 seconds, over two seconds behind the lead pairs.

| Athlete | Event | Run 1 | | Run 2 | | Run 3 | | Run 4 | | Total | |
| Athlete | Event | Time | Rank | Time | Rank | Time | Rank | Time | Rank | Time | Rank |
|---|---|---|---|---|---|---|---|---|---|---|---|
| Rudy Rinaldi*; Boris Vain | Two-man | 49.85 | 20 | 49.69 | 16 | 49.68 | 19 | 49.80 | 16 | 3:19.02 | 19 |

* – Denotes the driver of each sled

== See also ==
- Monaco at the 2018 Summer Youth Olympics
