= Alpine skiing at the 2014 Winter Olympics – Men's combined =

Men's combined at the XXII Olympic Winter Games
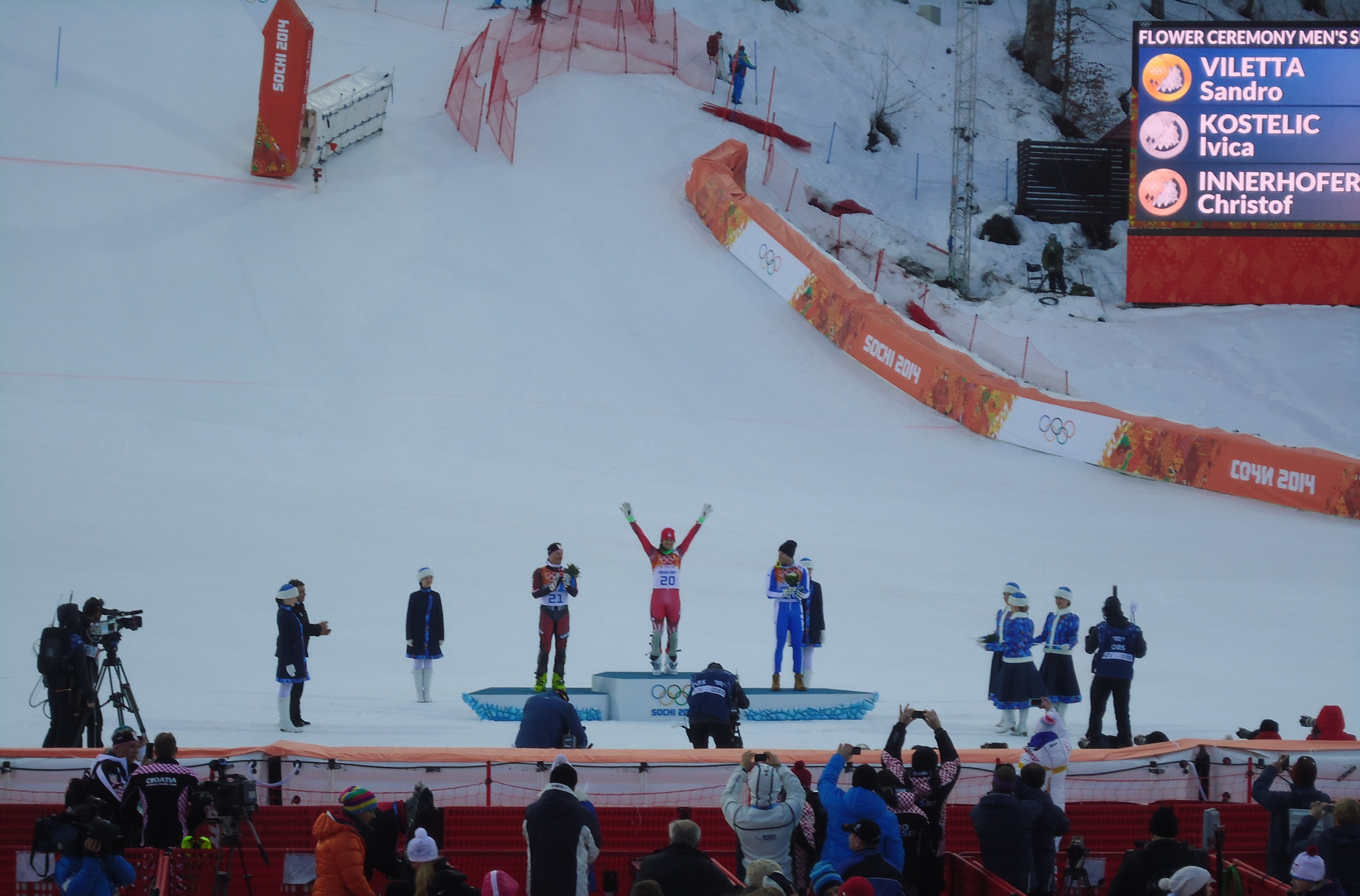
- Flower ceremony Gold medal Sandro Viletta, Switzerland Silver medal Ivica Kostelić, Croatia Bronze medal Christof Innerhofer, Italy
- Venue: Rosa Khutor Alpine Resort; Krasnaya Polyana, Russia
- Date: 14 February 2014
- Competitors: 50 from 35 nations
- Winning time: 2:45.20

Medalists
1st place, gold medalist(s)		Sandro Viletta	Switzerland
2nd place, silver medalist(s)		Ivica Kostelić	Croatia
3rd place, bronze medalist(s)		Christof Innerhofer	Italy

The men's combined competition of the 2014 Winter Olympics in Sochi was held on Friday, 14 February, at Rosa Khutor Alpine Resort near Krasnaya Polyana, Russia.

== Summary ==
The downhill course started at an elevation of 1,947 m (6,388 ft); it was 3.219 km (2.000 mi) in length with a vertical drop of 977 m (3,205 ft). The slalom started at 1,160 m (3,806 ft) with a vertical drop of 200 m (656 ft) and 62 gates.

The downhill was started at 10:00 and the slalom at 15:30. Due to warm temperatures, the downhill was moved up an hour from 11:00, but temperatures were still above freezing in the starting gate. In the afternoon, the temperature at the slalom's starting gate was 11 °C (52 °F).

The gold medalist was Sandro Viletta of Switzerland, who had just one World Cup podium finish, a victory in super-G. Ivica Kostelić of Croatia won the silver medal, already the fourth one in his career (three of them in combined). Christof Innerhofer of Italy, the 2014 downhill silver medalist, won bronze.

== Results ==
The downhill race was started at 11:00 and the slalom race at 15:00.

Rank	Bib	Name	Nation	Downhill	Rank	Slalom	Rank	Total	Behind
1st place, gold medalist(s)	20	Sandro Viletta	Switzerland	1:54.88	14	50.32	2	2:45.20	—
2nd place, silver medalist(s)	21	Ivica Kostelić	Croatia	1:54.17	7	51.37	3	2:45.54	+0.34
3rd place, bronze medalist(s)	10	Christof Innerhofer	Italy	1:54.30	8	51.37	3	2:45.67	+0.47
4	9	Kjetil Jansrud	Norway	1:53.24	1	53.02	13	2:46.26	+1.06
5	2	Adam Žampa	Slovakia	1:56.23	27	50.11	1	2:46.34	+1.14
6	24	Bode Miller	United States	1:54.67	12	51.93	7	2:46.60	+1.40
7	4	Ondřej Bank	Czech Republic	1:53.38	2	53.46	16	2:46.84	+1.64
8	16	Carlo Janka	Switzerland	1:54.42	9	52.46	11	2:46.88	+1.68
8	12	Aksel Lund Svindal	Norway	1:53.94	6	52.94	12	2:46.88	+1.68
10	18	Natko Zrnčić-Dim	Croatia	1:55.26	19	51.80	6	2:47.06	+1.86
11	28	Jared Goldberg	United States	1:54.90	15	52.39	10	2:47.29	+2.09
12	22	Ted Ligety	United States	1:55.17	18	52.22	8	2:47.39	+2.19
13	14	Matthias Mayer	Austria	1:53.61	3	53.85	20	2:47.46	+2.26
14	13	Romed Baumann	Austria	1:55.36	21	52.23	9	2:47.59	+2.39
15	8	Beat Feuz	Switzerland	1:54.46	10	53.29	15	2:47.75	+2.55
16	6	Martin Vráblík	Czech Republic	1:56.36	29	51.56	5	2:47.92	+2.72
17	26	Adrien Théaux	France	1:55.00	17	53.66	17	2:48.66	+3.46
18	25	Dominik Paris	Italy	1:54.46	10	54.99	22	2:49.45	+4.25
19	30	Kryštof Krýzl	Czech Republic	1:56.68	32	53.21	14	2:49.89	+4.69
20	27	Morgan Pridy	Canada	1:56.21	25	53.82	19	2:50.03	+4.83
21	40	Otmar Striedinger	Austria	1:55.48	22	54.98	21	2:50.46	+5.26
22	37	Paul de la Cuesta	Spain	1:56.22	26	55.84	23	2:52.06	+6.86
23	39	Nikola Chongarov	Bulgaria	1:58.68	41	53.73	18	2:52.41	+7.21
24	32	Pavel Trikhichev	Russia	1:56.65	31	56.64	28	2:53.29	+8.09
25	34	Ferran Terra	Spain	1:57.23	34	56.31	26	2:53.54	+8.34
26	42	Igor Zakurdayev	Kazakhstan	1:57.62	37	57.02	29	2:54.64	+9.44
27	44	Igor Laikert	Bosnia and Herzegovina	1:59.76	44	55.94	24	2:55.70	+10.50
28	33	Olivier Jenot	Monaco	1:59.81	45	56.01	25	2:55.82	+10.62
29	31	Cristian Javier Simari Birkner	Argentina	1:59.63	43	56.46	27	2:56.09	+10.89
30	3	Aleksandr Khoroshilov	Russia	1:56.03	24	1:02.43	33	2:58.46	+13.26
31	46	Marc Oliveras	Andorra	1:57.08	33	1:01.46	32	2:58.54	+13.34
32	47	Henrik von Appen	Chile	1:58.49	40	1:00.42	30	2:58.91	+13.71
33	36	Martin Khuber	Kazakhstan	1:59.42	42	1:00.44	31	2:59.86	+14.66
34	49	Christoffer Faarup	Denmark	1:57.96	39	1:10.36	34	3:08.32	+23.12
	29	Klemen Kosi	Slovenia	1:56.41	30	DSQ	DSQ	DSQ	DSQ
	1	Aleksander Aamodt Kilde	Norway	1:53.85	4	DNF	—N/a		
	5	Max Franz	Austria	1:53.93	5	DNF	—N/a		
	7	Maciej Bydliński	Poland	1:57.36	35	DNF	—N/a		
	11	Mauro Caviezel	Switzerland	1:54.75	13	DNF	—N/a		
	15	Peter Fill	Italy	1:54.98	16	DNF	—N/a		
	17	Alexis Pinturault	France	1:55.68	23	DNF	—N/a		
	19	Thomas Mermillod-Blondin	France	1:56.23	27	DNF	—N/a		
	23	Andrew Weibrecht	United States	1:55.33	20	DNF	—N/a		
	38	Jorge Birkner Ketelhohn	Argentina	2:01.05	46	DNF	—N/a		
	43	Georgi Georgiev	Bulgaria	1:57.69	38	DNF	—N/a		
	45	Arnaud Alessandria	Monaco	1:57.59	36	DNF	—N/a		
	35	Matej Falat	Slovakia	DNF	—N/a				
	41	Yuri Danilochkin	Belarus	DNF	—N/a				
	48	Martin Bendík	Slovakia	DNF	—N/a				
	50	Ioan Valeriu Achiriloaie	Romania	DNF	—N/a				
