= Angélique Trinquier =

Monégasque Olympic swimmer (born 1991)

Angélique Trinquier OLY
Personal information
- Born: 16 July 1991 (age 35) La Colle, Monaco

Sport
- Sport: Swimming
Medal record
Games of the Small States of Europe
Bronze medal – third place	2011 Liechtenstein	4x200 m freestyle

Angélique Trinquier (born 16 July 1991) is a Monégasque Olympic swimmer affiliated with ASM Natation. She competed in the women's 100 metre backstroke at the 2012 Summer Olympics in London, finishing 45th in the heats and not advancing to the semifinals. At those Games she was Monaco's flag bearer in the Opening Ceremony, becoming the youngest member of the Monégasque team. Trinquier also represented Monaco at the 2010 Summer Youth Olympics, where she placed 47th in the girls' 100 metre freestyle event.

== Career ==
Trinquier took up swimming with ASM Natation at an early age and progressed through its developmental programme to reach the international stage. She has described her training environment as mixed-gender and mutually encouraging, with only light-hearted teasing and no lasting disadvantages linked to gender. Reflecting on women's sport, Trinquier observes that although women were first admitted to the Olympic Games in 1912 as just 2 percent of competitors and confined to two sports, modern female swimmers now enjoy prestige equivalent to their male peers.

Following her competitive career, Trinquier turned to coaching and today teaches swimming in Monaco's primary and secondary schools. She emphasises the Olympic values of excellence, respect and friendship in her instruction and advises aspiring young athletes—especially girls—to trust their own judgement and embrace sport as a means of personal and social development.

At the London Games she achieved a new personal best of 1 min 10.79 s in the women's 100 m backstroke heats, competing before approximately 17,500 spectators at the Olympic Aquatics Centre. Upon exiting the pool she was congratulated by Prince Albert II and Princess Charlène, and later admitted that the enormity of the crowd had "blocked" her performance slightly.

Olympic Games
Preceded by Mathias Raymond	Flagbearer for Monaco; London 2012	Succeeded by Yann Siccardi
