= Monaco at the 2022 Winter Olympics =

- Flag of Monaco
- IOC code: MON
- NOC: Monégasque Olympic Committee
- Website: www.comite-olympique.mc

in Beijing, China 4–20 February 2022
- Competitors: 3 (3 men and 0 women) in 2 sports
- Flag bearer (opening): Arnaud Alessandria
- Flag bearer (closing): Volunteer
- Medals: Gold 0 Silver 0 Bronze 0 Total 0

Winter Olympics appearances (overview)
- 1984; 1988; 1992; 1994; 1998; 2002; 2006; 2010; 2014; 2018; 2022; 2026

Monaco participated in the 2022 Winter Olympics in Beijing, China held between 4 and 20 February 2022. The country's participation in the Games marked its eleventh appearance at the Winter Olympics since its debut in the 1984 Games.

The Monaco team consisted of three athletes who competed across two sports. Arnaud Alessandria served as the country's flag-bearer during the opening ceremony and a Games volunteer served as the flag-bearer during the closing ceremony. Monaco did not win any medal in the Games, and has not won a Winter Olympics medal as of these Games.

== Background ==
Monaco first participated in Olympic competition at the 1920 Antwerp Olympics, and have participated in most Summer Olympic Games since. The Comité Olympique Monégasque (the National Olympic Committee (NOC) of Monaco) was recognised by the International Olympic Committee on 1 January 1953. The 1984 Winter Olympics marked Monaco's first participation in the Winter Olympics. After the nation made its debut in the 1984 Games, this edition of the Games in 2022 marked the nation's eleventh appearance at the Winter Games.

The 2022 Winter Olympics was held in Beijing held between 4 and 20 February 2022. The Monegasque team consisted of three athletes who competed across two sports. Arnaud Alessandria served as the country's flag-bearer during the opening ceremony. A Games volunteer carried the national flag during the closing ceremony. Monaco did not win any medal in the Games, and has not won a Winter Olympics medal as of these Games.

== Competitors ==
Monaco sent three athletes who competed in two sports at the Games.

Sport	Men	Women	Total
Alpine skiing	1	0	1
Bobsleigh	2	0	2
Total	3	0	3

== Alpine skiing ==
The qualification quotas were allocated based on athletes satisfying he criteria laid out by International Ski Federation (FIS), subject to a maximum cap per country. The individual athletes were allocated points based on their finishes in FIS events from 1 July 2019, to 16 January 2022. The points tally for the final list was calculated by taking the average of two best results for the speed events (downhill, super G, and super combined). An athlete was eligible if he/she had a point average of less than 80 for downhill and super-G, and 160 for the combined event. Monaco qualified one male athlete for the alpine skiing events.

Arnaud Alessandria competed in three men's events. This was Alessandria's second Winter Olympics after his debut in the 2014 Winter Olympics. The Alpine skiing events were held at the National Alpine Ski Centre in Yanqing District. The Men's combined events took place on the rock and ice river courses on 10 February. Alessandria set a combined time of just over two minutes and 44 seconds to be ranked 13th amongst the 27 participants. He finished 29th and 31st in the downhill and super-G events respectively.

Athlete	Event	Run 1		Run 2		Total	
Athlete	Event	Time	Rank	Time	Rank	Time	Rank
Arnaud Alessandria	Men's combined	1:45.79	15	58.41	16	2:44.20	13
Arnaud Alessandria	Men's downhill	—N/a				1:46.25	29
Arnaud Alessandria	Men's super-G	—N/a				1:24.68	31

== Bobsleigh ==
As per the International Bobsleigh & Skeleton Federation, a maximum of 170 quota spots (130 men, 40 women) were available for the Games. The qualification was based on the world rankings as on 16 January 2022. The athletes must have competed in five different races on three different tracks during the two previous seasons. Based on their rankings in the 2021–22 Bobsleigh World Cup, Monaco qualified one sled in the two-man event.

This was the second consecutive Winter Olympics appearance for the team of Rudy Rinaldi and Boris Vain, who made their debut at the 2018 Winter Olympics. The Monegasque team finished in sixth place, the highest finish for the country at the Olympics.

Athlete	Event	Run 1		Run 2		Run 3		Run 4		Total	
Athlete	Event	Time	Rank	Time	Rank	Time	Rank	Time	Rank	Time	Rank
Rudy Rinaldi*; Boris Vain	Two-man	59.62	9	59.90	3	59.57	4	1:00.05	10	3:59.14	6

* – Denotes the driver of each sled
