= Monaco at the 1984 Winter Olympics =

- IOC code: MON
- NOC: Comité Olympique Monégasque
- Website: www.comite-olympique.mc (in French)

in Sarajevo
- Competitors: 1 (man) in 1 sport
- Flag bearer: David Lajoux
- Medals: Gold 0 Silver 0 Bronze 0 Total 0

Winter Olympics appearances (overview)
- 1984; 1988; 1992; 1994; 1998; 2002; 2006; 2010; 2014; 2018; 2022; 2026

Monaco sent a delegation to compete in the 1984 Winter Olympics in Sarajevo, Yugoslavia from 8–19 February 1984. This was the first time the principality had participated in a Winter Olympic Games, The Monégasque delegation consisted of a single alpine skier, David Lajoux. He failed to finish the men's slalom, and came in 47th place in the men's downhill.

== Background ==
Monaco first participated in Olympic competition at the 1920 Antwerp Olympics, and have participated in most Summer Olympic Games since. The Comité Olympique Monégasque (the National Olympic Committee (NOC) of Monaco) was not recognised by the International Olympic Committee until 1 January 1953. Despite their history of Olympic participation, these Sarajevo Olympics were the principality's first time entering a Winter Olympic Games. The 1984 Winter Olympics were held in Sarajevo, Yugoslavia from 8–19 February 1984; a total of 1,272 athletes represented 49 NOCs. Monaco sent a single athlete to Sarajevo, alpine skier David Lajoux, who was chosen as the flag-bearer for the opening ceremony.

== Alpine skiing ==
David Lajoux was 17 years old at the time of the Sarajevo Olympics, and he was making his only Olympic appearance. On 16 February he participated in the single-run men's downhill race, and finished with a time of 1 minute and 56.95 seconds, which put him in 47th place out of 60 competitors who finished the event. The gold medal was won by Bill Johnson of the United States in a time of 1 minute and 45.59 seconds; the silver medal was won by Peter Müller of Switzerland, and the bronze was earned by Anton Steiner of Austria. Three days later, he took part in the men's slalom, but failed to finish the first leg of the two-leg race. The gold and silver medals were won by American twins Phil Mahre and Steve Mahre respectively, with the bronze medal going to Didier Bouvet of France.

Athlete	Event	Race 1		Race 2		Total	
Athlete	Event	Time	Rank	Time	Rank	Time	Rank
David Lajoux	Men's downhill	N/A				1:56.95	47
David Lajoux	Men's slalom	DNF		–			

== See also ==
- Monaco at the 1984 Summer Olympics
