= Monaco at the 1988 Winter Olympics =

- IOC code: MON
- NOC: Comité Olympique Monégasque
- Website: www.comite-olympique.mc (in French)

in Calgary
- Competitors: 3 (men) in 2 sports
- Flag bearer: Albert Grimaldi
- Medals: Gold 0 Silver 0 Bronze 0 Total 0

Winter Olympics appearances (overview)
- 1984; 1988; 1992; 1994; 1998; 2002; 2006; 2010; 2014; 2018; 2022; 2026

Monaco participated at the 1988 Winter Olympics in Calgary, Canada, held between 13 and 28 February 1988. The country's participation in the Games marked its second appearance at the Winter Olympics since its debut in the previous Games. The Monaco team consisted of three athletes who competed across two events. Albert Grimaldi served as the country's flag-bearer during the opening ceremony. Monaco had not won a Winter Olympics medal as of the Games, and did not win any medal in the current Games.

== Background ==
Monaco first participated in Olympic competition at the 1920 Antwerp Olympics, and have participated in most Summer Olympic Games since. The Comité Olympique Monégasque (the National Olympic Committee (NOC) of Monaco) was recognised by the International Olympic Committee on 1 January 1953. The 1984 Winter Olympics marked Monaco's first participation in the Winter Olympics. After the nation made its debut in the previous Games, this edition of the Games in 1988 marked the nation's second consecutive appearance at the Winter Games.

The 1988 Winter Olympics was held in Calgary, Canada, between 13 and 28 February 1988. The Monaco team consisted of three athletes who competed across two events. Albert Grimaldi served as the country's flag-bearer during the opening ceremony. Monaco had not won a Winter Olympics medal as of the Games, and did not win any medal in the current Games.

== Competitors ==
Monaco sent three athletes who competed in two sports at the Games.

Sport	Men	Women	Total
Alpine skiing	1	0	1
Bobsleigh	2	0	2
Total	3	0	3

== Alpine skiing ==
Alpine skiing competitions were held at Nakiska in Alberta. Fabrice Notari participated in two events in the competition. Born in 1958, Notari made his debut and only participation in the Winter Olympics in the 1998 Games. In the men's super-G event at the Games, he crossed the 2,327 m (7,635 ft) course in just over two minutes and 11 seconds to finish 54th amongst the 57 finishers. In the giant slalom event, he clocked 1:27.14 in the first run and did slightly better with a time of 1:25.01 in the second run. He finished 64th with a combined time of over two minutes and 52 seconds.

Athlete	Event	Record	Rank
Fabrice Notari	Men's giant slalom	2:52.15	64
Fabrice Notari	Men's super-G	2:11.73	54

== Bobsleigh ==
Bobsleigh competitions were held at the Olympic Park in Calgary. Albert Grimaldi and Gilbert Bessi represented Monaco in the two-man event. Grimaldi was the son of Rainier III, then prince of Monaco. The 1988 Games marked his debut in the Winter Olympics, and he would go on to represent the nation four more times in the future Winter Games. He served in the navy earlier, and became the prince of Monaco in 2005. Born in 1958, Bessi also made his Olympics debut in the competition. He would go on to participate in four further Olympic Games including the 1988 Summer Olympics in athletics.

In the event at the Games, the pair clocked a time of 58.48 over the 1,475 m (4,839 ft) course in their first run to be ranked 17th. However, the team recorded one minute plus lap times in the next three runs to drop down the classification. With a combined time of over four minutes and two seconds, the pair finished 25th amongst the 38 finishers, nearly ten seconds behind the leaders.

Athlete	Event	Record	Rank
Albert Grimaldi; Gilbert Bessi	Two-man	4:02.47	25
