= Olivier Jenot =

Monegasque alpine skier

Olivier Jenot OLY
Personal information
- Born: 28 February 1988 (age 38) Monaco
Medal record
Alpine skiing
Representing Monaco
Winter Universiade
Gold medal – first place	2013 Trentino	Combined

Olivier Jenot (born 28 February 1988 in Monaco) is an alpine skier from Monaco. He competed for Monaco at the 2014 Winter Olympics in four alpine skiing events. Jenot was also selected to carry the Monégasque flag during the opening ceremony.

== 2006 Winter Olympics ==
Jenot made his Olympic debut as an 18-year-old at the 2006 Winter Olympics in Turin, Italy. Jenot finished in 48th place in the super-G, 34th in the slalom, and did not finish the giant slalom. Jenot also qualified for the 2010 Winter Olympics in Vancouver, Canada, but dislocated his shoulder and broke his tuberosity bone near the humerus. This meant he could not compete at the Games.

== World championships ==
Jenot competed at the FIS Alpine World Ski Championships in slalom and giant slalom in 2011 and 2013. In 2011 he finished 34th in the slalom and 44th in the giant slalom. In 2013 he did not finish the slalom and scored another 44th place in the giant slalom.

== 2013 Winter Universiade ==
Jenot who was Monaco's only representative, won gold in the combined race at the 2013 Winter Universiade in Trentino, Italy. By doing so he became the first athlete from Monaco to ever win a Universiade medal.

== 2014 Winter Olympics ==
At the 2014 Winter Olympics Jenot finished 28th in the combined, 35th in the super-G, and failed to finish in the slalom and giant slalom.

== 2017 Alpine World Ski Championships ==
The former gold medallist lost balance before turning midair and landing heavily on his back. The skier received immediate medical attention for internal bleeding and a punctured lung. The 28-year-old was lifted via a helicopter to a hospital in Chur where he was later confirmed as being in a stable condition.

== 2018 Winter Olympics ==
At the 2018 Winter Olympics Jenot finished 28th in the combined

== See also ==
- Monaco at the 2006 Winter Olympics
- Monaco at the 2014 Winter Olympics

Olympic Games
Preceded by Alexandra Coletti	Flagbearer for Monaco; Sochi 2014	Succeeded by TBD
