= Sébastien Bottin =

French statistician and politician (1764–1853)

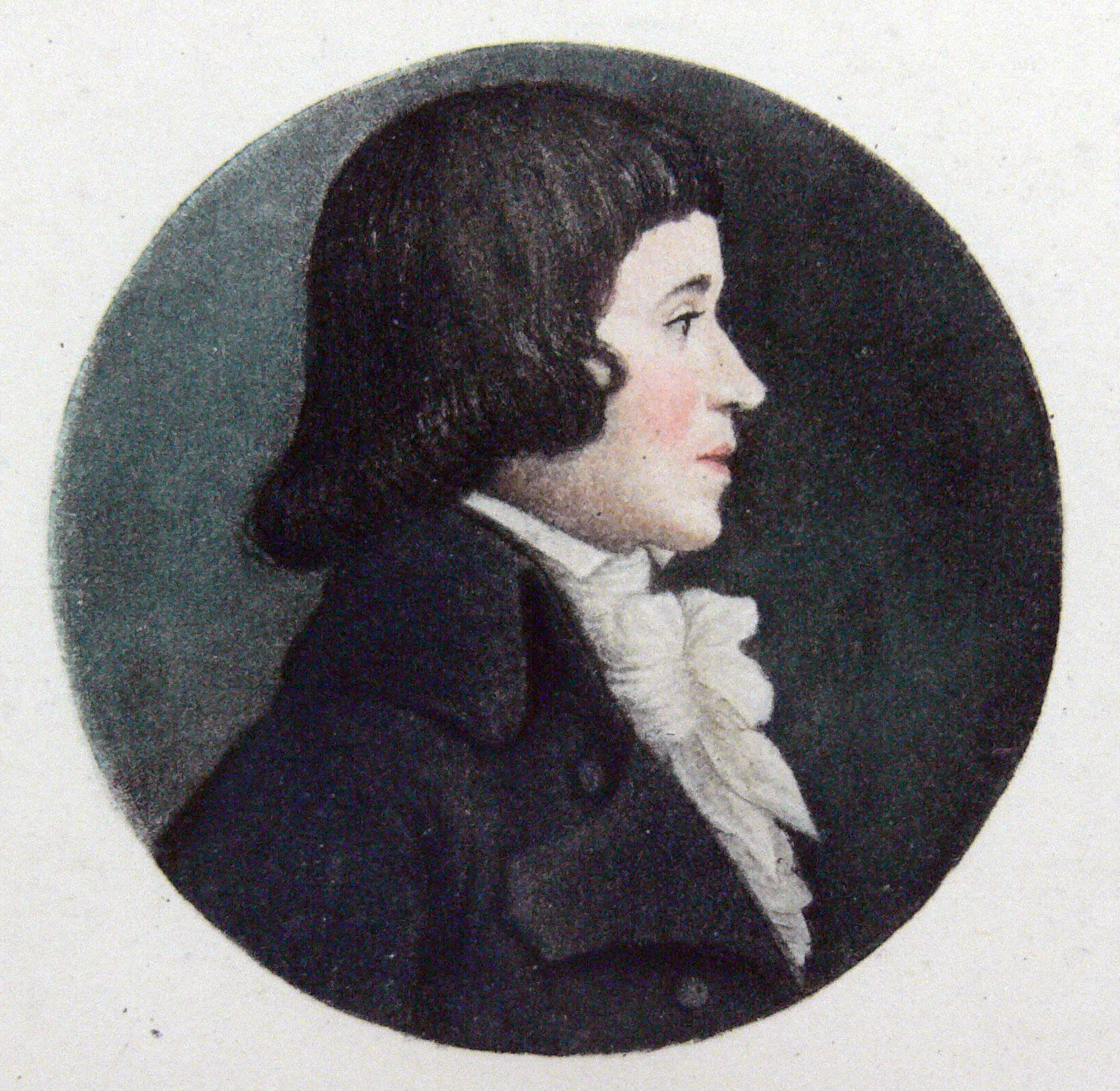
- Sébastien Bottin in 1790
- Born: 17 December 1764; Grimonviller, Meurthe, France
- Died: 28 March 1853 (aged 88); Paris, France
- Resting place: Père Lachaise Cemetery
- Occupation: Statistician

Sébastien Bottin (1764–1853) was a French statistician and politician.

== Early life ==
Sébastien Bottin was born on 17 December 1764 in Grimonviller, Meurthe, France.

== Career ==
Bottin served as a member of the Chamber of Representatives during the Hundred Days from 11 May 1815 to 13 July 1815, representing Nord.

Bottin was the editor of the Almanach du commerce de Paris, founded by Jean de La Tynna.

Bottin was also the co-founder of the Société libre des Sciences et Arts de Strasbourg in 1799. He became a Knight of the Legion of Honour on 30 July 1814. He became a member of the Société des Antiquaires de France on 28 February 1818. He was awarded and honored by a prize in statistics from the Académie des Sciences in 1824, and received the honorary medal from the Société française de statistique universelle in 1833.

== Death and legacy ==
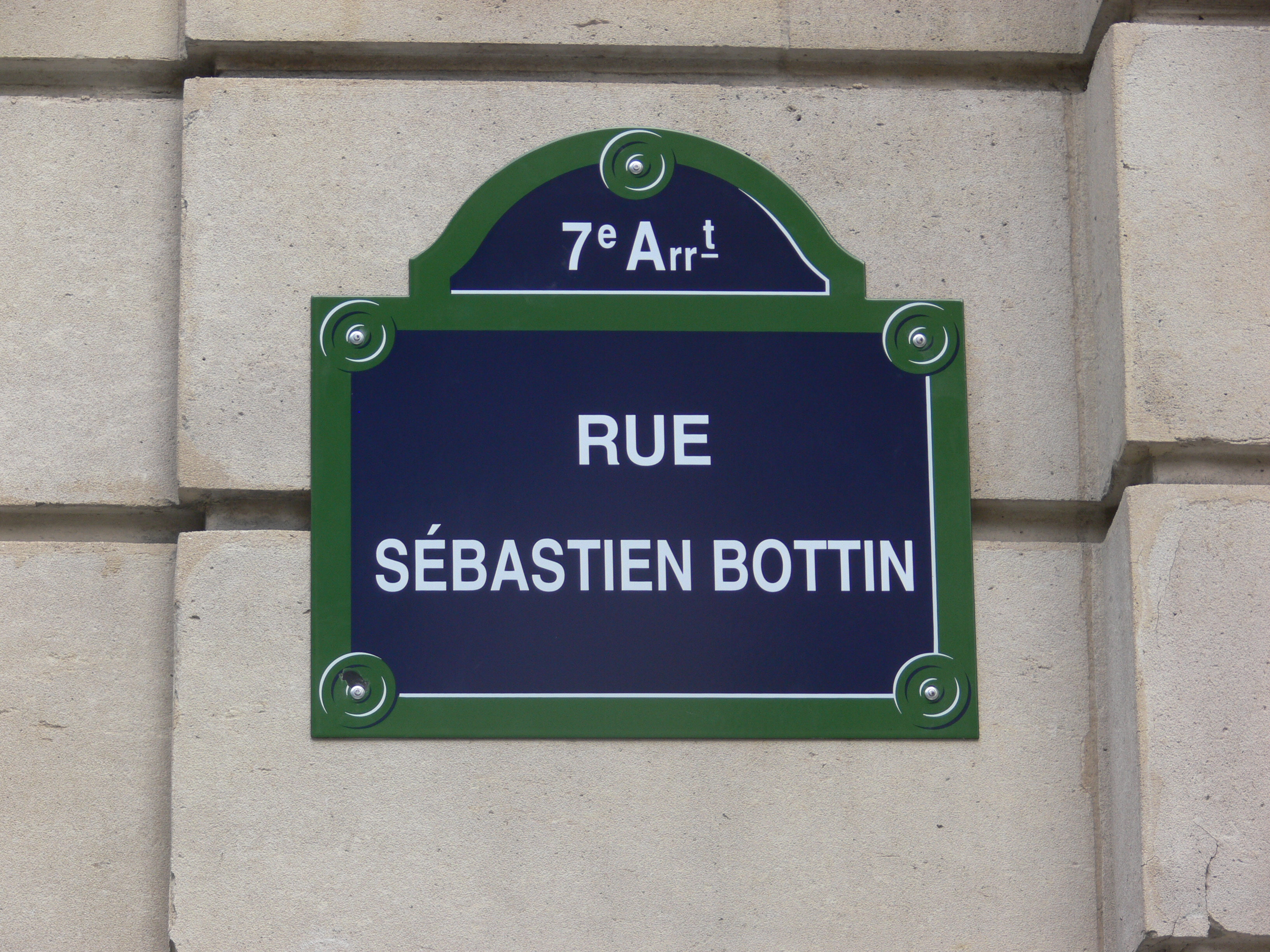
Rue Sébastien Bottin.

Bottin died on 28 March 1853 in Paris, France. He was buried at the Père Lachaise Cemetery. The Rue Sébastien Bottin in the 7th arrondissement of Paris was named in his honor in 1929. His surname, bottin, is also a colloquial French term for a telephone directory.
