= Mathias Raymond =

Monégasque Olympic rower (born 1986)

Personal information
- Nationality: Monégasque
- Born: 13 January 1986 (age 40) La Colle, Monaco

Sport
- Sport: Rower

Mathias Raymond (born 13 January 1986 in La Colle, Monaco) is a Monégasque Olympic rower. He competed in the 2008, and the 2012 Summer Olympics. At the 2008 Summer Olympics he was Monaco's flag bearer during the Opening Ceremony.

Olympic Games
Preceded by Sébastien Gattuso	Flagbearer for Monaco; Beijing 2008	Succeeded by Angélique Trinquier
