= Sandro Viletta =

Swiss alpine skier (born 1986)

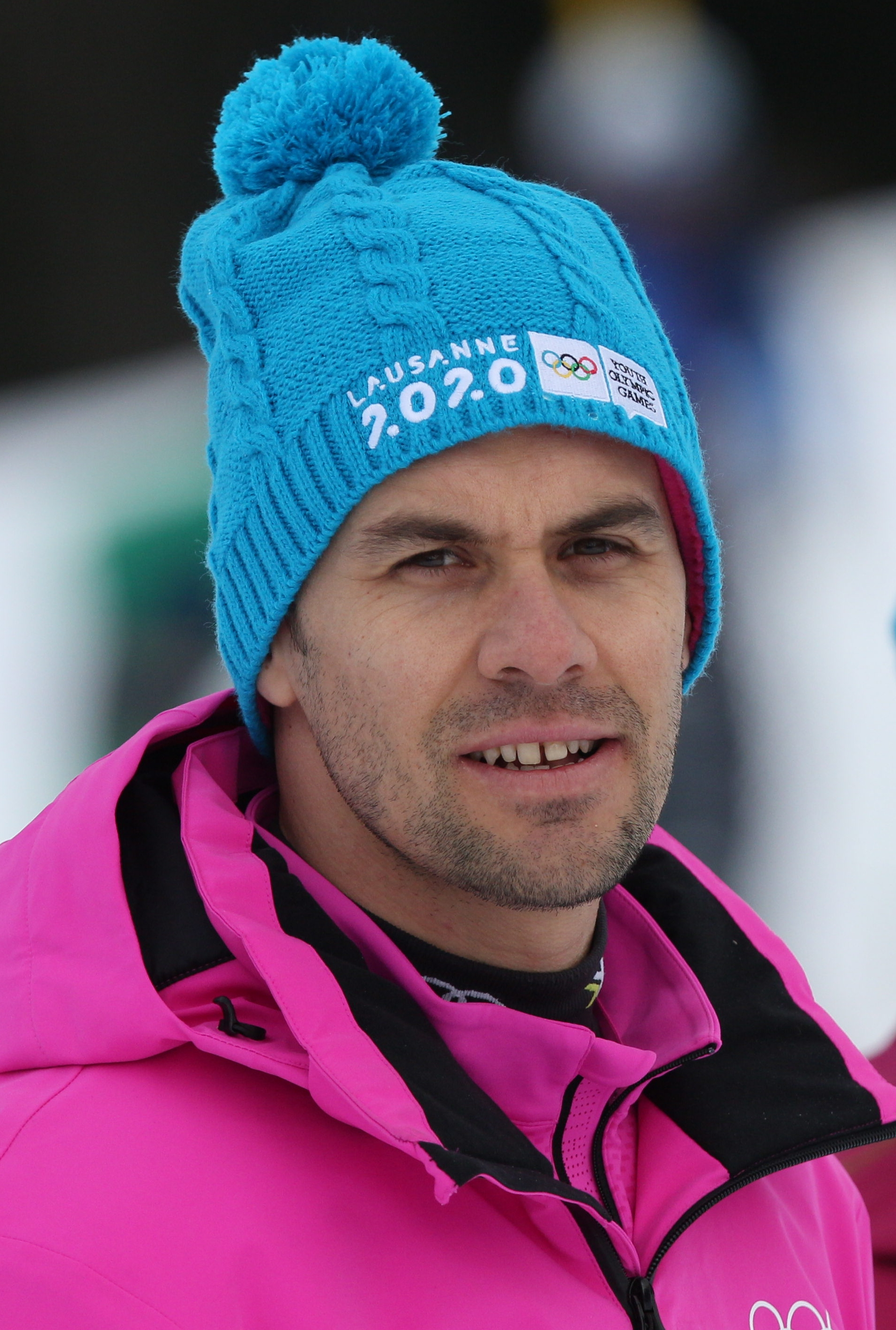

Personal information
- Born: 23 January 1986 (age 40) Graubünden, Switzerland
- Height: 178 cm (5 ft 10 in)
- Website: sandroviletta.ch

Skiing career
- Sport: Alpine skiing
- Club: La Punt Chamues-ch
- Retired: 2018
- Disciplines: Super G, Combined
- World Cup debut: 12 November 2006 (age 20)

Olympics
- Teams: 2 – (2010, 2014)
- Medals: 1 (1 gold)

World Championships
- Teams: 3 – (2009, 2011, 2013)
- Medals: 0

World Cup
- Seasons: 7th – (2008–14)
- Wins: 1 – (1 SG)
- Podiums: 1 – (1 SG)
- Overall titles: 0 – (45th in 2015)
- Discipline titles: 0 – (4th in SC, 2014)
Medal record
Men's alpine skiing
Representing Switzerland
Olympic Games
Gold medal – first place	2014 Sochi	Combined
Junior World Championships
Bronze medal – third place	2006 Quebec	Slalom

Sandro Viletta (born 23 January 1986) is a Swiss former World Cup alpine ski racer and Olympic gold medalist.

From the village of La Punt Chamues-ch, near St. Moritz in the canton of Graubünden, he made his World Cup debut in November 2006 and won his first race in December 2011. Viletta competed at the 2010 Winter Olympics in Vancouver and at the World Championships in 2009, 2011 and 2013. He won the super combined at the 2014 Olympics in Sochi.

Viletta stopped competing after knee injuries in 2016, unable to defend his Olympic title, and retired in 2018.

== World Cup results ==
=== Race victories ===
- 2 wins – (1 SG, 1 SC)

Date	Competition	Location	Discipline
3 Dec 2011	2012 Alpine Skiing World Cup	(United States) Beaver Creek, USA	Super G
14 Feb 2014	2014 Winter Olympics	Sochi, Russia	Super combined

=== Season standings ===
Season	Age	Overall	Slalom	Giant Slalom	Super G	Downhill	Combined
2007	21	113	44	–	–	–	—
2008	22	186	33	50	–	–	—
2009	23	53	44	28	–	–	14
2010	24	53	–	16	–	–	15
2011	25	67	–	23	33	–	33
2012	26	57	–	47	18	–	30
2013	27	85	–	–	34	–	14
2014	28	47	–	–	36	33	4
2015	29	45	–	–	29	23	14
2016	30	122	–	–	39	–	–
