= Monaco at the 2026 Winter Olympics =

- Flag of Monaco
- IOC code: MON
- NOC: Monégasque Olympic Committee
- Website: www.comite-olympique.mc

in Milan and Cortina d'Ampezzo, Italy 6 February 2026 – 22 February 2026
- Competitors: 1 (1 man) in 1 sport
- Flag bearer (opening): Volunteer
- Flag bearer (closing): Volunteer
- Medals: Gold 0 Silver 0 Bronze 0 Total 0

Winter Olympics appearances (overview)
- 1984; 1988; 1992; 1994; 1998; 2002; 2006; 2010; 2014; 2018; 2022; 2026

Monaco competed at the 2026 Winter Olympics in Milan and Cortina d'Ampezzo, Italy, from 6 to 22 February 2026. The country's participation in the Games marked its twelfth appearance at the Winter Olympics since its debut in the 1984 Games.

The Monégasque team consisted of one male alpine skier. A volunteer carried the country's flag during the opening ceremony. Meanwhile, a volunteer was the country's flagbearer during the closing ceremony.

== Competitors ==
The following is the list of number of competitors participating at the Games per sport/discipline.

| Sport | Men | Women | Total |
|---|---|---|---|
| Alpine skiing | 1 | 0 | 1 |
| Total | 1 | 0 | 1 |

== Alpine skiing ==
Monaco qualified one male alpine skier through the basic quota.

Men

| Athlete | Event | Total | |
| Athlete | Event | Time | Rank |
|---|---|---|---|
| Arnaud Alessandria | Downhill | 1:57.15 | 31 |
| Arnaud Alessandria | Super-G | 1:30.13 | 30 |
