= Charles Oula =

Monegasque bobsledder (born 1973)

Personal information
- Nationality: Monegasque
- Born: 12 January 1973 (age 52); Abidjan, Côte d'Ivoire

Sport
- Sport: Bobsleigh

Charles Oula (born 12 January 1973) is a Monegasque bobsledder. He competed in the four man event at the 2002 Winter Olympics.
