= Michel Vatrican =

Monegasque bobsledder (born 1969)

Personal information
- Nationality: Monegasque
- Born: 16 July 1969 (age 55); Monte Carlo, Monaco

Sport
- Sport: Bobsleigh

Michel Vatrican (born 16 July 1969) is a Monegasque bobsledder. He competed in the two man and the four man events at the 1992 Winter Olympics.
