= Grimonviller =

- Commune
- Coat of arms
- Location of Grimonviller
- Location within France Location within Grand Est
- Coordinates: 48°23′10″N 6°00′27″E
- Country: France
- Region: Grand Est
- Department: Meurthe-et-Moselle
- Arrondissement: Toul
- Canton: Meine au Saintois
- Intercommunality: CC Pays de Colombey et Sud Toulois

Government
  - Mayor (2020–2026): Régis Barbier
- Area^{1}: 4.78 km^{2} (1.85 sq mi)
- Elevation: 370 m (1,210 ft)
- Highest elevation: 495 m (1,624 ft)
- Lowest elevation: 337 m (1,106 ft)
- Population (2023): 116
  - Density: 24.3/km^{2} (62.9/sq mi)
- Time zone: UTC+01:00 (CET)
  - Summer (DST): UTC+02:00 (CEST)
- INSEE/Postal code: 54237 /54115
- ^{1} French Land Register data, which excludes lakes, ponds, glaciers > 1 km^{2} (0.386 sq mi or 247 acres) and river estuaries.

Grimonviller (French pronunciation: [ɡʁimɔ̃vile]) is a commune in the Meurthe-et-Moselle department in north-eastern France.

== See also ==
- Communes of the Meurthe-et-Moselle department
