= Julien Castellini =

Monegasque alpine skier (born 1975)

Personal information
- Nationality: Monegasque
- Born: 3 July 1975 (age 49); Nice, France

Sport
- Sport: Alpine skiing

Julien Castellini (born 3 July 1975) is a Monegasque alpine skier. He competed in the men's super-G at the 1994 Winter Olympics.
