= David Tomatis =

Monegasque bobsledder (born 1962)

Personal information
- Nationality: Monegasque
- Born: 3 February 1962 (age 63); Berbérati, Central African Republic

Sport
- Sport: Bobsleigh

David Tomatis (born 3 February 1962) is a Monegasque bobsledder. He competed in the four man event at the 1992 Winter Olympics. In 2010, Tomatis became the Executive Director of the Fédération Monégasque de Bobsleigh. David has one son named Andrea Marc, born in December 1997.
