= Arnaud Alessandria =

Monegasque alpine skier (born 1993)

Personal information
- Born: 15 July 1993 (age 33) Monaco

Skiing career
- Sport: Alpine skiing
- World Cup debut: 17 January 2014 (age 20)

Olympics
- Teams: 3 – (2014, 2022, 2026)
- Medals: 0

World Championships
- Teams: 4 – (2015, 2019–2023)
- Medals: 0

World Cup
- Seasons: 8 – (2014–2016, 2018–2019, 2022–2024)
- Podiums: 0

Arnaud Alessandria (born 15 July 1993 in Monaco) is an alpine skier from Monaco. He competed for Monaco at the 2014 Winter Olympics in all the alpine skiing events except the slalom.

After missing the 2018 Winter Olympics, Alessandria was named to Monaco's 2022 Winter Olympic team, where he was also the opening ceremony flagbearer.

At the 2026 Winter Olympics, he was the only athlete on Monaco's team.

== World Championship results ==
Year
Year	Age	Slalom	Giant slalom	Super-G	Downhill	Combined	Parallel
2015	21	—	—	37	39	34	—N/a
2019	25	—	—	DSQ	—	—	—N/a
2021	27	—	—	DNF	28	DNS2	—
2023	29	—	—	DNF	—	20	—N/a

== Olympic results ==
Year
Year	Age	Slalom	Giant slalom	Super-G	Downhill	Combined
2014	20	—	—	DNF1	39	DNF2
2022	28	—	—	31	29	13
2026	32	—	—	30	31	—N/a
