= David Lajoux =

Monegasque alpine skier (born 1966)

Personal information
- Nationality: Monegasque
- Born: 3 July 1966 (age 58)

Sport
- Sport: Alpine skiing

David Lajoux (born 3 July 1966) is a Monegasque alpine skier. He competed in two events at the 1984 Winter Olympics.
