= Sébastien Gattuso =

Monegasque sprinter

Sébastien Gattuso OLY
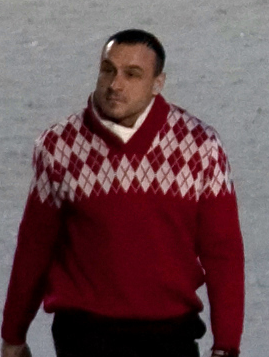
- Gattuso at the 2014 Winter Olympics

Personal information
- Born: 28 June 1971 (age 55) Menton, France

Sport
- Country: Monaco
- Sport: Bobsleigh

Sébastien Gattuso (born 28 June 1971) is a Monégasque Olympic bobsledder who has competed in the 2002, and the 2010, and the 2014 Winter Olympics. He also competed in the 2004 and 2008 Summer Olympics where he ran the 100 meters.

== Career ==
=== Bobsleigh ===
He finished 4th with Patrice Servelle (two-man) at the FIBT World Championships 2004, a national record still unbroken (2024).

He also competed at the 2002 European Championships, the 2003 World Championships, the 2003 World Indoor Championships and the 2007 European Indoor Championships without reaching the final.

In October 2005, he was banned for six months after testing positive for finasteride (drug banned by the World Anti-Doping Agency from 2005 to 2009), a drug that can be used to mask the use of steroids and had been banned for 10 months. He argued he had been a therapeutic user for the past four years, to no avail. As a consequence, he could not compete in the 2006 Winter Olympics in Turin.

Gattuso also competed in bobsleigh in two Winter Olympics, earning his best finish of 19th in the two-man event at Vancouver in 2010. The best World Cup finish for Gattuso was sixth in a two-man event at Cesana Pariol in 2007.

He bobsleighed for Monaco during the 2014 Winter Olympics in Sotchi.

=== Athletics ===
Participating in the 2004 Summer Olympics, he achieved seventh place in his hundred metres heat, thus failing to secure qualification for the second round. He ran the 100 metres in 10.58 seconds, which was a personal best time and national record.

Participating in the 2008 Summer Olympics, he ran 10.70 for 6th place in his hundred metres heat and failed to secure qualification for the second round.

His current personal best time is 10.57 seconds, achieved in June 2007 in Marseille. This is also the Monegasque record. He also holds the national records in 60 metres (6.94 s), 200 metres and shot put.

=== Representative roles ===
He was the manager of the Monaco representation during the 2012 Summer Olympics in London.

In 2024, Charlene, Princess of Monaco replaced him at the presidency of the Monegasque Rugby Federation.

Olympic Games
| Preceded by Thierry Vatrican | Flagbearer for Monaco; Athens 2004 | Succeeded by Mathias Raymond |
