= Jérémy Bottin =

Monegasque bobsledder (born 1973)

Jérémy Bottin OLY
Personal information
- Nationality: Monegasque
- Born: 19 August 1973 (age 52)

Sport
- Sport: Bobsleigh

Jérémy Bottin (born 19 August 1973) is a Monegasque bobsledder. He competed in the two man event at the 2006 Winter Olympics. In 2019, Bottin became the President of the Monegasque Association of Olympic Athletes.
