= Jean-François Calmes =

Monegasque bobsledder (born 1971)

Personal information
- Nationality: Monegasque
- Born: 6 January 1971 (age 54); Nice, France

Sport
- Sport: Bobsleigh

Jean-François Calmes (born 6 January 1971) is a Monegasque bobsledder. He competed at the 1998 Winter Olympics and the 2002 Winter Olympics.
