= Pascal Camia =

Monegasque bobsledder (born 1966)

Personal information
- Nationality: Monegasque
- Born: 13 November 1966 (age 58); Monte Carlo, Monaco

Sport
- Sport: Bobsleigh

Pascal Camia (born 13 November 1966) is a Monegasque bobsledder. He competed at the 1992, 1994 and the 1998 Winter Olympics.
