= Alexandra Coletti =

Monégasque alpine skier (born 1983)

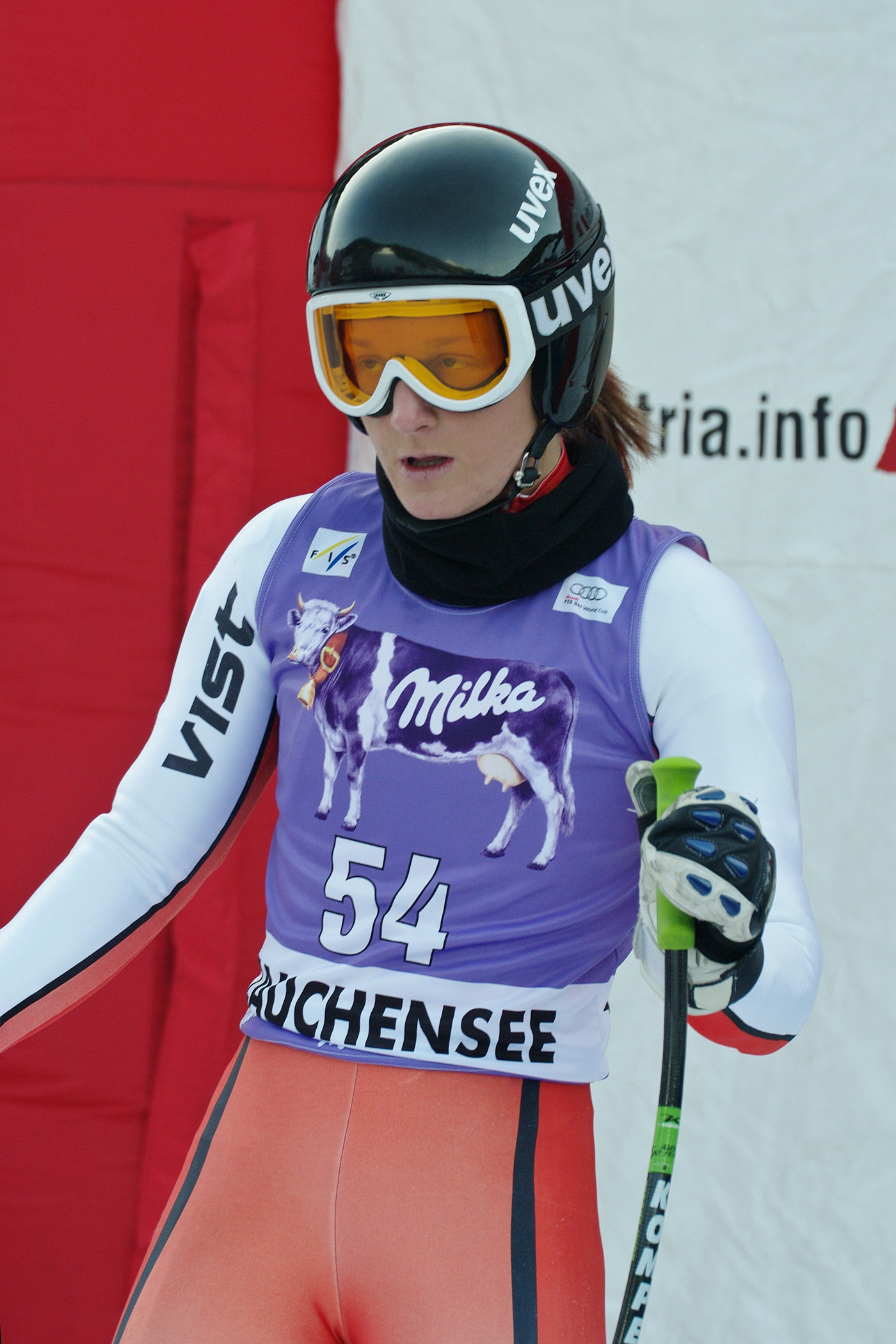
Coletti in January 2011

Alexandra Coletti (born 8 August 1983 in La Colle, Monaco) is a Monégasque alpine skier who competed for Monaco in the 2006 Winter Olympics. She also received the silver medal in downhill skiing at the 2005 European Cup. She later competed for Monaco at the 2010 Winter Olympics, and was Monaco's flag bearer during the Opening Ceremony. Her brother Stefano Coletti is a racing driver; he drove in the IndyCar Series in 2015.
