= Gilbert Bessi =

Monégasque bobsledder (born 1958)

Personal information
- Nationality: Monegasque
- Born: 9 July 1958 (age 68)

Sport
- Sport: Bobsleigh, sprinting

Gilbert Bessi (born 9 July 1958) is a Monegasque bobsledder and sprinter. He competed in the bobsleigh at four editions of the Winter Olympics between 1988 and 1998. He also competed in the men's 100 metres at the 1988 Summer Olympics.

== See also ==
- List of athletes who competed in both the Summer and Winter Olympic games
