= Patrice Servelle =

Monégasque Olympic bobsledder (born 1974)

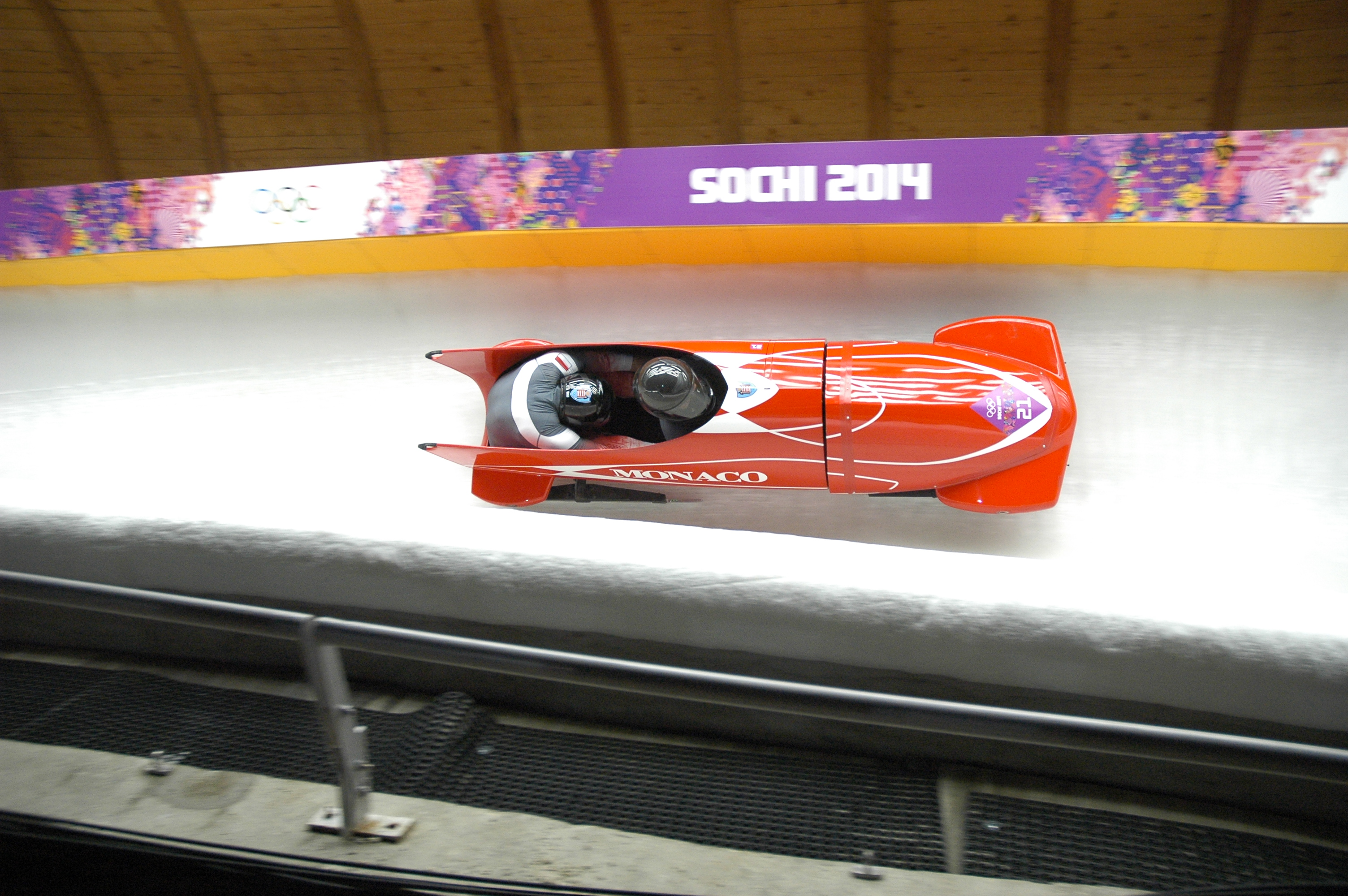
- Servelle at the 2014 Winter Olympics

Personal information
- Nationality: Monégasque
- Born: 20 July 1974 (age 51)

Sport
- Sport: Bobsleding

Patrice Servelle (born 20 July 1974, in Monaco) is a Monégasque Olympic bobsledder who has competed in the 2002, 2006, and the 2010 Winter Olympics. Servelle's placed 12th overall at the 2006 Winter Olympics, and was Monaco's flag bearer during the Opening Ceremony. He also finished the two-man Bobsleigh World Cup in second place, which was Monaco's first, and only World Cup medal.

Servelle's best finish at the FIBT World Championships was tenth in the four-man event at St. Moritz, Switzerland in 2007.
