= Brazil at the 1982 FIFA World Cup =

Matches of the Brazil national football team in the 1982 FIFA World Cup

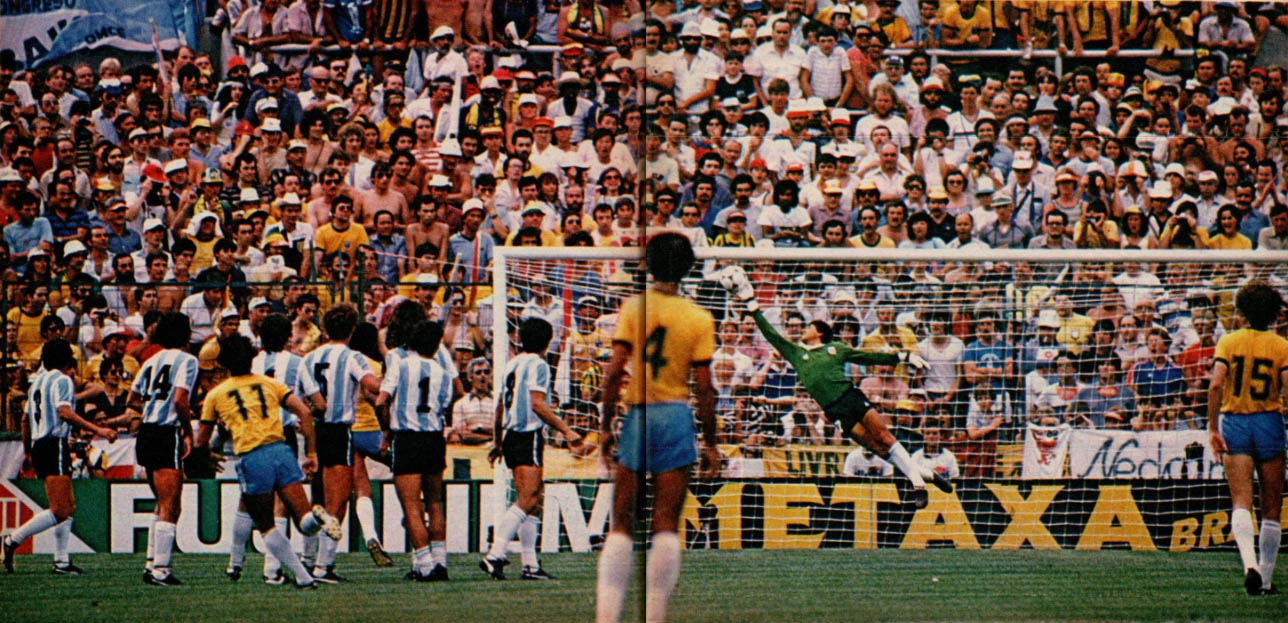
Brazil v Argentina. Éder's free kick that led to a goal by Zico from the rebound

The Brazil national football team participated in the 1982 FIFA World Cup, and in doing so maintained their record of being the only team to enter every World Cup Finals. Despite having ultimately lost, the side is widely regarded as one of the best of all time.

Brazil played until the Second Group Round, where they were defeated by Italy. This result meant that they finished the tournament in fifth place for the first time. They were coached by Telê Santana and captained by Sócrates.

== Qualifying ==
1982 FIFA World Cup qualification (CONMEBOL Group 1)

February 8, 1981, Caracas, Venezuela - Venezuela 0 - 1 Brazil

February 22, 1981, La Paz, Bolivia - Bolivia 1 - 2 Brazil

March 22, 1981, Rio de Janeiro, Brazil - Brazil 3 - 1 Bolivia

March 29, 1981, Goiânia, Brazil - Brazil 5 - 0 Venezuela

Rank	Team	Pts	Pld	W	D	L	GF	GA	GD
1	Brazil	8	4	4	0	0	11	2	9
2	Bolivia	2	4	1	0	3	5	6	-1
3	Venezuela	2	4	1	0	3	1	9	-8

== Preparation ==
In May 1981, after qualifying for the World Cup, Brazil embarked on an excursion through Europe, where they faced local national teams in friendlies. They beat England 1–0 at Wembley Stadium, France 3–1 at the Parc des Princes, and West Germany 2–1 at the Neckarstadion. In July, they defeated Spain 1–0 at the Estádio Octávio Mangabeira in Salvador, and on October 28, they won against Bulgaria 3–0 at the Olímpico Monumental. On 26 January 1982, Brazil beat East Germany 3–1 in a friendly that took place at the Machadão, in Natal. Between March and May 1982, the team played a series of friendlies in their home country, drawing 1–1 with Czechoslovakia, again defeating West Germany, 1–0, and beating Portugal 3–1. On May 19, they tied with Switzerland 1–1. The last game played before the World Cup was a 7–0 victory over Ireland at the Parque do Sabiá in Uberlândia.

== Squad ==
The squad was announced over three separate occasions. On April 13, Santana announced thirteen players from clubs that had already been eliminated from the Brasileirão. Four days later, Sócrates and Careca were revealed as part of the team. On April 26, Santana completed the list announcing the seven remaining players. (Note: Players who missed on the call up include Atlético Mineiro striker Reinaldo, excluded partly due to persecution by the Brazilian military dictatorship, of which he was a vocal opponent; the midfielder Adílio, a central piece of the Libertadores and World champions Flamengo side; and the young Guarani striker Careca, ruled out because of an injury.)

Coach: (Brazil) Telê Santana

No.	Pos.	Player	Date of birth (age)	Caps	Club
1	GK	Waldir Peres	2 January 1951 (aged 31)	22	(Brazil) São Paulo
2	DF	Leandro	17 March 1959 (aged 23)	5	(Brazil) Flamengo
3	DF	Oscar	20 June 1954 (aged 27)	35	(Brazil) São Paulo
4	DF	Luizinho	22 October 1958 (aged 23)	24	(Brazil) Atlético Mineiro
5	MF	Toninho Cerezo	21 April 1955 (aged 27)	48	(Brazil) Atlético Mineiro
6	DF	Júnior	29 June 1954 (aged 27)	34	(Brazil) Flamengo
7	MF	Paulo Isidoro	3 August 1953 (aged 28)	27	(Brazil) Grêmio
8	MF	Sócrates (c)	19 February 1954 (aged 28)	33	(Brazil) Corinthians
9	FW	Serginho Chulapa	23 December 1953 (aged 28)	15	(Brazil) São Paulo
10	MF	Zico	3 March 1953 (aged 29)	55	(Brazil) Flamengo
11	FW	Éder	25 May 1957 (aged 25)	24	(Brazil) Atlético Mineiro
12	GK	Paulo Sérgio	24 July 1954 (aged 27)	3	(Brazil) Botafogo
13	DF	Edevaldo	28 January 1958 (aged 24)	17	(Brazil) Internacional
14	DF	Juninho Fonseca	29 August 1958 (aged 23)	0	(Brazil) Ponte Preta
15	MF	Falcão	16 October 1953 (aged 28)	16	(Brazil) Internacional
16	DF	Edinho	5 June 1955 (aged 27)	33	(Brazil) Fluminense
17	DF	Pedrinho	22 October 1957 (aged 24)	8	(Brazil) Vasco da Gama
18	MF	Batista	8 March 1955 (aged 27)	32	(Brazil) Grêmio
19	MF	Renato	21 February 1957 (aged 25)	12	(Brazil) São Paulo
20	FW	Roberto Dinamite	13 April 1954 (aged 28)	29	(Brazil) Vasco da Gama
21	FW	Dirceu	15 June 1952 (aged 29)	23	(Spain) Atlético de Madrid
22	GK	Carlos	4 March 1956 (aged 26)	0	(Brazil) Ponte Preta

=== Analysis ===
After the unsuccessful 1978 campaign, in which an undefeated Seleção was eliminated on goal difference behind Argentina, Santana, who was appointed as coach on February 12 1980, sought to recover the offensive style which characterized earlier Brazil sides.

== The World Cup ==
=== First Group Round ===
Brazil entered the tournament on a 19-match unbeaten run. In Group 6, they showcased a highly attacking squad featuring Zico, Sócrates, Falcão and Éder, drawing comparisons with their 1970 side. They opened with a 2–1 comeback over the Soviet Union thanks to a late Éder strike, before defeating Scotland and New Zealand, netting four goals in each match.

Group 6

Team	Pts	Pld	W	D	L	GF	GA	GD
Brazil	6	3	3	0	0	10	2	+8
Soviet Union	3	3	1	1	1	6	4	+2
Scotland	3	3	1	1	1	8	8	0
New Zealand	0	3	0	0	3	2	12	-10

June 14, 1982
21:15

Brazil	2 - 1	Soviet Union
Sócrates 75'; Éder 88'	(Report)	Bal 34'

Estadio Ramón Sánchez Pizjuán, Seville
Ref: Castillo (ESP)
Attendance: 68,000

June 18, 1982
21:15

Brazil	4 - 1	Scotland
Zico 33'; Oscar 48'; Éder 63'; Falcão 87'	(Report)	Narey 18'

Estadio Benito Villamarín, Seville
Ref: Siles (CRC)
Attendance: 47,379

June 23, 1982
21:15

Brazil	4 - 0	New Zealand
Zico 28', 31'; Falcão 64'; Serginho 70'	(Report)

Estadio Benito Villamarín, Seville
Ref: Matovinović (YUG)
Attendance: 43,000

=== Second Group Round ===
Following qualification, Brazil were drawn in Group C alongside reigning champions Argentina and two time World Cup winners Italy. The grouping was described by the media as a ''group of death''. In the opener, the Azzurri prevailed 2–1 over Diego Maradona's side in an ill-tempered game in which Italy defenders Gaetano Scirea and Claudio Gentile were able to stop the Argentinian attack.

Argentina needed to defeat Brazil in their next match to avoid elimination. Zico opened the scoring early in the game, with Brazil dominating much of the first half, although Waldir Peres made a difficult save before half-time. In the second half, Argentina had a claimed penalty denied after Júnior brought Maradona down inside the box. Serginho extended the lead with a header and Júnior made it 3–0 after a through ball pass by Zico. Maradona was sent off after violently kicking João Batista. Argentina scored late with Ramón Díaz, and the match ended 3–1.

The third-day match between Brazil and Italy would decide the group winner, and thus the team to advance to the semi-finals. Italy struggled in the group stage, having drawn all their three games, and were known for a more defensive style of play. Paolo Rossi opened the scoring with a header, but Brazil soon responded with Sócrates, assisted by a Zico pass in a play described as a ''piece of fantasy''. Moments later, Italy went up again with Rossi, who received the ball from a mistake by Toninho Cerezo. Brazil created more chances, many of which were denied by Dino Zoff. In the second half, the Canarinha equalized with a long-range shot by Falcão, made possible with space created by a Cerezo run attracting defenders. As Brazil were qualifying through goal difference, a poor clearance from an Italy corner kick went back to the six-yard line, and the ball found Rossi, who then completed his hat-trick. As the game neared to its end, both sides had each a disallowed goal. Before the final whistle, with Brazil desperately attacking Italy, Zoff made a spectacular in-line save from an Oscar header. The match is regarded as one of the greatest in footballing history.

Group C

Team	Pts	Pld	W	D	L	GF	GA	GD
Italy	4	2	2	0	0	5	3	+2
Brazil	2	2	1	0	1	5	4	+1
Argentina	0	2	0	0	2	2	5	-3

July 2, 1982
17:15

Argentina	1 - 3	Brazil
Díaz 89'	(Report)	Zico 11'; Serginho 66'; Júnior 75'

Estadio Sarriá, Barcelona
Ref: Vázquez (MEX)
Attendance: 43,000

July 5, 1982
17:15

Italy	3 - 2	Brazil
Rossi 5', 25', 74'	(Report)	Sócrates 12'; Falcão 68'

Estadio Sarriá, Barcelona
Ref: Klein (ISR)
Attendance: 44,000

== Starting 11 ==
Brazil generally conserved the starting eleven throughout the tournament, with individual changes being made from match to match. (Note: Roberto Dinamite was left out of the matchday squad in all five matches, which drew media and public criticism.)

No.	Pos.	Nat.	Name	MS	Notes
1	GK	(Brazil)	Peres	5	
2	RB	(Brazil)	Leandro	5	
3	CB	(Brazil)	Oscar	5	
4	CB	(Brazil)	Luizinho	5	
6	LB	(Brazil)	Júnior	5	
15	DM	(Brazil)	Falcão	5	
5	DM	(Brazil)	Cerezo	4	Dirceu had one start
10	AM	(Brazil)	Zico	5	
8	RW	(Brazil)	Sócrates	5	
11	LW	(Brazil)	Éder	5	
9	CF	(Brazil)	Serginho	5	

== Goalscorers ==
4 goals

- (Brazil) Zico

3 goals

- (Brazil) Falcão

2 goals

- (Brazil) Éder
- (Brazil) Serginho
- (Brazil) Sócrates

1 goal

- (Brazil) Júnior
- (Brazil) Oscar

== Assists ==
4 assists

- (Brazil) Zico

2 assists

- (Brazil) Júnior
- (Brazil) Leandro

1 assist

- (Brazil) Falcão
- (Brazil) Sócrates
- (Brazil) Serginho Chulapa
- (Brazil) Paulo Isidoro

== Legacy ==
Remembered for its attacking philosophy, artistry, and technical quality, the squad has been described as one of the greatest never to win the World Cup, as well as one of the strongest Brazil national teams. Johan Cruyff praised Santana's style as displaying ''a genuine love of football''. Pep Guardiola referred to it as ''the most wonderful national team that ever existed''. It is often compared to other sides that failed to win the World Cup despite being favorites or having notable campaigns, including Hungary in 1954, the Netherlands in 1974, Brazil in 2006, and, more recently, France in 2026.

Football historians have associated the team's failure with a turning point in Brazilian football philosophy, which shifted from the classical offensive, fluid, and open style to a more pragmatic approach. The World Cup winning 1994 squad has been contrasted with the 1982 side for its more organized defense and midfield, as well as its positional game. However, modern Brazilian managers have cited the team as an inspiration, such as Tite, who coached Brazil from 2016 to 2022, and Fernando Diniz, who led Fluminense to their first Libertadores title in 2023.

The poet Carlos Drummond de Andrade, reflecting on the defeat, wrote ''in a toe-to-toe battle, fortune did not favor us''. The team has been the subject of books, including O trauma da bola: a Copa de 82, a recollection of crônicas by the former Brazil coach João Saldanha, 82 - Uma copa para sempre by sports journalist Celso Unzete, and 1982 Brazil: The Glorious Failure by Stuart Horsfield.
