= Andorra at the 2015 Games of the Small States of Europe =

- IOC code: AND
- NOC: Andorran Olympic Committee

in Reykjavík, Iceland 1 – 6 June 2015
- Medals Ranked 8th: Gold 4 Silver 1 Bronze 5 Total 10

Andorra competed at the 2015 Games of the Small States of Europe, in Reykjavík, Iceland from 1 to 6 June 2015.

== Medalists ==
Medal	Name	Sport	Event	Date
Gold	Marcos Sanza	Athletics	Men's 10.000 m	2 June
Gold	Laura Salles Lopez	Judo	Women's -63 kg	5 June
Gold	Laurent Recouderc	Tennis	Men's Singles	6 June
Gold	Genildo Cassiano; Da Silva Prada	Volleyball	Men's Beach tournament	6 June
Silver	Marcos Sanza	Athletics	Men's 5.000 m	6 June
Bronze	Claudia Guri	Athletics	Women's High Jump	4 June
Bronze	Joan Bautista Poux Gautier; Laurent Recouderc	Tennis	Men's Singles	4 June
Bronze	Pep Sansa	Athletics	Men's 3000 m steeplechase	6 June
Bronze	Ivan Llanos Grandoso	Judo	Men's -60 kg	5 June
Bronze	Pol Arias Dourdet	Swimming	Men's 800m freestyle	5 June

Medals by sport
Sport	1st place, gold medalist(s)	2nd place, silver medalist(s)	3rd place, bronze medalist(s)	Total
Athletics	1	1	2	4
Judo	1	0	1	2
Tennis	1	0	1	2
Volleyball	1	0	0	1
Swimming	0	0	1	1
Total	4	1	5	10

== Athletics ==
Men

Athlete	Event	Heat		Final	
Athlete	Event	Result	Rank	Result	Rank
Mikel de Sa	100m	11.10	9	Did not advance	
Mikel de Sa	200m	22.85	8 Q	22.87	8
Marcos Sanza	5000m	—N/a		14:48.34	2nd place, silver medalist(s)
Marcos Sanza	10000m	—N/a		30:59.42	1st place, gold medalist(s)
Pep Sansa	3000m steeple	—N/a		9:28.58	3rd place, bronze medalist(s)
Miquel Vilchez	Pole vault	—N/a		4.70	4

Women

Athlete	Event	Heat		Final	
Athlete	Event	Result	Rank	Result	Rank
Laia Isus	800m	—N/a		2:33.14	6
Laia Isus	1500m	—N/a		4:56.71	6
Claudia Guri	High Jump	—N/a		1.68	3rd place, bronze medalist(s)
Claudia Guri	Long Jump	—N/a		5.21	5
Claudia Guri	Triple Jump	—N/a		11.52	4

== Basketball ==
=== Men's tournament ===
Team	Pld	W	L	PF	PA	PD	Pts
Montenegro	3	3	0	276	211	+65	6
Iceland	3	2	1	248	235	+13	5
Luxembourg	3	1	2	223	245	−22	4
Andorra	3	0	3	209	265	−56	3

Matches

3 June 2015
17:00

Boxscore

Iceland	83–61	Andorra
Scoring by quarter: 28–18, 19–15, 20–15, 16–13
Pts: Gunnarsson 16; Rebs: Nathanaelsson 7 Asts: Steinarsson 8		Pts: Gabriel 12; Rebs: Gabriel 8 Asts: Colom 4

Laugardalshöll, Reykjavík

4 June 2015
14:00

Report

Montenegro	89–69	Andorra
Scoring by quarter: 28–19, 20–18, 25–12, 16–20
Pts: Dašić 13; Rebs: Dašić 8 Asts: Pavličević 8		Pts: Colom 17; Rebs: Marín 7 Asts: Galera 3

Laugardalshöll, Reykjavík

5 June 2015
17:00

Boxscore

Luxembourg	93–79	Andorra
Scoring by quarter: 21–17, 16–23, 22–19, 34–20
Pts: Schumacher 30; Rebs: Stephens 10; Asts: Müller 7		Pts: Galera 19; Rebs: Marín 7 Asts: Galera 10

Laugardalshöll, Reykjavík

== Golf ==
Athlete	Event	Round				Total	Rank
Athlete	Event	1	2	3	4	Total	Rank
Kevin Esteve Rigaill	Men	71	72	72	76	291	5
Marina Creus Ribas	Women	77	88	81	77	323	5

== Gymnastics ==
Individual

Athlete	Event	Apparatus				Total	Rank
Athlete	Event	V	UB	BB	F	Total	Rank
Chloe Marie Baltenneck TIXADOR	Women's All-around	12.750	8.250	10.400	11.600	43.000	6
Chloe Marie Baltenneck TIXADOR	Women's Floor	—N/a			11.000	11.000	8

Team

Athlete	Event	Apparatus				Total	Rank
Athlete	Event	V	UB	BB	F	Total	Rank
Chloe Marie Baltenneck Tixador	Women's Team	12.750	8.250	10.400	11.600	43.000	6

== Judo ==
Athlete	Event	Groupstage			Quarterfinals	Semifinals	Repechage	Final / BM	
Athlete	Event	Opposition Result	Opposition Result	Opposition Result	Opposition Result	Opposition Result	Opposition Result	Opposition Result	Rank
Ivan Llanos Grandoso	Men's -60 kg	(Luxembourg) Tom Schmit; L 0000-1010	(Iceland) Dofri Bragason; W 1010-0000	(Monaco) Yamm Siccardi; L 0000-1000	—N/a				3rd place, bronze medalist(s)
	Men's -66 kg								
	Men's -73 kg								
	Men's Team								
	Women's -63 kg								
	Women's -70 kg								

== Shooting ==
Athlete	Event	Score	Rank
Esther Barrugues Alviña	Women's Air Rifle	95,6	7

== Swimming ==
Athlete	Event	Heat		Final	
Athlete	Event	Time	Rank	Time	Rank
Pol Arias Dourdet	Men's 400 m freestyle	4:10.79	6 Q	4:07.44	6
Pol Arias Dourdet	Men's 800 m freestyle	—N/a		16:18.50	3rd place, bronze medalist(s)
Pol Arias Dourdet	Men's 200 m backstroke	—N/a		2:13.08	5
Monica Ramirez Abella	Women's 50 m freestyle	27.95	=7 Q	27.61	6
Monica Ramirez Abella	Women's 100 m freestyle	59.79	7	59.71	7
Monica Ramirez Abella	Women's 200 m freestyle	2:12.37	7 Q	2:02.61	7
Monica Ramirez Abella	Women's 100 m backstroke	1:08.41	5 Q	1:07.27	5
Monica Ramirez Abella	Women's 200 m backstroke	—N/a		2:28.64	4
Nadia Tudo Cubells	Women's 50 m freestyle	27.95	=7 Q	27.86	8
Nadia Tudo Cubells	Women's 100 m freestyle	1:00.47	11	Did not advance	
Nadia Tudo Cubells	Women's 200 m freestyle	2:13.50	9	Did not advance	
Nadia Tudo Cubells	Women's 400 m freestyle	4:42.08	8 Q	4:39.98	8

== Table Tennis ==
Athlete	Event	Group stage				Quarterfinals	Semifinals	Final / BM	
Athlete	Event	Opposition Score	Opposition Score	Opposition Score	Standing	Opposition Score	Opposition Score	Opposition Score	Rank
Patrick Rodriguez Chalais	Men's Singles	(Cyprus) Yiangos Yiangou; L 1-3 (1-11, 7-11, 11-7, 6-11)	(San Marino) Lorenzo Ragni; L 0-3 (6-11, 6-11, 5-11)	(Luxembourg) Traian Ciociu; L 0-3 (4-11, 6-11, 4-11)	4	Did not advance			
Ferran Diaz I Palahi	Men's Singles	(Luxembourg) Gilles Michely; L 0-3 (6-11, 8-11, 4-11)	(Montenegro) Luka Bakic; L 0-3 (3-11, 8-11, 6-11)	—N/a	3	Did not advance			
Patrick Rodriguez Chalais; Ferran Diaz I Palahi	Men's Doubles	(Cyprus) Yiangou/Yiangou; L 0-3 (2-11, 4-11, 5-11)	(Monaco) Peretti/Provost; L0-3 (5-11, 3-11, 2-11)	(San Marino) Ragni/Vannuci; L 0-3 (6-11, 8-11, 4-11)	4	Did not advance			
Patrick Rodriguez Chalais; Ferran Diaz I Palahi	Men's Team	(Luxembourg) Glod/Michely; L 0-3	(San Marino) Ragni/Vannuci; L 0-3	—N/a	3	Did not advance			

== Tennis ==
Athlete	Event	Round 1	Round 2	Quarterfinals	Semifinals	Final	
Athlete	Event	Opposition Score	Opposition Score	Opposition Score	Opposition Score	Opposition Score	Rank
Joan Bautista Poux Gautier	Men's Singles	Bye	(Luxembourg) Ugo Nastasi; L 1-4 r	Did not advance			
Laurent Recouderc	Men's Singles	Bye	(Iceland) Rafn Kumar Bonifacius; W 6-0 7^{7}-6^{3}	(Cyprus) Petros Chrysochos; W 4-6 6-2 7-5	(Malta) Matthew Asciak; W 7^{7}-6^{4} 6-1	(Luxembourg) Ugo Nastasi; W 7^{7}-6^{4} 3-6 6-4	1st place, gold medalist(s)
Joan Bautista Poux Gautier; Laurent Recouderc	Men's Doubles	—N/a		(Iceland) Bonifacius/Gunnarsson; W 7-5 6-4	(Cyprus) Chrysochos/Kyratzis; L w/o	Did not advance	3rd place, bronze medalist(s)
Judit Cartaña Alaña	Women's Singles	(Iceland) Hjördís Rósa Guðmundsdóttir; L 4-6 2-6	—N/a	Did not advance			
Joan Bautista Poux Gautier; Judit Cartaña Alaña	Mixed Doubles	—N/a		(Liechtenstein) Leuch/Von Deichman; L w/o	Did not advance		

== Volleyball ==
=== Beach ===
Athlete	Event	Group stage				Semifinals	Final / BM	
Athlete	Event	Opposition Score	Opposition Score	Opposition Score	Standing	Opposition Score	Opposition Score	Rank
Genildo Cassiano; Da Silva Prada	Men's	Iceland; W 2-0 (21-6, 21-5)	San Marino; W 2-0 (21-8, 21-9)	Cyprus; W 2-0 (21-14, 21-18)	1 Q	Luxembourg; W 2-0 (21-15, 21-16)	Liechtenstein; W 2-1 (17-21, 22-20, 15-7)	1st place, gold medalist(s)
