= Judo at the 2011 Games of the Small States of Europe =

Judo Judo at the 2011 Games of the Small States of Europe
- Location: Liechtenstein
- Dates: 31 May – 2 June 2011

Competition at external databases
- Links: EJU • JudoInside

Judo competitions at the 2011 Games of the Small States of Europe were held from 31 May to 2 June 2011.

== Medal summary ==
=== Men's events ===
Event	Gold	Silver	Bronze
Extra-lightweight (60 kg)	Yann Siccardi (MON)	Brent Law (MLT)	Yves Monn (LIE)
Half-lightweight (66 kg)	Andreas Krassas (CYP)	Jeremy Saywell (MLT)	Cédric Bessi (MON)
Half-lightweight (66 kg)	Andreas Krassas (CYP)	Jeremy Saywell (MLT)	Massimiliano Urbinati (SMR)
Lightweight (73 kg)	Yoann Suau (MON)	Alekos Lazarou (CYP)	Emanuel Moser (LIE)
Half-middleweight (81 kg)	Denis Barboni (LUX)	Hermann Unnarsson (ISL)	Luca Bonfini (SMR)
Half-middleweight (81 kg)	Denis Barboni (LUX)	Hermann Unnarsson (ISL)	Andreas Trikomitis (CYP)
Middleweight (90 kg)	Denis Leider (LUX)	Mirko Kaiser (LIE)	David Berardi (MON)
Middleweight (90 kg)	Denis Leider (LUX)	Mirko Kaiser (LIE)	Aleksandar Manev (CYP)
Half-heavyweight (100 kg)	Georges Simon (LUX)	Thorvaldur Blondal (ISL)	Franck Vatan (MON)
Heavyweight (+100 kg)	Thormodur Arni Jonsson (ISL)	Francois Laudrin (MON)	Micah Dahlem (LUX)

=== Women's events ===
Event	Gold	Silver	Bronze
Half-lightweight (52 kg)	Marie Muller (LUX)	Yamina Allag (MON)	Pinelopi Stavrinou (CYP)
Lightweight (57 kg)	Manon Durbach (LUX)	Sophia Allag (MON)	Joanna Camilleri (MLT)
Half-middleweight (63 kg)	Anne-Laure Bonnet (MON)	Laura Salles Lopez (AND)	Charlotte Arendt (LUX)
Middleweight (70 kg)	Lynn Mossong (LUX)	Anna Víkingsdóttir (ISL)	Anja Kaiser (LIE)

=== Team events ===
Event	Gold	Silver	Bronze
Men's Team	Luxembourg; Bob Schmitt; Denis Leider; Georges Simon	Iceland; Hermann Unnarsson; Thorvaldur Blondal	Cyprus; Andreas Krassas; Andreas Trikomitis; Aleksandar Manev
Men's Team	Luxembourg; Bob Schmitt; Denis Leider; Georges Simon	Iceland; Hermann Unnarsson; Thorvaldur Blondal	Monaco; Habib Alouache; Yoann Suau; Thierry Vatrican
Women's Team	Luxembourg; Marie Muller; Manon Durbach; Lynn Mossong	Monaco; Yamina Allag; Anna Laure Bonnet; Melanie Fanciulli	Cyprus
Women's Team	Luxembourg; Marie Muller; Manon Durbach; Lynn Mossong	Monaco; Yamina Allag; Anna Laure Bonnet; Melanie Fanciulli	Andorra; Alda Babi; Laura Salles Lopez

=== Medal table ===
Rank	Nation	Gold	Silver	Bronze	Total
1	Luxembourg	8	0	2	10
2	Monaco	3	4	4	11
3	Iceland	1	4	0	5
4	Cyprus	1	1	5	7
5	Malta	0	2	1	3
6	Liechtenstein	0	1	3	4
7	Andorra	0	1	1	2
8	San Marino	0	0	2	2
Totals (8 entries)		13	13	18	44
