= Yann Siccardi =

Monegasque judoka (born 1984)

Personal information
- Nationality: Monégasque
- Born: 11 April 1984 (age 42) La Colle, Monaco
- Occupation: Judoka
- Weight: 60 kg (132 lb)

Sport
- Country: Monaco
- Sport: Judo
Medal record
Men's Judo
Representing Monaco
Mediterranean Games
Silver medal – second place	2009 Pescara	-60 kg
Games of the Small States of Europe
Gold medal – first place	2011 Liechtenstein	-60 kg
Gold medal – first place	2015 Iceland	-60 kg
Gold medal – first place	2017 San Marino	-60 kg
Silver medal – second place	2019 Montenegro	-60 kg

Profile at external databases
- JudoInside.com: 16438

Yann Siccardi (born 11 April 1984) is a Monégasque Olympic judoka who competes in the Men's 60 kg category. He competed in the 2008 and the 2012 Summer Olympics. At the 2008 Summer Olympics, he lost in the first round to Craig Fallon of Great Britain. At the 2012 Summer Olympics, he was defeated in the third round by Russian Arsen Galstyan. Siccardi won a gold medal in the 60 kg and under category at the 2011 Games of the Small States of Europe. Siccardi qualified for the 2016 Summer Olympics and is the Monégasque flag bearer.

Olympic Games
Preceded by Angélique Trinquier	Flagbearer for Monaco; Rio de Janeiro 2016	Succeeded by Xiaoxin Yang & Quentin Antognelli
