= Judo at the 2019 Games of the Small States of Europe =

Judo competition

Judo Judo at the 2019 Games of the Small States of Europe
- Venue: Sport Center Cetinje
- Location: Cetinje, Montenegro
- Dates: 28, 30 May

Competition at external databases
- Links: JudoInside

the Judo competitions at the 2019 Games of the Small States of Europe were held at the Sport Center Cetinje, Cetinje on 28 and 30 May 2019.

== Medal table ==
* Host nation (Montenegro)

Rank	Nation	Gold	Silver	Bronze	Total
1	Montenegro (MNE)*	4	0	2	6
2	Monaco (MON)	3	3	2	8
3	Cyprus (CYP)	2	4	1	7
4	Liechtenstein (LIE)	2	0	2	4
5	Luxembourg (LUX)	0	2	4	6
6	Iceland (ISL)	0	1	3	4
7	Malta (MLT)	0	1	0	1
8	Andorra (AND)	0	0	3	3
9	San Marino (SMR)	0	0	1	1
Totals (9 entries)		11	11	18	40

== Medalists ==
=== Men ===
Event	Gold	Silver	Bronze
Extra-lightweight −60 kg	Georgios Balarjishvili; Cyprus	Yann Siccardi; Monaco	Alexander Heiðarsson; Iceland
Half-lightweight −66 kg	Jusuf Nurković; Montenegro	Jeremy Saywell; Malta	Tom Schmit; Luxembourg Tristan Frei; Liechtenstein
Lightweight −73 kg	Nikola Gardašević; Montenegro	Claudio Nunes Dos Santos; Luxembourg	Cédric Bessi; Monaco Rountolf Kourtidis; Cyprus
Half-middleweight −81 kg	Tizie Gnamien; Monaco	Aristos Michael; Cyprus	Árni Pétur Lund; Iceland Nebojša Gardašević; Montenegro
Middleweight −90 kg	Raphael Schwendinger; Liechtenstein	Egill Blöndal; Iceland	Paolo Persoglia; San Marino Denis Barboni; Luxembourg
Half-heavyweight −100 kg	Danilo Pantić; Montenegro	Georgios Kroussaniotakis; Cyprus	Þór Davíðsson; Iceland Anto Dubreta; Montenegro
Team	Montenegro; Nikola Gardašević; Jusuf Nurković; Danilo Pantić	Cyprus; Georgios Balarjishvili; Rountolf Kourtidis; Georgios Kroussaniotakis	Luxembourg; Denis Barboni; Claudio Nunes Dos Santos; Andrea Fritsch; Tom Schmit Liechtenstein; David Büchel; Tristan Frei; Maximilian Mehser; Raphael Schwendinger

=== Women ===
Event	Gold	Silver	Bronze
Half-lightweight −52 kg	Sofia Asvesta; Cyprus	Kim Eiden; Luxembourg	Yamina Allag; Monaco Alda Babi; Andorra
Half-middleweight −63 kg	Florine Soula; Monaco	Rania Drid; Monaco	Lia Povedano; Andorra
Middleweight −70 kg	Mareen Hollenstein; Liechtenstein	Carulina Grimigni; Monaco	Monique Kedinger; Luxembourg
Team	Monaco; Yamina Allag; Carulina Grimigni; Lisa Mébarki; Florine Soula	Cyprus; Sofia Asvesta; Nikola Evripidou	Andorra; Alda Babi; Lia Povedano
