= Judo at the 2015 Games of the Small States of Europe =

Judo competition

Judo Judo at the 2015 Games of the Small States of Europe
- Location: Reykjavík, Iceland
- Date: 5 June 2015

Competition at external databases
- Links: EJU • JudoInside

The judo competitions at the 2015 Games of the Small States of Europe took place on 5 June 2015 at the Laugaból Ármann Gymnastic Hall in Reykjavík.

== Medal summary ==
=== Medal table ===
* Host nation (Iceland)

Rank	Nation	Gold	Silver	Bronze	Total
1	Luxembourg	4	2	1	7
2	Montenegro	2	2	0	4
3	Iceland*	1	2	1	4
4	Monaco	1	1	3	5
5	Liechtenstein	1	1	2	4
6	Cyprus	1	1	0	2
7	Andorra	1	0	1	2
8	San Marino	0	2	1	3
9	Malta	0	0	5	5
Totals (9 entries)		11	11	14	36

=== Men's competition ===
Event	Gold	Silver	Bronze
Extra-lightweight (60 kg)	Yann Siccardi (MON)	Tom Schmit (LUX)	Ivan Llanos (AND)
Half-lightweight (66 kg)	Andreas Krassas (CYP)	Guillaume Ereseo (MON)	Timo Wenzel (LUX)
Half-lightweight (66 kg)	Andreas Krassas (CYP)	Guillaume Ereseo (MON)	Jeremy Saywell (MLT)
Lightweight (73 kg)	Nikola Gušić (MNE)	Hermann Unnarsson (ISL)	Georgi Atanasov (MLT)
Lightweight (73 kg)	Nikola Gušić (MNE)	Hermann Unnarsson (ISL)	Cédric Bessi (MON)
Half-middleweight (81 kg)	Srdjan Mrvaljevic (MNE)	Sveinbjörn Iura (ISL)	Jean-Christophe Bracco (MON)
Half-middleweight (81 kg)	Srdjan Mrvaljevic (MNE)	Sveinbjörn Iura (ISL)	Paolo Persoglia (SMR)
Middleweight (90 kg)	Denis Barboni (LUX)	Robert Photis Nicola (CYP)	Mirko Kaiser (LIE)
Middleweight (90 kg)	Denis Barboni (LUX)	Robert Photis Nicola (CYP)	Murman Korchilava (MLT)
Half-heavyweight (100 kg)	David Büchel (LIE)	Karim Gharbi (SMR)	Franck Vatan (MON)
Half-heavyweight (100 kg)	David Büchel (LIE)	Karim Gharbi (SMR)	Þór Davíðsson (ISL)

=== Women's competition ===
Event	Gold	Silver	Bronze
Half-lightweight (52 kg)	Marie Muller (LUX)	Judith Biedermann (LIE)	
Lightweight (57 kg)	Manon Durbach (LUX)	Tanja Božović (MNE)	Joanna Camilleri (MLT)
Half-middleweight (63 kg)	Laura Sallés (AND)	Taylor King (LUX)	Marcon Bezzina (MLT)
Middleweight (70 kg)	Lynn Mossong (LUX)	Anđela Džaković (MNE)	Anja Kaiser (LIE)
Half-heavyweight (78 kg)	Anna Soffía Víkingsdóttir (ISL)	Jessica Zannoni (SMR)	
