= Judo at the 2017 Games of the Small States of Europe =

Judo competition

Judo Judo at the 2017 Games of the Small States of Europe
- Location: Acquaviva, San Marino
- Date: 31 May 2017

Competition at external databases
- Links: JudoInside

The Judo competitions at the 2017 Games of the Small States of Europe were held at the Acquaviva School Gym in Acquaviva, San Marino on 31 May and 2 June 2017.

== Medal table ==
Rank	Nation	Gold	Silver	Bronze	Total
1	Montenegro (MNE)	7	1	2	10
2	Luxembourg (LUX)	3	4	4	11
3	Monaco (MON)	2	2	2	6
4	Iceland (ISL)	2	0	1	3
5	Cyprus (CYP)	0	3	2	5
6	San Marino (SMR)*	0	2	0	2
7	Liechtenstein (LIE)	0	1	3	4
8	Andorra (AND)	0	1	0	1
9	Malta (MLT)	0	0	1	1
Totals (9 entries)		14	14	15	43

== Medalists ==
=== Men ===
Event	Gold	Silver	Bronze
Extra lightweight −60 kg	Yann Siccardi; Monaco	Christos Skouroumounis; Cyprus	Rodney Zammit; Malta
Half lightweight −66 kg	Tom Schmit; Luxembourg	Benjamin Scariot; Monaco	Jusuf Nurković; Montenegro
Lightweight −73 kg	Cédric Bessi; Monaco	Balša Sinanović; Montenegro	Charilaos Hadjiadamou; Cyprus
Lightweight −73 kg	Cédric Bessi; Monaco	Balša Sinanović; Montenegro	Claudio Nunes dos Santos; Luxembourg
Half middleweight −81 kg	Arso Milić; Montenegro	Johan Blanc; Monaco	Kyriakos Nikolaou; Cyprus
Half middleweight −81 kg	Arso Milić; Montenegro	Johan Blanc; Monaco	Bilge Bayanaa; Luxembourg
Middleweight −90 kg	Marko Bubanja; Montenegro	Paolo Persoglia; San Marino	Denis Barboni; Luxembourg
Middleweight −90 kg	Marko Bubanja; Montenegro	Paolo Persoglia; San Marino	David Büchel; Liechtenstein
Heavyweight −100 kg	Danilo Pantić; Montenegro	Valentin Knobloch; Luxembourg	Grimur Ivarsson; Iceland
Heavyweight +100 kg	Þormóður Árni Jónsson; Iceland	Panagiotis Kyriakou; Cyprus	None awarded
Team	Montenegro; Arso Milić; Jusuf Nurković; Danilo Pantić	Cyprus; Charilaos Hadjiadamou; Kyriakos Nikolaou; Christos Skouroumounis	Luxembourg; Denis Barboni; Bilge Bayanaa; Tom Schmit
Team	Montenegro; Arso Milić; Jusuf Nurković; Danilo Pantić	Cyprus; Charilaos Hadjiadamou; Kyriakos Nikolaou; Christos Skouroumounis	Monaco; Jean-Christophe Bracco; Benjamin Scariot; Franck Vatan

=== Women ===
Event	Gold	Silver	Bronze
Half lightweight −52 kg	Elma Ličina; Montenegro	Kim Eiden; Luxembourg	Sara-Yamina Allag; Monaco
Lightweight −57 kg	Manon Durbach; Luxembourg	Judith Biedermann; Liechtenstein	None awarded
Half middleweight −63 kg	Ivana Sunjevic; Montenegro	Taylor King; Luxembourg	None awarded
Middleweight −70 kg	Lynn Mossong; Luxembourg	Laura Sallés; Andorra	Jovana Peković; Montenegro
Half heavyweight −78 kg	Anna Soffia Vikingsdottir; Iceland	Jessica Zannoni; San Marino	Anja Kaiser; Liechtenstein
Team	Montenegro; Elma Ličina; Jovana Peković; Ivana Sunjevic	Luxembourg; Manon Durbach; Kim Eiden; Taylor King; Lynn Mossong	Liechtenstein; Judith Biedermann; Anja Kaiser; Stephanie Rinner
