= Paolo Persoglia =

Sammarinese judoka

Personal information
- Born: 28 April 1994 (age 32)
- Occupation: Judoka

Sport
- Country: San Marino
- Sport: Judo
- Weight class: –90 kg
Medal record
Men's judo
Representing San Marino
Games of the Small States of Europe
Silver medal – second place	2013 Luxembourg	–73 kg
Silver medal – second place	2017 San Marino	–90 kg
Bronze medal – third place	2015 Iceland	–81 kg
Bronze medal – third place	2019 Montenegro	–90 kg

Profile at external databases
- IJF: 14536
- JudoInside.com: 58399
- Updated on 3 November 2021

Paolo Persoglia (born 28 April 1994) is a Sanmarrinese judoka. He competed at the 2020 Olympic Games in the men's -90 kg category.

== Career ==
He is able to represent Italy or San Marino. He won a regional final in Judo in 2008 in Recanati, to earn a place in his age-group category at the Italian Championships. He competed for San Marino at the 2010 Summer Youth Olympics in Singapore.

In 2013, he was training as a member of Judo Club San Marino. Between 2013 and 2023, Persoglia has medalled multiple times in the Judo competitions at the Games of the Small States of Europe representing San Marino. He won silver in Luxembourg in 2013, and bronze in Iceland 2015. He was a silver medalist again in 2017, losing out in the final of the -90 kg category to Montenegrin Marko Bubanja. He won a bronze medal in the -90 kg category at the 2019 edition in Montenegro. He was guaranteed to be a silver medalist again in 2023, reaching the final of the -90 kg final.

In 2017, he also competed in the Senior European Judo Cup in Sarajevo.

He was selected to compete at the 2019 World Judo Championships in Tokyo, Japan, where he drawn against Colton Brown of the United States. He competed in the -90 kg category at the delayed 2020 Summer Games held in 2021 in Tokyo, where he was drawn to face Noël van 't End of the Netherlands, the gold medalist at the 2019 World Championships and number two ranked judoka in the world in that category. Persoglia lost by ippon in the opening minute of the contest.

In October 2022, he won first place at the AICS national championship in Riccione.
