= Anne-Laure Bonnet =

French television presenter and sports journalist

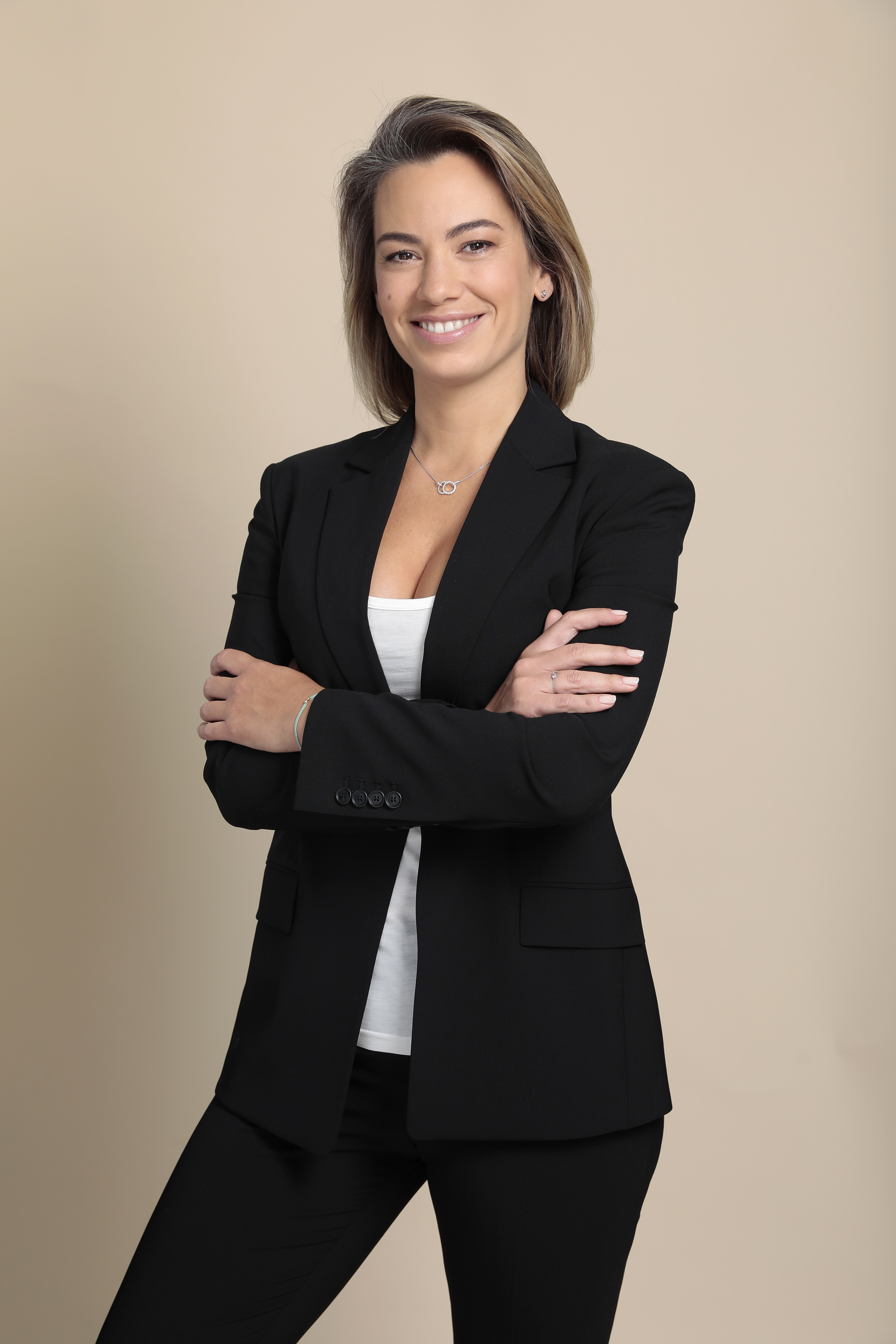
- Anne-Laure Bonnet in 2019.
- Born: July 30, 1978 (age 47)
- Occupations: Sports journalist, television presenter
- Years active: 2005–present
- Television: Sky Sports (2009–2013); BeIN Sports (2013–2020)
- Website: www.annelaurebonnet.com

Anne-Laure Bonnet (born 30 July 1978) is a French sports journalist and television presenter.

== Early life and education ==
Anne-Laure Bonnet is the daughter of Bernard Bonnet, a retired prefect. Her mother works in telecommunications. During her adolescence, she became interested in motorsports, with a particular interest in the racing driver Ayrton Senna. She graduated with a degree in foreign languages and studied at Sciences Po.

== Television career ==
Anne-Laure Bonnet began her career as a stringer, followed by a stint at Canal+ as a Formula One editor. After working as a correspondent at L'Équipe, in 2005, she became a journalist specialising in motorsports. In 2006, she co-wrote with the collaboration of Stéphane Barbé the book 100 ans de Grands Prix automobiles en France. The same year, she made a string for one month for the account of M6, where she followed the matches of the team of Brazil during the 2006 FIFA World Cup. She then participated at the redaction of L'année du football 2006. She continued being part of the redaction of L'Équipe until 2008.

In March 2008, she joined TF1 to present the program F1 à la Une, dedicated to Formula One, that she co-hosted with Denis Brogniart.

Polyglot, fluent in English, Italian, Spanish, German and Portuguese, she left TF1 and France in 2009 to exile to Italy, and joined the channel Sky Sports Italia. She continued to focus on the news of the Formula One, and then on Italian and European football.

In August 2013, she came back to France and joined the channel BeIN Sports. She became a journalist making before-match and after-match interviews during the football and handball evenings of the channel.

In September 2017, she joined the team of C à vous on France 5 for a sports column while continuing her activities on channel BeIN Sports.

In May 2018, she co-hosted with Nagui the program Tout le monde joue avec le football on France 2.

In September 2020, she joined the channel Téléfoot, property of the group Mediapro and broadcaster of the French Ligue 1 and Ligue 2, to present the program Le Vrai Mag on Sunday evening about the best of the Ligue 1 day. The program ended on 7 February 2021 with the closing of the channel.
