= Cédric Bessi =

Monégasque judoka (born 1990)

Personal information
- Born: 28 November 1990 (age 35)
- Occupation: Judoka

Sport
- Country: Monaco
- Sport: Judo
- Weight class: ‍–‍73 kg

Achievements and titles
- Olympic Games: R16 (2020)
- World Champ.: R32 (2018)
- European Champ.: R32 (2014, 2015, 2018, 2019, 2021, 2024)
Medal record
Men's judo
Representing Monaco
Games of the Small States of Europe
Gold medal – first place	2017 San Marino	‍–‍73 kg
Silver medal – second place	2023 Pembroke	‍–‍73 kg
Bronze medal – third place	2011 Liechtenstein	‍–‍66 kg
Bronze medal – third place	2015 Reykavik	‍–‍73 kg
Bronze medal – third place	2019 Cetinje	‍–‍73 kg

Profile at external databases
- IJF: 1328
- JudoInside.com: 41847

Cédric Bessi (born 28 November 1990) is a Monégasque judoka. He competed at the 2020 Summer Olympics.

== Early and personal life ==
Bessi was introduced to judo by his father Eric-Louis Bessi, who was the first judoka to compete for Monaco at the Olympic Games, doing so twice, in 1984 and 1988, as well as later serving as the president of the executive committee of the Monaco Judo Federation.

He moved to study and train in Paris at the age of 19 years-old and earned a Judo Coaching and Personal Trainer Diploma from the Institute of Judo in Paris. Outside of Judoka, he achieved a Vocational Studies Certificate [BEP] in accounting. He also himself served as a Council Member of the executive committee of the Monaco Judo Federation.

== Career ==
He started Judo at the age of five supported by his father but was later coached by Marcel Pietri, Technical Director of the Monegasque Judo Federation and Coach of the Judo Club of Monaco.

He was a bronze medalist in the -66 kg category at the 2011 Games of the Small States of Europe in Liechtenstein. He was also a bronze medalist in the -73 kg category at the 2019 Games of the Small States of Europe in Montenegro.

Bessi was selected to compete at the delayed 2020 Summer Games in Tokyo, one of only six athletes from the principality of Monaco to compete. They were given a personal send off at the Yacht Club de Monaco by Albert II, Prince of Monaco. Competing at the Games, on the 26 July 2021, he won his opening judo bought in the -73 kg category against Lucas Diallo of Burkina Faso. In the round-of-16 he was defeated by eventual medalist Tsend-Ochiryn Tsogtbaatar of Mongolia.
