= Valentin Knobloch =

German judoka

Personal information
- Born: 5 May 1980 (age 46)
- Occupation: Judoka

Sport
- Country: Germany
- Sport: Judo
- Weight class: ‍–‍81 kg, ‍–‍90 kg

Achievements and titles
- European Champ.: 5th (2001)
Medal record
Men's judo
Representing Germany
European Junior Championships
Bronze medal – third place	1999 Rome	‍–‍81 kg
Representing Luxembourg
Games of the Small States of Europe
Silver medal – second place	2017 San Marino	‍–‍100 kg

Profile at external databases
- JudoInside.com: 249
- Updated on 19 November 2024

Valentin Knobloch (born 5 May 1980) is a German judoka.

== Achievements ==
Year	Tournament	Place	Weight class
1995	International Masters, Bremen, Men U18	2nd	Lightweight (71 kg)
2000	World Masters, Munich	3rd	Half middleweight (81 kg)
2001	European Judo Championships	5th	Half middleweight (81 kg)
