= Raphael Schwendinger =

Liechtensteiner judoka (born 1998)

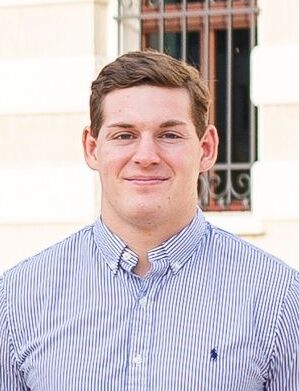
- Schwendinger in 2021

Personal information
- Born: 1 January 1998 (age 28)
- Occupation: Judoka

Sport
- Country: Liechtenstein
- Sport: Judo
- Weight class: ‍–‍90 kg

Achievements and titles
- Olympic Games: R32 (2020)
- World Champ.: R64 (2021)
- European Champ.: R32 (2019)
Medal record
Men's judo
Representing Liechtenstein
Games of the Small States of Europe
| Gold medal – first place | 2019 Cetinje | ‍–‍90 kg |

Profile at external databases
- IJF: 17924
- JudoInside.com: 91165
- Updated on 2 April 2025

Raphael Schwendinger (born 1 January 1998) is a Liechtensteiner sports administrator and former judoka. He competed at the 2020 Summer Olympics in Tokyo. In 2024, he joined the board of the Liechtenstein Olympic Committee.

== Judo career ==
Schwendinger is a member of Judo Club Ruggell in his homeland. He won the gold medal in the ‍–‍90 kg category at the 2019 Games of the Small States in Montenegro. He missed out on competing at the 2020 European Championships in Prague, Czech Republic due to a bout of influenza.

Schwendinger competed at the 2021 European Championships in Lisbon, in April 2021. In May 2021, he spent several weeks training with the Russian judo team and sparred with multiple world and European champion Alexander Mikhaylin.

Schwendinger was selected to compete at the delayed 2020 Summer Games in Tokyo, Japan in the men's ‍–‍90 kg category in July 2021. He became the first representative in judo for Liechtenstein at the Games since Ulrike Kaiser at the 2000 Sydney Games. Competing in Tokyo, he was beaten by Colton Brown of the United States in the opening round, despite what was described as a "dominant start" to the contest. He did, however, have the honour of being the flag bearer for his country at the Olympic ceremony.

In 2022, Schwendinger won a silver medal in the ‍–‍90 kg category at the European Championship for small states, held in Luxembourg.

== Post Judo career ==
He announced his intention to retire from competitive sport in March 2023. In May 2024, he joined the board of the Liechtenstein Olympic Committee.

== Personal life ==
He studied medicine and during the COVID-19 pandemic in 2020 he volunteered his time to work in coronavirus diagnostics in Vaduz.
