= Cyprus at the 2015 Games of the Small States of Europe =

- IOC code: CYP
- NOC: The Cyprus National Olympic Committee

in Reykjavík, Iceland 1 – 6 June 2015
- Medals Ranked 3rd: Gold 20 Silver 16 Bronze 16 Total 52

Games of the Small States of Europe appearances
- 2015

Cyprus competed at the 2015 Games of the Small States of Europe, in Reykjavík, Iceland from 1 to 6 June 2015.

== Athletics ==
Men
Track

| Athlete | Event | Heat | | Final | |
| Athlete | Event | Result | Rank | Result | Rank |
|---|---|---|---|---|---|
| Christos Chatziangelidis | 100m | 10.66 | 1 Q | 10.75 | 2nd place, silver medalist(s) |
| Panagiotis Ioannou | 100m | 10.86 | 5 Q | 10.64 | 1st place, gold medalist(s) |
| Kyriakos Antoniou | 200m | 22.09 | 6 q | 22.09 | 5 |
| Paisios Dimitriadis | 200m | 21.74 | 2 Q | 21.75 | 2nd place, silver medalist(s) |
| Georgios Avraam | 400m | 51.92 | 3 Q | 49.84 | 3rd place, bronze medalist(s) |
| Amine Khadiri | 800m | —N/a | | 1:56.72 | 1st place, gold medalist(s) |
| Amine Khadiri | 1500m | —N/a | | 3:51.97 | 1st place, gold medalist(s) |
| Nikolas Fragkou | 5000m | —N/a | | 15:33.64 | 4 |
| Nikolas Fragkou | 3000m steeplechase | —N/a | | 9:22.68 | 2nd place, silver medalist(s) |
| Milan Trajkovic | 100m hurdles | —N/a | | 13.86 | 1st place, gold medalist(s) |
| Cyprus | 4x100m | —N/a | | 41.94 | 1st place, gold medalist(s) |
| Cyprus | 4x400m | —N/a | | 3:17.86 | 2nd place, silver medalist(s) |

Field

| Athlete | Event | Result | Rank |
|---|---|---|---|
| Vasilios Konstantinou | High Jump | 2.18 | 1st place, gold medalist(s) |
| Nikandros Stylianou | Pole vault | 5.15 | 1st place, gold medalist(s) |
| Panagiotis Ioannou | Long jump | 7.06 | 4 |
| Giorgos Poullos | Long jump | 7.16 | 2nd place, silver medalist(s) |
| Panagiotis Volou | Triple jump | 15.39 | 1st place, gold medalist(s) |
| Andreas Xristou | Discus throw | 53.51 | 2nd place, silver medalist(s) |

Women
Track

| Athlete | Event | Heat | | Final | |
| Athlete | Event | Result | Rank | Result | Rank |
|---|---|---|---|---|---|
| Dimitra Kyriakidou | 100m | —N/a | | 12.04 | 3rd place, bronze medalist(s) |
| Marianna Pisiara | 100m | —N/a | | 12.13 | 4 |
| Dimitra Kyriakidou | 200m | —N/a | | 25.18 | 5 |
| Marianna Pisiara | 200m | —N/a | | 25.15 | 4 |
| Christiana Katsari | 400m | 57.86 | 2 Q | 56.61 | 4 |
| Kalliopi Kountouri | 400m | 58.94 | 4 Q | 56.14 | 3rd place, bronze medalist(s) |
| Natalia Evangelidou | 800m | —N/a | | 2:09.56 | 3rd place, bronze medalist(s) |
| Natalia Evangelidou | 1500m | —N/a | | 4:29.08 | 2nd place, silver medalist(s) |
| Elpida Christodoulidou | 5000m | —N/a | | 17:35.65 | 4 |
| Marilena Sofokleous | 5000m | —N/a | | 17:03.78 | 2nd place, silver medalist(s) |
| Angeliki Athanasopoulou | 100m hurdles | —N/a | | 14.71 | 3rd place, bronze medalist(s) |
| Irida Theodosiou | 400m hurdles | —N/a | | 1:07.21 | 5 |
| Cyprus | 4x100m | —N/a | | 47.28 | 2nd place, silver medalist(s) |
| Cyprus | 4x400m | —N/a | | 3:48.31 | 2nd place, silver medalist(s) |

Field

| Athlete | Event | Result | Rank |
|---|---|---|---|
| Maria Aristotelous | Pole vault | NM | |
| Androniki Lada | Discus throw | 53.73 | 1st place, gold medalist(s) |
| Cathrine Jayne Cabasag Beatty | Hammer throw | 60.09 | 1st place, gold medalist(s) |
