= Brazil at the 1978 FIFA World Cup =

Matches of the Brazil national football team in the 1978 FIFA World Cup

The Brazil national football team played in the 1978 FIFA World Cup, and thus maintained their record of being the only team to enter every World Cup Finals. Despite remaining unbeaten through the tournament, Brazil finished third place, having failed to top their group in the second group phase, behind eventual champions Argentina.

The side was eliminated on goal difference following the controversial Argentina v Peru match.

== Qualifying ==
1978 FIFA World Cup qualification (CONMEBOL Group 1)

- February 20, 1977, Bogotá, Colombia - Colombia 0 - 0 Brazil
- March 9, 1977, Rio de Janeiro, Brazil - Brazil 6 - 0 Colombia
- March 13, 1977, Asunción, Paraguay - Paraguay 0 - 1 Brazil
- March 20, 1977, Rio de Janeiro, Brazil - Brazil 1 - 1 Paraguay

Rank	Team	Pts	Pld	W	D	L	GF	GA	GD
1	Brazil	6	4	2	2	0	8	1	+7
2	Paraguay	4	4	1	2	1	3	3	0
3	Colombia	2	4	0	2	2	1	8	−7

Brazil advanced to the final round.

1978 FIFA World Cup qualification (Final round)

- July 10, 1977, Cali, Colombia - Brazil 1 - 0 Peru
- July 14, 1977, Cali, Colombia - Brazil 8 - 0 Bolivia

Rank	Team	Pts	Pld	W	D	L	GF	GA	GD
1	Brazil	4	2	2	0	0	9	0	+9
2	Peru	2	2	1	0	1	5	1	+4
3	Bolivia	0	2	0	0	2	0	13	−13

Brazil and Peru qualified.

== The Cup ==
=== First round ===
Group 3

Team	Pld	W	D	L	GF	GA	GD	Pts
Austria	3	2	0	1	3	2	+1	4
Brazil	3	1	2	0	2	1	+1	4
Spain	3	1	1	1	2	2	0	3
Sweden	3	0	1	2	1	3	−2	1

3 June 1978
13:45 ART

Brazil	1 – 1	Sweden
Reinaldo 45'	Report	Sjöberg 37'

Estadio José Maria Minella, Mar del Plata
Attendance: 32,569
Referee: Clive Thomas (Wales)

7 June 1978
13:45 ART

Brazil	0 – 0	Spain
	Report

Estadio José Maria Minella, Mar del Plata
Attendance: 34,771
Referee: Sergio Gonella (Italy)

11 June 1978
13:45 ART

Brazil	1 – 0	Austria
Roberto Dinamite 40'	Report

Estadio José Maria Minella, Mar del Plata
Attendance: 35,221
Referee: Robert Wurtz (France)

=== Second round ===
Group B

Team	Pld	W	D	L	GF	GA	GD	Pts
Argentina	3	2	1	0	8	0	+8	5
Brazil	3	2	1	0	6	1	+5	5
Poland	3	1	0	2	2	5	−3	2
Peru	3	0	0	3	0	10	−10	0

Argentina qualified for the final match, and Brazil qualified for the match for third place.

14 June 1978
16:45 ART

Peru	0 – 3	Brazil
	Report	Dirceu 15', 27'; Zico 72' (pen.)

Estadio Ciudad de Mendoza, Mendoza
Attendance: 31,278
Referee: Nicolae Rainea (Romania)

18 June 1978
19:15 ART

Argentina	0 – 0	Brazil
	Report

Estadio Gigante de Arroyito, Rosario
Attendance: 37,326
Referee: Károly Palotai (Hungary)

21 June 1978
16:45 ART

Poland	1 – 3	Brazil
Lato 45'	Report	Nelinho 13'; Roberto Dinamite 58', 63'

Estadio Ciudad de Mendoza, Mendoza
Attendance: 39,586
Referee: Juan Silvagno Cavanna (Chile)

=== Match for third place ===
24 June 1978
15:00 ART

Brazil	2 – 1	Italy
Nelinho 64'; Dirceu 71'	Report	Causio 38'

Estadio Monumental, Buenos Aires
Attendance: 69,659
Referee: Abraham Klein (Israel)

== Starting 11 ==
No.	Pos.	Nat.	Name	MS	Notes
1	GK	(Brazil)	Leão	7	
16	RB	(Brazil)	Neto	4	Nelinho had three starts
3	CB	(Brazil)	Oscar	7	
4	CB	(Brazil)	Amaral	7	
2	LB	(Brazil)	Toninho	6	Edinho had two starts
19	RM	(Brazil)	Mendonça	4	Zico had three starts
17	CM	(Brazil)	Batista	7	
5	CM	(Brazil)	Cerezo	7	
11	LM	(Brazil)	Dirceu	6	Rivellino had one start
18	CF	(Brazil)	Gil	6	
20	CF	(Brazil)	Dinamite	5	Reinaldo had two starts

== Scorers ==
3 goals

- (Brazil) Dirceu
- (Brazil) Roberto Dinamite

2 goals

- (Brazil) Nelinho

1 goal

- (Brazil) Reinaldo
- (Brazil) Zico
