= Laura Sallés =

Andorran judoka

Medal record

Women's Judo

Representing Andorra

Games of the Small States of Europe
Gold medal – first place	2009 Cyprus	-63 kg
Gold medal – first place	2015 Iceland	-63 kg
Silver medal – second place	2007 Monaco	-63 kg
Silver medal – second place	2011 Liechtenstein	-63 kg
Silver medal – second place	2013 Luxembourg	-63 kg
Silver medal – second place	2017 San Marino	-70 kg

Laura Sallés López (born 15 February 1986) is a practitioner of judo from Andorra. She has participated in several World Championships and has won several medals at the Games of Small States. Sallés participated in the 2016 Summer Olympics, serving as her country's flag bearer. In the Women's 63 kg, she lost to Katharina Haecker in the first round.

Olympic Games
Preceded by Mireia Gutiérrez	Flagbearer for Andorra; 2016 Rio de Janeiro	Succeeded by Irineu Esteve Altimiras
