= 2015 Games of the Small States of Europe =

International multi-sport event

XVI Games of the Small States of Europe XVI Smáþjóðaleikarnir
- Host city: Reykjavík
- Country: Iceland
- Nations: 9
- Athletes: 789
- Events: 120 in 11 sports
- Opening: 1 June 2015
- Closing: 6 June 2015
- Opened by: Ólafur Ragnar Grímsson
- Website: www.iceland2015.is

The 2015 Games of the Small States of Europe, also known as the XVI Games of the Small States of Europe, were held in Iceland. The slogan was "Natural Power". Icelandic singer Paul Oscar sang during the opening ceremony.

Host nation Iceland won the most medals at the Games, which included ten sports.

== Games ==
=== Participating teams ===
- Andorra (52)
- Cyprus (56)
- Iceland (host team) (240)
- Liechtenstein (42)
- Luxembourg (136)
- Malta (58)
- Monaco (105)
- Montenegro (42)
- San Marino (58)

=== Sports ===
- Athletics (36)
- Basketball (2)
- Golf (4)
- Gymnastics (14)
- Judo (12)
- Shooting (5)
  - Trap shooting (1)
- Swimming (32)
- Table tennis (6)
- Tennis (5)
- Volleyball (4)
  - Beach volleyball (2)

=== Venues ===
List of venues
Venue(s)	Events
Laugardalsvöllur	Athletics
Laugardalshöll	Basketball
Laugardalshöll	Volleyball
Laugardalslaug	Beach volleyball
Laugardalslaug	Swimming
Korpa Golf Course (Korpuvöllur, Korpúlfsstöðum)	Golf
Laugaból Ármann Gymnastic Hall	Artistic gymnastics
Laugaból Ármann Gymnastic Hall	Judo
Hátún Sports Hall and Álfsnes Shooting Range	Shooting
TBR Badminton Hall	Table tennis
Tennishöll Kópavogs Tennis Hall	Tennis

== Medal table ==
Host country

Rank	Nation	Gold	Silver	Bronze	Total
1	Iceland (ISL)*	38	46	31	115
2	Luxembourg (LUX)	34	22	24	80
3	Cyprus (CYP)	20	16	16	52
4	Montenegro (MNE)	9	4	8	21
5	Monaco (MON)	7	11	15	33
6	Liechtenstein (LIE)	7	9	9	25
7	Malta (MLT)	4	9	19	32
8	Andorra (AND)	4	1	6	11
9	San Marino (SMR)	0	6	6	12
Totals (9 entries)		123	124	134	381
