= Brazil at the 2006 FIFA World Cup =

Matches of the Brazil national football team in the 2006 FIFA World Cup

At the 2006 FIFA World Cup, Brazil participated for the 18th time in the event. The country remained as the only national team to have participated in every installment of the FIFA World Cup.

The Brazilian team reached the quarter-finals, where they were defeated by France, finishing the tournament in the fifth place — for the fourth time in history after 1954, 1982 and 1986.

== Qualifying ==
Brazil's qualifying for the event marked the first time in history in which a returning champion (the country had won the 2002 World Cup) had to play for a berth in the next World Cup — that had a direct effect in the organization of the 2006 World Cup: since the 1990 World Cup, the competition has had an opening match, which is played immediately after the Opening Ceremonies; until the last World Cup, this match was a privilege of the winner of the previous World Cup, who would play its first match as the first match of the given World Cup, against an opponent from its group, as decided by the official draw (in the 1990 World Cup, Argentina, winner of the 1986 FIFA World Cup, played Cameroon in the opening match; in 1994, Germany, winner of the 1990 World Cup, played Bolivia; in 1998, Brazil played Scotland and in 2002 France played Senegal). As of the 2006 World Cup, because of the change in the rules, with the last champion no longer having a secured berth in the competition, the opening match has become another privilege of the host nation (in the 2006 World Cup, Germany, as the host nation, played Costa Rica in the opening match). Despite being the returning champion, the Brazilian team debuted, against Croatia, only four days after the Opening Ceremonies and the opening match.

The national team qualified with more ease than in previous years. For the 1994 World Cup, Brazil only qualified in the very last match, against Uruguay, where a defeat would have meant missing out on the tournament. For the 2002 FIFA World Cup, Brazil had four different managers, and was once in serious jeopardy of being left out of the event.

The Qualifying for the 2006 World Cup repeated the format installed for the previous Qualifying tournament, in 2000 and 2001 (for the 2002 World Cup): all ten South American countries played each other, in two-leg matches, with the top four teams qualifying automatically for the World Cup, whereas the fifth-best team would play the champion of Oceania, which was Australia, for a berth in the World Cup.

Brazil finished first, winning the Qualifying tournament. The results were the following:

Results
Date	Venue	Opponent	Score
7 September 2003	Estadio Metropolitano, Barranquilla	Colombia	2:1
10 September 2003	Vivaldão, Manaus	Ecuador	1:0
16 November 2003	Estadio Nacional, Lima	Peru	1:1
19 November 2003	Pinheirão, Curitiba	Uruguay	3:3
31 March 2004	Defensores del Chaco, Asunción	Paraguay	0:0
2 June 2004	Mineirão, Belo Horizonte	Argentina	3:1
6 June 2004	Estadio Nacional, Santiago	Chile	1:1
5 September 2004	Morumbi, São Paulo	Bolivia	3:1
9 October 2004	Estadio José Pachencho Romero, Maracaibo	Venezuela	5:2
13 October 2004	Estádio Rei Pelé, Maceió	Colombia	0:0
17 November 2004	Estadio Olímpico Atahualpa, Quito	Ecuador	0:1
27 March 2005	Serra Dourada, Goiânia	Peru	1:0
30 March 2005	Centenario, Montevideo	Uruguay	1:1
4 June 2005	Beira-Rio, Porto Alegre	Paraguay	4:1
7 June 2005	Monumental de Nuñez, Buenos Aires	Argentina	1:3
3 September 2005	Estádio Mané Garrincha, Brasília	Chile	5:0
8 October 2005	Estadio Hernando Siles, La Paz	Bolivia	1:1
11 October 2005	Mangueirão, Belém	Venezuela	3:0

The final standings were the following:

Final Standings
Country	Pts	Pld	W	D	L	GF	GA	GD
Brazil	34	18	9	7	2	35	17	18
Argentina	34	18	10	4	4	29	17	12
Ecuador	28	18	8	4	6	23	19	4
Paraguay	28	18	8	4	6	23	23	0
Uruguay	25	18	6	7	5	23	28	-5
Colombia	24	18	6	6	6	24	16	8
Chile	22	18	5	7	6	18	22	-4
Venezuela	18	18	5	3	10	20	28	-8
Peru	18	18	4	6	8	20	28	-8
Bolivia	14	18	4	2	12	20	37	-17

== World Cup preparation ==
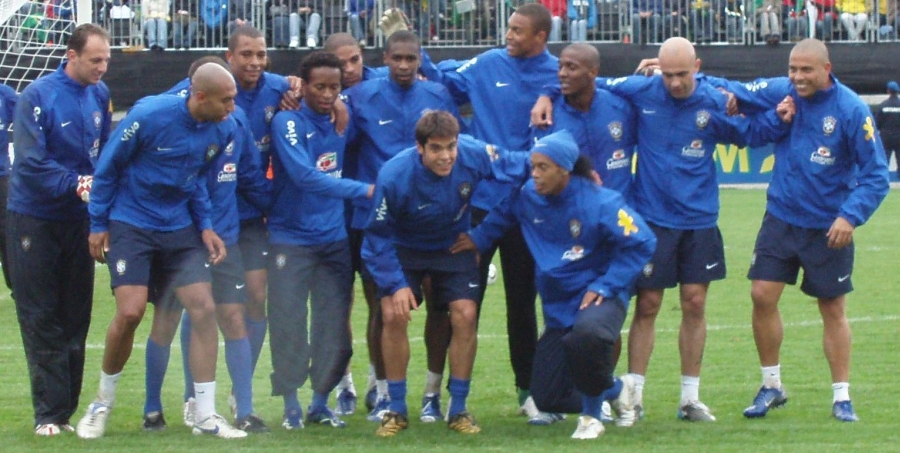
The Brazilian squad preparing for the World Cup in Weggis, Switzerland

A month before the start of the competition, the Brazil national team took quarters in the small Swiss town of Weggis, at the Weggis Park Hotel. The objective was to get the team accustomed to Germany's climate while maintaining the focus on the competition. The preparation started on 22 May and ended on 4 June.

During this time, the Brazilian team played two friendly matches. The first was on 28 May, against the under-20 team of the Brazilian club Fluminense, which was in Europe to play a tournament and took a detour to Switzerland to meet and play the national team; this match ended 13–1 in favour of the national team. The second match was played against the state team of the Swiss Lucerne. The match took place in Basel, at the St. Jakob Stadion and was won by the Brazilian team with a score of 8 goals to nul.

For this period in Switzerland, the Brazilian Football Confederation sold the rights to explore the presence of the national team to a Swiss events enterprise. In exchange for the declared amount of US$1.2 million, the Swiss company was allowed to sell tickets for the practice sessions — which were sold at €40 each, for about 5,000 people per session —, negotiate permissions for vending points to operate within the training facility and surrounding area — which were sold for about €2,000 plus 10% of the profit — and to organize and explore the friendly matches that the national team was to play during its preparation in Switzerland.

On 31 May, only 13 days away from the team's debut in the World Cup, defender Edmílson was cut from the squad due to a knee injury he had sustained during the practice session the day prior. São Paulo's Mineiro was called to take his place.

Upon leaving Weggis, on 4 June the national team made a stop in Geneva on 5 June to play its last friendly match before arriving in Germany. There, the team played New Zealand at the Stade de Genève – refereed by Jerome Laperriere – defeating New Zealand 4–0.

Finally, the team travelled to the German town of Königstein im Taunus, which invested the declared amount of €500,000 in order to prepare for receiving the Brazilian team.

== Draw ==
Traditionally, the host nation (in this case, Germany) is the first seed, being placed in Group A. On 6 December 2005, so as to prevent a possible match between Brazil and Germany before the final, FIFA placed the previous competition champion as the sixth seed, in Group F. The opponents of the Brazilian team in the first stage were, respectively, Croatia, Australia and Japan.

=== History ===
Round Robin

The Brazilian team had never faced any of its first round opponents before in World Cups. But other matches, both official and friendly ones, have taken place. The history of those matches until, but not including, the 2006 World Cup is as follows:

Opponent	Matches	Victories	Ties	Defeats	Goals scored	Goals conceded	First match	Last match
Croatia	1	0	1	0	1	1	1:1 (on 17 August 2005 at Poljud, Split)	1:1 (on 17 August 2005 at Poljud, Split)
Australia	5	3	1	1	9	1	1:0 (on 7 July 1988, at Melbourne Cricket Ground, Melbourne)	0:1 (on 9 June 2001 at Munsu Cup Stadium, Ulsan, South Korea)
Japan	7	5	2	0	16	3	1:0 (on 23 July 1989, at Estádio São Januário, Rio de Janeiro)	2:2 (on 22 June 2005 at RheinEnergieStadion, Cologne, Germany)

Round of 16

Prior to their meeting in the Round of 16 of the 2006 FIFA World Cup, Brazil and Ghana had played only one friendly match. Although this was officially a match between the two main teams, Brazil played it using its under-23 team (the so-called "Olympic squad"), as the match was a part of the preparation for the football competition of the 1996 Summer Olympic Games.

Opponent	Matches	Victories	Ties	Defeats	Goals scored	Goals conceded	First match	Last match
Ghana	1	1	0	0	8	2	8:2 (on 27 March 1996, at Estádio Benedito Teixeira, São José do Rio Preto, São Paulo, Brazil)	8:2 (on 27 March 1996, at Estádio Benedito Teixeira, São José do Rio Preto, São Paulo, Brazil)

Quarter-final

Both the first and the last matches between Brazil and France prior to their 2006 World Cup quarter-final encounter were friendly matches. The last one was a commemorative display for FIFA's centennial anniversary.

Opponent	Matches	Victories	Ties	Defeats	Goals scored	Goals conceded	First match	Last match
France	12	5	4	3	21	17	3:2 (on 1 August 1930, at Estádio das Laranjeiras, Rio de Janeiro, Brazil)	0:0 (on 20 May 2004 at Stade de France, Saint-Denis, France)

== World Cup squad ==
Number / Name		Club	Birthdate	Pld	Goals	YC	RC
Goalkeepers
1	Dida	Milan	10 July 1973	5	0	0	0
12	Rogério Ceni	São Paulo	22 January 1973	1	0	0	0
22	Júlio César	Internazionale	3 September 1979	0	0	0	0
Defenders
2	Cafu (captain)	Milan	7 June 1970	4	0	2	0
3	Lúcio	Bayern Munich	8 May 1978	5	0	1	0
4	Juan	Bayer Leverkusen	1 February 1979	5	0	2	0
6	Roberto Carlos	Real Madrid	10 April 1973	4	0	0	0
13	Cicinho	Real Madrid	24 June 1980	2	0	0	0
14	Luisão	Benfica	13 February 1981	0	0	0	0
15	Cris	Lyon	3 June 1977	0	0	0	0
16	Gilberto	Hertha BSC	25 April 1976	1	1	1	0
Midfielders
5	Emerson	Juventus	4 April 1976	3	0	1	0
8	Kaká	Milan	22 April 1982	5	1	0	0
10	Ronaldinho	Barcelona	21 March 1980	5	0	0	0
11	Zé Roberto	Bayern Munich	6 July 1974	5	1	0	0
17	Gilberto Silva	Arsenal	7 October 1976	4	0	0	0
18	Mineiro ^{1}	São Paulo	2 August 1975	0	0	0	0
19	Juninho	Lyon	30 January 1975	3	1	0	0
20	Ricardinho	Besiktas	31 May 1976	2	0	0	0
Forwards
7	Adriano	Internazionale	17 February 1982	4	2	1	0
9	Ronaldo	Real Madrid	22 September 1976	5	3	2	0
21	Fred	Lyon	31 October 1981	1	1	0	0
23	Robinho	Real Madrid	25 January 1984	4	0	1	0
Coach
	Carlos Alberto Parreira		27 February 1943

Pld = matches played, YC = yellow cards, RC = red cards.

^{1} Mineiro replaced Edmílson, who was cut due to a knee injury.

== Matches ==
All times local (UTC+2)

=== Round robin ===
Group F

Team	Pts	Pld	W	D	L	GF	GA	GD
1. Brazil	9	3	3	0	0	7	1	+6
2. Australia	4	3	1	1	1	5	5	0
3. Croatia	2	3	0	2	1	2	3	-1
4. Japan	1	3	0	1	2	2	7	-5

First Round

Brazil vs Croatia

Tuesday, 13 June 2006
21:00 - Olympiastadion, Berlin - Attendance: 72,000

Brazil	1 – 0 (1 – 0)	Croatia
Kaká 44'

Start line-up of the match

BRAZIL:
GK	1	Dida
DF	2	Cafu (C)
DF	3	Lúcio
DF	4	Juan
DF	6	Roberto Carlos
MD	5	Emerson (yellow card) 42'
MD	8	Kaká
MD	11	Zé Roberto
FW	7	Adriano
FW	9	Ronaldo	(- 70')
FW	10	Ronaldinho
Substitutions:
FW	23	Robinho	(+ 70')
Coach:
Carlos Alberto Parreira

- Referee: Benito Archundia (Mexico)
- Assistant referees:
  - José Ramírez (Mexico)
  - Héctor Vergara (Canada)
- Fourth official: Mohamed Guezzaz (Morocco)
- Fifth official: Brahim Djezzar (Algeria)
- Man of the match: (Brazil) Kaká

Second Round

Brazil vs. Australia

Sunday, 18 June 2006
18:00 - FIFA World Cup Stadium Munich, Munich - Attendance: 66,000

Brazil	2 – 0 (0 – 0)	Australia
Adriano 49'
Fred 90'

Start line-up of the match

BRAZIL:
GK	1	Dida
DF	2	Cafu (C) (yellow card) 29'
DF	3	Lúcio
DF	4	Juan
DF	6	Roberto Carlos
MD	5	Emerson	(-72')
MD	8	Kaká
MD	11	Zé Roberto
FW	7	Adriano	(-88')
FW	9	Ronaldo	(-72') (yellow card) 31'
FW	10	Ronaldinho
Substitutions:
MD	17	Gilberto Silva	(+ 72')
FW	23	Robinho	(+ 72') (yellow card) 83'
FW	21	Fred	(+ 88')
Coach:
Carlos Alberto Parreira

- Referee: Markus Merk (Germany)
- Assistant referees:
  - Christian Schräer (Germany)
  - Jan-Hendrik Salver (Germany)
- Fourth official: Marco Rodríguez (Mexico)
- Fifth official: Leonel Leal (Costa Rica)
- Man of the match: (Brazil) Zé Roberto

Third Round

Brazil vs Japan

Thursday, 22 June 2006
21:00 - FIFA World Cup Stadium Dortmund, Dortmund - Attendance: 65,000

Japan	1 – 4 (1–1)	Brazil
Tamada 34'		Ronaldo 46'+, 81'
		Juninho 53'
		Gilberto 59'

Start line-up of the match

BRAZIL:
GK	1	Dida (C)	(- 82')
DF	3	Lúcio
DF	4	Juan
DF	16	Gilberto (yellow card) 44'
DF	13	Cicinho
MD	8	Kaká	(- 71')
MD	17	Gilberto Silva
MD	19	Juninho
FW	23	Robinho
FW	9	Ronaldo (C +82')
FW	10	Ronaldinho	(- 71')
Substitutions:
MD	11	Zé Roberto		(+ 71')
MD	20	Ricardinho		(+ 71')
GK	12	Rogério Ceni		(+ 82')
Coach:
Carlos Alberto Parreira

- Referee: Éric Poulat (France)
- Assistant referees:
  - Lionel Dagorne (France)
  - Vincent Texier (France)
- Fourth official: Jerome Damon (South Africa)
- Fifth official: Enock Molefe (South Africa)
- Man of the match: (Brazil) Ronaldo

=== Knockout stage ===
Round of 16 – Brazil vs Ghana

Tuesday, 27 June 2006
17:00 - FIFA WM-Stadion Dortmund, Dortmund - Attendance: 65,000

Brazil	3 – 0 (2 – 0)	Ghana
Ronaldo 5'
Adriano 46+'
Zé Roberto 84'

Start line-up of the match

BRAZIL:
GK	1	Dida
DF	2	Cafu (C)
DF	3	Lúcio
DF	4	Juan (yellow card) 44'
DF	6	Roberto Carlos
MD	5	Emerson	(- 46')
MD	8	Kaká	(- 83')
MD	11	Zé Roberto
FW	7	Adriano (yellow card) 13'	(- 61')
FW	9	Ronaldo
FW	10	Ronaldinho
Substitutions:
MD	17	Gilberto Silva	(+ 46')
MD	19	Juninho	(+ 61')
MD	20	Ricardinho	(+ 83')
Coach:
Carlos Alberto Parreira

- Referee: Ľuboš Micheľ (Slovakia)
- Assistant referees
  - Roman Slysko (Slovakia)
  - Martin Balko (Slovakia)
- Fourth official: Mark Shield (Australia)
- Fifth official: Nathan Gibson (Australia)
- Man of the match: (Brazil) Zé Roberto

Quarter-final – Brazil vs France

Saturday, 1 July 2006
21:00 - FIFA WM-Stadion Frankfurt, Frankfurt - Attendance: 52,000

Brazil	0 – 1 (0 – 0)	France
		Henry 57'

Start line-up of the match

BRAZIL:
GK	1	Dida
DF	2	Cafu (C) (yellow card) 25'	(-76')
DF	3	Lúcio (yellow card) 47'
DF	4	Juan (yellow card) 45'
DF	6	Roberto Carlos
MD	8	Kaká	(-79')
MD	10	Ronaldinho
MD	11	Zé Roberto
MD	17	Gilberto Silva
MD	19	Juninho	(-63')
FW	9	Ronaldo (C+76') (yellow card) 47+'
Substitutions:
FW	7	Adriano	(+ 63')
DF	13	Cicinho	(+ 76')
FW	23	Robinho	(+ 79')
Coach:
Carlos Alberto Parreira

- Referee: Luis Medina Cantalejo (Spain)
- Assistant referees
  - Victoriano Giráldez Carrasco (Spain)
  - Pedro Medina Hernández (Spain)
- Fourth official: Mark Shield (Australia)
- Fifth official: Ben Wilson (Australia)
- Man of the match: (France) Zinedine Zidane

== Brazilians in other national teams ==
The Brazilian participation in the World Cup was not restricted to the national football team. Many individuals were involved with other national teams, some as players, some as members of their teams' technical staff. Those playing for other national teams had acquired the respective country's citizenship, and according to FIFA's ruling, can never play for the Brazilian team in the future. Those were:

- In Saudi Arabia: Coach Marcos Paquetá and the entire technical staff, hired by Paquetá. Immediately before the last match in the first stage of the World Cup, when disqualification was imminent for Saudi Arabia, Saudi prince Nawaf bin Faisal, who is president of the Saudi Football Confederation, guaranteed that, regardless of the outcome, Paquetá was to remain as Saudi Arabia's head coach.
- In Tunisia: Maranhão-born Francileudo dos Santos was a striker for the Tunisian team. He was regarded as the team's "star".
- In Portugal: Head coach Luiz Felipe Scolari and his assistant coach, Flávio Murtosa; as well as midfielder Deco.
- In Japan: former player and Brazilian football legend Zico was Japan's head coach. Following the team's elimination, Zico left the Japanese team. In addition, Japan also had the Maringá-born fullback Alex Santos.
- In Spain: São Paulo-born midfielder Marcos Senna played for the Spanish team.
- In Costa Rica: Alexandre Guimarães was the country's head coach for the World Cup, as he had been in Costa Rica's previous participation, in 2002. He also played for Costa Rica in 1990. After losing all three matches, Guimarães left the national team, allegedly in the wake of death threats received via anonymous phone calls.
- In the Mexico national football team: Antonio Naelson "Sinha" played the 2006 world cup for Mexico where he scored one goal versus Iran.
